= List of figures in the Hawaiian religion =

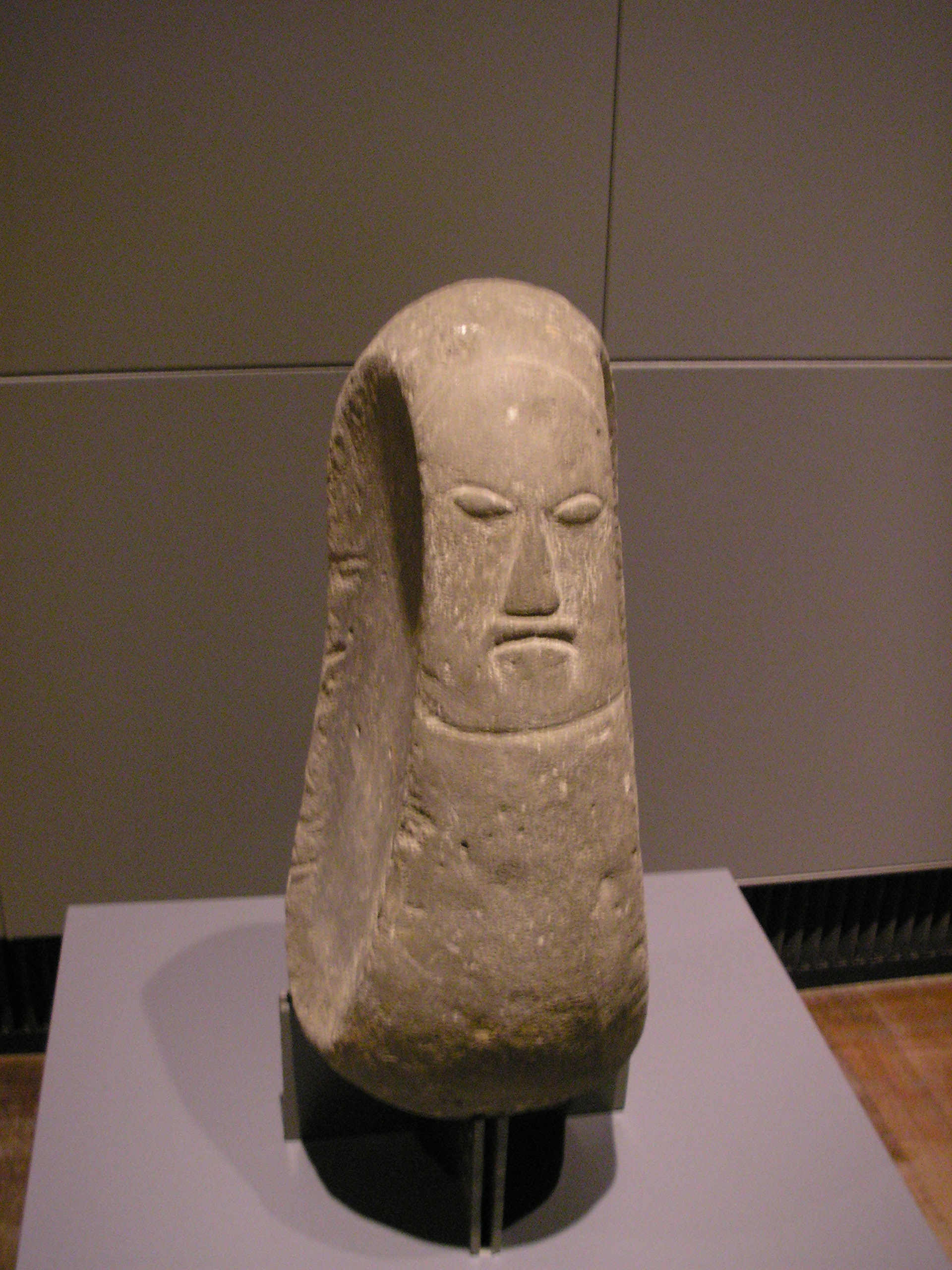
A statue of Hawaiian deity

Hawaiian narrative or mythology, tells stories of nature and life. It is considered a variant of a more general Polynesian narrative, developing its own unique character for several centuries before about 1800. It is associated with the Hawaiian religion. The religion was officially suppressed in the 19th century, but kept alive by some practitioners to the modern day.

== Prominent figures and terms in Hawaiian mythology ==
- ʻAumakua - spirit of an ancestor or family god
- ʻElepaio - monarch flycatcher
- Haumea - goddess of birth
- Hiʻiaka - sister of Pele, daughter of Haumea and Kāne
- Hina - goddess of Moon
- Kahōʻāliʻi - see Kāmohoaliʻi
- Kalanipoo - bird goddess Queen
- Kamapuaʻa - warlike god of wild boars, husband of Pele
- Kāmohoaliʻi - shark god and brother to the major gods, such as Pele
- Kanaloa - God of the ocean, working in concert with Kāne
- Kāne - God of male procreation, fishponds, agriculture, sorcery; created world with help from Lono and Kū
- Kānehekili - Thunder god
- Kāneikokala - shark god of Kahikinui, Maui
- Kapo
- Kapu - the code of conduct of laws and regulations
- Kapua
- Kaulu - killer of Haumea
- Kihawahine - lizard woman
- Kinilau
- Kiʻi – first man, born alongside Laʻilaʻi in the Kumulipo
- Kū - God of war, forests, canoe-building, deep-sea fishing
- Laka - Goddess of hula, the forest, and female reproductivity. Described as both the daughter and sister of Pele
- Lohiʻau - chief of Kauaʻi
- Lono - God of food plants, farming, peace, music, clouds, rainfall, growth, fertility
- Mana - impersonal force
- Māui - ancient hero and chief, demigod, shapeshifter.
- Menehune
- Moʻo
- Nāmaka - sea goddess and sister of Pele.
- Nanaue - demigod, son of Kāmohoaliʻi the shark god, and Kalei, a mortal woman
- Nuʻakea - goddess of milk
- Nightmarchers
- Nuʻu - Hawaiian Noah
- Papa - Goddess of Nature
- Paʻao
- Pakaʻa - God of the wind, Inventor of the sail, Father of Ku-a-paka'a, Son of Kuanuʻuanu & Laʻamaomao
- Papahānaumoku
- Paupueo
- Pele - Goddess of volcanoes, frequently described as an ʻaumakua
- Poliʻahu - goddesses of snow
- Tuna
- Ukupanipo - another shark god
- Wahieloa
- Waka - lizard goddess
- Wākea - Sky father father of islands

== See also ==
- Folklore in Hawaii
- Ghosts in Polynesian culture
- Hawaiian religion
- Māori mythology
- Polynesian mythology
- Samoan mythology
