= The Shark God =

The Shark God may refer to:

- The Shark God, American title of the 2004 book The Last Heathen by Charles Montgomery
- The Shark God (1913 film), directed by John Griffith Wray
- The Shark God, British title of the 1949 American film Omoo-Omoo, the Shark God
- Kāmohoaliʻi, a shark god in Hawaiian religion
- Ukupanipo, a shark god in Hawaiian religion
- Dakuwaqa, a shark god in Fijian mythology
- The Shark God, father of DC Comics' fictional character King Shark

== See also ==
- Shark
- List of water deities
