= Nu'u (disambiguation) =

Nu'u may refer to:

- Nuʻu, in Hawaiian religion, a man who built an ark
- Nuʻu, Samoa, a village on the island of Savaiʻi
- Nu'u, a word for "village" or the place where one is from, in the Samoan language
