= R. Kikuo Johnson =

American illustrator and cartoonist

Reid Kikuo Johnson (born in 1981) is an American illustrator and cartoonist. He is known for illustrating several covers of The New Yorker in addition to the graphic novels Night Fisher, The Shark King, and No One Else. In 2023 he became the first graphic novelist to receive the Whiting Award for fiction.

== Early life ==
Johnson was born and raised on the island of Maui. He studied illustration at the Rhode Island School of Design under cartoonist David Mazzucchelli.

== Career ==
Johnson began working on his first graphic novel, Night Fisher, while studying at the Rhode Island School of Design. Released in 2005, the semi-autobiographical coming of age story set on Maui won the 2006 Harvey Award for Best New Talent as well as the Russ Manning Award at the 2006 Eisner Awards.

Johnson regularly works in commercial illustration. His artwork first appeared in the pages of The New Yorker in 2006 and on the cover of the magazine in 2016. Several of his illustrations and prints were acquired by the Library of Congress.

Johnson's all-ages graphic novel The Shark King was published in 2012 by Toon Books and is based on the Hawaiian legend of Nanaue, son of Kāmohoaliʻi.

No One Else, a graphic novella, was published in 2021 by Fantagraphics. It was called "note-perfect" by the New York Times and was included on multiple Best of 2021 lists from major publications. The book won multiple awards including the 2021 LA Times Book Prize, the Ignatz Award for outstanding graphic novel, the Lucca Comics Award for Best Script, and it was named a 2022 Lynd Ward Prize honor book.

== Teaching ==
Johnson teaches a comics creation class at the Rhode Island School of Design which he began teaching in 2009.

== Works ==
=== Graphic novels ===
- Night Fisher (Fantagraphics books, 2005, ISBN 1683964705)
- The Shark King (Toon Books, 2012, ISBN 1935179160}
- No One Else (Fantagraphics books, 2021, ISBN 1683964799)

=== Selected short comics stories ===
- "Thrustman" (in Project: Superior, 2005 ISBN 0-9721794-8-8)
- "Cher Shimura" (in Mome Vol. 3, 2005 ISBN 1560976977)
- "John James Audubon in Pursuit of the Golden Eagle" (in The Believer, Feb 1, 2006)
- "Conditioning" (in The New York Times, August 3, 2007)
- "Anything But Retail" (in Strange Tales, Marvel Comics, December, 2009)
- "Body and Soul" (in The New Yorker, April 3, 2017)
- "Uncharted Maui" (in The New Yorker, July 26, 2021)
- "Hawaiian Snow" (in The New York Times, Jan 7, 2022)
- "Lahaina Hallelujah" (The New Yorker, November 22, 2023)
- "Birthday Blues" (The New Yorker, April 8, 2024)

== Awards ==
- 2023 Whiting Award for fiction.
- 2022 Ignatz Award Outstanding Graphic Novel for No One Else
- 2022 Lucca Comics Award Gran Giungi Miglior [Best Script] for Nessun Altro [No One Else]
- 2022 American Society of Magazine Editors Best Cover Winner in the "News and Politics" category for The New Yorker cover, "Delayed"
- 2022 Lynd Ward Prize Honor for No One Else
- 2021 LA Times Book Prize Winner Graphic Novel/Comics for No One Else
- 2021 Society of Illustrators gold medal in the Editorial category for The New Yorker cover, "Delayed"
- 2018 Society of Illustrators gold medal in the Editorial category for The New Yorker cover, "Safe Travels"
- 2017 American Society of Magazine Editors Best Cover Winner in the "Brainiest" category for The New Yorker cover, "Commencement"
- 2013 Asian/Pacific American Awards for Literature, for The Shark King
- 2006 Harvey Award, Best New Talent, for Night Fisher
- 2006 Russ Manning Award, for Night Fisher
