= Kāne Milohaʻi =

Minor Hawaiian god

Kāne-milo-hai
- Venerated in: Hawaiian religion
- Gender: Male

Genealogy
- Parents: Haumea (mother)
- Siblings: Kāmohoaliʻi; Pele; Kapo; Nāmaka; Hiʻiaka

In Hawaiian mythology, Kāne-milo-hai is the brother of Kāmohoaliʻi, Pele, Kapo, Nāmaka and Hiʻiaka (among others) by Haumea.

He is a figure most prominently in the story of Pele's journey along the island chain to Hawaiʻi, and may be seen as a terrestrial counterpart to his brother, the shark-god Kāmohoaliʻi.

The word kāne alone means "man", and Kāne is one of the four major Hawaiian deities along with Kanaloa, Kū, and Lono. As a result, Kāne-milo-hai is occasionally confused with the latter.
