= Kanehekili =

Hawaiian thunder god

- God of thunder
- Venerated in: Hawaiian religion
- Gender: Male

Genealogy
- Parents: Haumea (mother)
- Siblings: Pele; Hiʻiaka

In Hawaiian mythology, Kanehekili (also Kane-hekili) is the brother of Pele and Hiʻiaka (among others) by Haumea. He is the god of thunder, which is also his divine form.

He was born from the mouth of Haumea.

During thunderstorms, followers of Kanehekili remain silent. Legend holds that two stones in a cave in Kahuku were once two boys who broke the silence during a storm.

Kanehekili appears to his follower's dreams in human form, with his feet on the ground and his head touching the clouds. In this form, one side of his body is black and the other white. As such, anyone born with a birthmark on the right side of their body is said to be favored by him.

A kahuna named Kahekili was thought to be possessed by Kanehekili, with any attempt against his life being thwarted by a violent thunderstorm.
