= King Shark =

DC Comics supervillain

- Textless cover of Aquaman: Sword of Atlantis #47 (January 2007). Art by Jackson Guice and Daniel Brown.

Publication information
- Publisher: DC Comics
- First appearance: Cameo appearance: Superboy (vol. 4) #0 (October 1994); Full appearance: Superboy (vol. 4) #9 (November 1994)
- Created by: Karl Kesel; Tom Grummett

In-story information
- Alter ego: Nanaue
- Species: Demigod shark
- Place of origin: Hawaii, New Earth
- Team affiliations: Suicide Squad; Secret Society of Super Villains; Secret Six; N.E.M.O. Justice League
- Abilities: Superhuman strength, stamina, durability, speed, and senses; Sharp teeth and claws; Regeneration; Underwater breathing; Aquatic empathy

Altered in-story information for adaptations to other media
- Team affiliations: Creature Commandos

King Shark is a supervillain and sometimes an antihero appearing in American comic books published by DC Comics. The character, also known as Nanaue, was created by writer Karl Kesel and artist Tom Grummett. King Shark's first key appearance was in Superboy (vol. 4) #0 (October 1994) as a cameo before making his first full appearance in Superboy (vol. 4) #9 (November 1994). The character originated as a recurring enemy of Superboy (Conner Kent) and later Aquaman. As the character underwent development by later writers, he was featured more prominently as a member of the Secret Six and Suicide Squad anti-hero teams.

The character has been adapted from the comics into various forms of media, including television series, feature films, and video games. King Shark made his live-action debut in the television series The Flash, voiced by David Hayter while Dan Payne portrayed his human form. Sylvester Stallone and Ron Funches voice King Shark in The Suicide Squad and Harley Quinn respectively. The character also prominently features in the video game Suicide Squad: Kill the Justice League as one of the main playable characters, voiced by wrestler Samoa Joe.

== Fictional character biography ==
Born in Hawaii, Nanaue is a humanoid shark and the son of "The King of All Sharks"—also known as the Shark God. Sam Makoa was responsible for bringing Nanaue in. King Shark is freed by the Silicon Dragons, who plan on hiring him, but kills them instead. When Superboy and Makoa are assigned to the Suicide Squad to destroy the remaining Dragons, Nanaue is forced to help them. He is outfitted with an explosive belt, which will explode if anything happens to Makoa.

King Shark reappears one year after the events of Infinite Crisis, bearing a scar from a previous encounter with Aquaman. He serves as an unwilling caretaker for Arthur Joseph Curry. Saved from a gang of marauders by the young man, he brings Curry to the Dweller in the Depths (a mutated Aquaman), who gave him the role of assisting the new Aquaman in filling his role. Albeit feigning disrespect, and often disappearing for a while, King Shark accepted, sharing his knowledge of the way of sea with his young savior. It is later revealed in a flashback sequence that he was asked to do so by his father.

The following arc tells the first meeting between the original Aquaman and King Shark, which occurred several years ago. It took place in Reef's End, a town in the Coral Sea far from Atlantis. Orin — who was still the King of Atlantis at this time — fought King Shark because he murdered a priest of the Order of the Thorny Crown. King Shark had previously killed a number of members of this group, obeying his father's will. However, King Shark was defeated by Aquaman before he could completely destroy the Order.

King Shark later joins the Secret Six as a brawler. His tenure with the Six proves to be short-lived, as the team is captured during a failed mission in Gotham City. King Shark manages to briefly overpower his old foe Superboy during the battle, but is beaten by Supergirl.

=== The New 52 ===
King Shark's hammerhead shark appearance on the cover of Aquaman (vol. 8) #32 (March 2018). Art by Stjepan Šejić.

In September 2011, DC Comics rebooted its fictional continuity in an initiative called "The New 52". In this new timeline, King Shark now resembles a hammerhead shark. He was tortured and forced into the Suicide Squad by Amanda Waller. During the 2013 "Forever Evil" storyline, King Shark is among the villains who the Crime Syndicate recruits to join the Secret Society of Super Villains.

In 2016, DC Comics implemented a relaunch of its books called DC Rebirth, aimed at undoing the changes brought by The New 52. As part of this relaunch, King Shark was restored to his original great white shark appearance. King Shark began serving N.E.M.O. under Black Manta. He began terrorizing San Francisco before being subdued by the Teen Titans. He also appears as one of the many villains attempting to kill Batman to halt Two-Face's data breach. After leaving the organization, King Shark attempted to live a more peaceful life, only to be captured by the military of Markovia under allegations of cannibalizing a Markovian general. Wonder Woman soon arrives, doubting that he committed the crime, and uses the Lasso of Truth on him to prove his innocence. Wonder Woman leaves King Shark in the hands of Aquaman, hoping to start anew in Atlantis.

Following Aquaman's usurpation of the throne, King Shark returns as a crime lord of the Ninth Tride with plans to expand his empire to more regions of Atlantis. He has his minions capture Mera to use as a bargaining chip and has a run-in with the still alive Aquaman. He convinces King Shark to work with him at stopping King Rath's murderous ambitions on the condition that the Ninth Tride would receive better treatment by the new monarch. As a show of good faith, King Shark gives Mera back to Arthur. With their combined forces, they free Atlantis from the Crown of Thorns.

King Shark appears in the storyline DC K.O., where he takes part in the eponymous tournament to combat Darkseid. Following the tournament, King Shark and the other participants receive visions of the future, with his vision leading him to swear loyalty to Aquaman. In addition, King Shark joins the Justice League as part of an amnesty deal given to him and other supervillains.

== Powers and abilities ==
Nanaue's augmented flesh provides protection against underwater pressures and physical attacks. His shark-like physiology includes natural weapons, as well as gills that allows him to breathe underwater. He can swim at great speeds, regrow lost bodily tissues, or withstand cold temperatures. Nanaue has enhanced strength, stamina, and senses. King Shark was able to sense or call out his shark "cousins" for assistance, although he cannot actually control them, especially when they are filled with blood frenzy. His mystical nature means that his bite could even pierce the skin of Kryptonians.

== Other versions ==
An alternate reality version of King Shark appears in the Flashpoint tie-in Deadman and the Flying Graysons. This version works as a strongman at Haley's Circus before he is killed during an Amazon attack.

== In other media ==
=== Television ===
King Shark as depicted in The Flash.

- An original incarnation of King Shark named Shay Lamden appears in The Flash, voiced by David Hayter as King Shark and portrayed by Dan Payne as Shay Lamden respectively. This version is a marine biologist from Earth-2 who transformed into a humanoid shark following the explosion of Harry Wells' particle accelerator and fell under Zoom's control. Additionally, his Earth-1 counterpart is stated to have died following his version of the accelerator explosion.
- King Shark appears in Harley Quinn, voiced by Ron Funches. This version is a kind and peaceful tech genius who wears clothes and is shown to have a generally positive attitude. However, he occasionally goes berserk if he smells blood and is angered by fish-related insults. In the fourth season, Poison Ivy recruits him into the Legion of Doom as the head of their IT department.
- King Shark appears in Young Justice, voiced by James Arnold Taylor. This version, also known as King Nanaue Sha'ark, is the ruler of the Atlantean city-state of Nanauve and a former student of the Atlantean Conservatory of Sorcery.
- King Shark appears in Teen Titans Go!, voiced by Eric Edelstein.
- King Shark appears in Suicide Squad Isekai, voiced by Subaru Kimura in the Japanese version and Andrew Love in the English dub.

=== Film ===
- King Shark makes a minor non-speaking appearance in Superman/Batman: Public Enemies.
- King Shark appears in Batman: Assault on Arkham, voiced by John DiMaggio. This version is a mutant human who wields a metal mask that augments his biting capability and sports a red mohawk. He is recruited by Amanda Waller to become a member of the Suicide Squad, who are tasked with killing the Riddler. During the mission, King Shark befriends Killer Frost and is killed by a bomb Waller implanted into the squad members' necks to control them. The bomb went off despite King Shark undergoing electroshock therapy due to his tough skin insulating the bomb.
- King Shark appears in Justice League Dark: Apokolips War, voiced again by John DiMaggio. This version is a member of the Suicide Squad and John Constantine's ex-boyfriend. He and his team assist the Justice League in an attempt to defeat Darkseid before being killed by Paradooms.

=== DC Extended Universe and DC Universe ===
King Shark as depicted in The Suicide Squad.

Nanaue / King Shark appears in media set in the DC Extended Universe (DCEU) and DC Universe (DCU). This version displays a childlike demeanor, speaks in simple sentences, and is an inmate of Belle Reve Penitentiary.

- Nanaue first appears in the DCEU film The Suicide Squad, voiced by Sylvester Stallone and motion captured by Steve Agee. He is recruited into the titular team to infiltrate the Corto Maltesean research facility Jötunheim and destroy "Project Starfish", during which he befriends teammate Ratcatcher 2.
- Nanaue appears in the Creature Commandos episode "A Very Funny Monster", voiced by Diedrich Bader. By this time, he is transferred to the eponymous team.

=== Video games ===
- King Shark appears as a character summon in Scribblenauts Unmasked: A DC Comics Adventure.
- King Shark appears as a playable DLC character in Lego Batman 3: Beyond Gotham, voiced by Travis Willingham. This version sports his hammerhead shark appearance from The New 52.
- King Shark appears as an unlockable playable character in Lego DC Super-Villains, voiced by Fred Tatasciore.
- King Shark appears in DC Universe Online, voiced by Dale Dudley.
- King Shark appears as a playable character in Suicide Squad: Kill the Justice League, voiced by Samoa Joe.

=== Miscellaneous ===
- King Shark's son Kid Shark appears in the Batman: Arkham Knight prequel comic.
- The Young Justice incarnation of King Shark appears in the series' self-titled tie-in comic book.
- The Flash's Earth-1 incarnation of Shay Lamden / King Shark appears in The Flash: Season Zero. He accepts Dr. Shults' offer to undergo an experimental procedure employing shark cells to regenerate his dying body, but is exposed to dark matter during the explosion of S.T.A.R. Labs' particle accelerator, which transforms him into a humanoid shark. Developing a vendetta against those involved in the procedure, Lamden comes into conflict with the Flash and the Suicide Squad.
- King Shark appears in DC Super Hero Girls, voiced by Kevin Michael Richardson.
