= Pele's Curse =

Hawaiian tourist myth

Pele's Curse is the belief that anything natively Hawaiian, such as sand, rock, or pumice, will bring bad luck on whoever takes it away from Hawaii. One version about the legend's genesis is this: a disgruntled park ranger, angry at the number of rocks that were being taken from the islands by visitors, said that Pele would curse them with bad luck should they take anything. Another version often told is that bus drivers, tired of the dirt and grime brought on their buses by the tourists' collection of rocks, started the story at the beginning of each tour to discourage the rock collecting.

The myth has caught on, told as if it were an original Hawaiian taboo, and every year countless tourists send items back to Hawaii in order to escape the awful luck that Pele has caused them.

So, although the legend itself is probably of twentieth-century origin, the removal of rocks as souvenirs is now frowned upon by Hawaiians. Also, it is illegal to remove minerals from within a U.S. national park.
