= Kāmohoaliʻi =

Hawaiian shark god

Kamohoaliʻi
- God of sharks and steam
- Other names: Ka-moho-ali’i; Moho
- Abode: Underwater caves; waters around Maui and Kahoʻolawe

Genealogy
- Parents: Papahānaumoku or Haumea (mother); Wakea or Ku-waha-ilo (father)
- Siblings: Kāne Milohaʻi; Pele; Kapo; Nāmaka; Hiʻiaka
- Consort: Kalei
- Children: Nanaue

In Hawaiian religion, Kamohoaliʻi (also Ka-moho-ali’i or Moho) is a shark and steam god and a brother of Kāne Milohaʻi, Pele, Kapo, Nāmaka, and Hiʻiaka. He also fathered Nanaue with Kalei.

Depending on the version of the myth, he was born to either Papahānaumoku and Wakea or to Haumea and Ku-waha-ilo. In both tellings, he is born from his mother's head.

Kamohoaliʻi swam in the area around the islands of Maui and Kahoʻolawe. When a ship was lost at sea, Ka-moho-aliʻi shook his tail in front of the fleet and the kahuna would feed him awa, a narcotic drink, and Kamohoaliʻi would guide the men home. He is sometimes said to have guided the ships of the original inhabitants of Hawaiʻi from the mainland to their island home in this way.

Kamohoaliʻi had the power to take on the form of any fish and is believed to own multiple underwater caves beneath the ocean where he dwells.

He is said to have adopted the little red-haired shark that killed the fierce king shark of Maui.

Kamohoaliʻi is considered among the principal ancestral sharks (manō kumupaʻa), with Kūhaimoana, Kānehunamoku, Kauhuhu, and Kāneikokala.

== See also ==
- Ukupanipo, also a Hawaiian shark god
