= Kaulu =

Trickster god in Hawaiian religion

- Trickster god
- Venerated in: Hawaiian religion
- Gender: Male

Genealogy
- Parents: Kukaohialaka (father); Hinauluohia (mother)
- Siblings: Kaeha; Kamano
- Consort: Lanikai

In Hawaiian religion, Kaulu is a trickster god who killed goddess Haumea at Niuhelewai, by catching her in a net obtained from Makaliʻi. He then killed Lonokaeho, also called Piokeanuenue, king of Koʻolau, by singing an incantation. Kaulu is known for being extremely powerful and strong, both physically and with magic, and he had many adventures in Hawaiian mythology. He is known for his control over the forces of nature and the weather patterns on the islands.

== Family ==
His parents were Kukaohialaka and Hinauluohia, and he was born on the island of Oʻahu. Kaulu was the youngest of three siblings. His older brothers were named Kaeha and Kamano. When Kaulu was still a baby in his mother's womb, his older brother Kamano threatened to kill him, but then Kaulu's other brother, Kaeha, said he would protect Kaulu. Because of the danger of Kamano, Kaulu waited for five years in his mother's womb, and he shapeshifted into a piece of rope to be born.

Kaulu was then born as a piece of rope, and so, Kamano did not kill him, and Kaeha put the rope on a shelf and protected it until Kaulu turned back into humanoid form. Although it is unclear just what exactly Kaulu's parents were, as they might have been either humans or gods or perhaps a sort of humanoid race of earthly gods, Kaulu himself is definitely a deity and is often thought of as a trickster god. Kaulu grew up very strong and powerful, and he protected Kaeha, saving him from many attacks by other gods and monsters. Kaulu's wife was called Lanikai, and she never bore any children.

== Abilities ==
Kaulu has many strange abilities and is an extremely powerful fighter. He is a trickster god, can be quite destructive and even violent, and is known as one of the most powerful beings in Hawaiian religion. Kaulu was powerful enough to kill several other Hawaiian deities. Kaulu is immortal and does not age. Kaulu also seems invulnerable to harm while fighting. In one of the legends of Kaulu, he fought other gods, killed them, and killed a huge shark monster. At birth, he was already able to shapeshift and speak.

Kaulu's brother, Kaeha, also displayed the shapeshifting ability when he shrank to a tiny size and hid in a leaf while speaking to people as a prank, making them sacrifice their alcoholic beverage to him. Kaulu also has the ability to communicate with spirits, and when he was a kid, he used them to find his brother, Kaeha. It would seem that Kaulu actually has some kind of reality-warping ability as well. When Kaulu was just a child, he challenged the ocean and its huge, many-story-high waves to a fight, and the waves crashed against him, but he didn't even budge.

Kaulu then struck the ocean, and ever since then, the waves around Hawaii have been much smaller. In another legend, Kaulu's brother, Kaeha, was tricked by some of the gods into going out on a surfboard and was then eaten by the chief of sharks. So Kaulu drained the entire ocean by drinking it, which is why the ocean is salty. Kaulu then tore the jaws of the shark apart with his bare hands and freed and saved his brother Kaeha. The story mentions Kaulu being attacked by another supernatural figure with a lightning bolt, and Kaulu blocked it with one finger.

In the legends of Kaulu, he could pull pranks on the spirits and gods and was so good at shapeshifting that even the spirits could not find him when he hid from them. The Hawaiian seer or sage Makaliʻi stated that Kaulu is "all-powerful". In another part of the legend, Kaulu flies or travels to the realm of the gods in heaven and asks them for food. The guards jokingly agree to let him have as much as he can carry, and Kaulu takes all of the food and storage of their entire farm in his arms.

== Stories of Kaulu ==
In a story of Kaulu as a child, he challenged the ocean and its waves to a fight. Kaulu mocked and taunted the spirits that control the waves and swells. Kaulu asked them how strong they were, and when they said they were very strong, Kaulu fought them. When Kaulu struck the surf, the waves weakened, which is why they are smaller today. In another feat of reality-bending, Kaulu then faced off against a huge dog monster and tore it to bloody pieces, which is why dogs are smaller now as well.

Kaulu then found his older brother, Kaeha, who lived in a village with a group called The Akua, possibly spirits. They all liked to drink an alcoholic beverage called ʻawa. Kaulu and his brother Kaeha performed pranks on the Akua before they all drank ʻawa. Kaulu told his brother Kaeha, "Yes, tell the Akua to drink their ʻawa first, and you will take yours after them. But before you drink yours, offer a little to me as your god by saying: 'Here is our ʻawa." Kaeha then did so, and after sacrificing to Kaulu, Kaulu answered from the darkness, hiding in a leaf.

The Akua then thought Kaeha was making a sacrifice to a powerful god, which even puzzled Kane and Kanaloa, who sent Kolea to ask the sage Makaliʻi about it. Makaliʻi said, "Kaulu, the youngest brother of Kaeha, is all-powerful and strong, and he's hiding in the palm leaves." The Akua then searched for Kaulu in the palm leaves but could not find him. One story says he put stones in the resting places of "The akua" so they would hit their heads on them when they woke up, and then tried to attack Kaeha and Kaulu, and refused to share food with them. Kaulu is often described as a small and young-looking boy in these stories.

Multiple Hawaiian legends tell of a great famine that once struck Hawaii. Some versions of the story cite Haumea as the cause, and show Kaulu as the hero who saves the people by tricking the gods and sages in heaven into letting him take all their food. Kaulu then obtains a magical net from the divine sage Makaliʻi and uses it to trap and murder Haumea.

Another part of the Kaulu story says he killed the "shark of the gods", which was a huge chief shark that some of the Hawaiian gods used to send out to kill things with. Kaulu killed Kukama-ulu-nui-akea, who apparently he then threw up into the milky way, out into the galaxy.

"The king shark of Kane and Kanaloa in Lewa-lani, called Ku-kama-ulu-nui-akea or Kalakeʻe-nui-a-Kane, whom Kaulu slays in this legend and whose spirit flies up to the Milky Way, has its prototype in the South Seas. In the Tuamotus the Milky Way is the sacred ocean of Kiho-tumu; the dark rift in the Milky Way is his sacred ship, called The-long-shark."
