= Kaʻōhelo =

Hawaiian goddess

- Venerated in: Hawaiian religion
- Gender: Female

Genealogy
- Siblings: Pele
- Consort: Heʻeia

In Hawaiian mythology, Kaʻōhelo is a mortal sister of Pele, the goddess of volcanos, and the wife of Heʻeia. Upon her death, she was transformed into the sacred ʻOhelo shrub.
