= Nuʻu, Samoa =

Village of Samoa

Coordinates: 13.7667°S 172.4333°W

Nuʻu is a village on the island of Savaiʻi in Samoa. It is situated on the south coast of the island in Palauli district.

The word nuʻu in the Samoan language means village or the place a person belongs to.
