= Hiʻiaka (moon) =

Larger moon of Haumea

- In this photo taken by the Hubble Space Telescope, Hiʻiaka is the brighter spot near the top, directly on top Haumea (center).

Discovery
- Discovered by: Michael E. Brown; Keck Observatory adaptive optics team
- Discovery site: W. M. Keck Obs., Mauna Kea
- Discovery date: 26 January 2005

Designations
- Designation: (136108) Haumea I
- Pronunciation: /hiːʔiˈɑːkə/ Hawaiian: [ˈhiʔiˈjɐkə]
- Named after: Hiʻiaka
- Alternative names: S/2005 (2003 EL_{61}) 1 S/2005 (136108) 1

Orbital characteristics (Note: The orbital elements listed in the infobox are time-averaged non-Keplerian orbital elements, which are derived from 2006–2015 Hubble Space Telescope (HST) observations. These are listed as "HST-only fit" elements in Proudfoot et al. (2024), who found that the HST-only fit has the lowest systematic observational errors compared to the orbital elements derived from combined HST and Keck telescope observations.)
- Epoch 28 May 2008 12:00 UT (JD 2454615.0)
- Semi-major axis: 49371±45 km
- Eccentricity: 0.0542±0.0012
- Orbital period (sidereal): 49.462±0.083 d
- Mean anomaly: 154.53°+2.05° −2.00°
- Inclination: 77.394°±0.038° (to ecliptic); 1.01°+0.66° −0.47° (to Haumea's equator); 13.2°±0.2° (to Namaka's orbital plane)
- Longitude of ascending node: 13.110°+0.030° −0.031° (to ecliptic)
- Argument of periapsis: 98.34°+2.02° −2.06°
- Satellite of: Haumea

Physical characteristics
- Dimensions: 480 × 360 × 286 km; ± (80 × 60 × 14 km)
- Mean diameter: 370±20 km (volume equivalent)
- Mass: (1.6±0.2)×10^{19} kg (2025) (1.2±0.3)×10^{19} kg (2024)
- Mean density: 0.640±0.080 g/cm^{3} (Note: Density of 0.640±0.080 g/cm^{3} calculated using a volume-equivalent diameter of 370±20 km and mass of (1.6±0.2)×10^{19} kg.)
- Synodic rotation period: 9.68±0.02 h
- Axial tilt: ≈ 0° wrt Haumea
- Albedo: 0.74±0.15 (Note: The abstract of the Fernández-Valenzuela et al. (2025) paper says Hiʻiaka has a geometric albedo of 0.76±0.15, but the rest of the paper says 0.74±0.15. The 0.76 value is a typo according to the peer review document.)
- Temperature: ≈ 40 K (same as Haumea)
- Apparent magnitude: ~ 20 (Note: The average brightness difference between Hiʻiaka and Haumea in visible light is 2.81±0.08 magnitudes. Observations in the Minor Planet Center's database give a visible light apparent magnitude of around 17 for Haumea; adding Hiʻiaka's magnitude difference to Haumea's apparent magnitude gives an apparent magnitude of 19.8, rounded up to 20.)
- Absolute magnitude (H): 3.21±0.12 (average)

Hiʻiaka, formal designation (136108) Haumea I, is the larger, outer moon of the trans-Neptunian dwarf planet Haumea. Discovered by Michael E. Brown and the Keck Observatory adaptive optics team on 26 January 2005, it is named after Hiʻiaka, the patron goddess of the Big Island of Hawaii and one of the daughters of Haumea. The moon follows a slightly elliptical orbit around Haumea every 49.5 days, at a distance of 49,400 km (30,700 mi).

Hiʻiaka is an elongated and irregularly shaped body with a mean diameter of 370 km (230 mi), making it the sixth-largest known moon of a trans-Neptunian object. It has a very low bulk density of 0.64 g/cm^{3}, which indicates it is mostly made of loosely-packed water ice and rock. Telescope observations have shown that Hiʻiaka has a highly reflective surface made of crystalline water ice, much like Haumea itself. Hiʻiaka rotates about its axis every 9.68 hours. Like its smaller sibling moon Namaka, Hiʻiaka is believed to be a fragment of Haumea that was ejected in the aftermath of a giant impact 4.4 billion years ago.

== Discovery ==
Hiʻiaka was the first satellite discovered around Haumea. It was discovered on 26 January 2005 by Michael E. Brown and the W. M. Keck Observatory adaptive optics team at Mauna Kea, Hawaii. The discovery of Haumea had not been made public at the time, so the discovery of Hiʻiaka was announced later on 29 July 2005. When Hiʻiaka was announced, it given the temporary provisional designation S/2005 (2003 EL_{61}) 1, which indicates it is the first moon of Haumea (then known as 2003 EL_{61}) discovered in 2005. At the time, Brown had been nicknaming Haumea "Santa," so he nicknamed Hiʻiaka "Rudolph," after one of Santa Claus's reindeer.

Haumea, Hiʻiaka, and Namaka were all officially named after Hawaiian deities by the International Astronomical Union (IAU) on 17 September 2008. In Hawaiian mythology, Hiʻiaka is the patron goddess of hula and is the daughter of the fertility goddess Haumea. These names were proposed to the IAU by Brown's team in September 2006, who wanted to pay tribute to the location where they discovered the moons of Haumea.

== Physical characteristics ==
=== Size, mass, and density ===
Stellar occultations by Hiʻiaka on 6 and 16 April 2021 reveal that the moon is an elongated object resembling an ellipsoid with dimensions of 480 km × 360 km × 286 km (298 mi × 224 mi × 178 mi). These correspond to a volume-equivalent diameter of 370 km (230 mi). Hiʻiaka is the sixth-largest known moon of a trans-Neptunian object, after Charon (1212 km), Dysnomia (615 km), Vanth (443 km), Ilmarë (403 km), and Actaea (393 km). (Note: see List of Solar System objects by size for a better comparison.) Despite its relatively large size, Hiʻiaka is not in hydrostatic equilibrium because its elongated shape is inconsistent with that expected for its current rotation period. Hiʻiaka's lack of hydrostatic equilibrium is most likely due to high material strength.

Hubble Space Telescope measurements of gravitational perturbations in Hiʻiaka's orbital path show that the moon has a mass of 1.213+0.322
−0.311×10^{19} kg. A simplified assumption of Haumea's oblateness suggests that Hiʻiaka has a mass of (1.6±0.2)×10^{19} kg. The latter mass estimate points to a very low density of 0.64 g/cm^{3}, which indicates Hiʻiaka has a highly porous and icy interior. Hiʻiaka is too small for its interior to undergo differentiation, so it lacks a substantial core. Hiʻiaka's highly porous interior supports the hypothesis that the moon accumulated from icy fragments flung off by Haumea's rapid rotation.

=== Rotation ===
Hiʻiaka rotates about its axis in 9.68 hours. The moon's rotation is not tidally locked to Haumea because it likely formed far from Haumea, where the dwarf planet's tidal forces are weak enough to have little effect on rotation. Hiʻiaka's rotation period was first measured in a 2016 study using 2009–2010 observations from the Magellan and Hubble Space Telescope, which showed that Hiʻiaka's brightness periodically varies by 19% (0.23 magnitudes) as it rotates. Plotting Hiʻiaka's light curve (brightness over time) shows a sawtooth waveform, which indicates irregularites and angular features in the moon's shape. Observations found no change in Hiʻiaka's rotational brightness variations over 15 years, indicating that the moon's rotation is aligned with Haumea's rotation—having an axial tilt or obliquity close to 0° with respect to Haumea. The orientation of Hiʻiaka's shape seen in stellar occultations adds further evidence to Hiʻiaka's low obliquity.

Simulations show that gravitational perturbations by Haumea should cause Hiʻiaka's spin axis to precess on a timescale of decades. The axial precession rate of Hiʻiaka depends on its obliquity with respect to its orbit around Haumea; if Hiʻiaka has a larger obliquity, then its precession period would be longer. The axial precession of Hiʻiaka may be determined by monitoring the gradual change in its light curve amplitude over several years.

=== Surface and composition ===
Like Haumea, the surface of Hiʻiaka is dominated by water ice in composition. Hiʻiaka's similar composition to Haumea is a major piece of evidence to the theory that it originated from material ejected from Haumea. The abundance of water ice on Hiʻiaka's surface causes deep absorption features in Hiʻiaka's near-infrared spectrum, particularly at wavelengths of 1.5 μm and 2.0 μm. An additional absorption feature at 1.65 μm indicates that the water ice on Hiʻiaka's surface is primarily in crystalline form. It is unclear why Hiʻiaka's crystalline water ice has not completely turned into amorphous form as would be expected for constant irradiation by cosmic rays; a resurfacing mechanism besides impact cratering remains yet to be seen. Cryovolcanism is unlikely to occur on Hiʻiaka due to its small size and lack of tidal heating.

Hiʻiaka has a very high geometric albedo of 0.74, as measured by optical and occultation observations. Hiʻiaka's albedo is even higher than Haumea's (0.51), which is unusual considering that the moon is made of the same material as Haumea. Near-infrared spectroscopy has shown that Hiʻiaka exhibits deeper water ice absorption features than Haumea, indicating that the water ice on Hiʻiaka's surface is either fresher or purer than that of Haumea, or is made of particle sizes larger than those on Haumea's surface. The latter possibility could explain Hiʻiaka's higher albedo if its surface contains water ice grains between 50 and 100 μm in size, similar to those seen in Saturn's bright icy moons Enceladus and Tethys.

== Origin ==
A chart showing confirmed Haumea family members to scale (as of 2025). Unmeasured members are shown with estimated diameters using an assumed albedo of 0.7.

Namaka and Hiʻiaka are widely believed to be fragments of Haumea that were ejected in the aftermath of a giant impact 4.4 billion years ago (77–82 million years after the formation of the Solar System), when Neptune was migrating outward and gravitationally scattering objects in the Kuiper belt. This impact event is hypothesized to involve two large Kuiper belt objects of similar size, which obliquely collided with each other and merged into a single, rapidly rotating body that eventually deformed into an ellipsoidal body, becoming Haumea today. While this hypothesis explains Haumea's rapid rotation and high bulk density, it fails to explain the existence of Haumea's moons and family of icy KBOs on similar orbits, because such an energetic impact would have ejected fragments at speeds several times Haumea's escape velocity.

Rather than having formed directly from a giant impact, Haumea's family and moons are instead believed to have been ejected via rotational fissioning of Haumea roughly 80 million years after the impact (147–162 million years after the Solar System's formation). A 2022 study led by Jessica Noviello and collaborators proposed that Haumea continued differentiating and growing its rocky core after the giant impact, which led to a gradual speed-up of Haumea's rotation rate as a consequence of angular momentum conservation. Centrifugal forces on Haumea's equator eventually grew so great that icy surface material began ejecting into orbit around Haumea, forming a disk of material that eventually coalesced into moons. About 3% of Haumea's initial mass and 14% of its initial angular momentum were lost via rotational fissioning.

== See also ==
- Namaka – the smaller moon of Haumea
- Haumea family – a population of water-ice rich Kuiper belt objects that were ejected from Haumea 4.4 billion years ago
  - 2002 TX300 – one of the largest Haumea family KBOs, with a diameter similar to Hiʻiaka
