= Nāmaka =

Sea goddess in Hawaiian mythology

- Sea goddess
- Other names: Nā-maka-o-Kahaʻi
- Venerated in: Hawaiian religion
- Abode: Sea
- Gender: Female

Genealogy
- Parents: Ku-waha-ilo (father); Haumea (mother)
- Siblings: Pele; Hiʻiaka sisters; Kama brothers; Halulu
- Consort: ʻAukelenuiaʻīkū

In Hawaiian mythology, Nāmaka (or Nā-maka-o-Kahaʻi, the eyes of Kahaʻi) appears as a sea goddess in the Pele family. She is an older sister of Pele-honua-mea. (Note: Another version states that Pele was born from the head of Haumea, while Nāmaka was born from her thighs, Beckwith (1982:171).)

She is the daughter of Ku-waha-ilo and Haumea, whose other children are Pele, the Hiʻiaka sisters, the Kama brothers, and the bird Halulu. Nāmaka took ʻAukelenuiaʻīkū as her husband, who had arrived in Lalakeenuiakane or in Kahiki (Tahiti), but he later became the husband of her sister Pele, and because of this Pele, the Hiʻiaka sisters, Malulani, and Kaʻōhelo migrate to Hawaii. When Pele quarrels with her powerful sister Nāmaka, Nāmaka sends tidal waves to destroy Pele's lands and homes. Helped by her family, Pele fights Nāmaka, but Nāmaka defeats her.

In Thrum's Kane-huna-moku myth, Nāmaka is called the chiefess of the Mu and Menehune people when they are summoned to build the watercourse for Kikiaola at Waimea on Kauaʻi.

When Pele causes a conflagration by staying too close to the fire god Lono-makua, Nāmaka drives her away. Another legend mentions that Nāmaka's guardian dog, Moela is reduced to ashes when he touches ʻAukele.

== Legacy ==
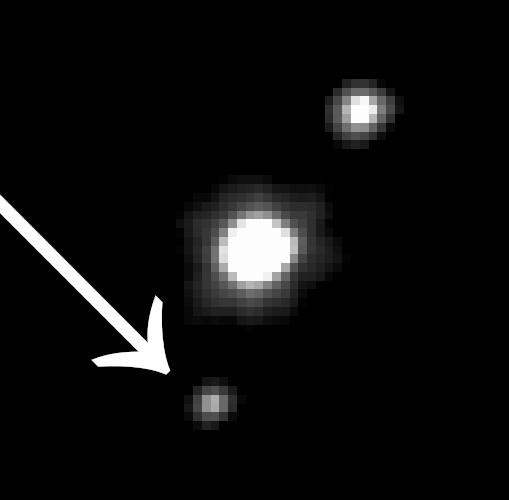
A photo of Haumea and her two moons, with the arrow pointing towards Namaka

Namaka is the name of the smaller and inner moon of the dwarf planet Haumea, and its other moon is named after Namaka's sister, Hiʻiaka.
