= Pele (deity) =

Hawaiian goddess of volcanoes and fire

- Goddess of Volcanoes and Fire
- The Goddess Pele by Arthur Johnsen (2003)
- Abode: Halemaʻumaʻu
- Symbol: fire, volcano

Genealogy
- Parents: Haumea; Ku-waha-ilo
- Siblings: Hiʻiaka; Nāmaka; Kapo; Kamohoalii; Kāne Milohai

In Hawaiian religion, Pele (pronounced [ˈpɛlɛ]) is the goddess of volcanoes and fire and the creator of the Hawaiian Islands. Often referred to as "Madame Pele" or "Tūtū Pele" as a sign of respect, she is a well-known deity within Hawaiian mythology and is notable for her contemporary presence and cultural influence as an enduring figure from ancient Hawaii. Epithets of the goddess include Pele-honua-mea ('Pele of the sacred land') and Ka wahine ʻai honua ('The earth-eating woman').

In different stories talking about the goddess Pele, she was born from the female spirit named Haumea, a descendant of Papa, or Earth Mother, and Wākea, Sky Father, both descendants of the supreme beings. Pele is also known as "She who shapes the sacred land," known to be said in ancient Hawaiian chants. The first published stories about Pele were written down by William Ellis.

== Legends ==
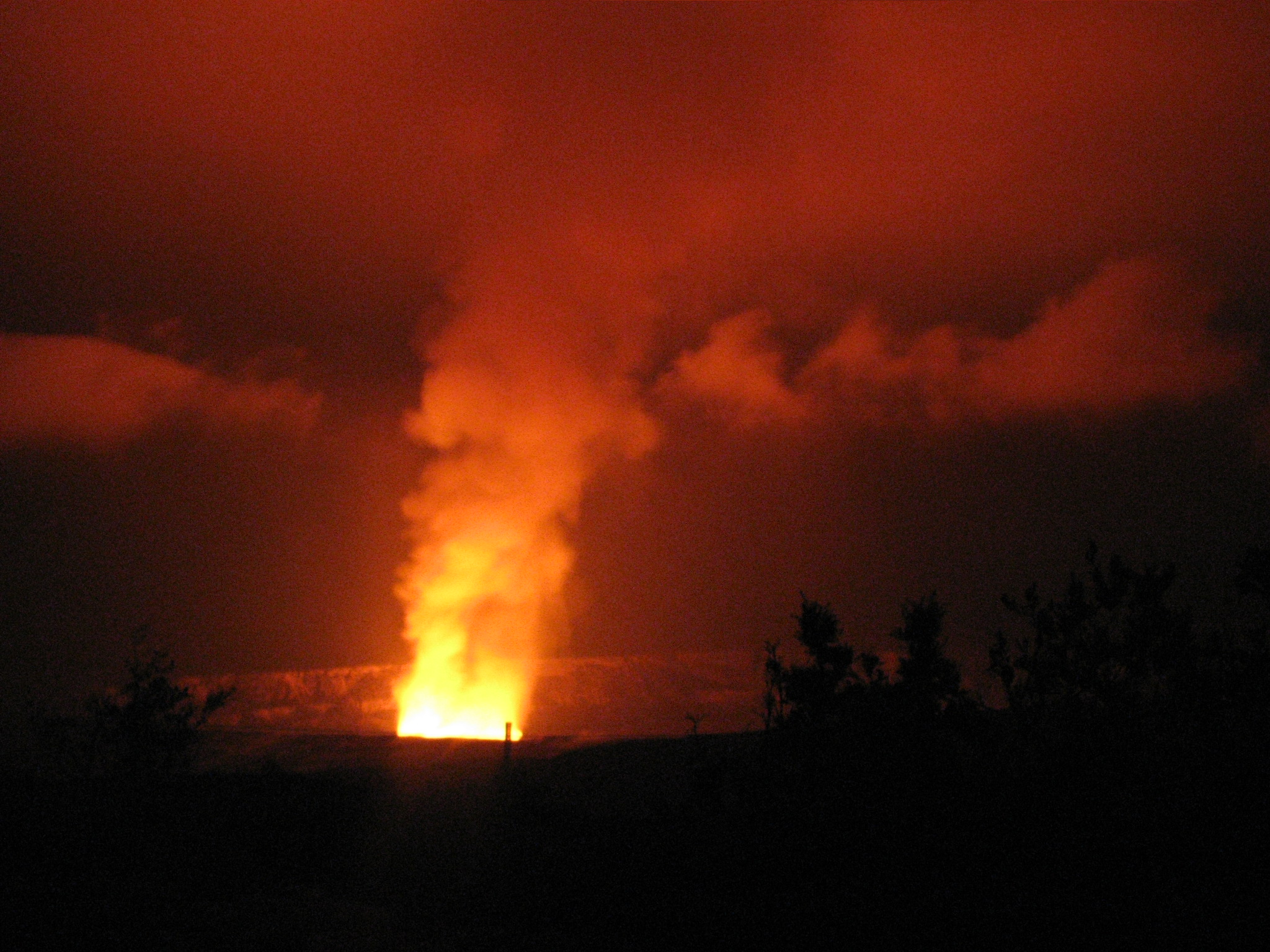
According to legend, Pele lives in Halemaʻumaʻu of Kīlauea in Hawaiʻi Volcanoes National Park.

Kīlauea is an active volcano the island of Hawaiʻi and is extensively studied. Many Hawaiians believe Kīlauea to be inhabited by a "family of fire gods", one of the sisters being Pele, who is believed to govern Kīlauea and control its lava flows.

Several legends are associated with Pele in Hawaiian mythology. In addition to being the goddess of volcanoes, Pele is known for her power, passion, jealousy, and capriciousness. She has numerous siblings, including Kāne Milohai, Kāmohoaliʻi, Nāmaka, and numerous sisters named Hiʻiaka, the most famous being Hiʻiakaikapoliopele (Hiʻiaka in the bosom of Pele). They are usually considered the offspring of Haumea. Pele's siblings include deities of various types of wind, rain, fire, ocean wave forms, and cloud forms. Her home is believed to be the fire pit called Halemaʻumaʻu at the summit caldera of Kīlauea, one of the Earth's most active volcanoes, but her domain encompasses all volcanic activity on the Big Island.

Pele shares features with other malignant deities inhabiting volcanoes, such as the devil Guayota of Guanche Mythology in the Canary Islands, living on the volcano Teide and considered by the aboriginal Guanches to be responsible for its eruptions.

Legend says that Pele journeyed from Tahiti to Hawaiʻi by canoe. It is said she tried to create her fires on different islands along the way, but her sister, Nāmaka, was chasing her, wanting to put an end to her. In the end, the two sisters fought, and Pele was killed. Though her body was destroyed, her spirit lives in Halemaʻumaʻu on Kīlauea. They say: "Her body is the lava and steam that comes from the volcano. She can also change form, appearing as a white dog, old woman, or beautiful young woman."

In addition to her role as goddess of fire and strong association with volcanoes, Pele is the "goddess of the hula." She is a significant figure in the history of hula because of her sister Hiʻiaka, who is believed to be the first person to dance hula. As a result of Pele's significance in hula, many dances and chants have been dedicated to her and her family. Hula is often performed in a way that represents Pele's intense personality and the movement of volcanoes.

=== Expulsion version ===
In one version of the story, Pele is the daughter of Kanehoalani and Haumea in the mystical land of Kuaihelani, a floating free land like Fata Morgana. Kuaihelani was in the region of Kahiki (Kukulu o Kahiki). She stays close to her mother's fireplace with the fire-keeper Lono-makua. Her older sister Nā-maka-o-Kahaʻi, a sea goddess, fears that Pele's ambition will smother the homeland and drives Pele away. Kāmohoaliʻi takes Pele south in a canoe called Honua-i-a-kea, along with her younger sister Hiʻiaka and her brothers Kāmohoaliʻi, Kāne-milo-hai, Kāne-apua, arriving at the islets above Hawaiʻi. There Kāne-milo-hai is left on Mokupapapa, a reef, to build it up for human residence. On Nihoa, 800 feet above the ocean, Pele leaves Kāne-apua after her visit to Lehua and after crowning a wreath of kau-noʻa. Pele feels sorry for her younger brother and picks him up again. She uses the divining rod Paʻoa to pick a new home. A group of chants tells of a pursuit by Nāmakaokahaʻi, who tears Pele apart. Her bones, KaiwioPele, form a hill on Kahikinui, while her spirit escaped to the island of Hawaiʻi.

=== Flood version ===
In another version, Pele comes from a land said to be "close to the clouds", with parents Kāne-hoa-lani and Ka-hina-liʻi and brothers Ka-moho-aliʻi and Kahuila-o-ka-lani. From her husband Wahieloa (also called Wahialoa) she has a daughter, Laka, and a son, Menehune. Pele-kumu-honua entices her husband and Pele searches for him. The sea pours from her head over the land of Kanaloa (perhaps the island now known as Kahoʻolawe) and her brothers say:

O the sea, the great sea!
Forth bursts the sea:
Behold, it bursts on Kanaloa!

The sea floods the land, then recedes; this flooding is called Kai a Kahinaliʻi ("The sea of Ka-hina-liʻi"), as Pele's connection to the sea was passed down from her mother Kahinaliʻi.

=== Pele and Poliʻahu ===
Pele is considered to be a rival of the Hawaiian goddess of snow, Poliʻahu, and her sisters Lilinoe (a goddess of fine rain), Waiau (goddess of Lake Waiau), and Kahoupokane (a kapa-maker whose kapa-making activities create thunder, rain, and lightning). All but Kahoupokane reside on Mauna Kea. The kapa-maker lives on Hualālai.

One myth says that Poliʻahu came from Mauna Kea with her friends to attend sled races down the grassy hills south of Hāmākua. Pele came disguised as a beautiful stranger and was greeted by Poliʻahu, but Pele became jealously enraged at the goddess of Mauna Kea. She opened the caverns of Mauna Kea and threw fire from them toward Poliʻahu, with the snow goddess fleeing towards the summit. Poliʻahu then grabbed her now-burning snow mantle and threw it over the mountain. Earthquakes shook the island as the snow mantle unfolded until it reached the fire fountains, chilling and hardening the lava. The rivers of lava were driven back to Mauna Loa and Kīlauea. Later battles also led to Pele's defeat and confirmed the supremacy of the snow goddesses in the northern part of the island and Pele in the southern part.

=== Pele, Hiʻiaka, and Lohiʻau ===
In one account of the Pele myths, her older sister Nāmakaokahaʻi banishes her from Tahiti for creating hot spots and convinces the rest of her family that Pele will burn them all. Then, Pele travels on the canoe Honuaiakea to find a new home with her brother Kāmohoaliʻi. Her mother gave her an egg to take care of and it later hatches into a baby girl whom Pele names Hiʻiaka-i-ka-poli-o-Pele (Hiʻiaka in the Bosom of Pele), or Hiʻiaka for short. Pele encourages Hiʻiaka to befriend the people of Puna, but when Hiʻiaka becomes best friends with a girl named Hōpoe, Pele becomes jealous of their friendship. Pele sees Lohiʻau, a chief of Kauaʻi, in a dream, sending Hiʻiaka to bring him to her in forty days. When Hiʻiaka seeks out Lohiʻau, she discovers he is dead, but calls upon the power of the sorcery goddess Uli to revive him. As Hiʻiaka is on her journey, Pele grows impatient and sends a lava flow to Hōpoe's home before the forty days are up. When Hiʻiaka returns to Hawaiʻi with Lohiʻau, she sees Hōpoe covered in stone and knows Pele is responsible. Hiʻiaka spitefully embraces Lohiʻau in Pele's view, further angering Pele, who then covers Lohiʻau with lava as well. The sisters see that their anger led to the death of the two people who meant the most to them, so Pele apologetically brings Lohiʻau back to life and lets him choose between them. Lohiʻau choosies Hiʻiaka, but Pele gives them her blessing.

In another version of the myth, Pele hears the beating of drums and chanting coming from Kauaʻi while she is sleeping and travels there in her spirit form. She disguises herself as a beautiful young woman and meets Lohiʻau. After three days of lovemaking, Pele returns to Hawaiʻi and Lohiʻau dies of a broken heart.

== Modern times ==
Belief in Pele continued after the old religion was officially abolished in 1819. In the summer of 1823 English missionary William Ellis toured the island to determine locations for mission stations. After a long journey to the volcano Kīlauea with little food, Ellis eagerly ate the wild berries he found growing there. The berries of the ʻōhelo (Vaccinium reticulatum) plant are considered sacred to Pele. Traditionally prayers and offerings to Pele were always made before eating the berries. The volcano crater was an active lava lake, which the natives feared was a sign that Pele was not pleased with the violation.

Although wood carvings and thatched temples were easily destroyed, the volcano was a natural monument to the goddess.

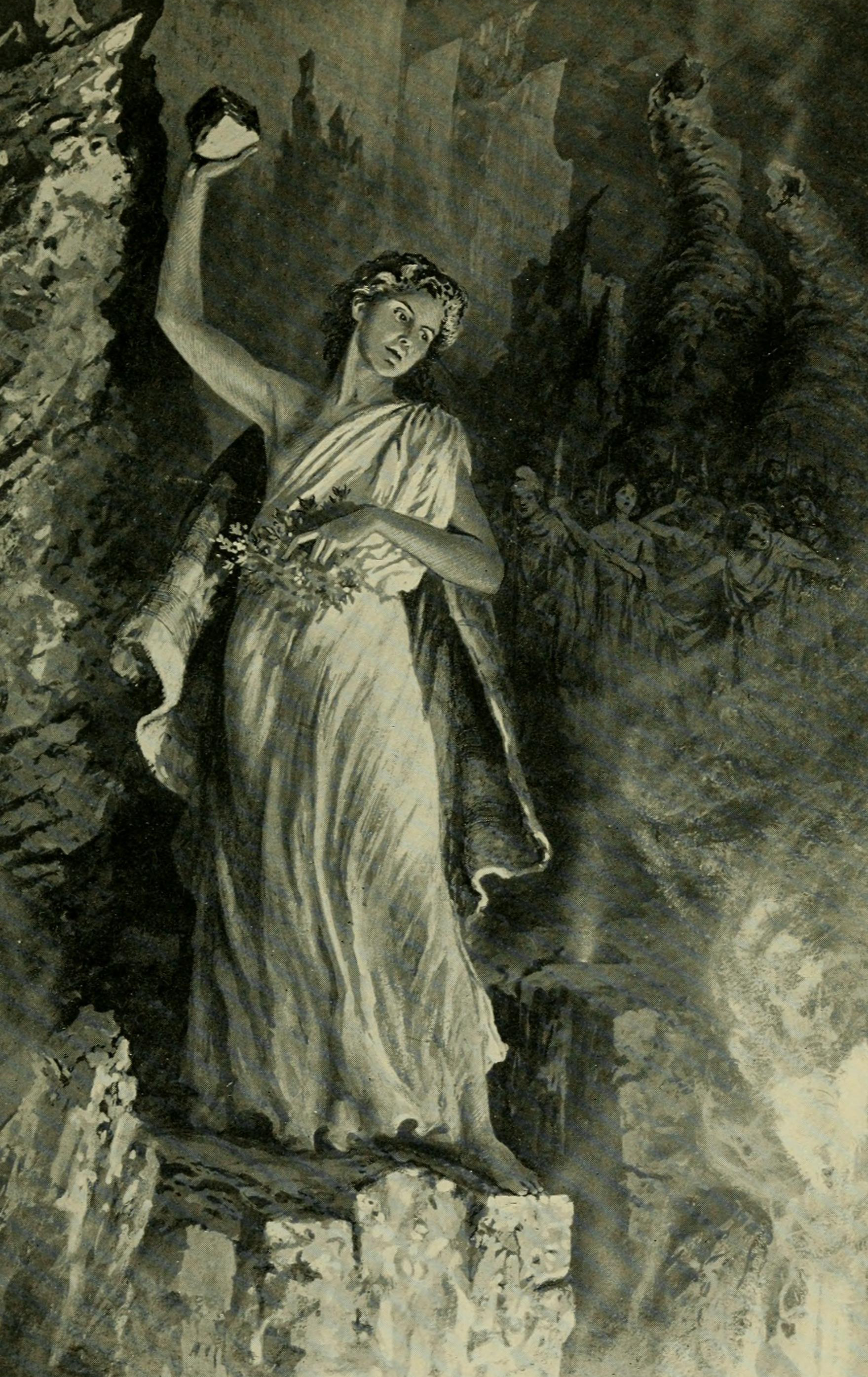
Kapiʻolani defying the volcano goddess Pele

In December 1824 the High Chiefess Kapiʻolani descended into Halemaʻumaʻu after reciting a Christian prayer instead of the traditional Hawaiian one to Pele. As it was predicted, she survived and this story was often told by missionaries to show the superiority of their faith. Alfred, Lord Tennyson (1809–1892) wrote a poem about the incident in 1892.

An urban legend states that Pele herself occasionally warns locals of impending eruptions. Appearing in the form of either a beautiful young woman or an elderly woman with white hair, sometimes accompanied by a small white dog, and always dressed in a red muumuu, Pele is said to walk along the roads near Kīlauea, but will vanish if passersby stop to help her, similar to the Resurrection Mary or vanishing hitchhiker legend. The passerby is then obliged to warn others or suffer misfortune in the next eruption. Another legend, Pele's Curse, states that Pele's wrath will fall on anyone who removes items from her island. Every year numerous small natural items are returned by post to the National Park Service by tourists seeking Pele's forgiveness. It is believed Pele's Curse was invented in the mid-20th century to deter tourist depredation.

When businessman George Lycurgus ran a hotel at the rim of Kīlauea, called the Volcano House from 1904 through 1921, he would often "pray" to Pele for the sake of the tourists. Park officials frowned upon his practices of tossing items, such as gin bottles (after drinking their contents), into the crater.

William Hyde Rice included an 11-page summary of the legends of Pele in his 1923 collection of Hawaiian legends, a reprint of which is available online from the Bernice P. Bishop Museum's Special Publications section.

In 2003 the Volcano Art Center had a special competition for Pele paintings to replace one done in the early 20th century by D. Howard Hitchcock displayed in the Hawaii Volcanoes National Park visitors center. The existing portrait of what looked like a blond Caucasian as the Hawaiian goddess had been criticized by many Native Hawaiians. Over 140 paintings were submitted, and finalists were displayed at sites within the park. The winner of the contest was artist Arthur Johnsen of Puna. This version shows the goddess in shades of red, with her digging staff Pāʻoa in her left hand, and an embryonic form of her sister goddess Hiʻiaka in her right hand. The painting is now on display at the Kīlauea Visitor Center.

The religious group Love Has Won briefly moved to Hawaii and sparked violent protests from locals after claiming their founder Amy Carlson was Pele.

Pele is among the gods and goddesses depicted in Walt Disney's Enchanted Tiki Room at the Disney Parks. She is voiced by Ginny Tyler.

In June 2025, Austrian violinist Markus Mars released "Pele's Fire", an experimental looping piece based on recording environmental sounds of the Hawaiʻi Volcanoes National Park while Kīlauea was erupting earlier the same year.

== Relatives ==
Pele's other prominent relatives are:

- Ai-kanaka, friend
- Ahu-i-maiʻa-pa-kanaloa, brother, name translates to "banana bunch of Kanaloa's field"
- Haumea, mother of Pele
- Hiʻiaka or Hiʻiaka-i-ka-pua-ʻenaʻena, sister, spirit of the dance, lei maker, healer
- Hina-aliʻi, mother and takes different forms
- Ka-maiau, war god, relative to Pele and Hiʻiaka
- Kā-moho-aliʻi, a shark god and the keeper of the water of life
- Kāne-ʻapua, demigod younger brother
- Kamapuaʻa, a shapeshifting kupua and a recurring figure in Hawaiian folklore, sometimes described as the consort of Pele
- Kāne-Hekili, spirit of the thunder (a hunchback)
- Kāne-hoa-lani, father and division with fire
- Kaʻōhelo, a mortal sister
- Kapo, a goddess of fertility
- Ka-poho-i-kahi-ola, spirit of explosions
- Ke-ō-ahi-kama-kaua, the spirit of lava fountains (a hunchback)
- Ke-ua-a-ke-pō, spirit of the rain and fire
- Nāmaka, appeared as a sea goddess or water spirit in Pele cycle, sister of Pele
- Tama-ehu, brother, god of salamanders and fire in Tahitian
- Ulupoka, enemy from Polynesian mythology
- Wahieloa, husband with whom she fathered sons Laka and Menehune

== Chants ==
Lapakū ka wahine aʻo Pele i Kahiki
ʻOaka e ka lani noke nō
ʻEliʻeli kau mai
ʻOaka e ka lani noke nō
ʻEliʻeli kau mai
ʻUhī a ʻuhā mai ana ʻo Pele
I ka lua aʻo Halemaʻumaʻu

—
Translation:

Pele is active in Tahiti
Continuously flashing in the heavens
May profound reverence alight
Continuously flashing in the heavens
May profound reverence alight indeed
Rumbling, puffing, Pele comes
To the crater at Halemaʻumaʻu.

Mai ka Lua aʻu i hele mai nei, mai Kīlauea,
Ke kui ʻia maila e nā wāhine o ka Lua ē
ʻO Puna lehua ʻula i ka papa
I ʻula i ka papa ka lehua o Puna

—
Translation:

From the crater I've come, from Kīlauea,
The women of the caldera have strung leis
The foundation of Puna is crimson, covered in lehua blossoms.
Sacred is the fountain covered with the lehua blossoms of Puna

Both of the chants above were performed at Halemaʻumaʻu, where it is said Pele currently resides.

== Other data ==
Pele shares features similar to other malignant deities inhabiting volcanoes, as in the case of the devil Guayota of Guanche Mythology in Canary Islands (Spain), living on the volcano Teide and was considered by the aboriginal Guanches as responsible for the eruptions of the volcano.

== In geology ==
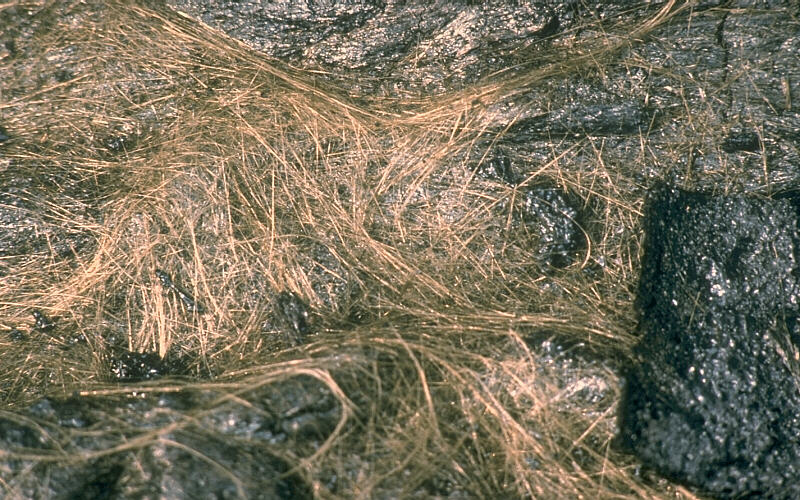
Pele's hair, a volcanic glass in strands

Several phenomena connected to volcanism have been named after her, including Pele's hair, Pele's tears, and Limu o Pele (Pele's seaweed). A volcano on the Jovian moon Io is also named Pele.

Myths about Pele encode dateable natural events. The chronology of Pele's journey corresponds with the geological age of the Hawaiian islands.

In 2006, one volcanologist suggested the battle between Pele and Hiʻiaka was inspired by geological events around 1500 AD.

== See also ==
- Painting of Pele
- Aganju, god of volcanoes in the Lucumi/santeria religion
- Mahuika, goddess of fire in Māori mythology
- Rūaumoko, god of earthquakes, volcanoes and seasons in Māori mythology
- Ti'iti'i, god of fire in Samoan mythology
- Vulcan, ancient Roman god of fire
- Boys for Pele
