= Nuʻu =

Character in Hawaiian religion

In Hawaiian religion, Nuʻu was a man who built an ark with which he escaped a Great Flood. He landed his vessel on top of Mauna Kea on the Big Island. Nuʻu mistakenly attributed his safety to the moon, and made sacrifices to it. Kāne, the creator god, descended to earth on a rainbow and explained Nuʻu's mistake. The myth has been interpreted as depicting the hazards of the Oceanian environment and local peoples' ability to withstand them. Missionaries to Hawaii in the 19th century considered him analogous to Noah of the Bible.
