= Kamapuaʻa =

Male fertility deity in Hawaiian mythology

- Hog-man fertility demigod
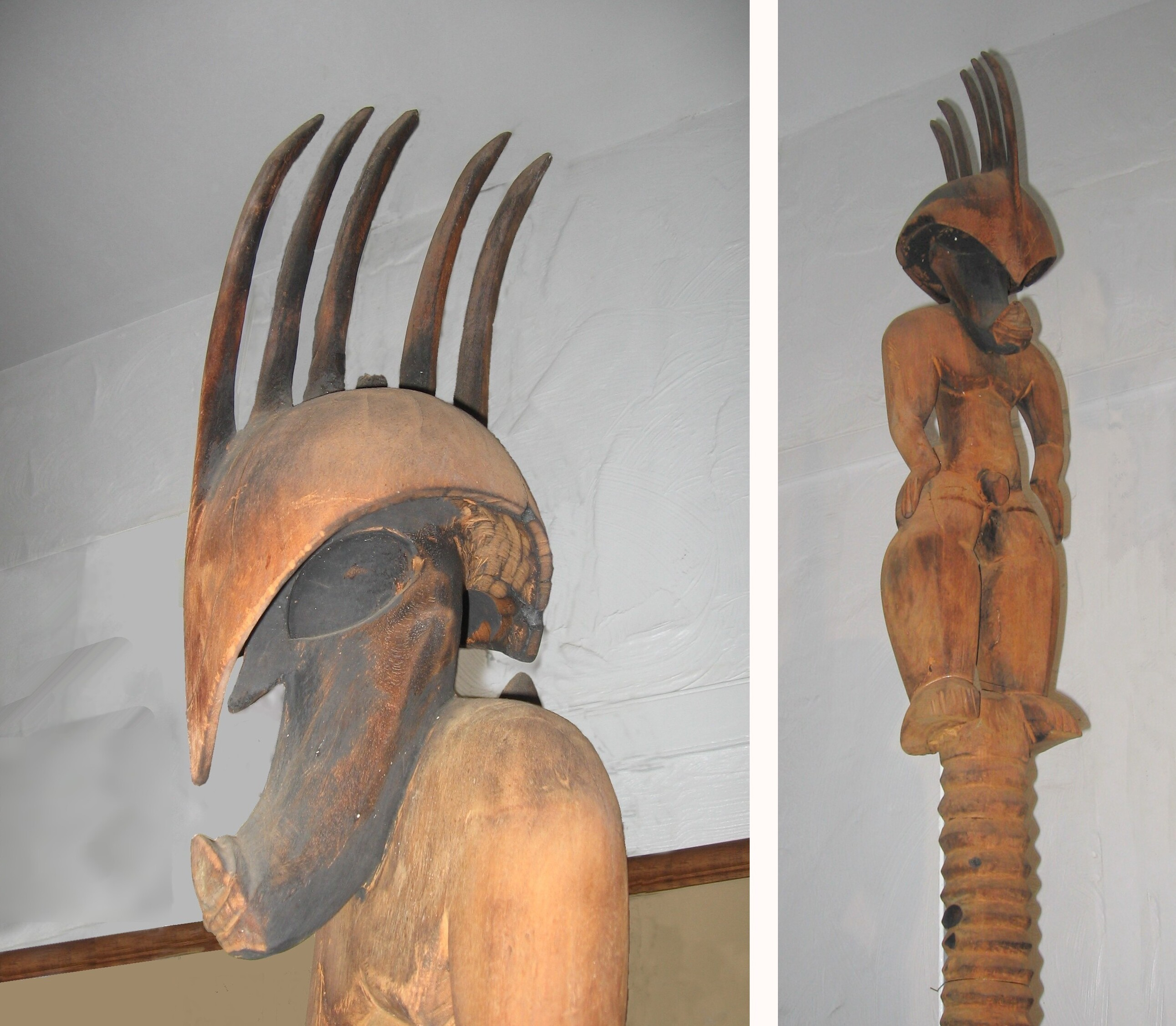
- Pre-missionary wooden statue of Kamapuaʻa, Bailey House Museum
- Affiliation: Kupua; Lono
- Animals: Hog; Humuhumunukunukuāpuaʻa
- Tree: Kukui
- Gender: Male
- Region: Maui, Oahu

Genealogy
- Parents: Kahikiula (father); Hina (mother)
- Siblings: Kahikihonuakele (brother)
- Consort: Pele
- Offspring: Kaʻowakaikalani (daughter)

In Hawaiian mythology, Kamapuaʻa ("hog child") is a hog-man fertility superhuman associated with Lono, the god of agriculture. The son of Hina and Kahikiula, the chief of Oahu, Kamapuaʻa was particularly connected with the island of Maui.

A kupua (demigod), Kamapuaʻa is best known for his romantic pursuit of the fire goddess Pele, with whom he shared a turbulent relationship. Despite Pele's power, Kamapuaʻa's persistence allows him to turn her lava rock into fertile soil.

He is linked with the humuhumunukunukuāpua'a (reef triggerfish), the state fish of Hawaiʻi.

Lilikalā Kameʻeleihiwa describes him as "defiant of all authority, bold and untamed," and states that he "recalls the pig nature that is dormant in most people . . . . Treacherous and tender, he thirsts after the good things in life—adventure, love, and sensual pleasure . . . ."

== Early life ==
Kamapua’a was born to human parents, Kahikiula and Hina, on Oahu. He is recorded as having one brother, Kahikihonuakele. There are also many stories involving his grandmother, whom he seems to be very close to. There is not a lot of information on his childhood.

Growing up, Kamapuaʻa was never accepted by his stepfather, Olopana. This hurt Kamapuaʻa because he wanted his father to love him and be proud of him, but Olopana never showed him any love and mocked him instead. Kamapuaʻa grew with anger and let rage take over his soul. This led to his reputation of being mischievous and a rascal.

== Adult life ==
Kamapuaʻa grows up to be a handsome, talented man. His talents made Olopana very angry. Wounded at Olopanaʻs disapproval, Kamapuaʻa leaves for the hills to calm himself, where he spends his time scavenging and growing stronger. Later he engages in many battles with Olopana and Pele, eventually killing Olopana brutally.

== Mythology ==
In Maui the kukui is a symbol of enlightenment, protection and peace. It was said that Kamapua'a could transform into a kukui tree. One of the legends told of Kamapua'a: one day, a man beat his wife to death and buried her beneath Kamapua'a while he was in tree form. Because he saw that the woman had been a good person, he raised her to new life, but damned her husband to death. One well known myth involves Olopana and some birds. Being the Trickster that he was, one day Kamapua’a stole some chickens from Olopana, who was enraged at the theft. Olopana sent his warriors after Kamapua’a, who, along with his own followers, fought back, until it became clear they could not win. Kamapua’a took his followers and fled until they came up against a waterfall where they were cornered. It was at this time that Kamapua’a transformed into a hog which his followers used to climb to the next level of the falls and to freedom. His pig-form dammed up the water of Kaliuwa‘a where they were. Olopana's men pursued. As they trekked up Kaliuwa‘a, Kamapua‘a released the water killing all but Olopana. Olopana flees to Wai‘anae where he ultimately loses to Kamapua‘a.

== Kamapua’a and Pele ==
There are contradictory stories depicting the relationship between Kamapua’a and Pele. In some versions they are described as enemies (Hawaiian Romance), in others they are depicted as lovers or husband and wife (Hawaiian folk tales). One story of how Pele and Kamapua’a met starts off with Kamapua’a on a journey to Pele's home. Kamapua’a tried to impress Pele and her sisters by looking like a handsome man. He impressed her sisters but Pele is not impressed, instead she insults Kamapua’a by calling him a pig. This upsets Kamapua’a, which then turned their conversation into an argument of insults to each other. Kamapua’a tried to get closer to Pele but Pele sent her flames to him leaving him in a pit of fire. Kamapua’a strikes back by summoning his sister Makahanaloa; she puts out the fire with fog and rain, and hogs run all over the place. All that is left are the fire sticks; Pele accepts her defeat. Kamapua’a takes the sticks and divides the districts giving Pele the districts overrun with lava flows; he takes the Windward districts with the most rain. Kamapua’a leaves Hawaii and starts a family in the ocean where he belongs; Pele now loves Kamapua’a and tries to get him back with a love chant. As Kamapua’a lives his life in the ocean, he still watches over his side of the island. He ventures through the ocean in his new form the humu-humu-nuku-nuku apua’a. He never steps foot on the island again because he doesn't want to run into Pele. Kamapuaʹa later returned to the island as a handsome man and had sex with Pele. Their union produced a baby girl whom Pele named Kaʹowakaikalani.
