= Haumea (mythology) =

Goddess of fertility and childbirth in Hawaiian mythology

- Goddess of fertility and childbirth
- Gender: Female
- Region: Hawaii
- Ethnic group: Hawaiians
- Consort: Mulinaha, Kanaloa
- Offspring: Pele, Kāne Milohaʻi, Kāmohoaliʻi, Nāmaka, Kapo, Hiʻiaka, Laumiha, Kahaʻula, Kahakauakoko, and Kauakahi

Haumea (Hawaiian: [hɐwˈmɛjə]) is the goddess of fertility and childbirth in Hawaiian mythology. She is the mother of many important deities, such as Pele, Kāne Milohaʻi, Kāmohoaliʻi, Nāmaka, Kapo, and Hiʻiaka. She was killed by Kaulu. Haumea is one of the most important Hawaiian gods, and her worship is among the oldest on the Hawaiian islands.

== Mythology ==
With the help of a magic stick called the Mākālei, Haumea repeatedly transforms herself from an old woman to a young girl, and returns to her homeland periodically to marry one of her offspring, thus giving birth to continuous generations of humans. Eventually, her identity is found out by Kio, which angers her, causing her to leave humanity behind.

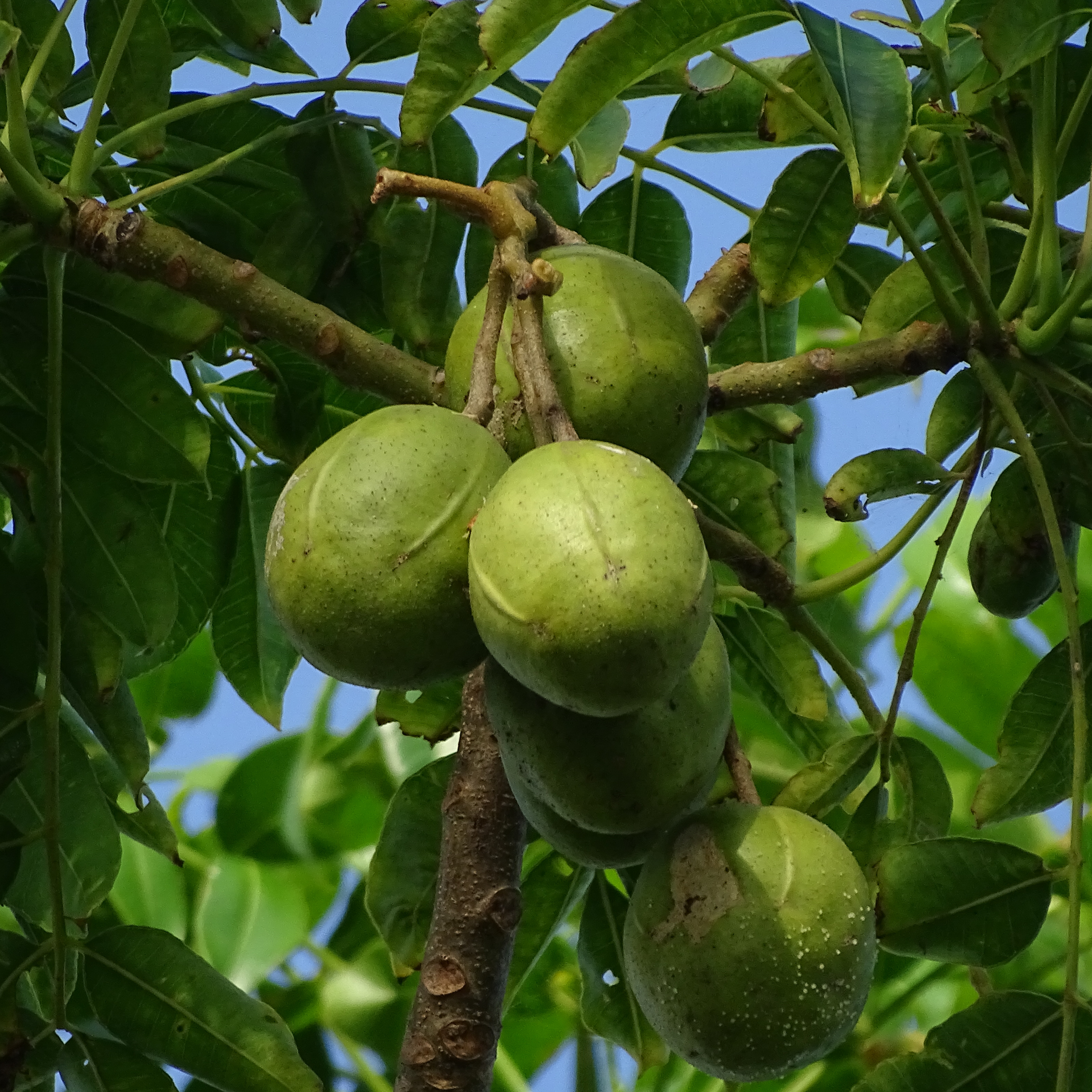
The Kani-ka-wi tree (Spondias dulcis or June plum) is associated with Haumea, who created a potion from it to help women give birth.

Haumea is said to have given humans the ability to give birth naturally. In a story, she visited Muleiula, the daughter of a chieftain who was experiencing painful childbirth, during which she discovered that humans only gave birth by cutting open the mother. Seeing this, Haumea created a potion out of the Kani-ka-wī tree (Spondias dulcis), which allowed the mother to push out the baby naturally.

== Relationships ==
Haumea is the sister of the gods Kāne and Kanaloa, and sometimes also the wife of Kanaloa. Some traditions identify Haumea with Papahānaumoku, the goddess of the Earth, and wife of the sky god Wākea.

=== Offspring ===
With Kanaloa, Haumea gave birth to the war god Kekaua-kahi, the volcano goddess Pele, as well as Pele's brothers and sisters, including Hiʻiaka. Except for Pele, who was born the normal way, her children were born from various parts of her body. From her head, for example, were born Laumiha, Kahaʻula, Kahakauakoko, and Kauakahi.

==== Kumulipo ====
According to the Kumulipo, a Hawaiian creation chant, Haumea's offspring are as follows. (Note that the macrons are missing, but the ʻokinas should be correct.)

- Children by Mulinaha:
  - Laumiha
  - Kahaʻula
  - Kahakauakoko
- Children by Kanaloa:
  - Kauakahi
- Grandchildren:
  - Kauahulihonua
  - Haloa
  - Waia
  - Hinanalo
  - Nanakahili
  - Wailoa
  - Kiʻo (last born)

== Legacy ==
On September 17, 2008, the International Astronomical Union named the fifth known dwarf planet in the Solar System Haumea. The dwarf planet's two moons were named after Haumea's daughters: Hiʻiaka, the goddess born from the mouth of Haumea, and Namaka, the water spirit born from Haumea's body.

== See also ==
- Haumia-tiketike
- Papahānaumoku
