= Ukupanipo =

Water deity

- Shark god of fishing
- Venerated in: Hawaiian religion

In Hawaiian mythology, Ukupanipo is a shark god who controls the amount of fish close enough for the fisherman to catch. He occasionally adopts a human child who gains the power to transform into a shark, but when in human form has a mark like a shark's mouth under their shoulder blades.
