= Nanaue =

Hawaiian god of sharks

- God of sharks
- Abodes: Waipio; Poniu-o-Hua

Genealogy
- Died: Kainalu or Molokaʻi
- Parents: Kāmohoaliʻi (father); Kalei (mother)

Nanaue is a demigod from Hawaiian mythology. He is described as a man with the mouth of a shark on his back who can shapeshift into a giant shark.

== Mythology ==
Nanaue is the son of Kāmohoaliʻi, who is the king of sharks. He was born with a shark's mouth on his back. As a boy, Nanaue's mother, Kalei, told him to never eat meat as it would give him a craving for flesh. However, when he turned was young his grandmother fed him meat, as she wanted him to grow into a warrior, and he began to crave human flesh. He took up residence in Kaneana cave where he would leave human bodies to rot before eating them, as he found rotted flesh to be tastiest.

When Nanaue was a man, ʻUmi-a-Līloa, the king of Hawaii, issued an order for all men to till a large plantation for the king. When Nanaue worked, other workers took off his clothing, revealing his shark mouth on his back. He bit many of the other men, and the King deduced that Nanaue was responsible for the disappearances of humans into the Kaneana cave. The King had Nanaue tied to a stake to be burned alive, but Nanaue prayed to his father and escaped, shapeshifting into a shark to swim away.

Nanaue swam from the island of Hawaii to Maui. There, he married the sister of a chief, and tried to stop his habit of eating people, but fell to the temptation and resumed his activities. He was caught in the act, and once again fled, this time to Molokai. There he was caught once again, and captured in nets. The people of Molokai prayed to the demigod Unauna, who burned Nanaue alive.
