= Hiʻiaka =

Hawaiian goddess of hula

- Patron goddess of hula dancers, chant, sorcery, and medicine
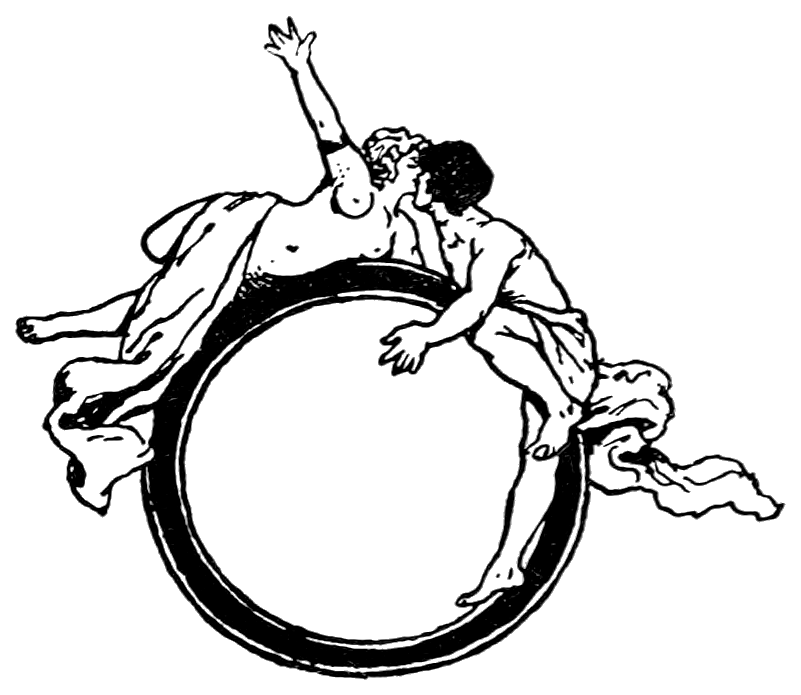
- Hiʻiaka and Lohiʻau as shown in W. D. Westervelt's Hawaiian Legends of Volcanoes
- Other names: Hiʻiakaikapoliopele
- Venerated in: Hawaiian religion
- Abode: Lehua grove
- Animals: Pueo (owl)
- Gender: Female

Genealogy
- Parents: Kāne (father); Haumea (mother)
- Siblings: Pele; Laka; Kapo
- Consort: Lohiʻau

In Hawaiian religion, Hiʻiaka is a daughter of Haumea and Kāne.

Hiʻiakaikapoliopele is the Hawaiian patron goddess of hula dancers, chant, sorcery, and medicine. Born in Tahiti and brought by her sister Pelehonuamea to Hawaii, Hi'iaka is also known as the goddess of hula. She played a significant role in the story of Lohi'au, where she embarked on a dangerous journey to bring him to Pele. Throughout her quest, Hi'iaka discovered her powers as a healer of land, making it fertile and causing growth. She also defeated many monsters and faced various challenges with the help of companions and gifts from Pele. In the end, after Pele destroyed Hi'iaka's sacred forest and lover, Lohi'au was given the choice of who to be with, resulting in different versions of the legend's conclusion. Hiʻiaka had multiple sisters, and together they represented various aspects of nature and life in Hawaii.

== Attributes and history ==
Hiʻiaka is the patron goddess of hula dancers, chant, sorcery, and medicine. Pueo (owls) are her messengers and are sacred to her. Conceived in Tahiti, Hiʻiaka was carried in the form of an egg to Hawaiʻi by her sister Pele, who kept the egg with her at all times to incubate it. Thus, the name "Hiʻiaka" means "carried egg," as "hiʻi" means to hold or carry in the arms (as a child) and "aka" means "embryo." Hiʻiaka's full name, Hiʻiaka-i-ka-poli-o-Pele, also refers to the story as it translates as "Hiʻiaka in the bosom of Pele." Her family line is called Hiʻiaka, and they take on the task of bearing the clouds, providing rain, thunder, and lightning, variously produced by storms and by Pele's volcanoes. Hiʻiaka lived in a grove of lehua trees which are sacred to her where she spent her days dancing with the forest spirits. Hiʻiaka is Pele's favorite and most loyal sister, although they also have their differences. Hiʻiaka was the first god of the Pele family born in Hawaiʻi.

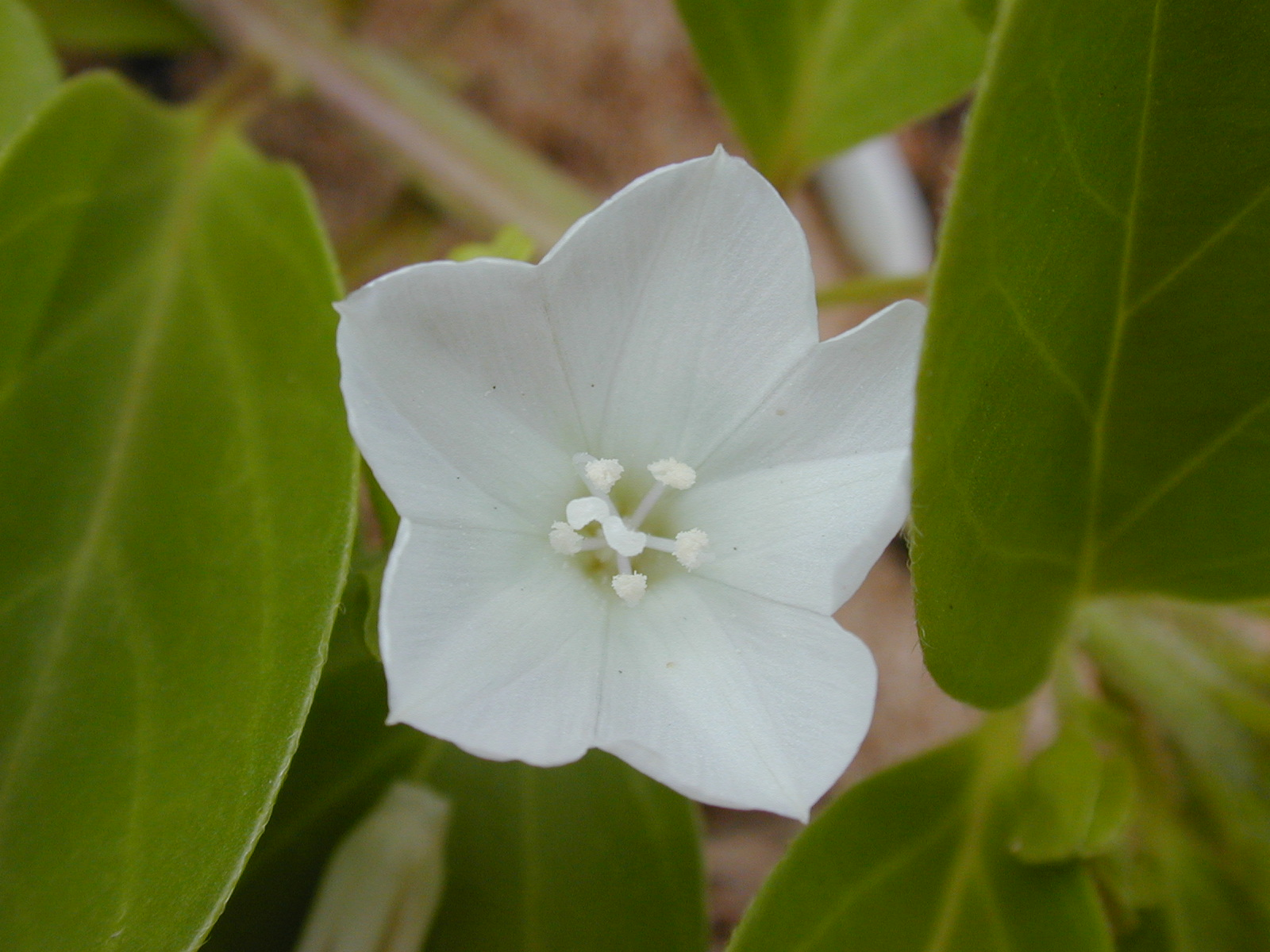
This is known as Pau o Hi'iaka, also known as "The Skirt of Hi'iaka," it is commonly used as a cathartic and to treat babies with thrush. It is an excellent plant for ground coverage in arid places. The flower is mainly found on the Hawaiian Islands on rocky coastal sites.

== Goddess of Hula and the importance of traditions ==
Hiʻiaka was the first to dance hula after her eldest sister Pele asked her to do so. Therefore, Hiʻiaka is known as a goddess of hula, along with Laka and Kapo (other sisters of Pele). In hula hālau (schools), there are ceremonies for these goddesses.

Oli kāhea are chants asking for permission to enter a place (such as someone's home or a ceremony). These chants are also used when asking someone intelligent, such as a teacher, to share their knowledge. Oli kāhea are used to ask for permission to enter a forest, since many forests are considered homes of the gods. In hula hālau, oli and mele kāhea are chanted by the haumana (students) who use them to request that their kumu (teachers) allow them entry into the hālau. When chanting oli kāhea, Hawaiians are taught to be humble and to have good ʻano (proper spirit and intention).

The importance of mele kahea and the responsibility of those receiving mele kahea is seen in different parts of Hiʻiaka's quest to Lohiʻau. For example, when the chief of Maui denied Hiʻiaka hospitality after she asked for permission to enter his home through her mele kahea, Hiʻiaka punished him. When the chief was sleeping, Hiʻiaka caught his spirit after it left his body, and killed it, thereby killing him. Therefore, Hawaiians are taught that being on both the giving and receiving parts of oli (chants) require respect and mindfulness of our actions.

== Lohiʻau ==
In the best known story, Pele once fell into a deep sleep and left her body to wander, and was lured by the sound of a hula-drum accompanied by a wonderful voice. In the Epic Tale of Hiʻiakaikapoliopele, it is said that Pele did not accidentally hear the sounds of the drums and voices. Instead, this version says that Kanikawi and Kanikawa (the gods of Lohiʻau and his people) wanted Pele to specifically hear Lohiʻau, and later become his wife. She appeared in spirit at a festival on Kauaʻi (in most versions of the legend; another variation has her visit Kauaʻi physically while first seeking a home) where she fell in love with the singer, a young chief named Lohiʻau. Hiʻiaka had been watching over her, and after nine days she grew worried and sang an incantation to bring Pele back. Upon her return, Pele longed for Lohiʻau and decided to send a messenger to bring him to her. Hiʻiaka volunteered to go on the dangerous journey, as long as Pele would protect her sacred grove of Lehua trees and her beloved friend, Hōpoe (meaning "one encircled, as with a lei or with loving arms").

Pele agreed to Hiʻiaka's request, but insisted that she return with Lohiʻau within 40 days. She also instructed Hiʻiaka not to fall in love with Lohiʻau, or even embrace him.

=== Gifts/Tools ===
Before Hiʻiaka left for her quest, Pele gifted her with three tools to help her face the trials throughout the quest. The first gift was ʻAwihikalani (a critical eye), to help her to foretell the future encounters she would face, communicate with spirits, and grant her the ability to have supernatural knowledge. The second gift was called Ka lima ikaika o Kīlauea (the "strong arm" of Kilauea), to help her defeat her opponents in battle with super strength. The last gift was Paʻu uila (lightning skirt), this skirt had different abilities to help her along her journey. This skirt also had extreme importance due to the fact that it is a female garment, showing the significance of supernatural women in Hawaiʻi not being ruled by male gods.

=== Companions ===
Paʻuopalapalai (Fern Skirt) was a loyal servant to the Pele family for so long that she had become like a spirit. Therefore, she was trusted to be Hiʻiaka's companion on the journey. After the two left Kīlauea, they met a very devout and pious woman named Wahine ʻOmaʻo (Green Woman), who joined them on the journey after she made her offerings to Pele. Wahine ʻOmaʻo was a half-goddess. She was the only companion of Hiʻiaka who completed the entire journey with her.

=== Journey/Battles of Hiʻiaka ===
Hiʻiaka's journey was filled with many adventures, such as dueling with the kupua (demons) of the island forests.

When the travelers arrived at Puna ma Kai, they met a gorgeous princess named Papulehu. She gifted them with red lehua and maile lei. These are the plants that Puna is famous for. She was kind and gracious, however, she was not devout and did not take the time for prayers. Therefore, she did not last the first battle of the journey. Since she did not pray, she had no spiritual sight during the battle against the moʻo Panaʻewa, whom she was eaten by. Panaʻewa could change into different forms like kino-ohu (fog), kino-au-awa (sharp rain), and kukui (candle-nut tree). Hiʻiaka defeated Panaʻewa by trapping her and her followers within a thickening of vines. Many more moʻo, as well as other monsters, are defeated as they traveled across Hawaiʻi. They also had the help of war gods (named Kuliliaukaua and Kekakoʻi), as well as shell-conch blowers (named Kamaiau, Kahinihini, and Mapu).

When passing through Maui, Hiʻiaka and Wahine ʻOmaʻo are denied hospitality by Chief Olepau in ʻĪao Valley. Hiʻiaka punished him with death by catching his second soul (after it left his body and wandered while he was sleeping). She pounded his body against Pahalele, the rock near Waiheʻe.

Hiʻiaka and Wahine ʻOmaʻo headed towards Oahu by passing by the extremely windy side of Molokai, called Kaunakakai. The women came across a moʻo tribe that was causing havoc to women of the area by taking their husbands. Therefore, Hiʻiaka and Wahine ʻOmaʻo exiled the moʻo tribe. They also defeated Kikipua, the mo'o woman who would eat travelers by tricking them that her tongue was a bridge. After she was defeated, Hiʻiaka used her paʻu as a bridge to Oʻahu for safe passage.

Hiʻiaka showed respect to her supernatural relatives, the rocks Maka-puʻu and Malei, when they arrived to the rocky side of Oʻahu through oli (chants). On Oʻahu, she also crushed Mokoliʻi, an evil moʻo, at Kualoa. When they arrived at Kaena point, Hiʻiaka pleaded the Rock-of-Kauaʻi to send her a canoe to paddle over to Kauaʻi. The Rock-of Kauaʻi traces back to Māui, when it was left at sea after his fishline broke. Hiʻiaka's request was granted and she arrived on Kauaʻi at Haʻena to finally reach Lohiʻau.

When at last Hiʻiaka reached Kauaʻi she found that the young chief had died from longing for Pele. She was able to revive him with chanting and prayer, but she was not able to return to Pele within 40 days. Pele, fearing that Hiʻiaka had betrayed her and was keeping the handsome chief for herself, became enraged and not only destroyed Hiʻiaka's sacred Lehua forest, but also killed Hōpoe, turning her into stone.

When Hiʻiaka returned, seeing her lover dead and her forest ravaged, she took revenge on Pele and embraced Lohiʻau. In retaliation, Pele sent waves of lava at the couple. Hiʻiaka was unharmed, but Lohiʻau was killed by the lava. Again, Hiʻiaka revived him, thus bringing him back to life twice.

Pele, regretting her actions toward Hiʻiaka's forest and lover, decided to let Lohiʻau choose who he wanted to be with. Some versions of the legend say that Lohiʻau chose Hiʻiaka over Pele and returned with her to Kauaʻi. Others say he decided to remain with the both of them. Still others say that he retreated to Kauaʻi alone.

The educational Hawaiian website, Living Hawaiian Culture Kumukahi, stated that "During this long and dangerous trip, Hiʻiaka realizes her own powers as a goddess. She is the healer of land. Pele creates new land and Hiʻiaka follows by healing the land, making it fertile and causing things to grow."

== Hiʻiaka sisters ==
There were "twelve" or "forty sisters", all daughters of Haumea. [The word /hiʻi-aka/ has the meaning of 'embryo', and is a compound of /hiʻi/ 'to hold or carry in the arms (scil., a child)' and /aka/ 'embryo at the moment of conception; carefully'.]

=== Hiʻiaka-i-ka-pua-ʻenaʻena ===
One sister included Hiʻiaka-i-ka-pua-ʻenaʻena: "The skin of any person she possessed reddened. She was also known as Kuku-ʻena-i-ke-ahi-hoʻomau-honua (beating hot in the perpetual earth fire), and in this guise she was ... guide to travelers lost in the wilderness, and vanished when they found their way. She was also known as Hiʻiaka-i-ka-puaaneane (Hiʻiaka in extreme old age). Lit., Hiʻiaka in the smoking heat."

=== Hiʻiaka-i-ka-poli-o-Pele ===
They also included Hiʻiaka-i-ka-poli-o-Pele: "One of her forms was the palaʻā lace fern ... one of the first plants to grow on new lava. ... She instituted the eating of fish from head to tail. ... Lit., Hiʻiaka in the bosom of Pele."

=== Defeating monsters ===
Soul-journey in "a deep sleep during which the spirit leaves her body":- "Hiʻiaka fights and overcomes a number of ... monsters.

- The moʻo woman Panaewa, who impedes her way first in the form of fog (kino-ohu), then of sharp rain (kino-au-awa), then of a candlenut (kukui) tree, she entangles ... in a growth of vine ... .
- Two moʻo, Kiha and Puaʻa-loa (Long hog), are caught in a flow of lava ... .
- The shark at the mouth of Waipio valley who seizes swimmers crossing the bay is met and slain.
- Moʻolau, chief of the jumping moʻo (mahiki) in the land of Mahiki-waena, is defied ... .
- Two moʻo, Pili and Noho, who make travelers pay toll at the bridge across the Wailuku river, are rent jaw to jaw and the way opened for free traffic."

=== Shamanic soul-catching ===
- "Refused hospitality at the home of the chief Olepau [or Kaulahea] in ʻĪao Valley, Hiʻiaka avenges the insult by catching his second soul, as it goes fluttering about as he lies sleeping, and dashing it against the rock Palahele near Waiheʻe."
- "Peleula is a famous makaula or seer, but Hiʻiaka prevails over her. Waihinano, the pert sorceress who defies her on Maui, has been brought up by Kapo and Pua, but Hiʻiaka catches and crushes to death the soul of the Maui chief for which they both contend. ... Pele gives Hiʻiaka to Paoa as his wife and he returns with her to Kauaʻi".

== See also ==
- Lilo & Stitch 2: Stitch Has a Glitch, based in part on the story of Hiʻiaka
- Hiʻiaka, moon of the dwarf planet Haumea, named after Hiʻiaka's mother.
