= (278361) 2007 JJ43 =

Classical Kuiper belt object

(278361) 2007 JJ_{43}
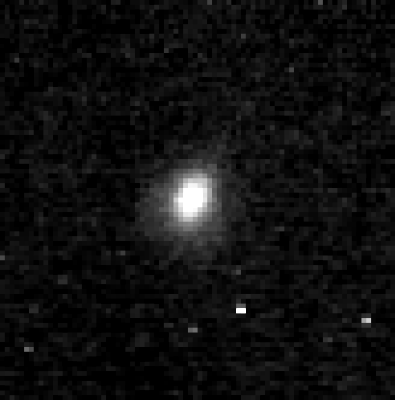
- Image of 2007 JJ_{43} from the Keck Observatory, slight elongation is probably due to atmospheric distortion.

Discovery
- Discovered by: Palomar Obs.
- Discovery site: Palomar Obs.
- Discovery date: 14 May 2007

Designations
- Minor planet category: TNO; ScatNear; 2:1 resonance with Neptune

Orbital characteristics(barycentric) (Note: These orbital elements are expressed in terms of the Solar System Barycenter (SSB) as the frame of reference. Due to planetary perturbations, the Sun revolves around the SSB at non-negligible distances, so heliocentric-frame orbital elements and distances (such as those given in JPL's Small-Body Database) can vary on short timescales.)
- Epoch 27 August 2011 (JD 2455800.5)
- Uncertainty parameter 2
- Observation arc: 7647 days (20.94 yr)
- Earliest precovery date: 10 May 2002 (NEAT)
- Aphelion: 56.2579 AU
- Perihelion: 40.3911 AU
- Semi-major axis: 48.3245 AU
- Eccentricity: 0.16417
- Orbital period (sidereal): 335.94 a (120801 d)
- Mean anomaly: 340.04°
- Inclination: 12.0393°
- Longitude of ascending node: 272.55°
- Time of perihelion: ≈ 2 April 2037 ±6 days
- Argument of perihelion: 6.454°
- Known satellites: 0

Physical characteristics
- Mean diameter: 444.7±2.4 km (2024); 598 km? (2026) (Note: (assuming albedo at 0.079)); 504±105 km (2021) >278.8±17 km (2020)
- Synodic rotation period: 12.097 h 6.04 h 4.83 h 9.66 h
- Geometric albedo: 0.13+0.09 −0.07 (Cluster average albedo, 2015); 0.11±0.09 (Median albedo, 2021); 0.079 (assumed) <0.36
- Spectral type: B-V = 1.020±0.028; V-R = 0.590±0.020; R-I = 0.500±0.020 g'-r' = 0.77±0.03 g'-i' = 1.12±0.04 r'-i' = 0.35±0.04; BR
- Apparent magnitude: 20.8; 20.35±0.265 (R-band)
- Absolute magnitude (H): 3.2 (R-band); 4.49; 3.9 (Hv); 4.50±0.45 (Hv)

(278361) 2007 JJ_{43} is a large trans-Neptunian object (TNO) orbiting the Sun near the outer edge of the Kuiper belt.

Its discovery images were taken in 2007, and its absolute magnitude of 4.5 is one of the twenty brightest exhibited by unnamed TNOs. It has a diameter of 444.7 ± 2.4 kilometres (276.3 ± 1.5 mi).

== History ==
=== Discovery ===
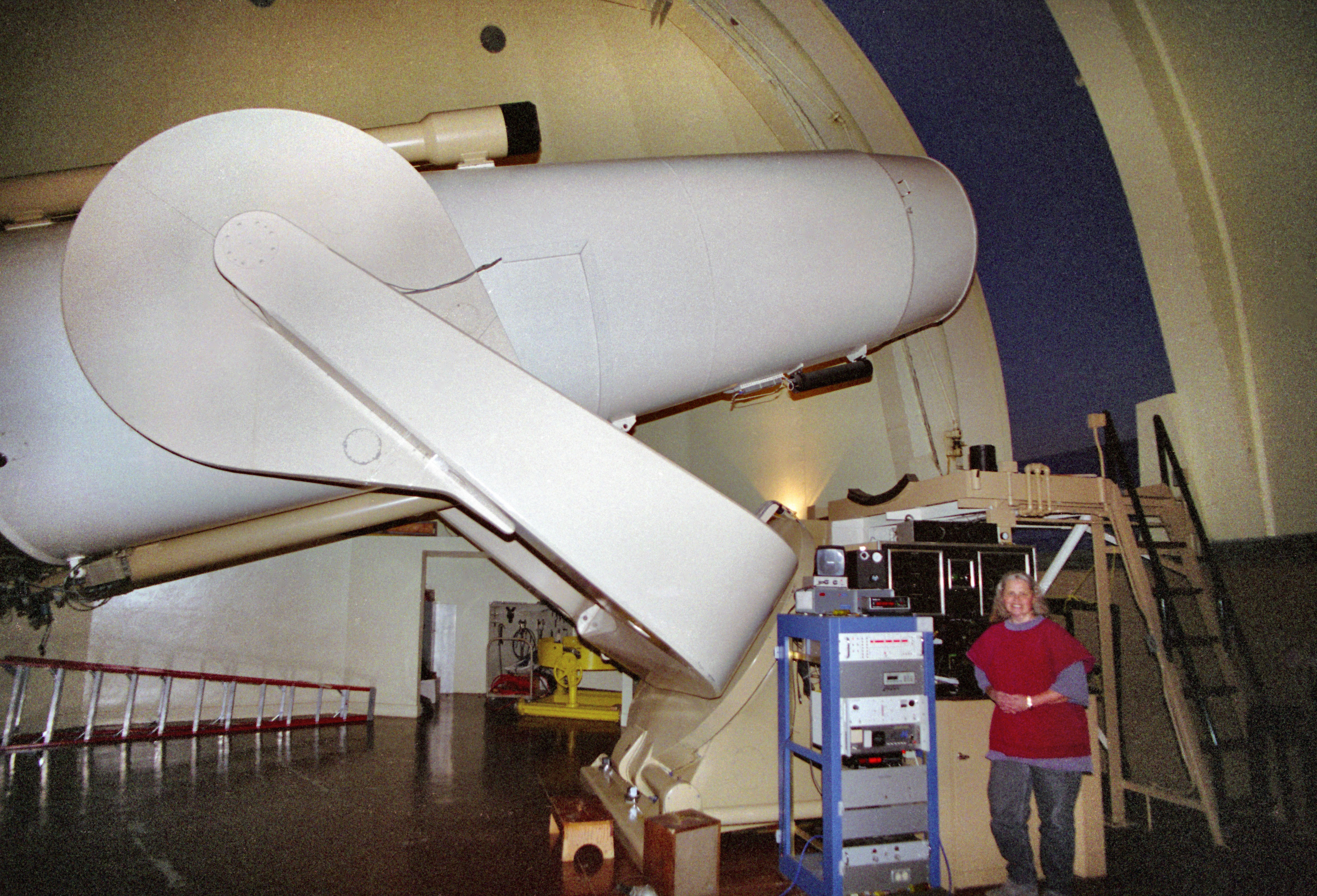
The 1.2-meter Samuel Oschin telescope that was used to discover 2007 JJ_{43} at Palomar Observatory on 14 May 2007

2007 JJ_{43} was discovered by the Palomar Mountain telescope with Megan Schwamb, Michael E. Brown, and David L. Rabinowitz on 14 May 2007, using discovery images taken by the 1.2-meter Samuel Oschin telescope at the Palomar Observatory in California. Its discovery was also a part of the Palomar Distant Solar System Survey, the survey aimed to find objects in the region around Sedna, farther than 50 AU from the Sun. The survey was designed to detect the orbital movements of distant objects that were at least 1,000 AU from the Sun. Its discovery was further announced on 5 July 2007. The object has precovery images back to 10 May 2002 by Palomar Mountain (NEAT).

=== Further observations ===
The observation arc of 2007 JJ_{43} begins with an observation on 10 May 2002 by Palomar Mountain (NEAT). Following this, 2007 JJ_{43} has been observed by various telescopes, including the Las Campanas Observatory, European Southern Observatory, and Palomar Mountain. As of September 2026, 209 observations of this object had been recorded for over a period of 20.94 years.

=== Provisional designation and numbering ===
The object was officially given the provisional designation of 2007 JJ_{43} by the Minor Planet Center on 5 July 2007. The provisional designation of 2007 JJ_{43} indicates its discovery date, the first letter represents the first half of May and the second letter and numbers (43) mean that it is the 1085th object discovered during that half-month. (Note: The second letter 'J' indicates that it is the 10th object discovered on the 44th cycle of discoveries. Each completed cycle consists of 25 letters representing discoveries, hence 10 + (43 completed cycles × 25 letters) = 1085.) 2007 JJ_{43} was the minor planet number 278361 by the IAU. As of 2026, 2007 JJ_{43} has not been officially given any name by the International Astronomical Union.

== Orbit and classification ==
=== Orbital characteristics ===
2007 JJ_{43} orbits the Sun at a distance of 40.4–56.3 AU with an semi-major axis or average orbital distance of 48.3 AU once every 335.9 years (for reference, Neptune's orbit is at 30 AU). Its orbit has a relatively high eccentricity of 0.164 and an inclination of 12.04° with respect to the ecliptic. As of 2026, it is about 40.5 AU from the Sun.

=== Occultations ===
2007 JJ_{43} was observed in occultation on 11 July 2019, 7 August 2019, 24 May 2020, and 1 July 2023, with the first three having only one observation, and the last one having three. Another occultation happened on 24 August 2023.

=== Classification ===
2007 JJ_{43} is located in the classical region of the Kuiper belt 39–48 AU from the Sun, and is thus classified as a typical member of a classical Kuiper belt object (also known as a "cubewano"). This classical population is mostly concentrated in a range between 42 and 47 AU. The high orbital inclination of 2007 JJ_{43} makes it a dynamically "hot" member of the classical Kuiper belt, separating it from the "cold" classical Kuiper Belt objects that have inclinations under 5°. The hot classical Kuiper belt objects are believed to have been scattered by the gravitational influence of Neptune into their dynamically excited orbital paths during the Solar System's early history. However, a 2015 study found that 2007 JJ_{43} is likely in a 2:1 resonance with Neptune.

== Physical characteristics ==
=== Size, mass, and density ===
2007 JJ_{43} using its 610 kilometre diametre, compared to the asteroid 4 Vesta, with their size and true color.

According to the SOSB website, stellar occultations using only 1 bands observed from: Brazil and Switzerland on 2019 July 11; Australia on 2019 August 7; Australia on 2020 May 24. Shows that it has equatorial diameters of: >126 km, >220.5 km and >278.8±17 km, respectively. However, a paper released in the 4 of July, 2024, using a program called "occ_find" shows an occultation that reveals a diameter of 444.7 ± 2.4 kilometres (276.3 ± 1.5 mi).

Assuming it has a typical cluster average geometric albedo, this would make it roughly the same size as Ixion (about 697 km diameter). In a 2015 paper in the Astrophysical Journal Letters, András Pál and colleagues estimate a diameter of 2007 JJ_{43} of 610+170
−140 km. A following study in 2021 further refined its diameter down to 504±105 km, assuming a median geometric albedo, making it very similar in size to Saturn's moon Enceladus (504.2 km in diameter). 2007 JJ_{43} is not known to have any natural satellites or moons, which means there is currently no way to measure its mass and density, thus, its mass and density are unknown as of 2026.

The large size of it makes it a possible dwarf planet. However, based on its size of 444.7±2.4 km, it belongs to the class of "mid-sized" TNOs between 400 and 1,000 km (250 and 620 mi) in diameter which scientists proposed in 2019. These mid-sized TNOs are believed to represent the transition between small, low-density TNOs and large, high-density dwarf planets. In a 2019 study, William M. Grundy and his team have hypothesized that mid-sized TNOs in the lower range of 400–1000 km may have highly porous and unheated interiors, because TNOs in the lower range of this zone (such as Uni and Gǃkúnǁʼhòmdímà) have been found to have low densities around 1 g/cm^{3}.

=== Surface and spectra ===
==== Composition and spectrum ====
A paper released on 28 June 2015 by Gourgeot et al. using the instrument X-Shooter at the Paranal Observatory, covering 300 to 2480 nm shows that 2007 JJ_{43}‘s spectra is mostly flat. and can be considered to be a blue-red object. They detected no absorption bands of icy elements, and their models show crystalline water ice is likely does not have a high concentration on the surface of 2007 JJ_{43}, with no more than a concentration of 6.5%. They also proposed a surface composition of 50% complex organics. Observations covering about one-third of the entire surface of 2007 JJ_{43} show no differences, showing its surface is mostly homogeneous. A following 2021 study measured a surface composition of 40%±30% H_{2}O (water), 40%±20% silicates, and 20%±10% organics.

==== Color and albedo ====
2007 JJ_{43} has color indices of: B-V of 1.020±0.028, V-R of 0.590±0.020, and R-I of 0.500±0.020. A later study led by Susan D. Benecchi and Scott S. Sheppard shows that it has color indices of: g'-r' of 0.77±0.03, g'-i' of 1.12±0.04, and r'-i' of 0.35±0.04. A earlier paper by only Scott S. Sheppard in 2010, shows that 2007 JJ_{43} has color indices of: g-r of 0.81±0.02, a g-i of 1.11±0.02, a r-i of 0.29±0.02, a B-R of 1.61±0.02, a V-R of 0.59±0.02, a R-I of 0.50±0.02, and a B-I of 2.12±0.02. András Pál and colleagues assumed a cluster average geometric albedo of 0.13+0.09
−0.07 for 2007 JJ_{43}. A 2021 study by Fernández Valenzuela refined its albedo to 0.11±0.09 by assuming the median albedos of their samples. Johnston’s archive derives an geometric albedo of <0.36 using a diameter of >278.8 km, however in his "List of known trans-Neptunian objects and Centaurs" page, he estimates an albedo of 0.079.

=== Rotation ===
2007 JJ_{43} rotates on its axis once every 12.1 hours, with a light curve amplitude of approximately 0.10, indicating an approximate spheroidal shape.

=== Lack of moons ===
Observations by Mike Brown in 2012, using the W. M. Keck Observatory, suggest that 2007 JJ_{43} does not have a significantly sized companion.

== See also ==
- List of Solar System objects by size
- List of trans-Neptunian objects
- List of minor planets: 278001–279000
