= (303775) 2005 QU182 =

Large scattered-disc object

(303775) 2005 QU_{182}
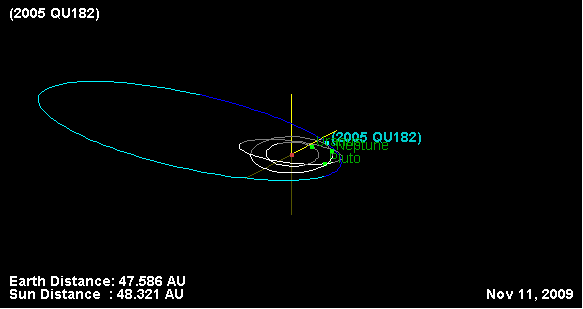
- (303775) 2005 QU_{182}'s orbit

Discovery
- Discovered by: M. E. Brown; D. L. Rabinowitz; C. A. Trujillo
- Discovery site: Palomar Obs.
- Discovery date: 30 August 2005

Designations
- Minor planet category: TNO; SDO

Orbital characteristics(barycentric) (Note: These orbital elements are expressed in terms of the Solar System Barycenter (SSB) as the frame of reference. Due to planetary perturbations, the Sun revolves around the SSB at non-negligible distances, so heliocentric-frame orbital elements and distances (such as those given in JPL's Small-Body Database) can vary on short timescales.)
- Epoch 09 June 2026 (JD 2461200.5)
- Uncertainty parameter 1
- Observation arc: 18,818 days (51.52 yr)
- Aphelion: 189.12 AU (28.292 Tm) (Q)
- Perihelion: 36.817 AU (5.5077 Tm) (q)
- Semi-major axis: 112.97 AU (16.900 Tm) (a)
- Eccentricity: 0.6741 (e)
- Orbital period (sidereal): 1200.7 yr (438,600 d)
- Mean anomaly: 16.7° (M)
- Mean motion: 0° 0^{m} 3.006^{s} / day (n)
- Inclination: 14.048° (i)
- Longitude of ascending node: 78.27° (Ω)
- Argument of perihelion: 224.06° (ω)
- Known satellites: 0
- Earth MOID: 36.015 AU (5.3878 Tm)
- Jupiter MOID: 31.959 AU (4.7810 Tm)
- T_{Jupiter}: 6.732

Physical characteristics
- Mean diameter: 584+155 −144 km 976.31 km 416±73 km
- Mass: 5.256×10^{19} kg (assumed)
- Synodic rotation period: 9.61 h (0.400 d)
- Sidereal rotation period: 9.61 hr
- Geometric albedo: 0.129+0.115 −0.046; 0.3227±0.1133
- Temperature: 45 K (perihelion)
- Spectral type: CO_{2}-type ("double-dip"); B–V = 0.94±0.03; V–R = 0.54±0.03; R–I = 0.51±0.03; 16 ± 2%/100 nm
- Apparent magnitude: 20.9
- Absolute magnitude (H): 3.99±0.02; 3.75±0.01

(303775) 2005 QU_{182} is a large trans-Neptunian object in the scattered disc. It was discovered on 30 August 2005 by American astronomers Mike Brown, David Rabinowitz and Chad Trujillo at the Palomar Observatory in California, with precovery images going back to 1974. It was assigned its permanent number in 2014.

Its diameter is approximately 584+155
−144 km, which makes it among the top 34 largest known trans-Neptunian objects. Its surface shows medium reddening and a composition rich in carbon dioxide ice. 2005 QU_{182} completes one rotation every 9.61 hours. Simulations show that its orbit is unstable over a one-billion-year timeframe because of Neptune's gravity.

The Hubble Space Telescope is scheduled to observe the object in 2026 to search for potential moons. If a moon is discovered, it could allow a direct measurement of its mass and density.

== History ==
=== Discovery ===
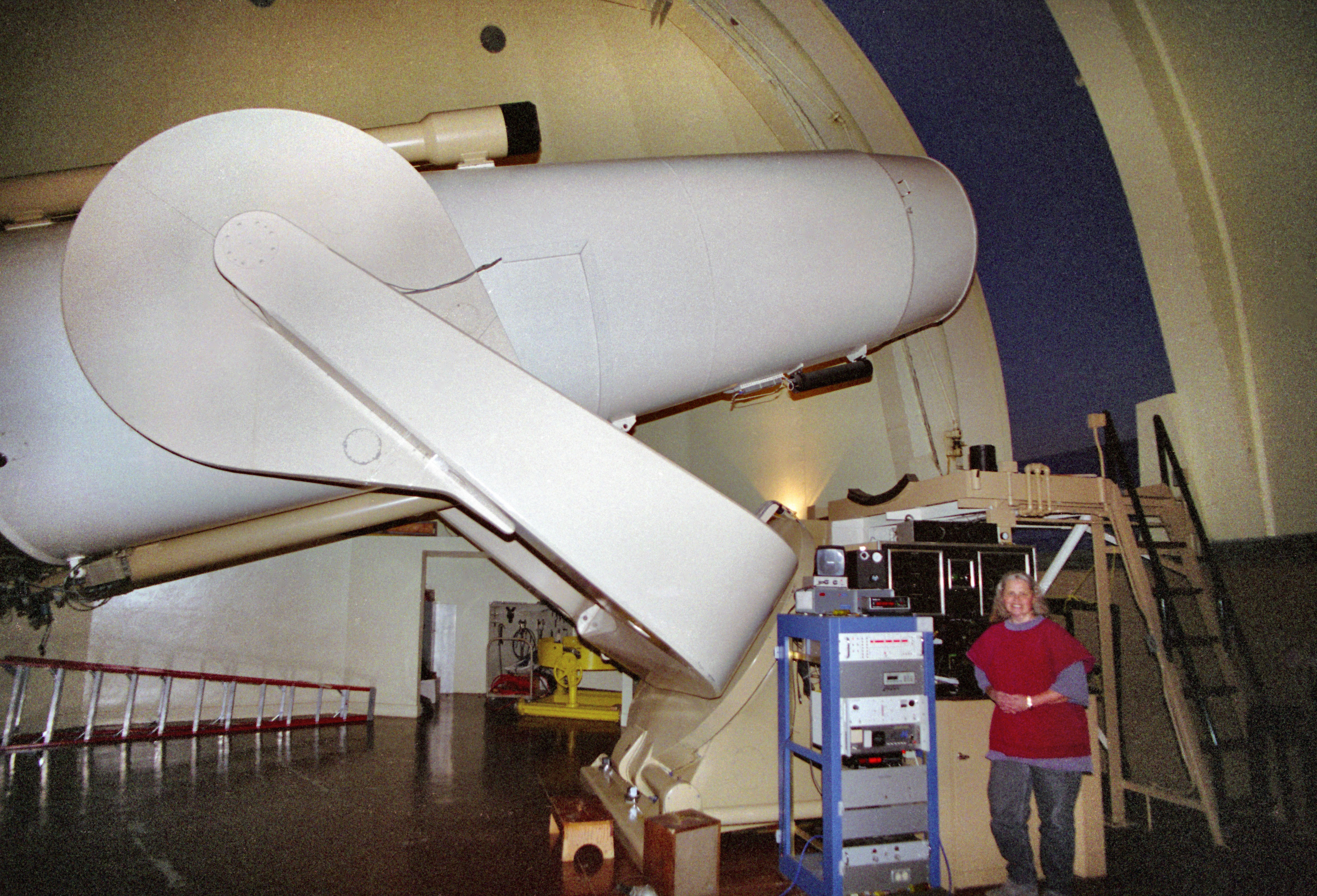
The 1.2-meter Samuel Oschin telescope that was used to discover 2005 QU_{182} at Palomar Observatory

2005 QU_{182} was discovered on 30 August 2005 by American astronomers Mike Brown, David Rabinowitz and Chad Trujillo at the Palomar Observatory (Note: The discoverer is labeled "Palomar" by the MPC.) in California, United States. At the time, they were searching for distant trans-Neptunian objects using the observatory's 1.2-meter Samuel Oschin telescope. As of 2026, it has been observed 626 times over 52 years, with precovery images back to 1974.

=== Further observations ===
Following its discovery, 2005 QU_{182} was tracked by multiple stations, including the Cerro Tololo Observatory, Las Campanas Observatory, and Mauna Kea Observatory. As of 2026, the object has been observed 626 times over an observation arc of 52 years. 2005 QU_{182} is scheduled for observation with the Hubble Space Telescope in 2026, if those observations discover a moon, they could lead to a measurement of the mass and density of 2005 QU_{182}.

=== Provisional designation and numbering ===
The object was formally given the provisional designation 2005 QU_{182} by the Minor Planet Center on 1 September 2007. The provisional designation of 2005 QU_{182} indicates its discovery date, the first letter represents the second half of August and the second letter and numbers means that it is the 4571st object discovered during that half-month. (Note: The second letter 'U' indicates that it is the 21th object discovered on the 183th cycle of discoveries. Each completed cycle consists of 25 letters representing discoveries, hence 21 + (182 completed cycles × 25 letters) = 4571.) 2005 QU_{182} was assigned its permanent number 303775 in 2014.

== Orbit and classification ==
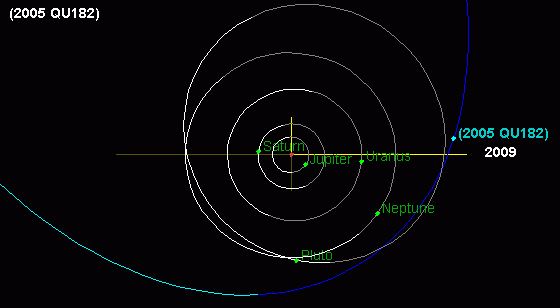
2005 QU_{182} takes around 1,200 years to orbit the Sun. Among large TNOs, only Sedna, 2012 VP113, 2013 FS28, (445473) 2010 VZ98 and 2023 KQ14 have a longer orbit around the Sun.

2005 QU_{182} is a trans-Neptunian object that orbits the Sun at a distance of 36.8–189.1 AU with an semi-major axis or average orbital distance of 113.0 AU once every 1201 years (for reference, Neptune's orbit is at 30 AU). Its orbit has a high eccentricity of 0.674 and an inclination of 14.05° with respect to the ecliptic. 2005 QU_{182} came to perihelion in 1971 and is currently 51.8 AU from the Sun. In April 2013, it moved beyond 50 AU from the Sun.

2005 QU_{182} belongs to the scattered disc, which is a population of TNOs that have distant, inclined, and eccentric orbits that come close to Neptune at perihelion. The scattered disc population, which includes the dwarf planets Eris and Gonggong, are strongly influenced by Neptune's gravitational perturbations and consequently experience gravitational scattering. Both the Minor Planet Center (MPC) and Buie classify that 2005 QU_{182} is a scattered disc object.

=== Orbital stability ===
In a 2021 study, scientists analyzed the orbital stability of 2005 QU_{182} over a period of one billion years. At first, those models predicted that its orbit will be very stable, calculating a diffusion time of 68.272 billion years. However, a full 1 billion year simulation showed that the orbit is unstable, due to the object eventually entering the direct influence of Neptune's gravitational influence. In the simulations, none of its tracks managed to stay near its original orbit size. Even though its orbit size changes dramatically, none of the simulation tracks were completely lost or kicked out of the Solar System.

== Physical characteristics ==
=== Size, mass and density ===
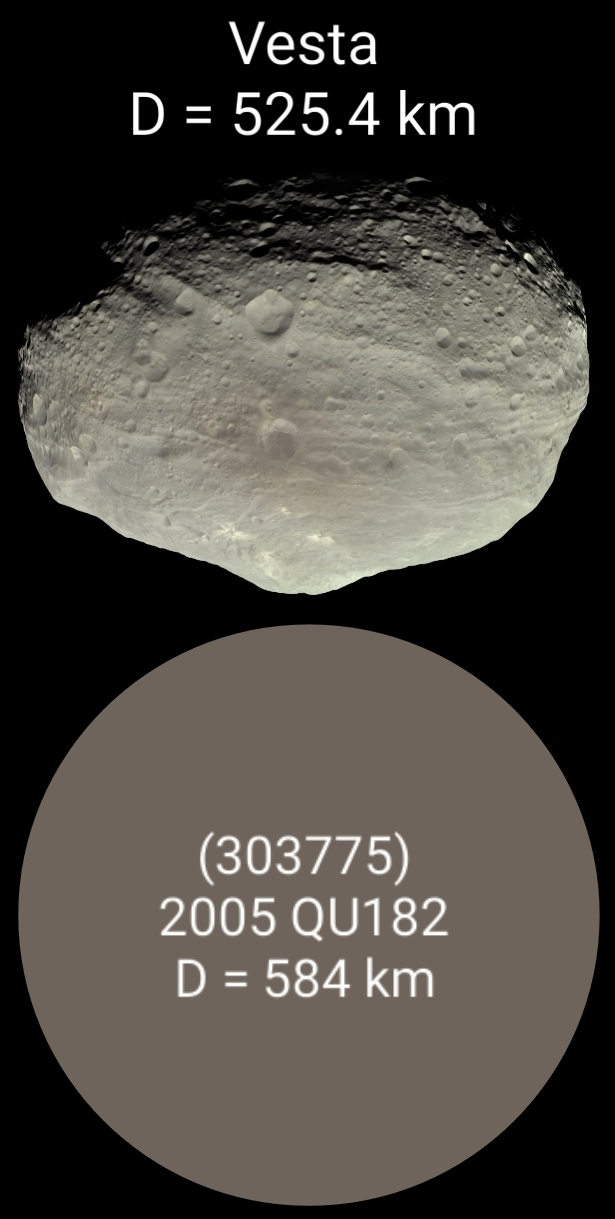
Second largest main belt asteroid 4 Vesta and 2005 QU_{182} size and color comparison

In 2012, the diameter of 2005 QU_{182} was initially estimated to be 416±73 km using data from the Herschel Space Telescope. Later in 2020, the data was reanalyzed, which yielded a notably larger nominal diameter and uncertainty of 584+155
−144 km, making it approximately ¹/_{4} the size of the dwarf planet Eris. (Note: Eris has a radius of 1,163 km (723 mi), which translates to a diameter of 2,326 km (1,445 mi). ¹/_{4} of Eris's diameter is 581.5 km (361.3 mi), which is roughly around 2005 QU_{182}'s size of 584+155 −144 km.) 2005 QU_{182} is a relatively large trans-Neptunian object and is among the top 34 largest known TNOs. 2005 QU_{182} is not known to have any natural satellites or moons, which means there is currently no way to measure its mass and density. A 2021 study by Munoz-Gutierrez assumed a mass of 5.256×10^{19} kg for 2005 QU_{182}. However, the true mass still remains unknown currently.

2005 QU_{182}'s size is large enough that Mike Brown classify it as a possible dwarf planet, putting it in the 'probably' zone. However, based on its size of approximately 440–740 km, it belongs to the proposed class of "mid-sized" TNOs between 400 and 1,000 km (250 and 620 mi) in diameter, which are believed to represent the transition between small, low-density TNOs and large, high-density dwarf planets. In a 2019 study, William M. Grundy and his team have hypothesized that mid-sized TNOs should have highly porous and unheated interiors, because TNOs in this size range (such as Uni and Gǃkúnǁʼhòmdímà) have been found to have low densities around 1 g/cm^{3}.

=== Surface ===
==== Composition and spectrum ====
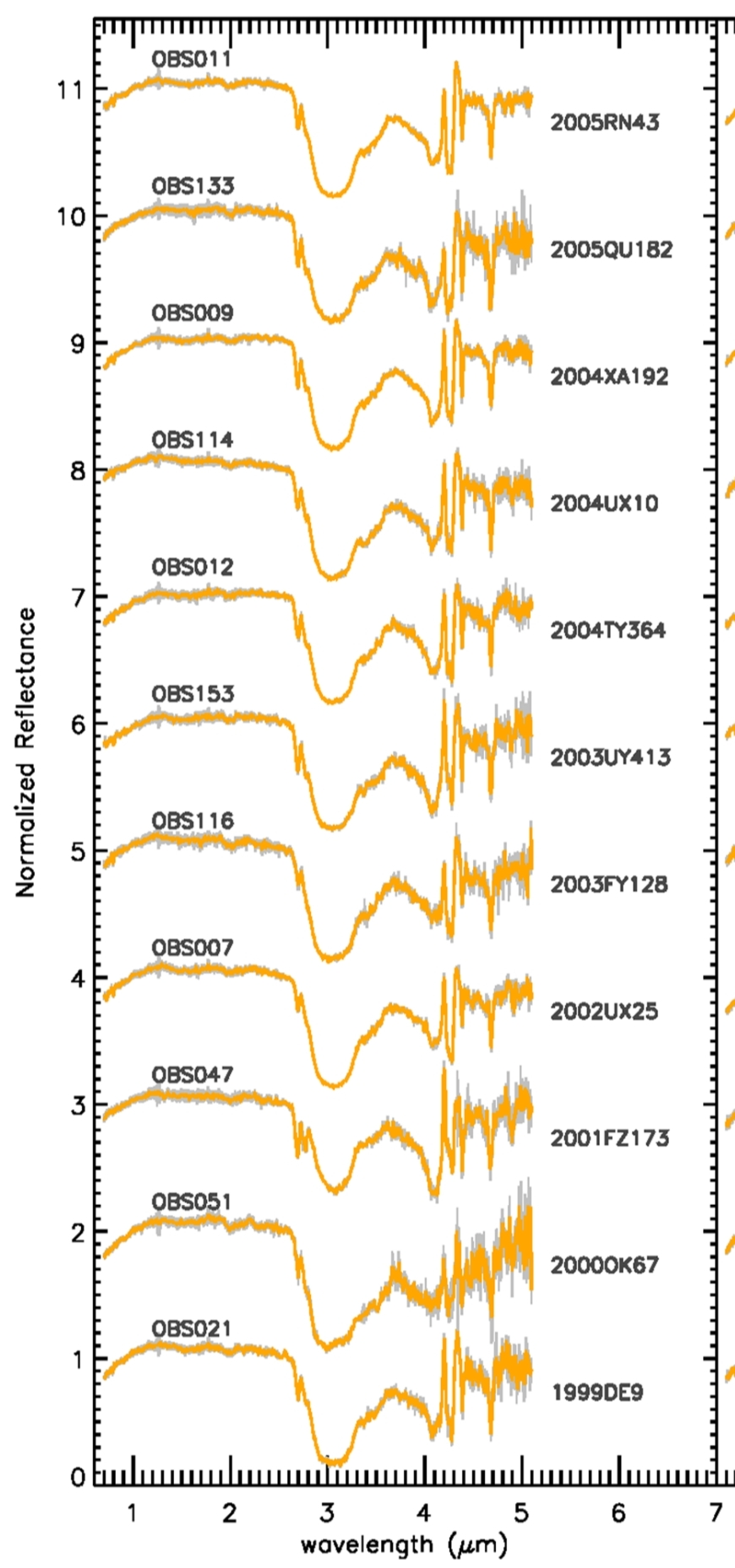
Spectrum of 11 double dip (CO2) type large trans-Neptunian objects. 2005 QU_{182} is the second from the top.

2005 QU_{182} shares its composition with the CO_{2}-type (aka "double-dip") trans-Neptunian objects, which are commonly found on dynamically excited orbits such as those in the hot classical Kuiper belt. (Note: The "double-dip" TNO spectral type were later renamed to the "CO_{2}-type" in 2025.) The CO_{2} type TNO exhibits two adjacent absorption minima in the 3 μm region, resulting in the “double dip” feature. Their spectra is dominated by carbon dioxide ices,carbon monoxide ices, and isotopologue ices, with other irradiation products like light hydrocarbons. The CO_{2}-type TNOs like 2005 QU_{182} is the most common spectral type in the DiSco sample.

==== Color, albedo and surface temperature ====
2005 QU_{182} has color indices of: B–V 0.94 ± 0.03; V–R 0.54 ± 0.03; R–I 0.51 ± 0.03. It also has a known spectral slope of 16 ± 2%/100 nm, indicating a surface with medium reddening. Observations by the Herschel Space Telescope show that it has a geometric albedo of 0.129+0.115
−0.046. The surface temperature of 2005 QU_{182} at perihelion (closest point to the Sun) is estimated to be approximately 45 Kelvin.

==== Brightness and visibility ====
2005 QU_{182} has a bright absolute magnitude of 3.74. According to the Minor Planet Center, it is the seventh intrinsically brightest scattered-disc object. However, due to its very far distance from Earth, it has a dim apparent magnitude of 20.9 when viewed from Earth.

=== Rotation ===
According to a 2013 photometric survey, 2005 QU_{182} has a rotation period of 9.61 hours, with its brightness varying by 0.12 magnitudes during each rotation, indicating an approximate spherical shape.

== Origin ==
As a scattered-disc object, 2005 QU_{182} is believed to have formed from a primordial disk of icy planetesimals surrounding the young Sun. During the early evolution of the Solar System, gravitational interactions with Neptune scattered the object into its current highly eccentric orbit.

== Exploration concepts ==
2005 QU_{182} has not been visited by any spacecraft. A 2019 study on flyby mission opportunities between 2025 and 2040 calculated hypothetical trajectories to 2005 QU_{182} using gravity assists from Jupiter, Saturn, and Neptune. These trajectories make launch windows between 2025 and 2033, with travel times ranging from 15.7 to 24.5 years. Two specific trajectories using swingbys of both Jupiter and Neptune have launch windows in April 2032, with arrival dates at 2005 QU_{182} in 2048 and 2050.

== See also ==
- List of trans-Neptunian objects
- List of minor planets: 303001–304000
- List of possible dwarf planets
- Scattered disc
