= List of possible dwarf planets =

Comparison of sizes, albedos, and colors of various large trans-Neptunian objects with diameters greater than 700 km (430 mi). The light and dark colored arcs represent uncertainties of the object's size.

The number of dwarf planets in the Solar System is unknown. Estimates have run as high as 200 in the Kuiper belt and over 10,000 in the region beyond. However, consideration of the surprisingly low densities and albedos of many large trans-Neptunian objects, as well as spectroscopic analysis of their surfaces, suggests that the number of dwarf planets may be much lower, perhaps only nine among bodies known so far. The International Astronomical Union (IAU) defines dwarf planets as being in hydrostatic equilibrium, and notes six bodies in particular: Ceres in the inner Solar System and five in the trans-Neptunian region: Pluto, Eris, Haumea, Makemake, and Quaoar. Only Pluto and Ceres have been confirmed to be in hydrostatic equilibrium, due to the results of the New Horizons and Dawn missions. Eris is generally assumed to be a dwarf planet because it is similar in size to Pluto and even more massive. Haumea and Makemake were accepted as dwarf planets by the IAU for naming purposes and will keep their names if it turns out they are not dwarf planets. Smaller trans-Neptunian objects have been called dwarf planets if they appear to be solid bodies, which is a prerequisite for hydrostatic equilibrium: planetologists generally include at least Gonggong, Orcus, and Sedna. Quaoar was labelled as a dwarf planet in a 2022–2023 annual report, though it does not appear to be in hydrostatic equilibrium. In practice the requirement for hydrostatic equilibrium is often loosened to include all gravitationally rounded objects, even by the IAU, as otherwise Mercury would not be a planet.

== Limiting values ==
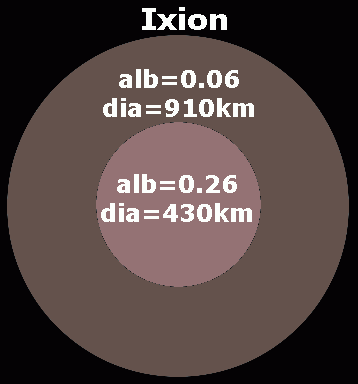
Calculation of the diameter of Ixion depends on the albedo (the fraction of light that it reflects). Current estimates are that the albedo is 11%, a bit under the midpoint of the range shown here and corresponding to a diameter of 700 km.

Beside directly orbiting the Sun, the qualifying feature of a dwarf planet is that it have "sufficient mass for its self-gravity to overcome rigid-body forces so that it assumes a hydrostatic equilibrium (nearly round) shape". Current observations are generally insufficient for a direct determination as to whether a body meets this definition. Often the only clues for trans-Neptunian objects (TNO) is a crude estimate of their diameters and albedos. Icy satellites as large as 1,500 km in diameter have proven to not be in equilibrium, whereas dark objects in the outer solar system often have low densities that imply they are not even solid bodies, much less gravitationally controlled dwarf planets.

Ceres, which has a significant amount of ice in its composition, is the only accepted dwarf planet in the asteroid belt, though there are unexplained anomalies. 4 Vesta, the second-most-massive asteroid and one that is basaltic in composition, appears to have a fully differentiated interior and was therefore in equilibrium at some point in its history, but no longer is today. The third-most massive object, 2 Pallas, has a somewhat irregular surface and is thought to have only a partially differentiated interior; it is also less icy than Ceres. Michael Brown has estimated that, because rocky objects such as Vesta are more rigid than icy objects, rocky objects below 900 kilometres (560 mi) in diameter may not be in hydrostatic equilibrium and thus not dwarf planets. The two largest icy outer-belt asteroids 10 Hygiea and 704 Interamnia are close to equilibrium, but in Hygiea's case this may be a result of its disruption and the re-aggregation of its fragments, while Interamnia is now somewhat away from equilibrium due to impacts.

Based on a comparison with the icy moons that have been visited by spacecraft, such as Mimas (round at 400 km in diameter) and Proteus (irregular at 420 km in diameter), Brown estimated that an icy body relaxes into hydrostatic equilibrium at a diameter somewhere between 200 and 400 km. However, after Brown and Tancredi made their calculations, better determination of their shapes showed that Mimas and the other mid-sized ellipsoidal moons of Saturn up to at least Iapetus (which, at 1,471 km in diameter, is approximately the same size as Haumea and Makemake) are no longer in hydrostatic equilibrium; they are also icier than TNOs are likely to be. They have equilibrium shapes that froze in place some time ago, and do not match the shapes that equilibrium bodies would have at their current rotation rates. Thus Rhea, at 1528 km in diameter, is the smallest body for which gravitational measurements are consistent with current hydrostatic equilibrium. Ceres, at 950 km in diameter, is close to equilibrium, but some deviations from equilibrium shape remain unexplained. Much larger objects, such as Earth's moon and the planet Mercury, are not near hydrostatic equilibrium today, though the Moon is composed primarily of silicate rock and Mercury of metal (in contrast to most dwarf planet candidates, which are ice and rock). Saturn's moons may have been subject to a thermal history that would have produced equilibrium-like shapes in bodies too small for gravity alone to do so. Thus, at present it is unknown whether any trans-Neptunian objects smaller than Pluto and Eris are in hydrostatic equilibrium. Nonetheless, it does not matter in practice, because the precise statement of hydrostatic equilibrium in the definition is universally ignored in favour of roundness and solidity.

The majority of mid-sized TNOs up to about 900–1000 km in diameter have significantly lower densities (~ 1.0–1.2 g/ml) than larger bodies such as Pluto (1.86 g/cm^{3}). Brown had speculated that this was due to their composition, that they were almost entirely icy. However, Grundy et al. point out that there is no known mechanism or evolutionary pathway for mid-sized bodies to be icy while both larger and smaller objects are partially rocky. They demonstrated that at the prevailing temperatures of the Kuiper Belt, water ice is strong enough to support open interior spaces (interstices) in objects of this size; they concluded that mid-size TNOs have low densities for the same reason that smaller objects do—because they have not compacted under self-gravity into fully solid objects, and thus the typical TNO smaller than 900–1000 km in diameter is (pending some other formative mechanism) unlikely to be a dwarf planet.

=== Assessment by Tancredi ===
In 2010, Gonzalo Tancredi presented a report to the IAU evaluating a list of 46 trans-Neptunian candidates for dwarf planet status based on light-curve-amplitude analysis and a calculation that the object was more than 450 kilometres (280 mi) in diameter. Some diameters were measured, some were best-fit estimates, and others used an assumed albedo of 0.10 to calculate the diameter. Of these, he identified 15 as dwarf planets by his criteria (including the 4 accepted by the IAU), with another 9 being considered possible. To be cautious, he advised the IAU to "officially" accept as dwarf planets the top three: Sedna, Orcus, and Quaoar. Although the IAU had anticipated Tancredi's recommendations, by late 2023 only Quaoar had been accepted.

=== Assessment by Brown ===
Brown's categories	Min. ⌀	Number of objects
Nearly certain	> 900 km	10
Highly likely	600–900 km	19 (29 total)
Likely	500–600 km	24 (53 total)
Probably	400–500 km	74 (127 total)
Possibly	200–400 km	1,301 (1,428 total)
Source: Mike Brown, as of November 10, 2026

Mike Brown considers 127 trans-Neptunian bodies to be "probably" dwarf planets, ranked them by estimated size. He does not consider asteroids, stating "in the asteroid belt Ceres, with a diameter of 900 km, is the only object large enough to be round."

The terms for varying degrees of likelihood he split these into:

- Near certainty: diameter estimated/measured to be over 900 kilometres (560 mi). Sufficient confidence to say these must be in hydrostatic equilibrium, even if predominantly rocky. 10 objects as of 2026.
- Highly likely: diameter estimated/measured to be over 600 kilometres (370 mi). The size would have to be "grossly in error" or they would have to be primarily rocky to not be dwarf planets. 19 objects as of 2026.
- Likely: diameter estimated/measured to be over 500 kilometres (310 mi). Uncertainties in measurement mean that some of these will be significantly smaller and thus doubtful. 24 objects as of 2026.
- Probably: diameter estimated/measured to be over 400 kilometres (250 mi). Expected to be dwarf planets, if they are icy, and that figure is correct. 74 objects as of 2026.
- Possibly: diameter estimated/measured to be over 200 kilometres (120 mi). Icy moons transition from a round to irregular shape in the 200–400 km range, suggesting that the same figure holds true for KBOs. Thus, some of these objects could be dwarf planets. 1,301 objects as of 2026.
- Probably not: diameter estimated/measured to be under 200 km. No icy moon under 200 km is round, and the same may be true of KBOs. The estimated size of these objects would have to be in error for them to be dwarf planets.

Beside the five older accepted by the IAU plus Quaoar, the 'nearly certain' category includes Gonggong, Sedna, 2026 ED138, Salacia, and Orcus. 2026 ED_{138}'s diameter is unknown; Brown uses the MPC's absolute magnitude estimate of 2.9 and an assumed albedo of 0.14. Analysis from Rubin Observatory, DECam, and OGLE show its absolute magnitude at 3.1–3.2.

=== Assessment by Grundy et al. ===
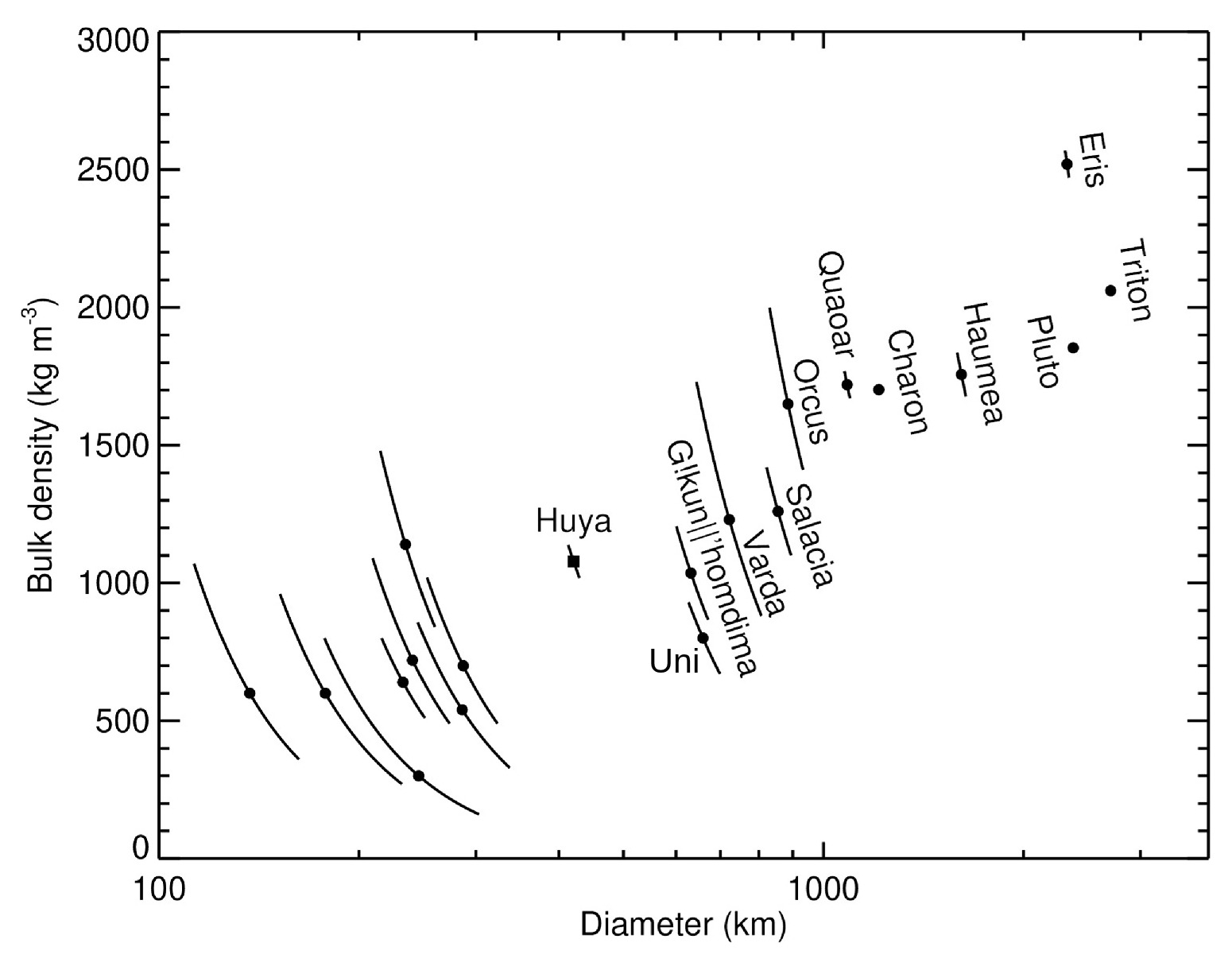
TNO densities (vertical axis) plotted by increasing diameter (horizontal axis). As the diameter of TNOs increase, their density increases as well. Salacia's density is now thought to be higher, closer to that of Orcus.

Grundy et al. propose that dark, low-density TNOs in the size range of approximately 400–1000 km are transitional between smaller, porous (and thus low-density) bodies and larger, denser, brighter, and geologically differentiated planetary bodies (such as dwarf planets). Bodies in this size range should have begun to collapse the interstitial spaces left over from their formation, but not fully, leaving some residual porosity.

Many TNOs in the size range of about 400–1000 km have oddly low densities, in the range of about 1.0–1.2 g/cm^{3}, that are substantially less than those of dwarf planets such as Pluto, Eris and Ceres, which have densities closer to 2. Brown has suggested that large low-density bodies must be composed almost entirely of water ice since he presumed that bodies of this size would necessarily be solid. However, this leaves unexplained why TNOs both larger than 1,000 km and smaller than 400 km, and indeed comets, are composed of a substantial fraction of rock, leaving only this size range to be primarily icy. Experiments with water ice at the relevant pressures and temperatures suggest that substantial porosity could remain in this size range, and it is possible that adding rock to the mix would further increase resistance to collapsing into a solid body. Bodies with internal porosity remaining from their formation could be at best only partially differentiated, in their deep interiors (if a body had begun to collapse into a solid body, there should be evidence in the form of fault systems from when its surface contracted). The higher albedos of larger bodies are also evidence of full differentiation, as such bodies were presumably resurfaced with ice from their interiors. Grundy et al. propose therefore that mid-size, low-density and low-albedo bodies such as Salacia, Varda, Gǃkúnǁʼhòmdímà, and Uni are not differentiated planetary bodies like Orcus, Quaoar, and Charon. The boundary between the two populations would appear to be in the range of about 900–1000 km, although Grundy et al. also suggest that 600–700 km might constitute an upper limit to retaining significant porosity.

If Grundy et al. are correct, then very few known bodies in the outer Solar System are likely to have compacted into fully solid bodies, and thus to possibly have become dwarf planets at some point in their past or to still be dwarf planets at present. Pluto–Charon, Eris, Haumea, Gonggong, Makemake, Quaoar, and Sedna are either known (Pluto) or strong candidates (the others). Orcus is again just above the threshold by size, though it is bright.

There are a number of smaller bodies, estimated to be between 700 and 900 km in diameter, for most of which not enough is known to apply these criteria. All of them are dark, mostly with albedos under 0.11, with brighter Chiminigagua (0.18) an exception; this suggests that they are not dwarf planets. However, Salacia and Varda may be dense enough to at least be solid. If Salacia were spherical and had the same albedo as its moon, it would have a density of between 1.4 and 1.6 g/cm^{3}, calculated a few months after Grundy et al.'s initial assessment, though still an albedo of only 0.04. Varda might have a higher density of 1.78±0.06 g/cm^{3} (a lower density of 1.23±0.04 g/cm^{3} was considered possible though less probable), published the year after Grundy et al.'s initial assessment; its albedo of 0.10 is close to Quaoar's.

=== Assessment by Emery et al. ===
In 2023, Emery et al. wrote that near-infrared spectroscopy by the James Webb Space Telescope (JWST) in 2022 suggests that Sedna, Gonggong and Quaoar internally melted and differentiated and are chemically evolved, like the larger dwarf planets Pluto, Eris, Haumea, and Makemake, but unlike smaller KBOs that were included in a parallel publication. This is because light hydrocarbons are present on their surfaces (e.g., ethane, acetylene, and ethylene), which implies that methane is continuously being resupplied, and that methane would likely come from internal geochemistry. On the other hand, the surfaces of Sedna, Gonggong and Quaoar have low abundances of CO and CO_{2}, similar to Pluto, Eris and Makemake but in contrast to smaller bodies. This suggests that the threshold for dwarf planethood in the trans-Neptunian region is a diameter of ≈1000 km (thus including Pluto, Eris, Haumea, Makemake, Gonggong, Quaoar and possibly Sedna; Orcus was not addressed).

== Likeliest dwarf planets ==
The acceptance criteria of the IAU are for naming purposes and are not a formal evaluation that a body is or is not a dwarf planet. In addition to Ceres and the four largest TNOs, which have been repeatedly characterized as dwarf planets by the IAU, Quaoar was called a dwarf planet in a 2022–2023 IAU annual report. An IAU question-and-answer press release from 2006 was more specific: it estimated that objects with mass above 5×10^{20} kg and diameter greater than 800 km (800 km across) would "normally" be in hydrostatic equilibrium ("the shape ... would normally be determined by self-gravity"), but that "all borderline cases would need to be determined by observation." This is close to Grundy et al.'s suggestion below for the approximate physical limit. Those suggestions are specifically for the extremely cold trans-Neptunian regions. The inner Solar System is warmer, so the limits may be different, but here there are few possibilities for additional dwarf planets.

=== Largest measured candidates ===
The following trans-Neptunian objects have measured diameters at least 600 kilometres (370 mi) to within measurement uncertainties; this was the threshold to be considered a "highly likely" dwarf planet in Brown's early assessment. Grundy et al. speculated that 600 km to 700 km diameter could represent "the upper limit to retain substantial internal pore space", and that objects around 900 km could have collapsed interiors but fail to completely differentiate.

The two satellites of TNOs that surpass the 600-km threshold have also been included: Pluto's moon Charon and Eris' moon Dysnomia. Charon has been called a (binary) dwarf planet itself. The next-largest TNO moon is Orcus' moon Vanth at 442.5±10.2 km and a poorly constrained mass of (87±8)×10^{18} kg, with an albedo of about 8%.

Ceres, generally accepted as a dwarf planet, is added for comparison. Also added for comparison is Triton, which is thought to have been a dwarf planet in the Kuiper belt before it was captured by Neptune.

Bodies with very poorly known sizes (e.g. 2018 VG18 "Farout") have been gathered in the following section. Complicating the situation for poorly known bodies is that a body assumed to be a large single object might turn out to be a binary or ternary system of smaller objects, as Chiminigagua and Lempo turned out to be. A 2021 occultation of 2004 XR_{190} ("Buffy") found a chord of 560 km: if the body is approximately spherical, it is likely that the diameter is greater than 560 km, but if it is elongated, the volumetric diameter may well be less. Explanations and sources for the measured masses and diameters can be found in the corresponding articles linked in column "Designation" of the table.

- Bodies with a nominal estimated volumetric diameter over 900 km are bolded; they have general consensus as being dwarfs, per the previous section. Charon is also bolded, as it has sometimes been considered a possible dwarf in its own right; Triton is bolded as a former KBO that is still rounded and geologically active.
- Bodies with estimated diameter between 700 km and 900 km are in bold italic; most are borderline possibilities, but in most cases are too poorly known for much certainty. They tend to be dark, suggesting that they are not dwarf planets, but some might be dense enough to be fully solid bodies.
- Other bodies, having estimated diameters below 400 km, are unlikely to be dwarf planets on the basis of current evaluation, but may be transitional (partially compressed) bodies.
- A light-grey background indicates objects whose densities are believed to be higher than 1.5 g/cm^{3}. Orcus and Sedna are on a medium-grey background due to uncertainties.
- Darkest of the three shades of grey indicates those bodies whose densities are believed to be lower than 1.5 g/cm^{3}, and so if the data is correct cannot be dwarf planets.
- Satellites are on a pink background, as under the current definition a dwarf planet must directly orbit the Sun.

All of these categories are subject to change with further evidence.

Possible dwarf planets with measured sizes or masses (satellites Triton, Charon, Dysnomia included for comparison)
Designation	Provisional designation	H (Note: "List Of Trans-Neptunian Objects". Minor Planet Center. Retrieved 15 July 2023.) (Note: "List Of Centaurs and Scattered-Disk Objects". Minor Planet Center. Retrieved 15 July 2023.)	Geometric albedo (Note: The geometric albedo $A$ is calculated from the measured absolute magnitude $H$ and measured diameter $D$ via the formula: $A =\left ( \frac{1329\times10^{-H/5}}{D} \right ) ^2$. Ranges have been given for Triton, Pluto, and Charon, which have been observed up close and therefore have known local albedo variations.)	Diameter (km)	Method	Mass (Note: This is the total system mass (including moons), except for Pluto, Haumea, and Orcus.) (10^{18} kg)	Density (g/cm^{3})	Moons	Category	Semi-Major Axis	ID'd as a dwarf		
Designation	Provisional designation	H	Geometric albedo	Diameter (km)	Method	Mass (10^{18} kg)	Density (g/cm^{3})	Moons	Category	Semi-Major Axis	Emery et al.	Grundy et al.	Johnston's Archive
**Neptune I Triton**	N/A	−1.2	60% to 95%	2707±2	direct	21389±28	2.061		satellite of Neptune				
**134340 Pluto**	N/A	−0.45	49% to 66%	2377±3	direct	13025±6	1.854±0.006	5	2:3 resonant	39.482 AU	Yes		Yes
**136199 Eris**	2003 UB_{313}	−1.21	96%	2326±12	occultation	16466±85	2.43±0.05	1	SDO	67.69 AU	Yes		Yes
**136108 Haumea**	2003 EL_{61}	0.21	49%	1544+40 −38	occultation	3952.44+11.09 −11.03	2.050+0.157 −0.152	2	classical	43.116 AU	Yes		Yes
**136472 Makemake**	2005 FY_{9}	−0.21	83%	1430±14	occultation	2690±200	1.76±0.17	1	classical	45.499 AU	Yes		Yes
**225088 Gonggong**	2007 OR_{10}	1.86	14%	1230±50	thermal	1750±70	1.74±0.16	1	3:10 resonant	66.895 AU	Yes		Yes
**134340 Pluto I Charon**	S/1978 P 1	1	20% to 50%	1212±1	direct	1589.7±4.5	1.705±0.006		satellite of Pluto				
**50000 Quaoar**	2002 LM_{60}	2.42	11%	1115.7±9.4	occultation	1212±5	1.751±0.013	1 (2?)	classical	43.335 AU	Yes		No
**1 Ceres**	N/A	3.33	9%	939.4±0.2	direct	938.35±0.01	2.16±0.01	0 (Note: Dawn is an artificial satellite of Ceres)	asteroid belt	2.77 AU	Yes		Yes
**90482 Orcus**	2004 DW	2.18	23% ± 2%	910+50 −40	thermal	548±10	1.4±0.2	1	2:3 resonant	39.174 AU			No
**90377 Sedna**	2003 VB_{12}	1.52	41%	906+314 −258 (occult. chord 1025±135)	thermal			0	detached	506 AU	Yes		No
**120347 Salacia**	2004 SB_{60}	4.26	5%	838±44	thermal	492±7	1.50±0.12	1	classical	42.184 AU		Maybe	No
**55565 Aya**	2002 AW_{197}	3.59	10%	802+56 −80	occultation			0	classical	47.196 AU			No
**307261 Máni**	2002 MS_{4}	3.62	10%	796±24	occultation			0 (1?)	classical	41.739 AU			No
**208996 Achlys**	2003 AZ_{84}	3.77	11%	772±12	occultation		0.87 (assuming HE)	1	2:3 resonant	39.470 AU		No	No
**532037 Chiminigagua**	2013 FY_{27}	3.12	18%	742+78 −83	thermal	§		1	SDO	58.786 AU			No
**174567 Varda**	2003 MW_{12}	3.81±0.01	9.9%	740±14	occultation	244±6	1.78±0.06? or 1.23±0.04? or 1.726?	1	classical (15:8 resonance?)	45.707 AU	No	Maybe	No
28978 Ixion	2001 KX_{76}	3.85	11%	697+11 −9	occultation			0	2:3 resonant	39.497 AU			No
90568 Goibniu	2004 GV_{9}	3.99	8%	680±34	thermal		1.14–1.49 (assuming a Jacobi ellipsoid)	0	classical	41.945 AU			No
145452 Ritona	2005 RN_{43}	3.882±0.036	11%	679+55 −73	thermal			0	classical	41.512 AU	No		No
55637 Uni	2002 UX_{25}	3.85	12%	659±38	thermal	125±3	0.82±0.11	1	classical	43.003 AU	No	No	No
20000 Varuna	2000 WR_{106}	3.79	12%	654+154 −102	thermal		0.992+0.086 −0.015 (assuming HE)	0 (1?)	classical	42.718 AU		No	No
(455502) 2003 UZ413	2003 UZ_{413}	4.38	7.5%	650	thermal		0.72–2.29 0.72–3.00 (assuming a Jacobi ellipsoid)	0	plutino	39.111 AU			No
145451 Rumina	2005 RM_{43}	4.63	11%	644	occultation			0	SDO	92.41 AU			No
2014 UZ224 ("DeeDee")	2014 UZ_{224}	3.48	14%	635+65 −72	thermal	§		0	SDO	109.93 ± 0.14 AU			No
229762 Gǃkúnǁʼhòmdímà	2007 UK_{126}	3.5	14%	634+10 −8	occultation	136±3	1.04±0.17	1	SDO	74.58 AU	No	No	No
136199 Eris I Dysnomia	S/2005 (2003 UB_{313}) 1	5.6	5±1%	615+60 −50	thermal	<140	0.7±0.5		satellite of Eris				
(612911) 2004 XR190 ("Buffy")	2004 XR_{190}	4.33	9.5±23%(R-band)	600±170	occultation	§		0	SDO	57.464 AU			No
(303775) 2005 QU182	2005 QU_{182}	3.75	13%	584+155 −144	thermal	§		0	SDO	112.97 AU			No
78799 Xewioso	2002 XW_{93}	4.86	4%	565+71 −73	thermal			0	classical	37.68 AU			No

§ Chiminigagua was scheduled for imaging with the Hubble Space Telescope in late 2025 to establish the orbit of its moon, which should lead to an accurate measurement of its mass and density. 2014 UZ_{224} ("DeeDee") and 2005 QU_{182} are scheduled for imaging with the Hubble Space Telescope in 2026, which may discover moons, which in turn could lead to a measurement of their mass and density.

At the right of the table are evaluations by Emery et al. and by Grundy et al. Grundy et al. did not determine which bodies were dwarf planets, but rather which could not be. A red No marks objects that are not dense enough to be solid bodies. Emery et al. suggest that Sedna, Quaoar, and Gonggong went through internal melting, differentiation, and chemical evolution like the larger dwarf planets (green Yes ), but that the smaller KBOs in a parallel paper did not (of which those listed in this table are marked No ). The question of current equilibrium was not addressed; this criterion is not generally taken seriously despite being in the official definition. (Mercury is round but known to be out of equilibrium; it is universally considered as a planet according to the intent of the IAU and geophysical definitions, rather than to the letter.) This would be relevant for Quaoar, as in 2024, Kiss et al. found that Quaoar has an ellipsoidal shape incompatible with hydrostatic equilibrium for its current spin. They hypothesised that Quaoar originally had a rapid rotation and was in hydrostatic equilibrium, but that its shape became "frozen in" and did not change as it spun down due to tidal forces from its moon Weywot. If so, this would resemble the situation of Saturn's moon Iapetus, which is too oblate for its current spin. Iapetus is generally still considered a planetary-mass moon nonetheless, though not always.

=== Brightest unmeasured candidates ===
For objects without a measured size or mass, sizes can only be estimated by assuming an albedo. Most sub-dwarf objects are thought to be dark, because they have not been resurfaced; this means that they are also relatively large for their magnitudes. Below is a table for assumed albedos between 4% (the albedo of Salacia) and 20% (a value above which suggests resurfacing), and the sizes objects of those albedos would need to be (if round) to produce the observed absolute magnitude. Backgrounds are blue for >900 km and teal for >600 km.

Sizes in km calculated from assumed albedos (Note: The diameter can be calculated from the measured absolute magnitude $H$, and for an assumed albedo $p$, via the formula: $D = \frac{1329\times10^{-H/5}}{\sqrt{p}}$) for brightest objects without measured size or mass
H	Objects with this magnitude (H)	Diameter of object at the bright end of this range, for an assumed albedo (p) of:								
H	Objects with this magnitude (H)	4%	6%	8%	10%	12%	14%	16%	18%	20%
3.00–3.09		1,670	1,360	1,180	1,060	960	890	840	790	750
3.10–3.19	2026 ED138 (H = 3.154 ± 0.035)	1,590	1,300	1,130	1,010	920	850	800	750	710
3.20–3.29		1,520	1,240	1,080	963	879	810	760	720	680
3.30–3.39		1,450	1,190	1,030	919	839	780	730	690	650
3.40–3.49		1,390	1,130	980	880	800	740	690	650	620
3.50–3.59	(2021 DR_{15})	1,330	1,080	940	840	770	710	660	630	590
3.60–3.69	^{§}2021 DR15 (H = 3.61 ± 0.15), TESS TNO-2 (Hv = 3.6 ± 0.24) (Note: The object currently has no provisional designation)	1,270	1,030	900	800	730	680	630	600	570
3.70–3.79	^{§}2017 OF201 (H = 3.72 ± 0.09)	1,210	990	860	770	700	650	610	570	540
3.80–3.89	^{§}2010 RF_{43}, 2015 RR_{245}(Leonardo), ^{§}2010 JO_{179}, ^{§}2014 EZ_{51} (> 575 km)	1,160	940	820	730	670	620	580	540	520
3.90–3.99	^{§}2018 VG18 ("Farout"); H = 3.94 ± 0.52), 2026 EE138 (H = 3.95 ± 0.22)	1,100	900	780	700	640	590	550	520	490
4.00–4.09	2010 KZ39, ^{§}2012 VP113 ("Biden"), ^{§}2021 LL37 (H = 4.09 ± 0.31)	1,050	860	750	670	610	560	530	500	470
4.10–4.19	^{§}2015 KH_{162}, 2020 MK53 (lost; H = 4.12 ± 0.35)	1,010	820	710	640	580	540	500	470	450
4.20–4.29	2008 ST_{291}, 2018 AG37 ("FarFarOut"; H = 4.22 ± 0.1), ^{§}2013 FZ_{27}, 2010 RE_{64}	960	780	680	610	560	510	480	450	430
4.30–4.39	^{§}2014 WK_{509}, ^{§}Geyagugv, ^{§}2017 OF_{69}, ^{§}2014 AN_{55}, ^{§}2017 FO161, 2016 NY210 (H = 4.38 ± 0.74)	920	750	650	580	530	490	460	430	410
4.40–4.49	2025 NE552 (H = 4.41 ± 0.22), ^{§}2014 WP_{509}, 2026 GC24, ^{§}2013 XC_{26}, 2007 JJ_{43}, 2014 YA50	880	720	620	550	510	470	440	410	390
4.50–4.59	^{§}2010 FX86, 2010 OO_{127}, 2025 MT387, 2026 BS14	840	680	590	530	480	450	420	390	370
4.60–4.69	2007 XV_{50}, 2006 QH181, 2025 MZ348 (H = 4.64 ± 0.17), 2014 OE_{394}, 2002 WC_{19}, ^{§}2014 HA_{200}, ^{§}2014 US277, ^{§}2010 DN_{93}	800	650	570	510	460	430	400	380	360
4.70–4.79	^{§}2014 BV_{64}, 2014 FC69, ^{§}2015 BZ_{518}, 2014 FC_{72}, 2020 FY30 (H = 4.71 ± 0.16), ^{§}2014 US_{224}, ^{§}2015 AM_{281}, 2010 VK_{201}, ^{§}2014 TZ_{85}, 2025 EA16 (H = 4.71 ± 0.51), "TESS TNO-7" (Note: The object currently has no provisional designation)	760	620	540	480	440	410	380	360	340
4.80–4.89	^{§}2011 WJ_{157}, ^{§}2007 JH_{43}, ^{§}2008 OG_{19}, 2026 HZ22, 2014 FT_{71}, 1996 GQ_{21}, "TESS TNO-10" (Note: The object currently has no provisional designation)	730	600	520	460	420	390	360	340	330
4.90–4.99	2011 HP83, 2013 FS28, ^{§}2014 UM_{33}, ^{§}2014 VU_{37}, 2013 AT_{183}, 2014 BZ_{57}, ^{§}2014 JR_{80}, ^{§}2003 UA_{414}, ^{§}2011 OA_{60}, 2026 EK137, ^{§}2013 SF106 (H = 4.96 ± 0.27) "TESS TNO-4" (Note: The object currently has no provisional designation),"TESS TNO-8" (Note: The object currently has no provisional designation)	700	570	490	440	400	370	350	330	310

^{§} This object is scheduled for imaging with the Hubble Space Telescope in 2026, which may determine if it has a moon or moons, which if found could enable a measurement of its mass.

=== Candidates in the inner Solar System ===
The largest body in the outer asteroid belt, 10 Hygiea, is close to an equilibrium shape. This may be the result of a disruptive impact and the subsequent re-aggregation of most of its fragments. The research team that produced the high-resolution images that discerned Hygiea to be "nearly as spherical as Ceres" speculated that this "open[s] up the possibility for this object to be reclassified as a dwarf planet."

== See also ==
- Lists of astronomical objects
- List of trans-Neptunian objects
- List of Solar System objects by size
- List of gravitationally rounded objects of the Solar System
- List of former planets
- Planetary-mass moon
