= 28978 Ixion =

Plutino

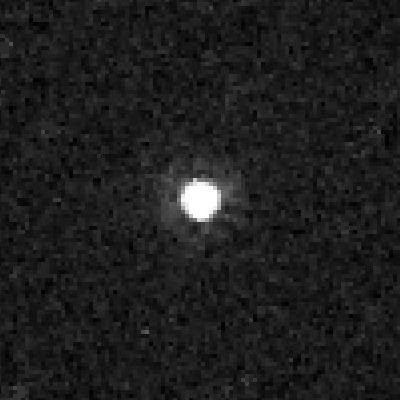
- Hubble Space Telescope image of Ixion taken in 2006

Discovery
- Discovered by: Deep Ecliptic Survey
- Discovery site: Cerro Tololo Obs.
- Discovery date: 22 May 2001

Designations
- Pronunciation: /ɪkˈsaɪ.ən/
- Named after: Ιξίων Ixīōn
- Alternative designations: 2001 KX_{76}
- Minor planet category: TNO · plutino · distant
- Adjectives: Ixionian /ɪksiˈoʊniən/
- Symbol: or (astrological)

Orbital characteristics (barycentric) (Note: These orbital elements are expressed in terms of the Solar System Barycenter (SSB) as the frame of reference. Due to planetary perturbations, the Sun revolves around the SSB at non-negligible distances, so heliocentric-frame orbital elements and distances (such as those given in JPL's Small-Body Database) can vary on short timescales.)
- Epoch 21 November 2025 (JD 2461000.5)
- Uncertainty parameter 0
- Observation arc: 39.88 yr (14,565 days)
- Earliest precovery date: 17 July 1982
- Aphelion: 49.136 AU
- Perihelion: 29.858 AU
- Semi-major axis: 39.497 AU
- Eccentricity: 0.2440
- Orbital period (sidereal): 248.06 yr (90,604 d)
- Mean anomaly: 294.975°
- Mean motion: 0° 0^{m} 14.361^{s} / day
- Inclination: 19.630°
- Longitude of ascending node: 71.031°
- Time of perihelion: ≈ 24 September 2070 (Note: JPL Horizons accurately calculates perihelion using numerical integration. The JPL SBDB assumes the object and the Sun are the only two objects in the universe and that the orbit is unchanging.)
- Argument of perihelion: 299.864°
- Known satellites: 0
- Uranus MOID: 11.41 AU (1.71 billion km)
- Neptune MOID: 2.34 AU (350 million km) (Note: A strong 3:2 resonance with Neptune prevents Ixion from getting this close.)

Physical characteristics
- Dimensions: 726.84+7.06 −7.70 × 667.96+14.14 −9.92 km (projected, occultation)
- Mean diameter: 696.78+10.75 −8.87 km (area equivalent)
- Flattening: 0.081+0.004 −0.010 (projected)
- Synodic rotation period: 12.4±0.3 h
- Geometric albedo: 0.106±0.003 geometric; 0.037±0.007 Bond
- Temperature: 64+0.7 −1.1 K
- Spectral type: IR (moderately red); B–V=1.06±0.03; V–R=0.61±0.02; V–I=1.146±0.086; R-I=0.54±0.03
- Apparent magnitude: 19.8
- Absolute magnitude (H): 3.845±0.006 (2026); 3.774±0.021 (2016)

28978 Ixion (/ɪkˈsaɪ.ən/; provisional designation 2001 KX_{76}) is a large trans-Neptunian object. It is located in the Kuiper belt, a region of icy objects orbiting beyond Neptune in the outer Solar System. Ixion is classified as a plutino, a dynamical class of objects in a 2:3 orbital resonance with Neptune. It was discovered in May 2001 by astronomers of the Deep Ecliptic Survey at the Cerro Tololo Inter-American Observatory, and was announced in July 2001. The object is named after the Greek mythological figure Ixion, who was a king of the Lapiths.

In visible light, Ixion appears dark and moderately red in color due to organic compounds covering its surface. Water ice has been suspected to be present on Ixion's surface, but may exist in trace amounts hidden underneath a thick layer of organic compounds. Ixion has a measured diameter of 697 km (433 mi), making it the fourth-largest known plutino. It appears to be a transitional object between irregularly-shaped small Solar System bodies and spherical dwarf planets. Ixion is currently not known to have a natural satellite, so its mass and density are unknown.

== History ==
=== Discovery ===
Ixion was discovered on 22 May 2001 by a team of astronomers at the Cerro Tololo Inter-American Observatory in Chile. Led by Robert L. Millis, the discovery took place through the Deep Ecliptic Survey, an astronomical survey for Kuiper belt objects located near the ecliptic plane, using telescopes of the National Optical Astronomy Observatory. On the night of 22 May 2001, American astronomers James Elliot and Lawrence Wasserman identified Ixion in digital images of the southern sky taken with the 4-meter Víctor M. Blanco Telescope at Cerro Tololo. Ixion was first noted by Elliot while compiling two images taken approximately two hours apart, which revealed Ixion's slow motion relative to the background stars. (Note: The Minor Planet Electronic Circular published in July 2001 lists two coordinates of Ixion taken from the two recorded observations at Cerro Tololo (observatory code 806) on 22 May 2001. The time between the first and second observations is 0.08127 days, or approximately 1.95 hours. Within this time interval, Ixion has moved about 0.41 arcseconds from its original position first observed by Cerro Tololo.) At the time of discovery, Ixion was located in the constellation of Scorpius. (Note: The given equatorial coordinates of Ixion during 22 May 2001 is 16^{h} 16^{m} 06.12^{s} and −19° 13′ 45.6″, which is close to the Scorpius constellation's coordinates around 17^{h} and −40°.)

The discoverers of Ixion noted that it appeared relatively bright for a distant object, implying that it might be rather large for a trans-Neptunian object. The discovery supported suggestions that there were undiscovered large trans-Neptunian objects comparable in size to Pluto. Since Ixion's discovery, numerous large trans-Neptunian objects, notably the dwarf planets Haumea, Eris, and Makemake, have been discovered; in particular, Eris is almost the same size as Pluto.

The discovery of Ixion was formally announced by the Minor Planet Center in a Minor Planet Electronic Circular on 1 July 2001. It was given the provisional designation 2001 KX_{76}, indicating that it was discovered in the second half of May 2001. Ixion was the 1,923rd object discovered in the latter half of May, as indicated by the last letter and numbers in its provisional designation.

At the time of discovery, Ixion was thought to be among the largest trans-Neptunian objects in the Solar System, as implied by its high intrinsic brightness. These characteristics of Ixion prompted follow-up observations in order to ascertain its orbit, which would in turn improve the certainty of later size estimates of Ixion. In August 2001, a team of astronomers used the European Southern Observatory's Astrovirtel virtual observatory to automatically scan through archival precovery photographs obtained from various observatories. The team obtained nine precovery images of Ixion, with the earliest taken by the Siding Spring Observatory on 17 July 1982. These precovery images along with subsequent follow-up observations with the La Silla Observatory's 2.2-meter MPG/ESO telescope in 2001 extended Ixion's observation arc by over 18 years, sufficient for its orbit to be accurately determined and eligible for numbering by the Minor Planet Center. Ixion was given the permanent minor planet number 28978 on 2 September 2001.

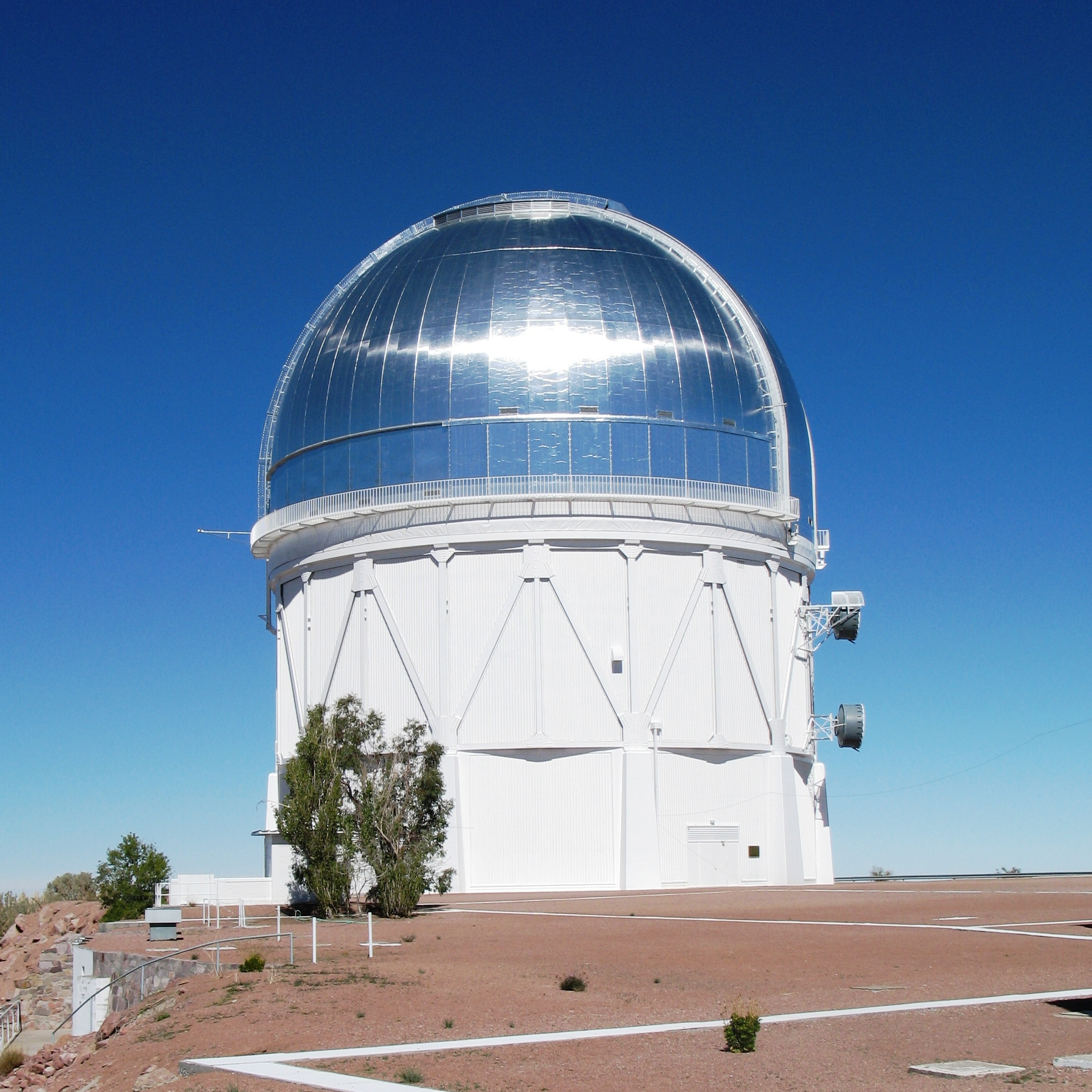
The Víctor M. Blanco Telescope (pictured) discovered Ixion in 2001

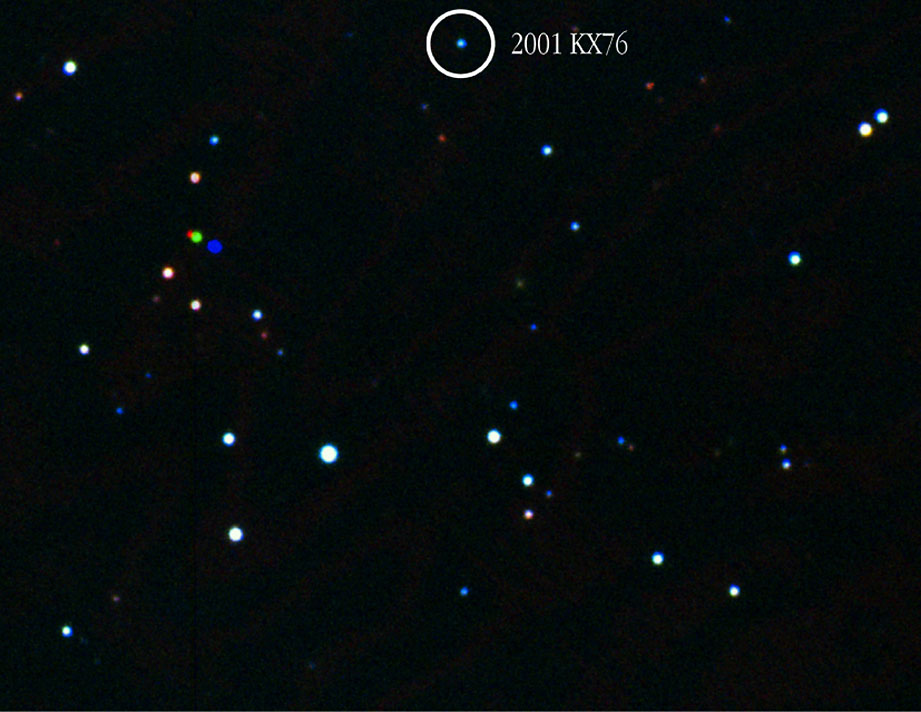
Ixion photographed by the MPG/ESO telescope's Wide Field Imager at La Silla Observatory in 2001

=== Name and symbol ===
This minor planet is named after the Greek mythological figure Ixion, in accordance with the International Astronomical Union's (IAU's) naming convention of naming plutinos (objects in a 3:2 orbital resonance with Neptune) after mythological figures related to the underworld. In Greek mythology, Ixion was the king of the Lapiths who was sentenced to an eternity of being bound to a burning solar wheel in the underworld. The name of Ixion was suggested by Elaine K. Elliot, the wife of one of the Deep Ecliptic Survey members. The naming citation was published by the Minor Planet Center on 28 March 2002.

Various symbols for Ixion have been proposed for astrology purposes. Sandy Turnbull proposed a symbol for Ixion, which includes the initials I and X as well as depicting the solar wheel that Ixion was bound to in Tartarus. Denis Moskowitz, a software engineer in Massachusetts who designed the symbols for most of the dwarf planets, substitutes the Greek letter iota (Ι) and xi (Ξ) for I and X, creating a variant. These symbols are occasionally mentioned on astrological websites, but are not used broadly. Another symbol is the wheel of Ixion,.

== Orbit ==
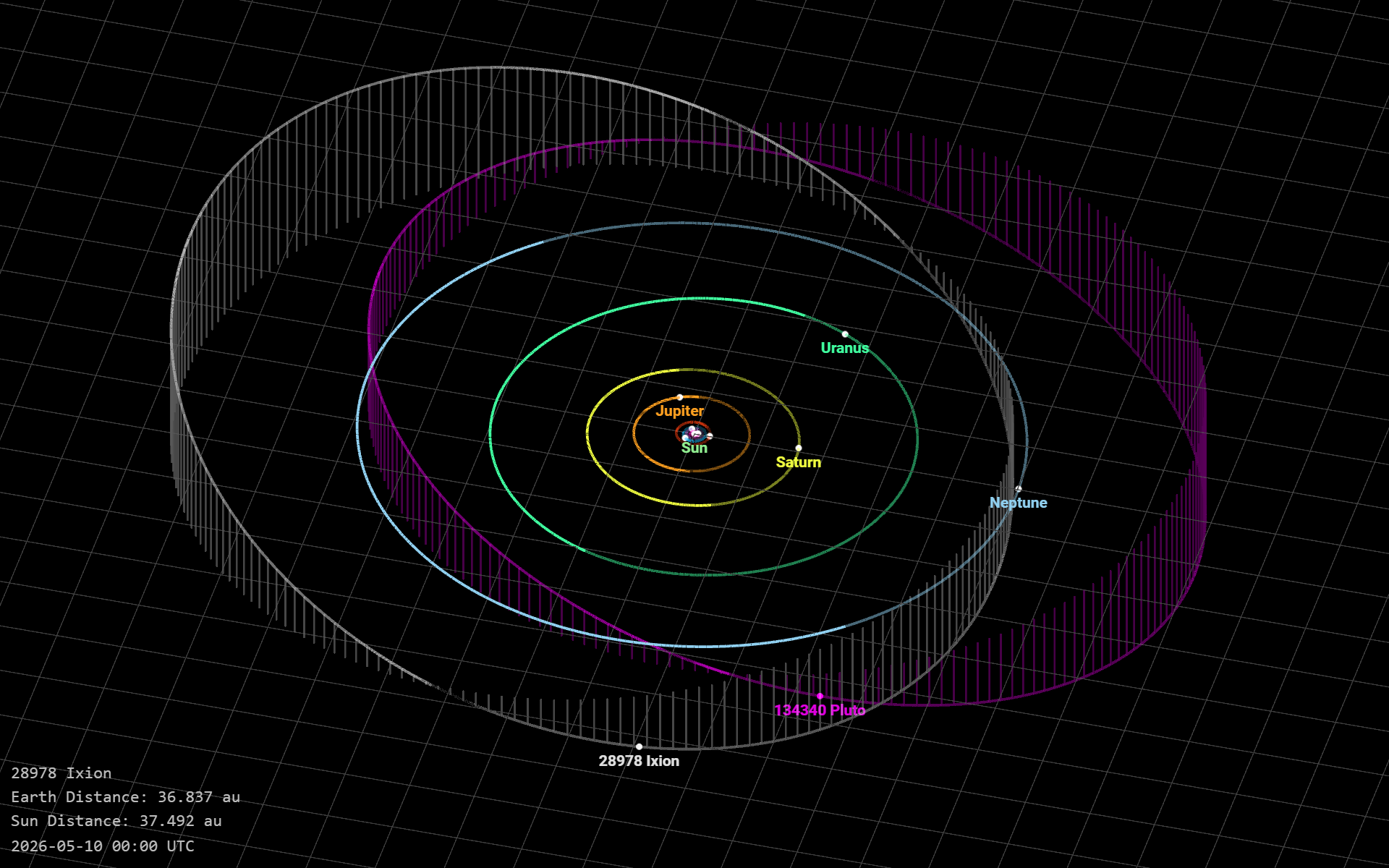
Diagram showing an oblique view of the tilted orbits of Ixion (white) and Pluto (magenta) compared to the main planets

Ixion orbits the Sun's barycenter with a semi-major axis of 39.5 astronomical units (AU), putting it in the Kuiper belt beyond Neptune's orbit. Ixion takes 248 years to complete one orbit, which places it in a 2:3 mean-motion resonance with Neptune. For every two revolutions it makes around the Sun, Neptune makes exactly three. It is therefore a member of the plutinos, a large population of trans-Neptunian objects named after its largest member Pluto. (Note: When Ixion was discovered, it was initially thought to be in a 3:4 orbital resonance with Neptune.)

Ixion's orbit closely resembles that of Pluto's, as both are plutinos. Ixion has an orbital eccentricity of 0.24 and an inclination of 19.6° with to the ecliptic, slightly greater than Pluto's inclination of 17°. Over the course of its current orbit, Ixion's distance from the Sun ranges from 29.9 AU at perihelion (closest distance) to 49.1 AU at aphelion (farthest distance). Ixion will come to perihelion on 24 September 2070. Due to gravitational perturbations by the giant planets, the orbital elements of Ixion vary over time. Simulations of Ixion's orbit show that in 10 million years, its semi-major axis can fluctuate between 39.1–40.0 AU, eccentricity between 0.20 and 0.30, and inclination between 15.0 and 19.5°. This means Ixion's perihelion can become as low as 27.5 AU and its aphelion as high as 51.9 AU.

== Rotation ==
The rotation period of Ixion is uncertain; various photometric measurements suggest that it displays very little variation in brightness, with a small light curve amplitude of less than 0.15 magnitudes. Initial attempts to determine Ixion's rotation period were conducted by astronomer Ortiz and colleagues in 2001 but yielded inconclusive results. Although their short-term photometric data was insufficient for Ixion's rotation period to be determined based on its brightness variations, they were able to constrain Ixion's light curve amplitude below 0.15 magnitudes. Astronomers Sheppard and Jewitt obtained similarly inconclusive results in 2003 and provided an amplitude constraint less than 0.05 magnitudes, considerably less than Ortiz's amplitude constraint. In 2010, astronomers Rousselot and Petit observed Ixion with the European Southern Observatory's New Technology Telescope and determined Ixion's rotation period to be 15.9±0.5 hours, with a light curve amplitude around 0.06 magnitudes. Galiazzo and colleagues obtained a shorter rotation period of 12.4±0.3 hours in 2016, though they calculated that there is a 1.2% probability that their result may be inaccurate.

== Physical characteristics ==
=== Size, shape, and brightness ===
History of size estimates for Ixion
Year	Diameter (km)	References
2002	1055±165	
2003	<804	
2005	<822	
2005	475±75	
2005	480+152 −136	
2007	650+260 −220 (Spitzer)	
2007	590±190	
2013	~549	
2013	617+19 −20	
2021	709.6±0.2	
2026	696.78+10.75 −8.87	

Observations of stellar occultations from 2020 to 2023 have shown that Ixion is a nearly spheroidal body with an area equivalent diameter of 697 km (433 mi). The shape of Ixion is slightly flattened, with its longest diameter being 727 km (452 mi) and its shortest diameter being 668 km (415 mi). Ixion's shape shows little change between different dates of occultation observations, indicating that it is mostly axisymmetric about its rotation axis (having a slightly triaxial shape). Compared to Pluto and its moon Charon, Ixion is less than one-third the diameter of Pluto and three-fifths the diameter of Charon. (Note: The current estimates of Pluto and Charon's diameters are 2376 km and 1212 km, respectively. One-third of Pluto's diameter is 792 km and three-fifths of Charon's diameter is 727 km—compare to Ixion's diameter of 697 km.) Ixion is the fourth-largest plutino with a measured diameter, after Achlys, Orcus, and Pluto.

Ixion falls in the 400–1,000 km (250–620 mi) diameter range where trans-Neptunian objects are typically observed with densities lower than that of water ice (1 g/cm^{3}). However, Ixion's mass and density are unknown because it is not known to have any natural satellites or moons. The Hubble Space Telescope observed Ixion in 2002 and 2006, but no moons brighter than 0.5% of Ixion's brightness were detected beyond an angular separation of 0.5 arcseconds. Stellar occultation observations from 2020 to 2023 showed no evidence of rings thicker than a kilometre in width and 0.1 in optical depth.

Optical observations of Ixion show that it has an absolute magnitude of 3.8 and a geometric albedo (reflectivity) of 0.11. In terms of absolute magnitude, Ixion was the brightest object discovered by the Deep Ecliptic Survey and is among the twenty brightest trans-Neptunian objects known according to astronomer Michael Brown and the Minor Planet Center.

When Ixion was discovered, it was thought to be the largest and brightest Kuiper belt object. Under the assumption of a low albedo, it was presumed to have a diameter around 1,200 km (750 mi), which would have made it larger than the dwarf planet Ceres and almost the size of Charon. Since then, more accurate measurements from infrared space telescopes and stellar occultations have revised Ixion's diameter downward, with the most accurate measurement being 697 km (433 mi) as of 2026.

Astronomer Gonzalo Tancredi considered Ixion a likely dwarf planet candidate because its diameter is large enough to become theoretically round under hydrostatic equilibrium, and its rotational brightness variation is low enough to suggest a nearly spherical shape. American astronomer Michael Brown considers Ixion to highly likely be a dwarf planet, placing it at the lower end of the "highly likely" range.

=== Spectra and surface ===
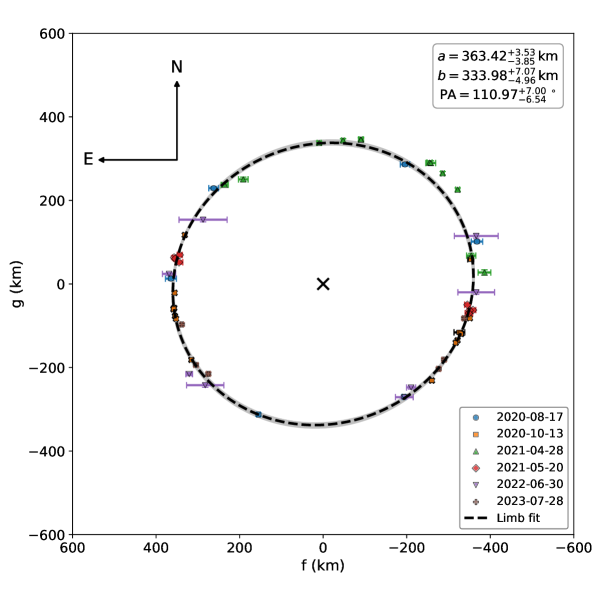
Plot of stellar occultation chord measurements of Ixion, showing its oblate spheroid shape

The surface of Ixion is very dark and unevolved, resembling those of smaller, primitive Kuiper belt objects such as Arrokoth. In the visible spectrum, Ixion appears moderately red in color, similar to the large Kuiper belt object Quaoar. Ixion's reflectance spectrum displays a red spectral slope that extends from wavelengths of 0.4 to 0.95 μm, in which it reflects more light at these wavelengths. Longward of 0.85 μm, Ixion's spectrum becomes flat and featureless, especially at near-infrared wavelengths. In the near-infrared, Ixion's reflectance spectrum appears neutral in color and lacks apparent absorption signatures of water ice at wavelengths of 1.5 and 2 μm. Although water ice appears to be absent in Ixion's near-infrared spectrum, Barkume and colleagues have reported a detection of weak absorption signatures of water ice in Ixion's near-infrared spectrum in 2007. Ixion's featureless near-infrared spectrum indicates that its surface is covered with a thick layer of dark organic compounds irradiated by solar radiation and cosmic rays.

The red color of Ixion's surface originates from the irradiation of water- and organic-containing clathrates by solar radiation and cosmic rays, which produces dark, reddish heteropolymers called tholins that cover its surface. The production of tholins on Ixion's surface is responsible for Ixion's red, featureless spectrum as well as its low surface albedo. Ixion's neutral near-infrared color and apparent lack of water ice indicates that it has a thick layer of tholins covering its surface, suggesting that Ixion has undergone long-term irradiation and has not experienced resurfacing by impact events that may otherwise expose water ice underneath. While Ixion is generally known to have a red color, visible and near-infrared observations by the Very Large Telescope (VLT) in 2006 and 2007 paradoxically found a bluer color. This discrepancy was concluded to be an indication of heterogeneities across its surface, which may also explain the conflicting detections of water ice in various studies.

In 2003, VLT observations tentatively resolved a weak absorption feature at 0.8 μm in Ixion's spectrum, which could possibly be attributed to surface materials aqueously altered by water. However, it was not confirmed in a follow-up study by Boehnhardt and colleagues in 2004, concluding that the discrepancy between the 2003 and 2004 spectroscopic results may be the result of Ixion's heterogenous surface. In that same study, their results from photometric and polarimetric observations suggest that Ixion's surface consists of a mixture of mostly dark material and a smaller proportion of brighter, icy material. Boehnhardt and colleagues suggested a mixing ratio of 6:1 for dark and bright material as a best-fit model for a geometric albedo of 0.08. Based on combined visible and infrared spectroscopic results, they suggested that Ixion's surface consists of a mixture largely of amorphous carbon and tholins, with the following best-fit model of Ixion's surface composition: 65% amorphous carbon, 20% cometary ice tholins (ice tholin II), 13% nitrogen and methane-rich Titan tholins, and 2% water ice.

In 2005, astronomers Lorin and Rousselot observed Ixion with the VLT in attempt to search for evidence of cometary activity. They did not detect a coma around Ixion, placing an upper limit of 5.2 kilograms per second for Ixion's dust production rate.

== Exploration ==
The New Horizons spacecraft, which successfully flew by Pluto in 2015, observed Ixion from afar using its long range imager on 13 and 14 July 2016. The spacecraft detected Ixion at magnitude 20.2 from a range of 15 AU (2.2 billion km; 1.4 billion mi), and was able to observe it from a high phase angle of 64°, enabling the determination of the light scattering properties and photometric phase curve behavior of its surface.

In a study published by Ashley Gleaves and colleagues in 2012, Ixion was considered as a potential target for an orbiter mission concept, which would be launched on an Atlas V 551 or Delta IV HLV rocket. For an orbiter mission to Ixion, the spacecraft have a launch date in November 2039 and use a gravity assist from Jupiter, taking 20 to 25 years to arrive. Gleaves concluded that Ixion and Huya were the most feasible targets for the orbiter, as the trajectories required the fewest maneuvers for orbital insertion around either. For a flyby mission to Ixion, planetary scientist Amanda Zangari calculated that a spacecraft could take just over 10 years to arrive at Ixion using a Jupiter gravity assist, based on a launch date of 2027 or 2032. Ixion would be approximately 31 to 35 AU from the Sun when the spacecraft arrives. Alternatively, a flyby mission with a later launch date of 2040 would also take just over 10 years, using a Jupiter gravity assist. By the time the spacecraft arrives in 2050, Ixion would be approximately 31 to 32 AU from the Sun. Other trajectories using gravity assists from Jupiter or Saturn have been also considered. A trajectory using gravity assists from Jupiter and Saturn could take under 22 years, based a launch date of 2035 or 2040, whereas a trajectory using one gravity assist from Saturn could take at least 19 years, based on a launch date of 2038 or 2040. Using these alternative trajectories for the spacecraft, Ixion would be approximately 30 AU from the Sun when the spacecraft arrives.

== See also ==
- (612533) 2002 XV93, a mid-sized plutino with an atmosphere discovered in stellar occultation observations
- 90568 Goibniu, a similarly sized trans-Neptunian object with no moons and a low albedo
- List of possible dwarf planets
