= 55637 Uni =

Classical Kuiper belt object

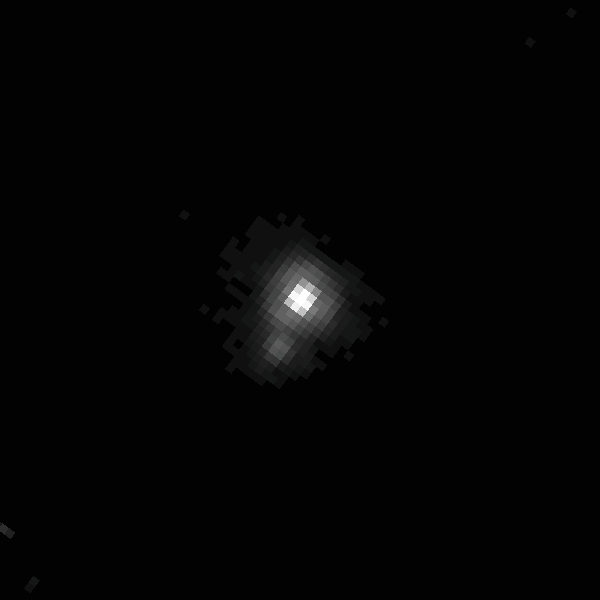
- Uni (center) and its moon Tinia (bottom left), imaged by the Hubble Space Telescope on 26 August 2005

Discovery
- Discovered by: Spacewatch (291)
- Discovery site: Kitt Peak National Obs.
- Discovery date: 30 October 2002

Designations
- Pronunciation: /ˈjuːnaɪ/
- Named after: Uni
- Alternative designations: 2002 UX_{25}
- Minor planet category: Cubewano (MPC); Extended (DES); Hot Classical Kuiper belt object

Orbital characteristics
- Epoch 5 May 2025 (JD 2460800.5)
- Uncertainty parameter 0
- Observation arc: 33.35 yr (12,182 days)
- Earliest precovery date: 12 October 1991
- Aphelion: 49.291 AU
- Perihelion: 36.716 AU
- Semi-major axis: 43.003 AU
- Eccentricity: 0.1462
- Orbital period (sidereal): 282.01 yr (103,005 days)
- Average orbital speed: 4.54 km/s
- Mean anomaly: 309.49°
- Mean motion: 0° 0^{m} 12.24^{s} / day
- Inclination: 19.400°
- Longitude of ascending node: 204.57°
- Time of perihelion: ≈ 5 September 2066 ±3 days
- Argument of perihelion: 275.27°
- Known satellites: 1 (Tinia)

Physical characteristics
- Mean diameter: 571±53 km (Note: Under the assumption of equal albedos); 610±53 km
- Mass: (1.25±0.03)×10^{20} kg
- Mean density: >0.80±0.13 g/cm^{3} (Note: This density estimate was made in 2017 using an outdated diameter estimate of 659±38 km. However, a recent occultation in 2026 have found a smaller diameter of 571 to 610 km, which means that it should probably indicate a higher density for Uni.)
- Equatorial surface gravity: 0.075 m/s^{2}
- Equatorial escape velocity: 0.227 km/s
- Synodic rotation period: 14.382±0.001 h
- Geometric albedo: 0.139±0.023; 0.122±0.02
- Temperature: 45.4 K (perihelion)
- Spectral type: CO_{2}-type ("double-dip"); B–V=1.007±0.043; V−R=0.540±0.030; V−I=1.046±0.034
- Apparent magnitude: 19.8
- Absolute magnitude (H): 3.87±0.02; 4.0

55637 Uni (provisional designation 2002 UX_{25}) is a large trans-Neptunian object that orbits the Sun in the Kuiper belt beyond Neptune. It briefly garnered scientific attention when it was found to have an unexpectedly low density of about 0.80 g/cm^{3}, though recent occultations indicate a higher density for the object.

It was discovered on 30 October 2002, by the Spacewatch program. Spitzer Space Telescope results estimate it to be approximately 659 kilometers (409 miles) in diameter. 2 occultations in 2026 measured diameters of 571 kilometers (355 miles) and 610 kilometers (379 miles). It has one known moon, named Tinia, which was discovered in 2005.

== History ==
=== Discovery ===
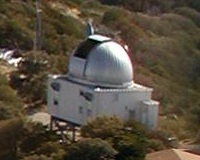
The 1.8 meter Spacewatch telescope that was used to discover Uni on 30 October 2002

Uni was discovered by the Spacewatch program on 30 October 2002. It has been observed 212 times with precovery images dating back to 1991.

=== Numbering and naming ===
Uni was numbered (55637) by the Minor Planet Center on 16 February 2003 (M.P.C. 47763). On 1 September 2025, the object was named after Uni (/ˈjuːnaɪ/), the ancient goddess of marriage, fertility, family, and women in Etruscan religion and myth, and was the patron goddess of Perugia. She is identified as the Etruscan equivalent of Juno in Roman mythology, and Hera in Greek mythology. As the supreme goddess of the Etruscan pantheon, she is part of the Etruscan trinity, an original precursor to the Capitoline Triad, made up of her husband Tinia, the god of the sky, and daughter Menrva, the goddess of wisdom.

Its moon was named together with Uni on 1 September 2025 after Tinia, the Etruscan sky god and husband of the Etruscan goddess of love and fertility Uni.

== Orbit and classification ==
Uni's orbital diagram

Uni orbits the Sun at a distance of 36.7–49.3 astronomical units (AU) with a semi-major axis or average orbital distance of 43.0 AU once every 282.0 years. Its orbit has an eccentricity of 0.146 and an inclination of 19.4° with respect to the ecliptic. It will reach its perihelion of 36.7 AU on 5 September 2066 with an uncertainty rate of 3 days. As of 2020, Uni is 40 AU from the Sun.

Uni is located in the classical region of the Kuiper belt 39–48 AU from the Sun, and is thus classified as a typical member of a classical Kuiper belt object (also known as a "cubewano"). This classical population is most concentrated in a range between 42 and 47 AU. The high orbital inclination of Uni makes it a dynamically "hot" member of the classical Kuiper belt, separating it from the flat "cold" classical objects that have tilts under 5°. The hot classical Kuiper belt objects are believed to have been scattered by Neptune's gravitational influence into their dynamically excited paths during the Solar System's early history. The Minor Planet Center classifies Uni as a cubewano while the Deep Ecliptic Survey (DES) classifies it as scattered-extended. The DES using a 10 My integration (last observation: 2009-10-22) shows it with a minimum perihelion (q_{min}) distance of 36.3 AU.

== Physical characteristics ==
=== Size and rotation ===
History of size estimates for Uni
Year	Uni + Tinia diameter (km)	Uni diameter (km)	Method	References
2007	681.2+115.6 −114.0	—	Thermal (Spitzer)	Stansberry u. a.
2009	680+106 −108	—	Thermal (Spitzer)	Brucker and u a.
2010	681	—	Assumption	Tancredi
2013	705	—	Thermal (Spitzer)	Mommert u. a.
2013	697.2+23.0 −24.5	665±29	Thermal (NEATM)	Fornasier u. a.
2013	692±23	664	Assuming same albedos	Brown
2014	697±35	670±34	Thermal (NEATM)	Vilenius u. a.
2017	698±40	659±38	Thermal (ALMA)	Brown u. a.
2017	695+30 −29	—	Thermal (ALMA)	Lellouch u. a.
2018	704	—	Assumption	Brown
2026	—	571±53 km 610±53 km	Stellar occultation	Rommel

A variability of the visual brightness was detected which could be fit to a period of 14.38 or 16.78 h (depending on a single-peaked or double peaked curve). The light-curve amplitude is ΔM = 0.21±0.06.

Uni has an absolute magnitude of about 3.87±0.02. The analysis of combined thermal radiometry of Uni from measurements by the Spitzer Space Telescope and Herschel Space Telescope indicates an effective diameter of 692 ± 23 km and albedo of 0.107+0.005
−0.008. Assuming equal albedos for the primary and secondary it leads to the size estimates of ~664 km and ~190 km, respectively. If the albedo of the secondary is half of that of the primary the estimates become ~640 and ~260 km, respectively. Using an improved thermophysical model slightly different sizes were obtained for Uni and Tinia: 659 km and 230 km, respectively.

2 stellar occultations from 2026 derived albedos of 0.139±0.023 or 0.122±0.02 and diameters of 571±53 km or 610±53 km for Uni respectively.

=== Surface and spectrum ===
Uni has red featureless spectrum in the visible and near-infrared but has a negative slope in the K-band, which may indicate the presence of the methanol compounds on the surface. Uni has a B–V color index of 1.007±0.043. It is redder than Varuna, unlike its neutral-colored "twin" 2002 TX300, in spite of similar brightness and orbital elements.

=== Density ===
Uni has a measured low density of 0.80±0.13 g/cm^{3}. The low density of this and many other mid-sized TNOs implies that they have never compressed into fully solid bodies, let alone differentiated or collapsed into hydrostatic equilibrium, and so highly unlikely to be dwarf planets. However, this density estimate was made in 2017 using an outdated diameter estimate of 659±38 km, a recent occultation in 2026 have found a smaller diameter of 571 to 610 km, which means that it should probably indicate a higher density for Uni.

=== Composition ===
With a density of >0.80±0.13 g/cm^{3}, assuming that the primary and satellite have the same density, Uni is one of the largest known solid objects in the Solar System that is less dense than water. Why this should be is not well understood, because objects of its size in the Kuiper belt often contain a fair amount of rock and are hence pretty dense. To have a similar composition to other large KBOs, it would have to be exceptionally porous; this low density initially surprised astronomers. However, studies by Grundy et al. suggest that at the low temperatures that prevail beyond Neptune, ice is quite strong and can support significant porosity in objects significantly larger than Uni, particularly if rock is present; the low density could thus be a consequence of this object failing to warm sufficiently during its formation to significantly deform the ice and fill these interstitial spaces.

Density comparison
Material	Density (g/cm^{3})	References
Settled snow	0.2–0.3	
Slush/firn	0.35–0.9	
Uni	>0.67–0.93	
Glacier ice	0.83–0.92	
Tethys	0.984	
Liquid water	1	

== Satellite ==
Uni has one known moon, which is named Tinia, after the Etruscan sky god and husband of Uni. Tinia was discovered in August 2005. Tinia has area equivalent diameters of 180.8±0.6 km or 193.0±1.0 km, The 180.8±0.6 km estimate is the minimum size for a spherical moon that the study obtained, which is the study's preferred estimate. Its orbital period is 8.309±0.0002 days, at a distance of 4770±40 km, indicating a total system mass of (1.25±0.03)×10^{20} kg.

== See also ==
- 229762 Gǃkúnǁʼhòmdímà – mid-sized trans-Neptunian object with a moon and a similarly low density of 1.0 g/cm^{3}
