= 229762 Gǃkúnǁʼhòmdímà =

Scattered-disc object

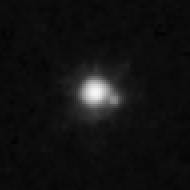
- Gǃkúnǁʼhòmdímà and its satellite Gǃòʼé ǃHú, imaged by the Hubble Space Telescope on 2 January 2018

Discovery
- Discovered by: M. E. Schwamb; M. E. Brown; D. L. Rabinowitz
- Discovery site: Palomar Obs.
- Discovery date: 19 October 2007

Designations
- Pronunciation: English: /ˌɡuːnhoʊmˈdiːmə/; Juǀʼhoan: [ᶢᵏǃ͡χʼṹᵑ̊ǁʰʊ̀mdímà]
- Named after: Gǃkúnǁʼhòmdímà (San mythology)
- Alternative designations: 2007 UK_{126}
- Minor planet category: TNO; Scat-ext; SDO distant
- Symbol: (astrological)

Orbital characteristics
- Epoch 5 May 2025 (JD 2460800.5)
- Uncertainty parameter 1
- Observation arc: 42.52 yr (15,529 d)
- Earliest precovery date: 16 August 1982
- Aphelion: 111.57 AU (16.691 Tm)
- Perihelion: 37.600 AU (5.6249 Tm)
- Semi-major axis: 74.58 AU (11.157 Tm)
- Eccentricity: 0.4959
- Orbital period (sidereal): 644.12 yr (235265±9 d)
- Mean anomaly: 348.466°
- Mean motion: 0° 0^{m} 5.509^{s} / day
- Inclination: 23.3389°
- Longitude of ascending node: 131.2214°
- Time of perihelion: 23 December 2045
- Argument of perihelion: 345.856°
- Known satellites: 1 (Gǃòʼé ǃHú)

Physical characteristics
- Dimensions: 658+8 −6 × 658+8 −6 × 588+22 −20 km
- Mean diameter: 634+10 −8 km
- Flattening: 0.105+0.05 −0.04; 0.118+0.055 −0.048
- Mass: (1.361±0.033)×10^{20} kg (total system mass)
- Mean density: 1.007+0.050 −0.049 g/cm^{3}
- Synodic rotation period: possibly 11.05 h, within 11 to 41 hours
- Geometric albedo: 0.142±0.015; 0.150±0.016
- Temperature: 50–55 K max. 44.4 K (perihelion)
- Spectral type: CO_{2}-type ("double-dip"); (moderately red); V–R = 0.62±0.05; V–I = 1.028±0.027
- Apparent magnitude: 20.8
- Absolute magnitude (H): 3.45

229762 Gǃkúnǁʼhòmdímà (provisional designation 2007 UK_{126}) is a large binary trans-Neptunian object and dwarf planet candidate in the scattered disc, located in the outermost region of the Solar System. It was discovered on 19 October 2007 by American astronomers Megan Schwamb, Michael Brown, and David Rabinowitz at the Palomar Observatory in California.

Gǃkúnǁʼhòmdímà measures approximately 600 kilometers (400 miles) in diameter. This medium-sized TNO appears to be representative of a class of mid-sized objects under approximately 1000 km that have not collapsed into fully solid bodies. Its 100-kilometer moon was discovered by Keith Noll, Will Grundy, and colleagues with the Hubble Space Telescope in 2008, and named Gǃòʼé ǃHú.

== History ==
=== Discovery ===
Gǃkúnǁʼhòmdímà was discovered on 19 October 2007 by American astronomers Megan Schwamb, Michael Brown, and David Rabinowitz at the Palomar Observatory in California.

=== Numbering, naming and provisional designation ===
When the discovery of Gǃkúnǁʼhòmdímà was announced on 26 February 2008, the Minor Planet Center (MPC) gave the object the provisional designation 2007 UK_{126}, which indicates its discovery date. The MPC later gave it the minor planet catalog number of 229762 on 31 December 2009. The International Astronomical Union's Small Bodies Nomenclature Committee officially named the object Gǃkúnǁʼhòmdímà and its moon Gǃòʼé ǃHú on 6 April 2019.

The name Gǃkúnǁʼhòmdímà is from the Juǀʼhoansi (ǃKung) people of Namibia. In Juǀʼhoan mythology, G!kúnǁ'hòmdímà appears as an aardvark defending her people using gǁámígǁàmì spines, (Note: Gǁámígǁàmì is a spiny plant, variously identified, including as Tribulus terrestris 'Devil's-thorn'.) hail, and her oryx horn. The name is composed of gǃkún 'aardvark', ǁʼhòm mà 'young woman' and the feminine suffix dí. The moon Gǃòʼé ǃHú is named after her horn; it means simply gǃòʼé 'oryx' ǃhú 'horn'.

In the Juǀʼhoan language, the primary and moon names are pronounced [ᶢᵏǃ͡χʼṹ ᵑ̊ǁʰòmdí mà] and [ᶢǃòˀé ǃʰú], respectively. Usually, when speaking English, the click consonants in words from Juǀʼhoan and other San languages are simply ignored (much as Xhosa is pronounced /ˈkoʊzə/ (KOH-zə) rather than [ǁʰosa]), resulting in /ˌɡuːnhoʊmˈdiːmə/ (GOON-hohm-DEE-mə) for Gǃkúnǁʼhòmdímà and /ˌɡoʊ.eɪˈhuː/ (GOH-ay-HOO) or /ˌɡoʊ.eɪˈkuː/ (GOH-ay-KOO) for Gǃòʼé ǃHú.

ASCII renderings of the names would be ⟨G!kun||'homdima⟩ or ⟨G!kun//'homdima⟩ for the object and ⟨G!o'e !Hu⟩ or ⟨G!o'e!hu⟩ for the moon.

The usage of planetary symbols is now discouraged in astronomy by the International Astronomical Union, so Gǃkúnǁʼhòmdímà never received a symbol in the astronomical literature. There is no standard symbol for Gǃkúnǁʼhòmdímà used by astrologers either. An aardvark's head has been used.

== Orbit and classification ==
=== Orbital characteristics and observations ===
Gǃkúnǁʼhòmdímà orbits the Sun at a distance of 37.5–107.9 AU once every 620 years and 2 months (226,517 days; semi-major axis of 72.72 AU). Its orbit has an eccentricity of 0.48 and an inclination of 23° with respect to the ecliptic.

An eccentricity of 0.48 suggests that it was gravitationally scattered into its current eccentric orbit. It will come to perihelion in February 2046, and mutual occultation events with its satellite will begin in late 2050 and last most of that decade. It has a bright absolute magnitude of 3.45, and has been observed 178 times over 16 oppositions with precovery images back to August 1982.

=== Classification ===
Gǃkúnǁʼhòmdímà belongs to the scattered disc. The scattered disc is a population of TNOs that have distant, eccentric, and inclined orbits that come close to Neptune at perihelion. (Note: Neptune's orbit is at 30 AU)

Scattered-disc objects such as the dwarf planets Eris and Gonggong and the large trans-Neptunian object Chiminigagua, are strongly influenced by Neptune's gravitational perturbations and consequently experience gravitational scattering.

Both the Minor Planet Center (MPC) and Johnston's Archive classify Gǃkúnǁʼhòmdímà as a scattered-disc object.

== Physical characteristics ==
=== Size, mass, density and shape ===
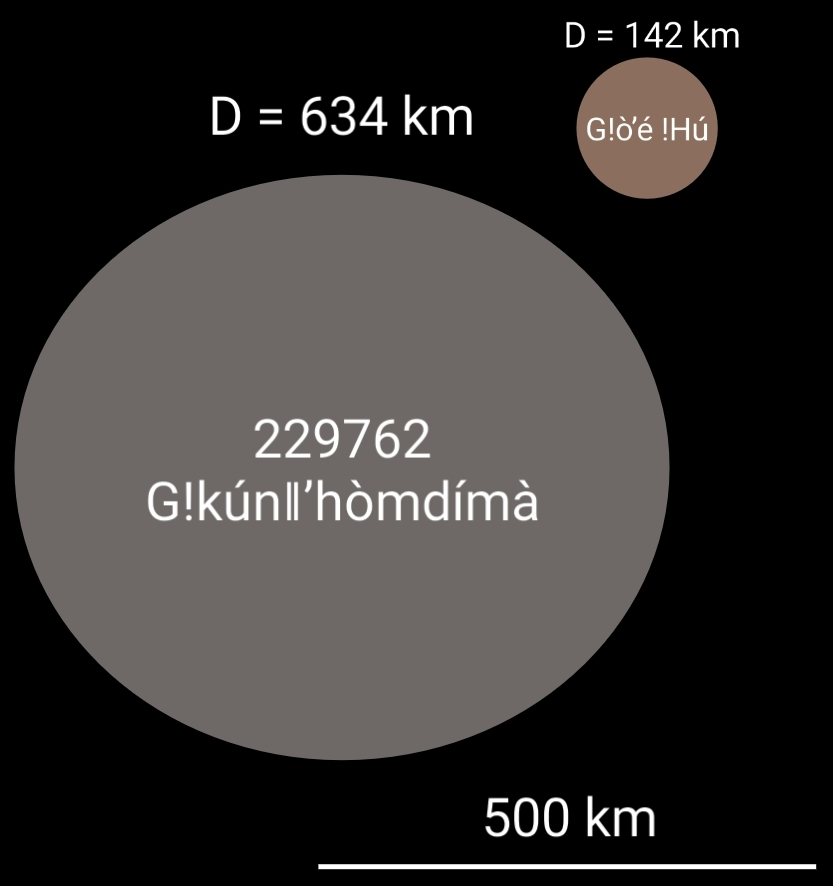
Gǃkúnǁʼhòmdímà and Gǃòʼé ǃHú size and color comparison

Stellar occultation events indicate that Gǃkúnǁʼhòmdímà has an effective (equivalent-sphere) diameter of 600–670 km, but is not spherical. Due to complications from its non-spherical shape, the rotational period cannot be definitely determined from current light-curve data, which has an amplitude of Δm = 0.03 ± 0.01 mag, but the simplest solution is 11.05 hours. It is almost certainly between that and 41 hours. The system mass is (1.36±0.03)×10^{20} kg, about 2% that of Earth's moon and a bit more than Saturn's moon Enceladus. The geometric albedo of Gǃkúnǁʼhòmdímà is approximately 0.15, and its bulk density is approximately 1 g/cm^{3}. The satellite Gǃòʼé ǃHú is unlikely to comprise more than 1% or so of the total.

=== Unlikely dwarf planet ===
Grundy et al. propose that the low density and albedo of Gǃkúnǁʼhòmdímà, combined with the fact that TNOs both larger and smaller – including comets – have a substantial fraction of rock in their composition, indicate that objects in the size range of 400–1000 km, such as Gǃkúnǁʼhòmdímà and 55637 Uni, retain a degree of porosity in their physical structure, having never collapsed and differentiated into planetary bodies like higher density or higher albedo (and thus presumably resurfaced) Orcus and Quaoar, or at best are only partially differentiated; such objects would never have been in hydrostatic equilibrium and would not be dwarf planets at present.

=== Surface and spectra ===
In visible light, the surface of Gǃkúnǁʼhòmdímà appears moderately red (color class IR or RR) with a geometric albedo of about 0.15. In near-infrared, however, its reflectance drops at longer wavelengths—a characteristic more typical of bluer TNOs (color class BB or BR) than moderately red ones. Because of this, Gǃkúnǁʼhòmdímà does not neatly fall within these four categories of TNO colors. Rather, it shares its outlying colors with some TNOs, namely (26375) 1999 DE9 and 145452 Ritona.

Near-infrared spectroscopy by the James Webb Space Telescope (JWST) has shown that Gǃkúnǁʼhòmdímà's surface is composed of water ice, carbon dioxide (CO_{2}) ice, carbon monoxide (CO) ice, and various organic compounds (tholins). This composition is shared among CO_{2}-type (aka "double-dip") TNOs, (Note: The "double-dip" TNO spectral type were later renamed to the "CO_{2}-type" in 2025.) which are commonly found on dynamically excited orbits such as those in the scattered disc (where Gǃkúnǁʼhòmdíma resides).

== Satellite ==
Gǃòʼé ǃHú
Discovery
- Discovered by: Noll et al.
- Discovery date: 2008

Designations
- Designation: (229762) Gǃkúnǁʼhòmdímà I
- Pronunciation: English:/ˌɡoʊ.eɪˈkuː/ Juǀʼhoan: [ᶢǃòˀéᵏǃʰú]

Orbital characteristics
- Semi-major axis: 6000±12 km
- Eccentricity: 0.0236±0.0066
- Orbital period (sidereal): 11.31473±0.00016 d (prograde)
- Inclination: 43.75°±0.38° (to J2000 equatorial frame)

Physical characteristics
- Mean diameter: 142±8 km
- Spectral type: V–I = 1.803±0.084

Gǃkúnǁʼhòmdímà has one known satellite, Gǃòʼé ǃHú, which is one of the reddest known TNOs. Size and mass can only be inferred. The magnitude difference between the two is 3.24±0.04 mag. This would correspond to a difference in diameter by a factor of 4.45±0.08, assuming the same albedo. Red satellites often have lower albedos than their primaries, though it is not known if that is the case with this moon. Such uncertainties do not affect density calculations of Gǃkúnǁʼhòmdímà, as Gǃòʼé ǃHú has only about 1% the total volume, and therefore is less important than the uncertainties in Gǃkúnǁʼhòmdímà's diameter.

== Proposed Exploration ==
Gǃkúnǁʼhòmdímà has not been visited by any spacecraft. It was selected as the Kuiper belt target of "Calypso", a New Frontiers class flyby mission concept studied for the 2023-2032 Planetary Science Decadal Survey. In the study's baseline design, the spacecraft would launch in 2035, use a Jupiter Gravity Assist, and flyby Uranus's moon Ariel in 2041, and reach Gǃkúnǁʼhòmdímà and its moon Gǃòʼé ǃHú in 2052.

During the flyby, Calypso would image both bodies in color, measure their shapes, topography, surface composition and temperatures, and look for signs of escaping volatiles or other surface activity. The concept was superseded by the Proposed Uranus Orbiter and Probe.

== See also ==
- 55637 Uni – mid-sized Kuiper belt object with a moon and a very low density of 0.82 g/cm^{3}, similar to Gǃkúnǁʼhòmdímà
- 532037 Chiminigagua – large scattered-disc object (≈740 km diameter) with a moon
