= Michael E. Brown =

American astronomer (born 1965)

- Brown in 2021
- Born: June 5, 1965 (age 61); Huntsville, Alabama, U.S.
- Education: Princeton University (AB); UC Berkeley (MA, PhD)
- Known for: Discovery of Eris and other trans-Neptunian objects How I Killed Pluto and Why It Had It Coming
- Spouse: Diane Binney (m. 2003)
- Children: 1
- Scientific career
- Fields: Planetary astronomy
- Doctoral students: Chad Trujillo, Marc Kuchner, Megan Schwamb, Konstantin Batygin
- Website: mikebrown.caltech.edu

Michael E. Brown (born June 5, 1965) is an American astronomer, who has been professor of planetary astronomy at the California Institute of Technology (Caltech) since 2003. His team has discovered many trans-Neptunian objects (TNOs), including the dwarf planet Eris, which was originally thought to be bigger than Pluto, triggering a debate on the definition of a planet.

He has been referred to by himself and by others as the man who "killed Pluto", because he furthered Pluto's being downgraded to a dwarf planet in the aftermath of his discovery of Eris and several other probable trans-Neptunian dwarf planets. He is the author of How I Killed Pluto and Why It Had It Coming, published in 2010. He was awarded the Kavli Prize (shared with Jane Luu and David C. Jewitt) in 2012 "for discovering and characterizing the Kuiper belt and its largest members, work that led to a major advance in the understanding of the history of our planetary system."

== Early life and education ==
Brown was raised in Huntsville, Alabama, and graduated from Virgil I. Grissom High School in 1983. He earned his A.B. degree in physics from Princeton University in 1987, where he was a member of the Tower Club. Brown completed his senior thesis, titled "Simulating the measurement of the correlation function of the Shane–Wirtanen galaxy counts", under the supervision of Edward J. Groth. He did his graduate studies at the University of California, Berkeley, where he earned an MA degree in astronomy in 1990 and a PhD degree in astronomy in 1994.

== Career ==
=== Discoveries ===
Brown is credited by the Minor Planet Center with the discovery or co-discovery of 29 minor planets, not counting Haumea (see list below). He has carried out several surveys for distant objects orbiting the Sun, and his team has discovered many trans-Neptunian objects (TNOs). These include Eris, a dwarf planet and the only TNO known to be more massive than Pluto, leading directly to Pluto's demotion from planet status; Sedna, a dwarf planet thought to be the first observed body of the inner Öpik–Oort cloud; and Orcus. Brown's team initially referred to Eris and its moon Dysnomia with the informal names Xena and Gabrielle, respectively, after the two main characters of Xena: Warrior Princess. Together with Jean-Luc Margot in 2001, he also discovered Romulus and Linus, two minor-planet moons in the asteroid belt.

=== List of minor-planet discoveries ===
| Number and name | Discovery date | | Discovery team |
|---|---|---|---|
| 50000 Quaoar | June 4, 2002 | list | ^{[A]} |
| 65489 Ceto | March 22, 2003 | list | ^{[A]} |
| (84719) 2002 VR128 | November 3, 2002 | list | ^{[A]} |
| 90377 Sedna | November 14, 2003 | list | ^{[A]}^{[B]} |
| 90482 Orcus | February 17, 2004 | list | ^{[A]}^{[B]} |
| (119951) 2002 KX14 | May 17, 2002 | list | ^{[A]} |
| (120178) 2003 OP32 | July 26, 2003 | list | ^{[A]}^{[B]} |
| 120347 Salacia | September 22, 2004 | list | ^{[C]}^{[F]} |
| (120348) 2004 TY364 | October 3, 2004 | list | ^{[A]}^{[B]} |
| (126154) 2001 YH140 | December 18, 2001 | list | ^{[A]} |
| (126155) 2001 YJ140 | December 20, 2001 | list | ^{[A]}^{[D]} |
| 136108 Haumea | December 28, 2004 | list | ^{[A]}^{[B]} |
| 136199 Eris | October 21, 2003 | list | ^{[A]}^{[B]} |
| 136472 Makemake | March 31, 2005 | list | ^{[A]}^{[B]} |
| (175113) 2004 PF115 | August 7, 2004 | list | ^{[A]}^{[B]} |
| (187661) 2007 JG_{43} | May 10, 2007 | list | ^{[E]}^{[B]} |
| 208996 Achlys | January 13, 2003 | list | ^{[A]} |
| 225088 Gonggong | July 17, 2007 | list | ^{[E]}^{[B]} |
| 229762 Gǃkúnǁʼhòmdímà | July 17, 2007 | list | ^{[E]}^{[B]} |
| (250112) 2002 KY_{14} | May 19, 2002 | list | ^{[A]} |
| (305543) 2008 QY_{40} | August 25, 2008 | list | ^{[E]}^{[B]} |
| (307251) 2002 KW_{14} | May 17, 2002 | list | ^{[A]} |
| 307261 Máni | June 18, 2002 | list | ^{[A]} |
| (315530) 2008 AP129 | January 11, 2008 | list | ^{[E]} |
| (386096) 2007 PR_{44} | August 7, 2007 | list | ^{[E]} |
| (504555) 2008 SO_{266} | September 24, 2008 | list | ^{[E]}^{[B]} |
| (523597) 2002 QX_{47} | August 26, 2002 | list | ^{[A]} |
| (523618) 2007 RT_{15} | September 11, 2007 | list | ^{[E]}^{[B]} |
| (523629) 2008 SP_{266} | September 26, 2008 | list | ^{[E]}^{[B]} |
| (528381) 2008 ST291 | September 24, 2008 | list | ^{[E]}^{[B]} |
Co-discovery made with:^{A} C. Trujillo · ^{B} D. L. Rabinowitz · ^{C} H. G. Roe^{D} Glenn Smith · ^{E} M. E. Schwamb^{F} K. M. Barkume

=== Haumea controversy ===
Brown and his team also had been observing the dwarf planet Haumea for approximately six months before its announced discovery by José Luis Ortiz Moreno and colleagues from the Sierra Nevada Observatory in Spain. Brown originally indicated his support for Ortiz's team's being given credit for the discovery of Haumea. However, further investigation showed that a website containing archives of where the telescopes of Brown's team had been pointed while tracking Haumea had been accessed eight times in the three days preceding Ortiz's announcement, by computers with IP addresses that were traced back to the website of the Instituto de Astrofísica de Andalucía (CSIC, Institute of Astrophysics of Andalusia), where Ortiz works, and to e-mail messages sent by Ortiz and his student. These website accesses came a week after Brown had published an abstract for an upcoming conference talk at which he had planned to announce the discovery of Haumea; the abstract referred to Haumea by a code that was the same code used in the online telescope logs; and the Andalusia computers had accessed the logs containing that code directly, as would be the case after an internet search, without going through the home page or other pages of the archives. When asked about this online activity, Ortiz responded with an email to Brown that suggested Brown was at fault for "hiding objects", and said that "the only reason why we are now exchanging e-mail is because you did not report your object." Brown says that this statement by Ortiz contradicts the accepted scientific practice of analyzing one's research until one is satisfied that it is accurate, then submitting it to peer review prior to any public announcement. However, the Minor Planet Center only needs precise enough orbit determination on the object in order to provide discovery credit, which Ortiz provided (see Timeline of discovery of Solar System planets and their moons to verify typical time scale of observation and publication of discoveries).

The then director of the IAA, José Carlos del Toro, distanced himself from Ortiz, insisting that its researchers have "sole responsibility" for themselves. Brown petitioned the International Astronomical Union to credit his team rather than Ortiz as the discoverers of Haumea. The IAU has deliberately not acknowledged a discoverer of Haumea. The discovery date and location are listed as March 7, 2003, at Ortiz's Sierra Nevada Observatory. However, the IAU accepted Brown's suggested name of Haumea, which fit the names of Haumea's two moons, rather than Ortiz's Ataecina.

=== Proposed ninth planet ===
In January 2016, Brown and fellow Caltech astronomer, Konstantin Batygin, proposed the existence of Planet Nine, a major planet between the size of Earth and Neptune. The two astronomers gave a recorded interview in which they described their method and reasoning for proposing Planet 9 on January 20, 2016.

=== Other work ===
In 2010 Brown published a memoir of his discoveries and surrounding family life, How I Killed Pluto and Why It Had It Coming.

== Honors, awards and accolades ==
Brown was named one of Time's 100 most influential people of 2006. In 2007 he received Caltech's annual Feynman Prize, Caltech's most prestigious teaching honor. Asteroid 11714 Mikebrown, discovered on April 28, 1998, was named in his honor. In 2012, Brown was awarded the Kavli Prize in Astrophysics.

== Students and postdocs ==
Brown's former graduate students and postdocs include astrophysicists Adam Burgasser, Jean-Luc Margot, Chad Trujillo, Marc Kuchner, Antonin Bouchez, Emily Schaller, Darin Ragozzine, and Megan Schwamb. He also has created a course on Coursera.

== Personal life ==
Brown married Diane Binney on March 1, 2003. They have one daughter.
