= (612620) 2003 SQ317 =

Trans-Neptunian object in the Haumea family

(612620) 2003 SQ_{317}
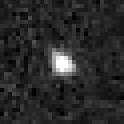
- Hubble Space Telescope image of 2003 SQ_{317} taken in 2009

Discovery
- Discovered by: CFEPS
- Discovery site: Mauna Kea Obs.
- Discovery date: 23 September 2003 (first observed only)

Designations
- Minor planet category: TNO · cubewano SCATEXTD

Orbital characteristics
- Epoch 4 September 2017 (JD 2458000.5)
- Uncertainty parameter 4
- Observation arc: 10.12 yr (3,698 days)
- Aphelion: 45.746 AU
- Perihelion: 39.231 AU
- Semi-major axis: 42.489 AU
- Eccentricity: 0.0767
- Orbital period (sidereal): 276.96 yr (101,159 days)
- Mean anomaly: 6.9467°
- Mean motion: 0° 0^{m} 12.96^{s} / day
- Inclination: 28.619°
- Longitude of ascending node: 176.34°
- Argument of perihelion: 191.81°

Physical characteristics
- Dimensions: 110 km for the higher albedo estimate
- Mean density: 0.8–2.7 g/cm^{3}
- Synodic rotation period: 7.210±0.001 h 7.5 h
- Geometric albedo: 0.05–0.50
- Spectral type: B−R=1.05±0.18
- Absolute magnitude (H): 6.2

(612620) 2003 SQ_{317} is a classical trans-Neptunian object and member of the Haumea family from the Kuiper belt located in the outermost regions of the Solar System, approximately 300 kilometers in diameter. It was first observed on 23 September 2003, by astronomers of the Canada–France Ecliptic Plane Survey at Mauna Kea Observatories on Hawaii. The surface of 2003 SQ_{317} is made of water ice.

== Physical properties ==
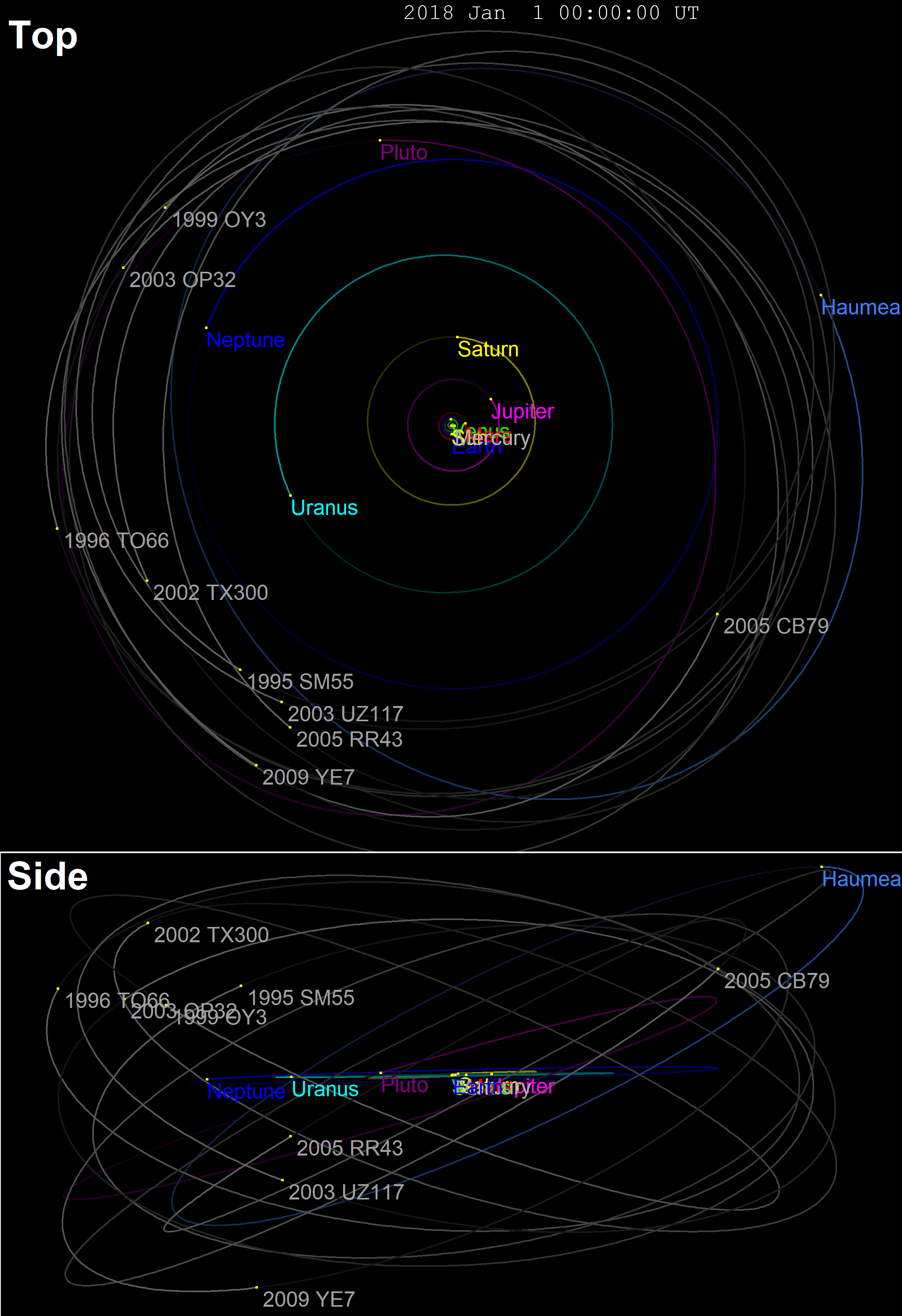
The orbits of multiple objects in the Haumea family. 2003 SQ_{317} is not shown in the diagram, though its orbit is similar to that of other objects in the Haumea family.

2003 SQ_{317} is a classical Kuiper belt object (cubewano) belonging to the hot population. Its size estimated to lie between 150 and 450 km based on a range of plausible albedos. The object has a large light curve amplitude of about 0.85, which indicates that it has an extremely elongated shape or is a contact binary. In the former case the density of 2003 SQ_{317} is estimated at 0.86 g/cm^{3} and its axis ratios at 0.55 and 0.41. If 2003 SQ_{317} is a contact binary, which is actually more likely, the density is estimated at 2.67 g/cm^{3}. In the latter case, the components are also thought to be unequal in size with the mass ratio of about 0.3 and axis ratios of about 0.8 and 0.5, respectively, for the primary and secondary components.

== Origin ==
2003 SQ_{317} was identified as a member of the Haumea family, which is defined based on a common pattern of IR water-ice absorption, neutral visible spectrum and the clustering of the orbital elements. The Haumea family members including (19308) 1996 TO66, (55636) 2002 TX300, (120178) 2003 OP32, (145453) 2005 RR43 and others all appear to be collisional fragments broken off of the dwarf planet Haumea.

== See also ==
- (139775) 2001 QG298
