= (202421) 2005 UQ513 =

Classical Kuiper belt object

(202421) 2005 UQ_{513}
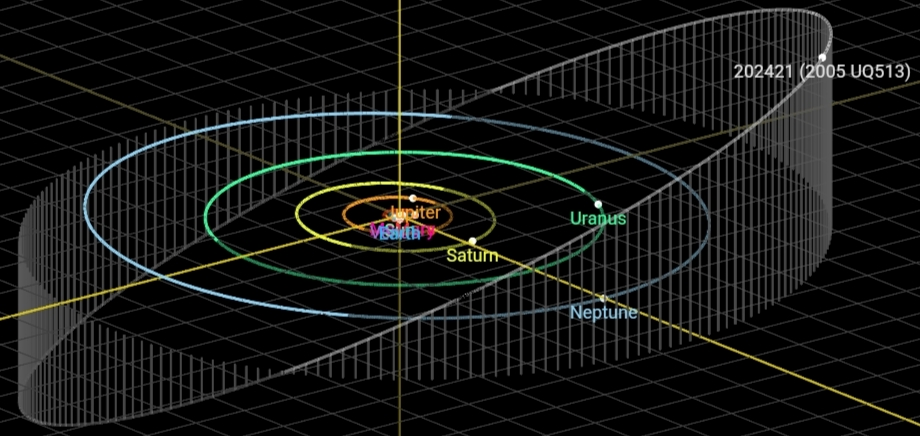
- The orbit of 2005 UQ_{513}

Discovery
- Discovered by: M. E. Brown; D. L. Rabinowitz; C. A. Trujillo
- Discovery date: 21 October 2005

Designations
- Minor planet category: classical (MPC); ScatExt (DES)

Orbital characteristics(Barycentric) (Note: These orbital elements are expressed in terms of the Solar System Barycenter (SSB) as the frame of reference. Due to planetary perturbations, the Sun revolves around the SSB at non-negligible distances, so heliocentric-frame orbital elements and distances (such as those given in JPL's Small-Body Database) can vary on short timescales.)
- Epoch 13 January 2016 (JD 2457400.5)
- Uncertainty parameter 3
- Observation arc: 8474 days (23.20 yr)
- Earliest precovery date: 15 September 1990
- Aphelion: 49.582 AU (7.4174 Tm) (Q)
- Perihelion: 36.844 AU (5.5118 Tm) (q)
- Semi-major axis: 43.213 AU (6.4646 Tm) (a)
- Eccentricity: 0.14738 (e)
- Orbital period (sidereal): 284.08 yr (103758.7 d)
- Mean anomaly: 226.72° (M)
- Mean motion: 0° 0^{m} 12.496^{s} / day (n)
- Inclination: 25.7046° (i)
- Longitude of ascending node: 307.5957° (Ω)
- Time of perihelion: 30 July 2123
- Argument of perihelion: 223.01° (ω)
- Known satellites: 0
- Neptune MOID: 8.05 AU (1.20 billion km)
- T_{Jupiter}: 5.253

Physical characteristics
- Mean diameter: 550 km 498+63 −75 km
- Synodic rotation period: 7.03 h (0.293 d)
- Sidereal rotation period: 7.03 hr
- Geometric albedo: 0.166±0.021; 0.202+0.084 −0.049
- Spectral type: 18.1 ± 2.0%/0.1 μm (Spectral slope)
- Apparent magnitude: 20.8; 20.74±0.03
- Absolute magnitude (H): 3.91

(202421) 2005 UQ_{513} is a large classical Kuiper belt object located in the trans-Neptunian region of the Solar System. It was discovered on 21 August 2005 by American astronomers Mike Brown, David Rabinowitz, and Chad Trujillo at the Palomar Observatory in California.

Measurements from an occultation show that it is 550 km in diameter. It has a highly reflective geometric albedo of 0.202+0.084
−0.049, which is higher than average for typical hot classical Kuiper belt objects. 2005 UQ_{513} completes one rotation relatively quickly every 7.03 hours. Visible spectroscopy observations show that 2005 UQ_{513} has a featureless spectrum with no detected absorption bands. However, its surface is very red due to a spectral slope of 18.1 ± 2.0%/100 nm, indicating a surface rich in complex organics. Models classify its orbit as dynamically stable over a period of 1 billion years. The Hubble Space Telescope is scheduled to observe the object in 2026 to search for potential moons. If a moon is found, it will allow scientists to directly calculate the mass and density of 2005 UQ_{513}.

== History ==
=== Discovery ===
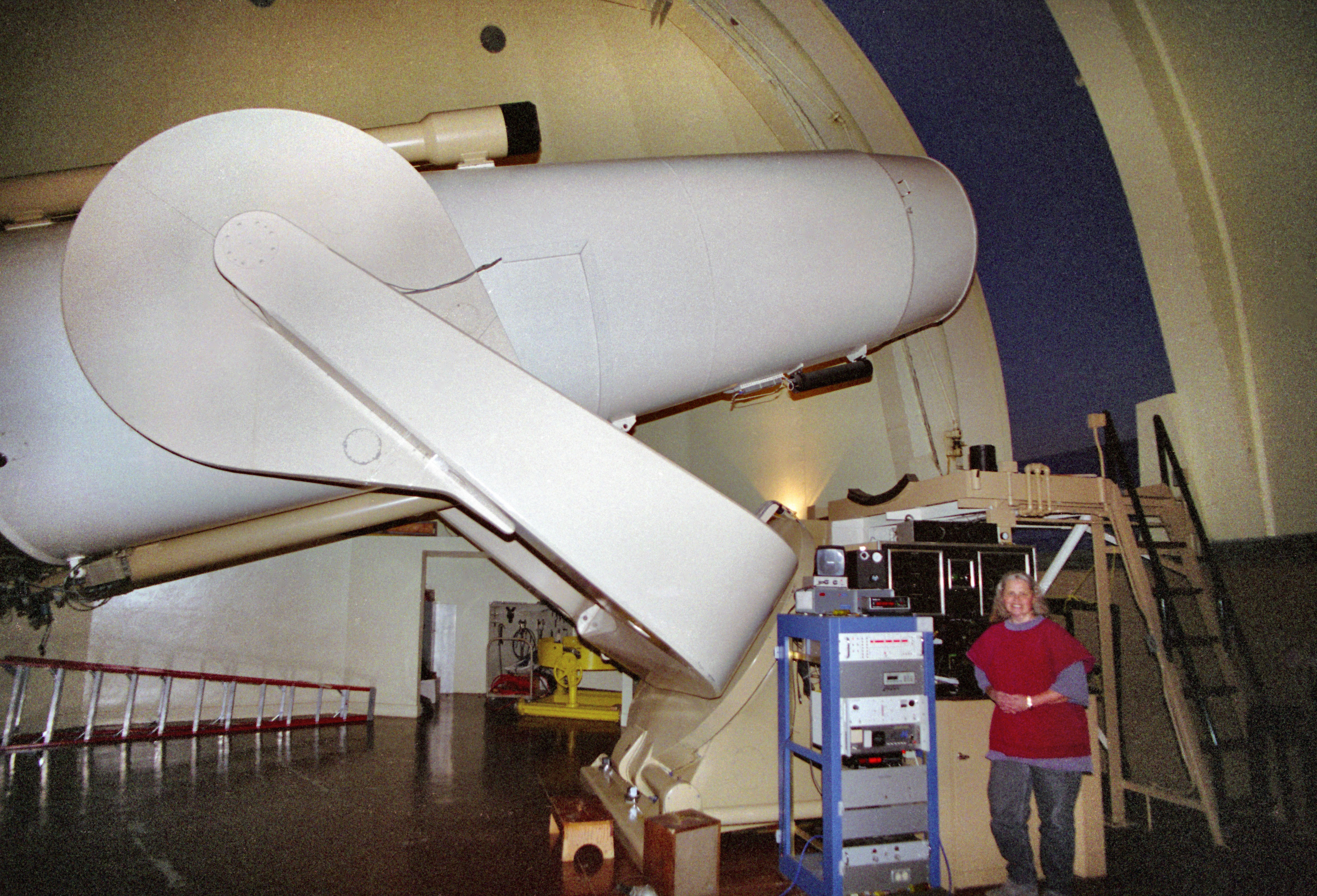
The 1.2-meter Samuel Oschin telescope that was used to discover 2005 UQ_{513} at Palomar Observatory

2005 UQ_{513} was discovered on 21 October 2005 by American astronomers Mike Brown, David Rabinowitz and Chad Trujillo at the Palomar Observatory (Note: The discoverer is labeled "Palomar" by the MPC.) in California, United States. At the time, they were searching for distant trans-Neptunian objects using the observatory's 1.2-meter Samuel Oschin telescope. It has been observed 750 times over 28 oppositions with precovery images back to 1990.

=== Further observations ===
Following its discovery, 2005 UQ_{513} was tracked by multiple stations, including the Apache Point-Sloan Digital Sky Survey, Purple Mountain Observatory, and Pic du Midi Observatory. As of 2026, the object has been observed 750 times over an observation arc of 13,112 days. 2005 UQ_{513} is scheduled for observation with the Hubble Space Telescope in 2026; if those observations discover a moon, they could lead to a measurement of the mass and density of 2005 UQ_{513}.

=== Provisional designation and numbering ===
The object was formally given the provisional designation 2005 UQ_{513} by the Minor Planet Center on 1 September 2007. The provisional designation of 2005 UQ_{513} indicates its discovery date, the first letter represents the second half of October and the second letter and numbers means that it is the 12,842nd object discovered during that half-month. (Note: The second letter 'Q' indicates that it is the 17th object discovered on the 514th cycle of discoveries. Each completed cycle consists of 25 letters representing discoveries, hence 17 + (513 completed cycles × 25 letters) = 12,842.) 2005 UQ_{513} was assigned its permanent number 202421 in December 2008.

== Orbit and classification ==
2005 UQ_{513} is a trans-Neptunian object that orbits the Sun at a distance of 36.8–49.6 AU with an semi-major axis or average orbital distance of 43.2 AU once every 284.1 years (for reference, Neptune's orbit is at 30 AU). Its orbit has an eccentricity of 0.15 and an inclination of 25.7° with respect to the ecliptic. As of November 2026, it is currently 46.4 AU from the Sun. It will come to perihelion in 2123.

2005 UQ_{513} is located in the classical region of the Kuiper belt 39–48 AU from the Sun, and is classified as a classical Kuiper belt object (also known as a "cubewano"). The high orbital inclination (25.7°) of it makes it a dynamically "hot" member of the classical Kuiper belt. The Minor Planet Center (MPC) also classifies it as a classical Kuiper belt object (cubewano) The Deep Ecliptic Survey (DES) classifies it as ScatExt (scattered-extended). Dynamically, it would have been a good candidate to be a member of the Haumea collisional family. However, given its red spectrum, it is probably not.

=== Orbital stability ===
In a 2021 study, scientists analyzed the orbital stability of 2005 UQ_{513} over a period of 1 billion years. Models calculated a diffusion time of 67.717 billion years, predicting its orbit to be very stable. In the full 1 billion year simulation, 199 out of 200 tracked test particles maintained regular orbits, leading that study to classify 2005 UQ_{513} as dynamically stable.

== Physical characteristics ==
=== Size, mass and density ===
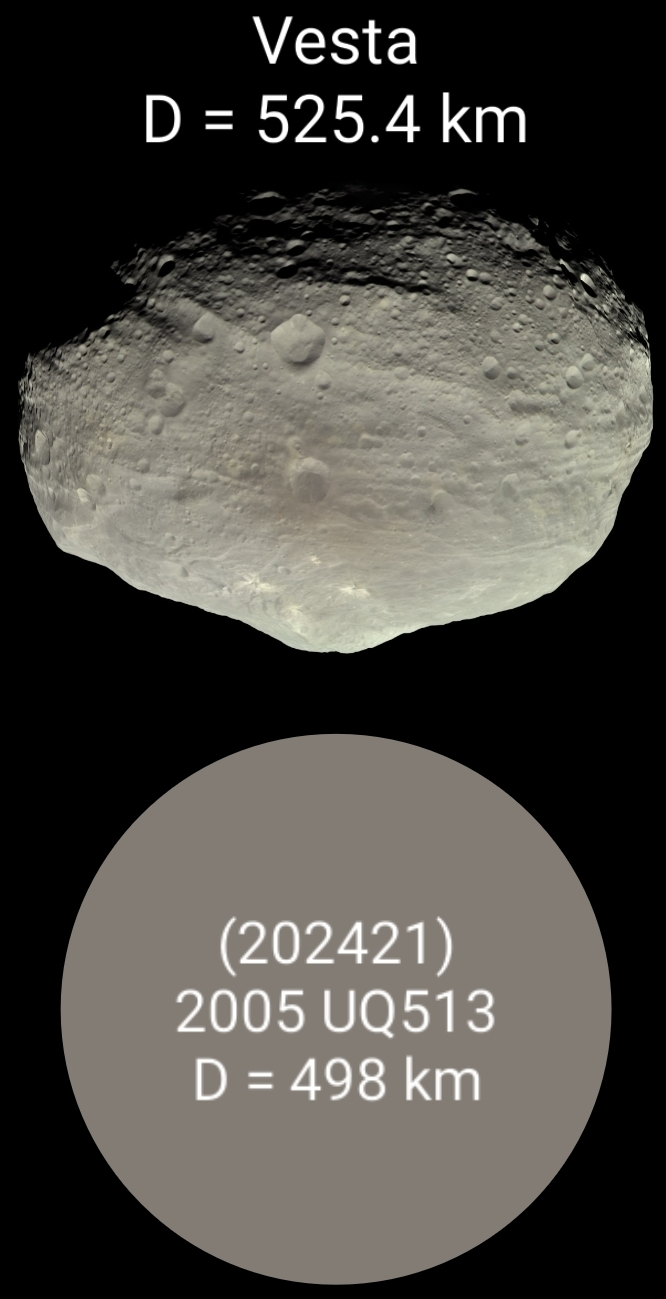
The second biggest asteroid, 4 Vesta and 2005 UQ_{513}'s size and true color comparison

A 2014 study based on thermal wavelengths have measured 2005 UQ_{513}'s size to be at 498+63
−75 km in diameter, making it approximately 5/9 the size of the dwarf planet Sedna. (Note: Sedna has a diameter of 906 km (563 mi). ⁵/_{9} of Sedna's diameter is 503.3 km (312.7 mi), which is roughly around 2005 UQ_{513}'s size.) A newer thesis by Mike Kretlow shows that a 2-chord occultation that happened on the 28th November, 2021 shows a diametre of 550 kilometres (340 mi), about 1/2 of the diametre of Quaoar. (Note: Quaoar has a diametre of 1,115.7 km (693.3 mi). 1/2 of Quaoar's diameter is 557.85 km (346.63 mi)) 2005 UQ_{513} is a very large trans-Neptunian object and is among the top 34 largest known TNOs. 2005 UQ_{513} is not known to have any natural satellites or moons, which means there is currently no way to measure its mass and density.

2005 UQ_{513}'s size is large enough that Mike Brown classify it as a possible dwarf planet, putting it in the 'very likely' zone. Based on its size of approximately 498+63
−75 km or 550 km, it belongs to the proposed class of "mid-sized" TNOs between 400 and 1,000 km (250 and 620 mi) in diameter, which are believed to represent the transition between small, low-density TNOs and large, high-density dwarf planets. In a 2019 study, William M. Grundy and his team have hypothesized that mid-sized TNOs should have highly porous and unheated interiors, because TNOs in this size range (such as Uni and Gǃkúnǁʼhòmdímà) have been found to have low densities around 1 g/cm^{3}.

=== Surface ===
==== Composition, spectrum and color ====
The visible spectra normalized to unity at 0.55 µm for the trans-Neptunian objects in the 2008 Pinilla-Alonso paper with (24835) 1995 SM55, 120347 Salacia, (2004 SB_{60}) (120178) 2003 OP32 and (416400) 2003 UZ117. 2005 UQ_{513} is located the second from top.

Spectroscopy observations show that 2005 UQ_{513} has a featureless spectrum with no detected absorption bands. The surface is very red, displaying a spectral slope of 18.1 ± 2.0%/100 nm, which makes it likely too red to be in the Haumea family. These measurements indicate that the surface contains a decent amount of processed materials composed of complex organics.

==== Albedo, brightness and visibility from Earth ====
2005 UQ_{513} has a visual absolute magnitude (H_{v}) of 3.91 according to the Jet Propulsion Laboratory, which was later refined to 3.87±0.14 by the Herschel survey. This brightness is similar to that of Varda. (Note: Varda itself has a visual absolute magnitude of 3.81±0.01, which is very similar to 2005 UQ_{513}'s 3.87±0.14) Thermal observations by the Herschel Space Telescope show that the object has a geometric albedo of 0.202+0.084
−0.049, but a newer occultation shows that it has an albedo of 0.166±0.021. This albedo value is higher than the average for typical hot classical Kuiper belt objects. However, due to its very far distance from Earth, it has a dim apparent magnitude of 20.8 when viewed from Earth.

=== Rotation ===
2005 UQ_{513} has a relatively fast rotation period of 7.03 hours, with its brightness varying by 0.06±0.02 magnitudes during each rotation, indicative of an approximate spheridal shape. For comparison, such rotation period is similar to the large plutino 208996 Achlys. (Note: Achlys has a rotation period of 6.7874 hours.)

== Origin ==
The hot classical Kuiper belt objects like 2005 UQ_{513} are believed to have been scattered by Neptune's gravitational influence during the Solar System's early history. 2005 UQ_{513}'s orbital position matches with the group very well, hence, it was considered a candidate for the Haumea family. However, 2005 UQ_{513} has a red surface spectrum and not a water-ice surface, making 2005 UQ_{513} likely an interloper that did not originate from the Haumea family impact.

== Exploration concepts ==
2005 UQ_{513} has not been visited by any spacecraft. A 2019 study on flyby mission opportunities between 2025 and 2040 calculated hypothetical trajectories to TNOs with H brighter than 4.0 including 2005 UQ_{513} using planetary gravity assists. A trajectory using a Saturn swingby has a launch window from 2025 to 2029, with a minimum travel time of 12.5 years. Trajectories using a Jupiter swingby have launch windows between 2031 and 2034, with a shorter flight duration of 10.4 years. Other than that, a combined Jupiter and Neptune swingby pathway makes launch options from 2032 to 2034, requiring a longer travel time of at least 23.4 years.

== See also ==
- List of trans-Neptunian objects
- List of minor planets: 202001–203000
- List of possible dwarf planets
- Classical Kuiper belt object
