= List of the brightest Kuiper belt objects =

Since the year 2000, a number of Kuiper belt objects (KBOs) with diameters of between 500 and 1500 km (more than half that of Pluto) have been discovered. 50000 Quaoar, a classical KBO discovered in 2002, is over 1000 km across. Makemake and Haumea, both announced on 29 July 2005, are larger still. Other objects, such as 28978 Ixion (discovered in 2001) and 20000 Varuna (discovered in 2000) measure roughly 500 km across. This has gradually led to the acceptance of Pluto as the largest member of the Kuiper belt.

The brightest known dwarf planets and other KBOs (with absolute magnitudes < 4.0) are:

| Number | Permanent Designation | Provisional Designation | Absolute magnitude | Bond Albedo (%) | Semimajor axis (AU) | Equatorial diameter (km) | Date found | Discoverer | Diameter method |
|---|---|---|---|---|---|---|---|---|---|
| 134340 | Pluto | | −0.8 | 72 | 39.4 | 2377 | 1930 | C. Tombaugh | direct imaging |
| 136472 | Makemake | 2005 FY_{9} | −0.2 | 80 | 45.6 | 1430 | 2005 | M. Brown, C. Trujillo, D. Rabinowitz | occultation |
| 136108 | Haumea | 2003 EL_{61} | 0.2 | 51 | 43.3 | 1595 | 2003 | Sierra Nevada Observatory (unofficial) | occultation |
| | Charon | S/1978 P 1 | 1.0 | 20 to 50 (geometric) | 39.4 | 1212 | 1978 | J. Christy | direct imaging |
| 90482 | Orcus | 2004 DW | 2.2 | 23 | 39.3 | 910 | 2004 | M. Brown, C. Trujillo, D. Rabinowitz | thermal |
| 50000 | Quaoar | 2002 LM_{60} | 2.4 | 11 | 43.7 | 1070 | 2002 | C. Trujillo, M. Brown | thermal |
| 174567 | Varda | 2003 MW_{12} | 3.2 | 10 | 46.1 | 705 | 2003 | J. A. Larsen | estimated |
| 55636 | | 2002 TX300 | 3.4 | 88 | 43.2 | 286 | 2002 | NEAT | Haumea family, estimated |
| 202421 | | 2005 UQ513 | 3.5 | 20 | 43.2 | 498 | 2005 | Palomar | estimated |
| 55565 | Aya | 2002 AW_{197} | 3.6 | 11 | 47.2 | 802 | 2002 | NEAT | occultation |
| 307261 | Máni | 2002 MS_{4} | 3.6 | 5 | 42.0 | 934 | 2002 | C. Trujillo, M. Brown | thermal |
| 208996 | Achlys | 2003 AZ_{84} | 3.6 | 10 | 39.4 | 772 | 2003 | C. Trujillo, M. Brown | thermal |
| 20000 | Varuna | 2000 WR_{106} | 3.6 | 11 | 42.3 | 678 | 2000 | Spacewatch | thermal |
| 55637 | Uni | 2002 UX_{25} | 3.6 | 11 | 42.5 | 665 | 2002 | Spacewatch | thermal |
| 28978 | Ixion | 2001 KX_{76} | 3.6 | 14 | 39.8 | 617 | 2001 | DES | thermal |
| 145452 | Ritona | 2005 RN_{43} | 3.7 | 11 | 41.6 | 679 | 2005 | A. C. Becker, A. W. Puckett, J. Kubica | thermal |
| 120178 | | 2003 OP32 | 3.9 | 70? | 43.4 | 218? | 2003 | M. Brown, C. Trujillo, D. Rabinowitz | Haumea family, estimated |

== See also ==
- List of trans-Neptunian objects
