= 145451 Rumina =

Scattered disc object

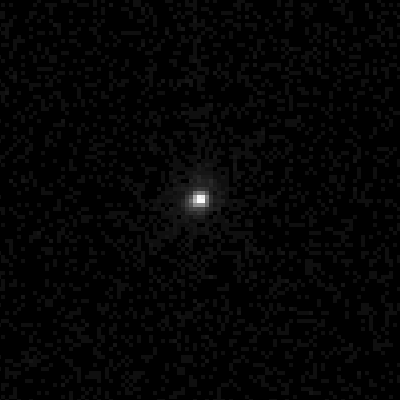
- Rumina imaged by the Hubble Space Telescope on 2 November 2008

Discovery
- Discovered by: A. C. Becker; A. W. Puckett; J. M. Kubica
- Discovery site: Apache Point Obs.
- Discovery date: 9 September 2005

Designations
- Pronunciation: /ruːˈmaɪnə/
- Named after: Rumīna
- Alternative designations: 2005 RM_{43}
- Minor planet category: SDO · TNO

Orbital characteristics
- Epoch 2025 May 05 (JD 2460800.5)
- Uncertainty parameter 1
- Observation arc: 48.18 yr (17,596 d)
- Earliest precovery date: 17 November 1976
- Aphelion: 149.67 AU (22.390 Tm)
- Perihelion: 35.147 AU (5.2579 Tm)
- Semi-major axis: 92.41 AU (13.824 Tm)
- Eccentricity: 0.6197
- Orbital period (sidereal): 888.36 yr (324475±19 d)
- Mean anomaly: 8.226°
- Mean motion: 0° 0^{m} 3.994^{s} / day
- Inclination: 28.6976°
- Longitude of ascending node: 84.629°
- Argument of perihelion: 318.672°
- Known satellites: 0

Physical characteristics
- Mean diameter: ≈644 km (derived from occultation; 455 and 460 km measured); 524+96 −103 km
- Mean density: >0.15 g/cm^{3} 0.48–0.63 g/cm^{3} (assuming a Jacobi ellipsoid)
- Synodic rotation period: 6.71 h (0.280 d); 9.00 h (0.375 d)
- Geometric albedo: 0.102
- Spectral type: V–R=0.33±0.02 (neutral); B_{0}−V_{0}=0.590; B–R=0.99
- Apparent magnitude: 20.4
- Absolute magnitude (H): 4.52±0.01; 4.58 · 4.8

145451 Rumina (provisional designation 2005 RM_{43}) is a large trans-Neptunian object in the scattered disc region beyond the Kuiper belt. It was discovered on 9 September 2005, by American astronomers Andrew Becker, Andrew Puckett and Jeremy Kubica at the Apache Point Observatory in Sunspot, New Mexico.

It measures approximately 600 kilometers in diameter, and has an albedo of ~0.102, with a grey colored surface.

== History ==
=== Discovery ===
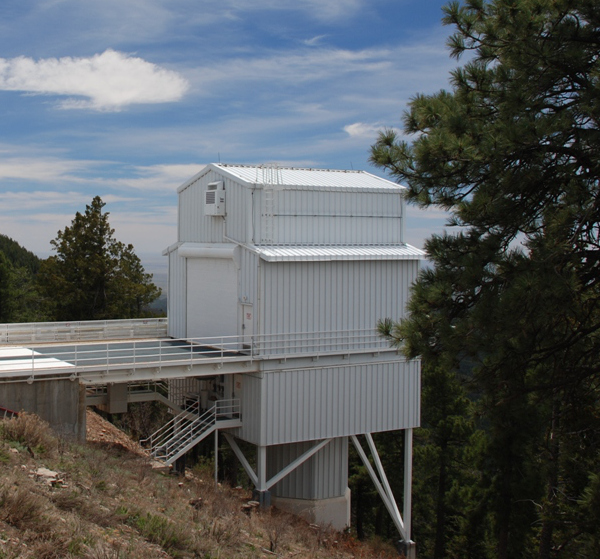
The 2.5-meter telescope at Apache Point Observatory in Sunspot that was used to discover Rumina back in 2005

Rumina was discovered by astronomers Andrew Becker, Andrew Puckett and Jeremy Kubica on 9 September 2005, during observations for the Sloan Digital Sky Survey. The discovery observations were made using the 2.5-meter telescope at Apache Point Observatory in Sunspot, New Mexico. The discoverers further observed Rumina until November 2005 and found the object in precovery observations from dates as early as October 1999. The discovery of Rumina was announced by the Minor Planet Center on 23 July 2006. Since then, Rumina has been found in even earlier precovery observations dating back to November 1976. Rumina has been observed 548 times, the orbit is well determined with an uncertainty parameter of 1.

=== Naming and numbering ===
The object is named after Rumīna, a Roman goddess who protected nursing mothers. The naming of this object was announced by the International Astronomical Union's Working Group for Small Body Nomenclature on 1 September 2025. Before Rumina was officially named, it was known by its provisional designation 2005 RM_{43}, which indicates the year and half-month of the object's discovery date. Rumina's minor planet catalog number of 145451 was given by the Minor Planet Center on 5 December 2006. The Kuiper belt objects 145452 Ritona and (145453) 2005 RR43 directly come after Rumina's number in the minor planet catalog.

== Orbit and classification ==
=== Orbital characteristics ===
Rumina orbits the Sun at a distance of 35.1–149.7 astronomical units (AU) with a semi-major axis or average orbital distance of 92.4 AU once every 888 years (for reference, Neptune's orbit is at 30 AU).

Its orbit has a relatively high eccentricity of 0.62 and an inclination of 28.7° with respect to the ecliptic.

=== Classification ===
Rumina belongs to the scattered disc, which is a population of TNOs that have distant, inclined, and eccentric orbits that come close to Neptune at perihelion.

The scattered disc population, which includes the dwarf planets Eris and Gonggong, are strongly influenced by Neptune's gravitational perturbations and consequently experience gravitational scattering.

Both the Minor Planet Center (MPC) and Johnston's archive classify that Rumina is a scattered disc object.

== Physical characteristics ==
=== Size ===
In 2018, two stellar occultations by Rumina were observed on 3 February and 24 December. The February occultation yielded a single chord length of 456 km (283 mi). Observations of the December occultation yielded two positive chords, which together suggest an approximate diameter of 644 km (400 mi). The object rotates on its axis once every 6.71 hours.

=== Density, shape, and rotation ===
Based on its size of 456 and 644 km, it belongs to the proposed class of "mid-sized" TNOs between 400 and 1,000 km (250 and 620 mi) in diameter, which are believed to represent the transition between small, low-density TNOs and large, high-density dwarf planets. In a 2019 study, William M. Grundy and his team have hypothesized that mid-sized TNOs should have highly porous and unheated interiors, because TNOs in this size range (namely Uni and Gǃkúnǁʼhòmdímà) have been found to have low densities around 1 g/cm^{3}. Johnston's archive estimate a density of >0.56 g/cm^{3} for Rumina.

The density and shape of Rumina have been calculated by studying its rotational light curve. Photometric observations show that Rumina has a synodic rotational period of 9.00±0.06 h and a light curve amplitude of 0.12±0.05 mag. This light variation indicates a primary axis ratio lower limit of 1.12±0.05.

Based on these rotational mechanics, the absolute minimum density required to keep the object from breaking apart due to centrifugal forces is 0.15 g/cm^{3}. If Rumina is assumed to be a rotationally stable Jacobi ellipsoid in hydrostatic equilibrium, its bulk density is modeled to be within the range of 0.48–0.63 g/cm^{3}, which is probably too low to be solid.

=== Surface and spectra ===
Rumina has an absolute magnitude of 4.52±0.01. The surface of Rumina is dark grey with a low albedo of 0.102 and a V–R color index of 0.33±0.02, which means that it has a neutral color.

== See also ==
- List of trans-Neptunian objects
- List of minor planets: 145001–146000
- List of possible dwarf planets
