= (308193) 2005 CB79 =

Trans-Neptunian object

(308193) 2005 CB_{79}
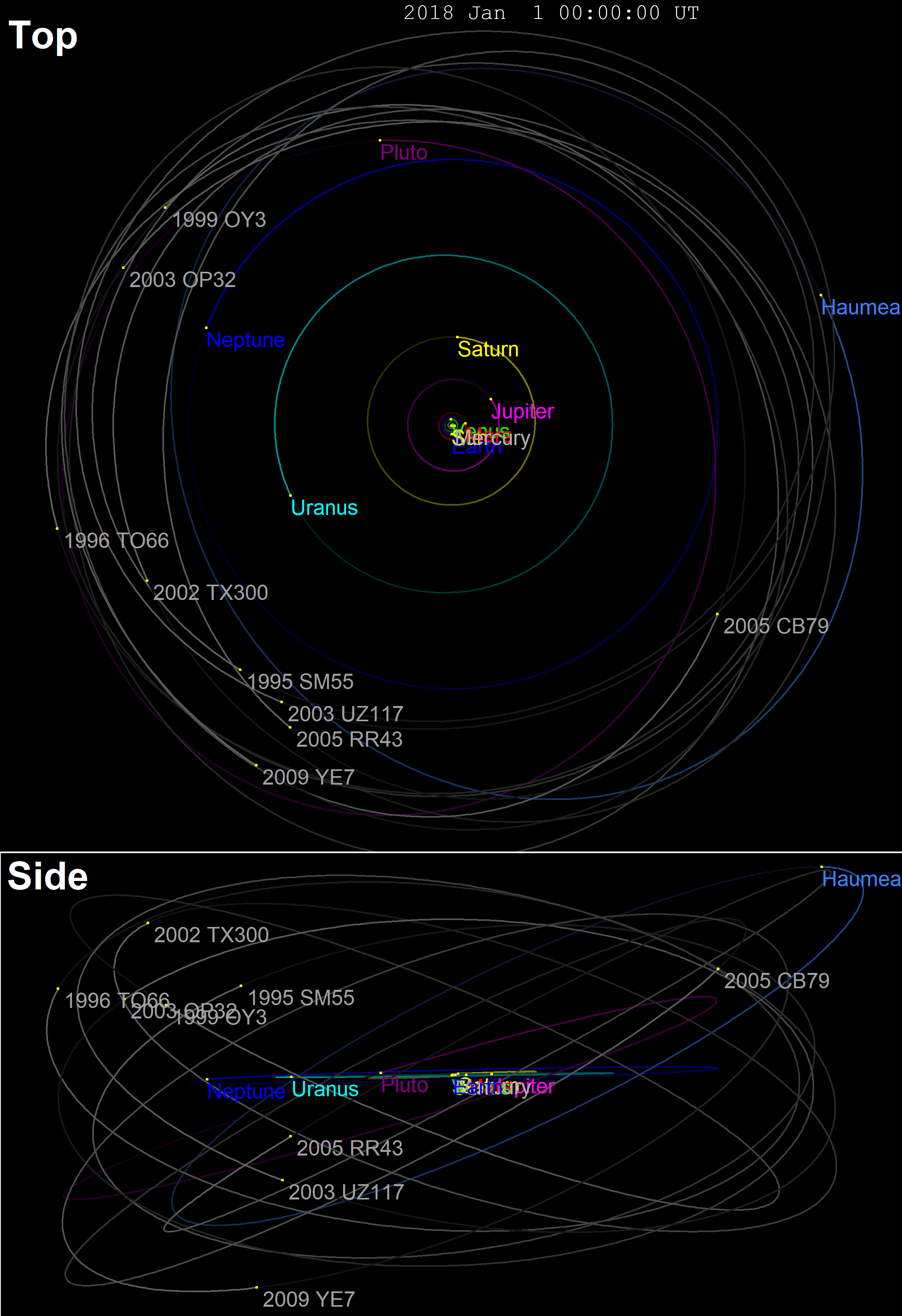
- 2005 CB_{79} among other Haumea family objects

Discovery
- Discovered by: M. E. Brown, C. A. Trujillo, D. L. Rabinowitz, C. B. Jenkins, D. G. Smallwood
- Discovery date: 6 February 2005

Designations
- Minor planet category: Cubewano (MPC); Extended (DES)

Orbital characteristics
- Epoch 13 January 2016 (JD 2457400.5)
- Uncertainty parameter 4
- Observation arc: 5083 days (13.92 yr)
- Aphelion: 50.062 AU (7.4892 Tm) (Q)
- Perihelion: 37.231 AU (5.5697 Tm) (q)
- Semi-major axis: 43.647 AU (6.5295 Tm) (a)
- Eccentricity: 0.14698 (e)
- Orbital period (sidereal): 288.36 yr (105324 d)
- Mean anomaly: 319.66° (M)
- Mean motion: 0° 0^{m} 12.305^{s} / day (n)
- Inclination: 28.606° (i)
- Longitude of ascending node: 112.79° (Ω)
- Time of perihelion: ≈ 5 December 2048 ±3 days
- Argument of perihelion: 90.154° (ω)

Physical characteristics
- Dimensions: 160 km
- Synodic rotation period: 6.76 h (0.282 d)
- Sidereal rotation period: 13.52 h
- Geometric albedo: 0.7 (assumed)
- Spectral type: (Neutral); B-V=0.73, V-R=0.37
- Apparent magnitude: 21.1
- Absolute magnitude (H): 4.58

(308193) 2005 CB_{79} is a trans-Neptunian object that is a member of the Haumea family.

== Haumea family ==
As a member of the Haumea family, 2005 CB_{79} is suspected of being an icy mantle collisional fragment from the dwarf planet Haumea. With an absolute magnitude (H) of 4.7, and a Haumea family albedo of 0.7, this object would have a diameter of 158 km.

Observations by Mike Brown in 2012 using the W. M. Keck Observatory suggest that 2005 CB_{79} does not have a companion.

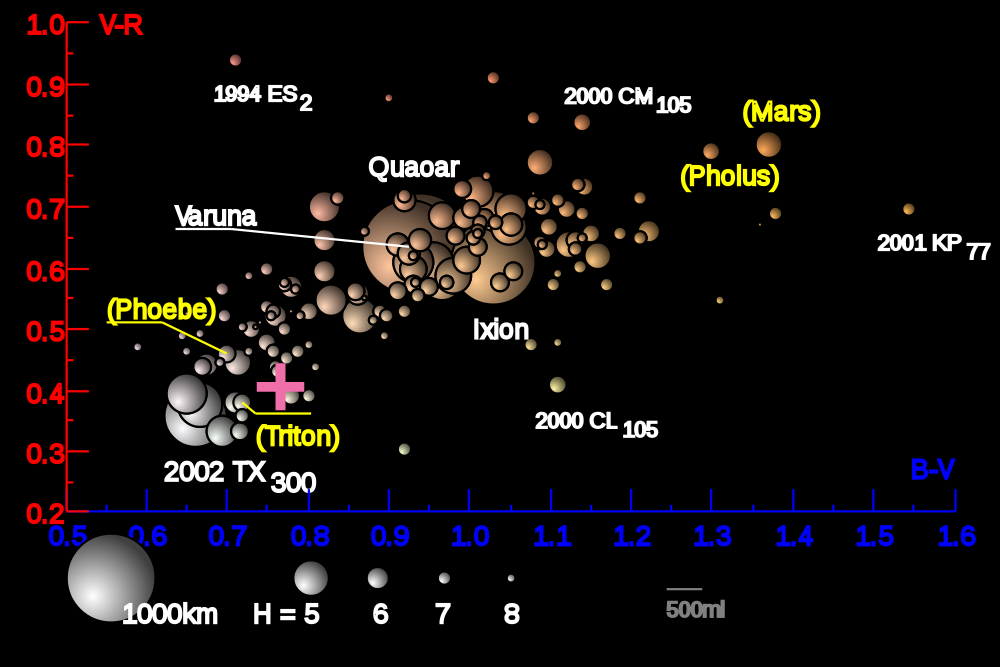
The + marks 2005 RR_{43} (B-V=0.77, V-R=0.41) on this color plot of TNOs. All the other Haumea-family members (2005 CB_{79}: 0.73, 0.37) are located to the lower left of this point.
