= (386723) 2009 YE7 =

Trans-Neptunian object

(386723) 2009 YE_{7}
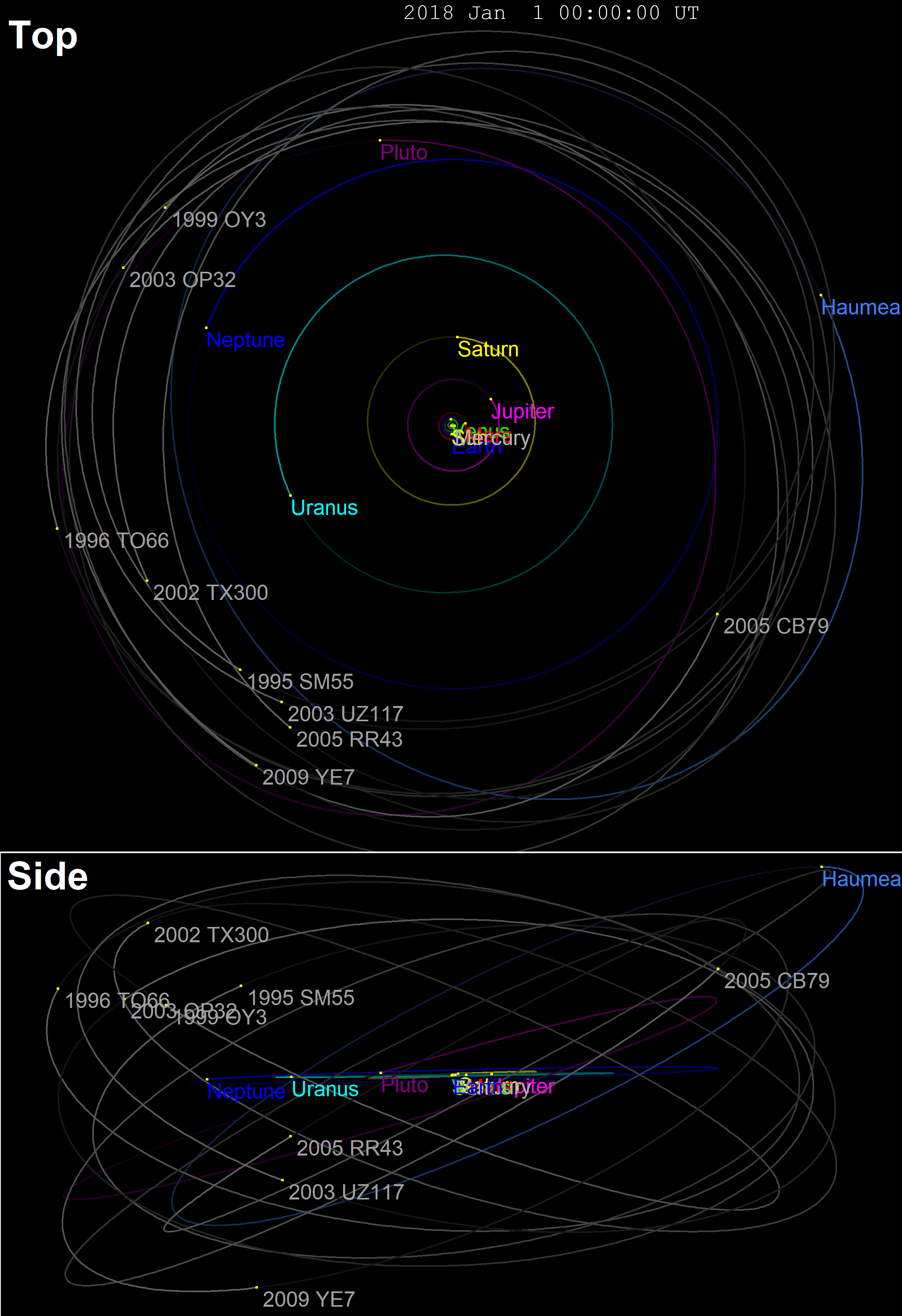
- 2009 YE_{7} among other Haumea family objects

Discovery
- Discovered by: David Rabinowitz
- Discovery date: 17 December 2009

Designations
- Minor planet category: TNO; Cubewano; Haumea family

Orbital characteristics
- Epoch 13 January 2016 (JD 2457400.5)
- Uncertainty parameter 4
- Observation arc: 2273 days (6.22 yr)
- Aphelion: 50.694 AU (7.5837 Tm)
- Perihelion: 37.893 AU (5.6687 Tm)
- Semi-major axis: 44.293 AU (6.6261 Tm)
- Eccentricity: 0.14450
- Orbital period (sidereal): 294.79 yr (107672 d)
- Mean anomaly: 180.87°
- Mean motion: 0° 0^{m} 12.037^{s} / day (n)
- Inclination: 29.080°
- Longitude of ascending node: 141.71°
- Time of perihelion: ≈ 5 May 2164 ±15 days
- Argument of perihelion: 99.077°

Physical characteristics
- Mean diameter: 200–560 km
- Geometric albedo: assume 0.7 to 0.09
- Temperature: < 44 K
- Spectral type: (Neutral)
- Apparent magnitude: ≈21.7^{(JPL Horizons)}
- Absolute magnitude (H): 4.56

(386723) 2009 YE_{7} is a trans-Neptunian object (TNO) discovered by David Rabinowitz on December 17, 2009, at the La Silla Observatory in Chile.

== Orbit ==
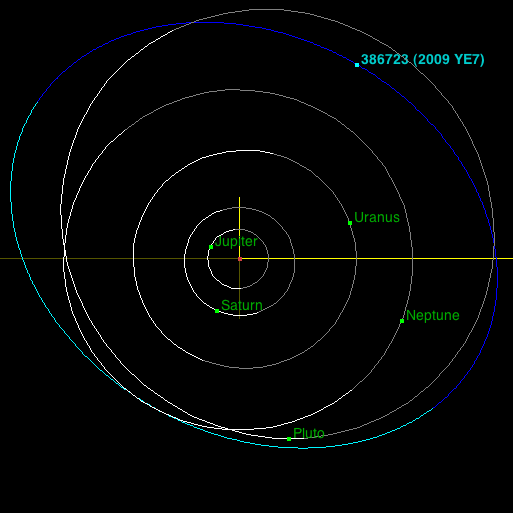
The orbit of 2009 YE_{7} compared to Pluto and Neptune

=== Classification ===
2009 YE_{7} is a classical Kuiper belt object: its orbit is not controlled by an orbital resonance with Neptune, similar to 15760 Albion, but with a much greater orbital eccentricity and inclination. It completes one orbit around the Sun in just over 247 Earth years, at an average distance of about 44 AU. It came to perihelion around 1868, and to aphelion in 2015. It is currently about 50.7 AU from the Sun, and will again return to perihelion around 2163.

=== Precovery ===
2009 YE_{7} has been observed 70 times, with precovery images dating back to 2006, and has an orbital quality code of 4.

== Physical characteristics ==
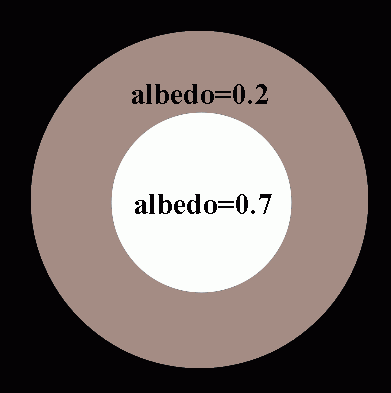
Different albedos correspond to different sizes

The size of an object can be ascertained once its absolute magnitude (H) and its albedo (the proportion of light it reflects) are known. When 2009 YE_{7} was first discovered, it was believed to have an absolute magnitude (H) of 2.8, which would have made it the first bright KBO found from the Southern Hemisphere. 2009 YE_{7} has an absolute magnitude (H) of 4.5. Since 2009 YE_{7} has an absolute magnitude dimmer than H=1, it will not be overseen by two naming committees and will not automatically be listed as a dwarf planet by the International Astronomical Union (IAU). This value would have made it the eighth-intrinsically brightest known trans-Neptunian object, but it was later found to be much dimmer. It has an absolute magnitude (H) of 4.5, which would make it a good dwarf planet candidate when using an albedo of 0.09. It is probably much smaller than previously thought, and a highly reflective icy member of the Haumea family.

2009 YE_{7} has been concluded to be a member of the Haumea family because of its Haumea-like orbit and the detection of water ice on its surface. This means 2009 YE_{7} could have an albedo of up to 0.7, resulting in a small size close to 200 kilometres (120 mi). Its actual albedo is unknown; if it turns out to be lower, it will result in a larger size estimate.

== See also ==
- (55636) 2002 TX300, brightest known Haumea-family member
