= (315530) 2008 AP129 =

Trans-Neptunian object

(315530) 2008 AP_{129}
Discovery
- Discovered by: M. E. Schwamb; M. E. Brown
- Discovery site: Palomar Obs.
- Discovery date: 11 January 2008

Designations
- Minor planet category: TNO · cubewano(?); Extended · distant

Orbital characteristics
- Epoch 2 February 2023 (JD 2460000.5)
- Uncertainty parameter 2
- Observation arc: 33.46 yr (12,220 days)
- Earliest precovery date: 9 October 1989
- Aphelion: 47.503 AU
- Perihelion: 35.837 AU
- Semi-major axis: 41.670 AU
- Eccentricity: 0.1400
- Orbital period (sidereal): 268.99 yr (98,249 d)
- Mean anomaly: 57.045°
- Mean motion: 0° 0^{m} 13.32^{s} / day
- Inclination: 27.458°
- Longitude of ascending node: 14.757°
- Argument of perihelion: 56.567°

Physical characteristics
- Dimensions: 180 km (Note: Assuming a Haumea-like albedo of 0.66); 460.81 km (calculated); 486 km 494 km
- Synodic rotation period: 9.04±0.02 h
- Geometric albedo: 0.07 (assumed); 0.09 (assumed); 0.10 (assumed)
- Spectral type: C (assumed)
- Absolute magnitude (H): 4.81 · 5.1

(315530) 2008 AP_{129} is a trans-Neptunian object and possibly a cubewano from the outermost regions of the Solar System, approximately 480 kilometers in diameter. It was discovered on 11 January 2008, by American Michael E. Brown and Megan Schwamb at Palomar Observatory in California.

== Description ==
2008 AP_{129} orbits the Sun at a distance of 35.8–47.5 AU once every 267 years and 11 months (98,249 days; semi-major axis of 41.70 AU). Its orbit has an eccentricity of 0.14 and an inclination of 27° with respect to the ecliptic. It has 3 precovery observations back to 1989. Lightcurve analysis gave an ambiguous rotation period of 9.04 hours with a brightness amplitude of 0.12 magnitude (U=2). 2008 AP_{129} has been identified as a member of the Haumea family in a dynamical study led by Proudfoot and Ragozzine in 2019.

== Origin ==
Based on their common pattern of infrared water-ice absorption and the clustering of their orbital elements, the other KBOs, it appear to be collisional fragments broken off the dwarf planet Haumea. The neutral color of the spectrum of these objects in the visible range evidences a lack of complex organics on the surface of these bodies that has been studied in detail for the surface of Haumea.

== Numbering and naming ==
This minor planet was numbered by the Minor Planet Center on 7 February 2012. As of 2025, it has not been named.
