= (24835) 1995 SM55 =

Trans-Neptunian object (TNO)

(24835) 1995 SM_{55}

Discovery
- Discovered by: N. Danzl
- Discovery site: Spacewatch; Kitt Peak National Obs.
- Discovery date: 19 September 1995

Designations
- Minor planet category: TNO; Haumea; classical; Scat-Ext; distant

Orbital characteristics
- Epoch 5 May 2025 (JD 2460800.5)
- Uncertainty parameter 2
- Observation arc: 42.31 yr (15,455 days)
- Aphelion: 46.823 AU
- Perihelion: 37.448 AU
- Semi-major axis: 42.135 AU
- Eccentricity: 0.1112
- Orbital period (sidereal): 273.51 yr (99,902 days)
- Mean anomaly: 342.25°
- Mean motion: 0° 0^{m} 13.32^{s} / day
- Inclination: 27.015°
- Longitude of ascending node: 20.974°
- Time of perihelion: ≈ 7 June 2040 ±5 days
- Argument of perihelion: 70.087°

Physical characteristics
- Dimensions: (212±4) × (184±24) × (152±20) km
- Mean diameter: 181±12 km (volume-equivalent)
- Synodic rotation period: 52.52±0.02 h or 26.26±0.01 h (ambiguous, but 52.52 h is preferred)
- Geometric albedo: 0.80±0.04
- Spectral type: BBb (suspected); C (Neutral); B–V = 0.65; V−R = 0.37±0.05; V−I = 0.710
- Absolute magnitude (H): 4.55±0.03; 4.57

(24835) 1995 SM_{55} is an icy trans-Neptunian object and member of the Haumea family that resides in the Kuiper belt, located in the outermost region of the Solar System. It was discovered on 19 September 1995, by American astronomer Nichole Danzl of the Spacewatch program at Kitt Peak National Observatory near Tucson, Arizona, in the United States.

Stellar occultation observations in 2025 show that it has a highly reflective surface and a diameter of about 200 km (120 mi). This highly reflective surface is typical for Haumea family Kuiper belt objects, which are believed to be icy fragments of the dwarf planet Haumea.

== Origin ==
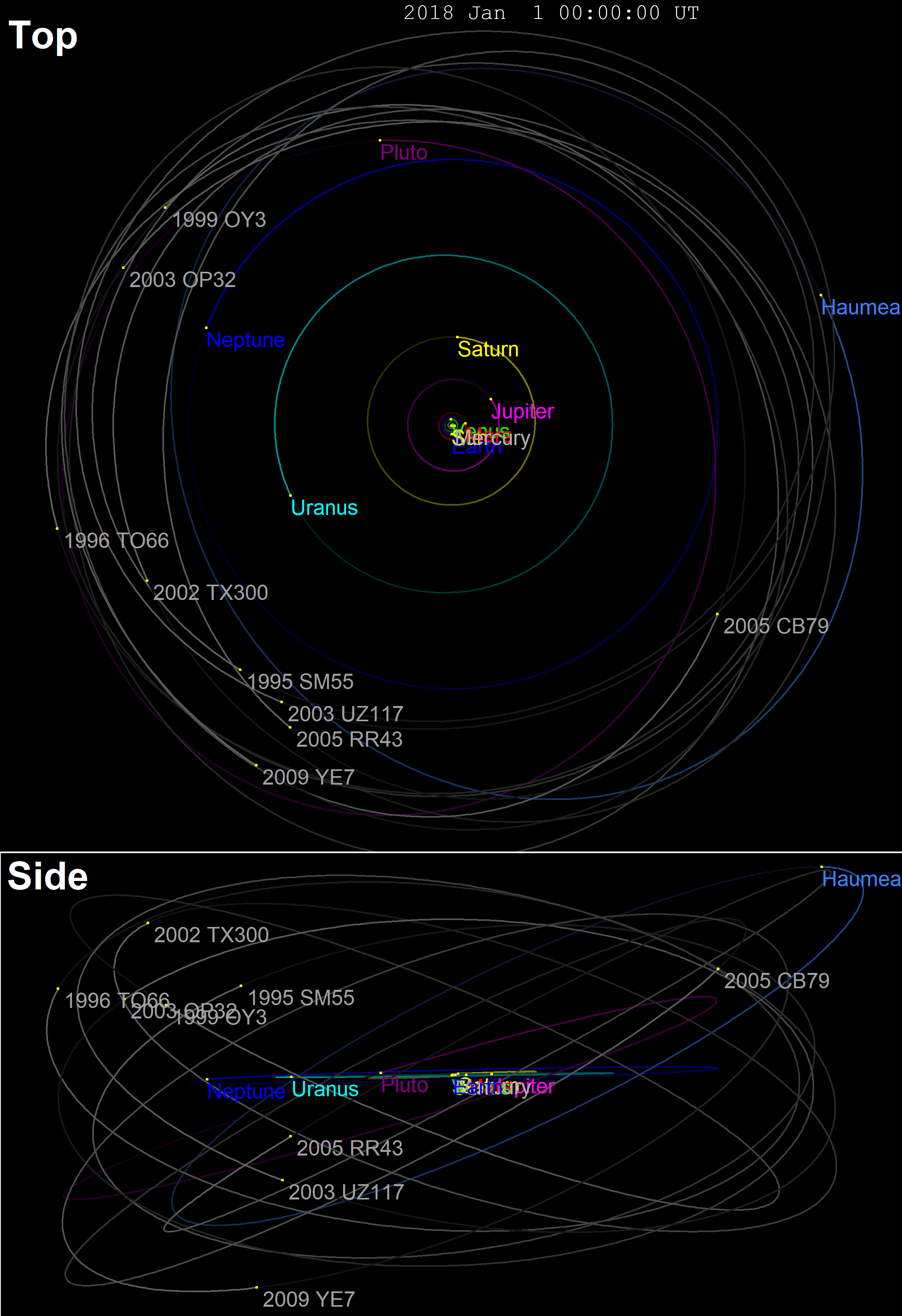
Diagram showing the orbit of 1995 SM_{55} among other members of the Haumea family (colored gray)

1995 SM_{55} has a high geometric albedo of 0.80 in visible light and a similar orbit to the dwarf planet Haumea, which means that it must be a member of the Haumea family. The Haumea family is a population of bright, water ice-rich Kuiper belt objects that are believed to have broken off from Haumea after a giant collision over 4 billion years ago. Members of the Haumea family include 1996 TO_{66}, 2002 TX_{300}, 2003 OP_{32} and 2005 RR_{43}. Based on the differences between the orbits of 1995 SM_{55} and Haumea, the object was likely ejected from the dwarf planet at a relatively high speed of 123.3 m/s.

== Physical characteristics ==
Because 1995 SM_{55} has a high albedo, it appears much brighter than other Kuiper belt objects. Because its high brightness, astronomers initially believed that 1995 SM_{55} could have a very large size, with a diameter up to 700 km (430 mi) if it had a dark, low-albedo surface. However, further analysis of 1995 SM_{55}'s thermal emission and orbit showed that it should be much smaller with a more reflective surface.

On 25 February 2024, 1995 SM_{55} passed in front of a star and occulted it. This stellar occultation was observed by numerous astronomers at 40 different locations, with 7 of them reporting positive detections of the occultation. The occultation observations revealed that 1995 SM_{55} is a roughly elliptical object that is 212 km × 184 km × 152 km (132 mi × 114 mi × 94 mi) in diameter (volume-equivalent diameter 181 km or 112 mi). The object has a high geometric albedo of 0.80±0.04.

== Naming ==
As of January 2025, this minor planet has not been named by the Minor Planet Center. Suggestions for names are open to the public.
