= (416400) 2003 UZ117 =

Trans-Neptunian object (TNO)

(416400) 2003 UZ_{117}
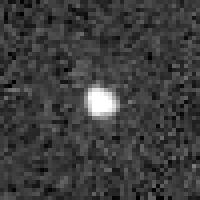
- Hubble Space Telescope image of 2003 UZ_{117} taken in 2010

Discovery
- Discovered by: Spacewatch
- Discovery site: Kitt Peak National Obs.
- Discovery date: 24 October 2003

Designations
- Minor planet category: TNO · cubewano(?) distant · Haumea; Extended

Orbital characteristics
- Epoch 4 September 2017 (JD 2458000.5)
- Uncertainty parameter 3
- Observation arc: 13.23 yr (4,831 days)
- Aphelion: 49.777 AU
- Perihelion: 38.325 AU
- Semi-major axis: 44.051 AU
- Eccentricity: 0.1300
- Orbital period (sidereal): 292.38 yr (106,791 days)
- Mean anomaly: 339.93°
- Mean motion: 0° 0^{m} 12.24^{s} / day
- Inclination: 27.473°
- Longitude of ascending node: 204.72°
- Time of perihelion: ≈ 20 November 2032 ±2 days
- Argument of perihelion: 247.45°

Physical characteristics
- Mean diameter: 222+57 −42 km
- Synodic rotation period: 6 h (poor); 10.61±0.02 h
- Geometric albedo: 0.29+0.16 −0.11
- Spectral type: BB · C
- Absolute magnitude (H): 4.92±0.01 (R) · 4.920±0.083 (R) · 5.18±0.03 · 5.22 · 5.27 · 5.27±0.02 · 5.3 · 5.4

(416400) 2003 UZ_{117} is a trans-Neptunian object and member of the Haumea family, located in the Kuiper belt in the outermost region of the Solar System. It was discovered on 24 October 2003, by astronomers of the Spacewatch survey project at Kitt Peak Observatory, Arizona. The object may also be a non-resonant cubewano.

== Orbit and physical characterization ==
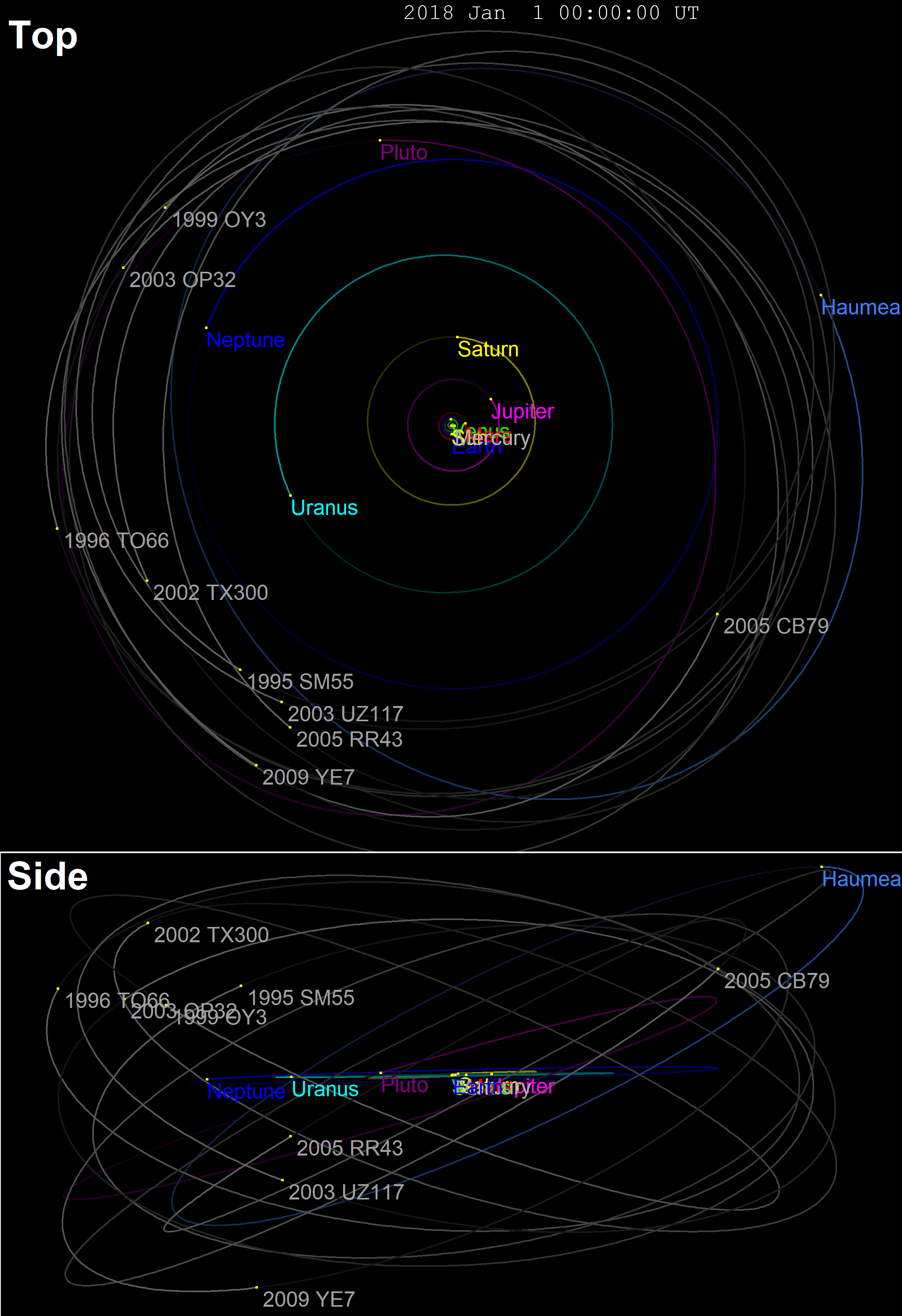
The orbit of 2003 UZ_{117} along with other Haumea family objects

2003 UZ_{117} orbits the Sun at a distance of 38.3–49.8 AU once every 292 years and 5 months (semi-major axis of 44.05 AU). Its orbit has an eccentricity of 0.13 and an inclination of 27° with respect to the ecliptic. Precovery images have been identified back to 2002.

Its diameter is around 222 km (138 mi). Two rotational lightcurves of the object gave a rotation period of 6 and 10.61 hours with a brightness amplitude of 0.1 and 0.09 in magnitude, respectively (U=1/2). It has a spectral type of BB, with a grey/blue rather than red color.

== Origin ==
Based on their common pattern of infrared water-ice absorption and the clustering of their orbital elements, 2003 UZ_{117} appears to be one of the collisional fragments broken off the dwarf planet Haumea. The neutral color of the spectrum of these objects in the visible range evidences a lack of complex organics on the surface of these bodies that has been studied in detail for the surface of Haumea.
