= (673087) 2015 AJ281 =

Trans-Neptunian object

(673087) 2015 AJ_{281}
Discovery
- Discovered by: La Silla Observatory
- Discovery date: 25 March 2011

Designations
- Alternative designations: 2011 FW_{62}
- Minor planet category: classical

Orbital characteristics
- Epoch 31 May 2020 (JD 2459000.5)
- Uncertainty parameter 3
- Aphelion: 48.835 AU (7.3056 Tm)
- Perihelion: 37.564 AU (5.6195 Tm)
- Semi-major axis: 43.199 AU (6.4625 Tm)
- Eccentricity: 0.130456
- Orbital period (sidereal): 283.94 yr (103,709 d)
- Mean anomaly: 284.586°
- Mean motion: 0° 0^{m} 12.497^{s} / day
- Inclination: 26.805°
- Longitude of ascending node: 256.130°
- Argument of perihelion: 8.233°

Physical characteristics
- Dimensions: 503 km for assumed albedo of 0.07, but likely much smaller with a higher albedo like other Haumea family members
- Absolute magnitude (H): 4.83

(673087) 2015 AJ_{281} is a magnitude-5.0 trans-Neptunian object that was discovered by La Silla Observatory on 25 March 2011 and given the provisional designation 2011 FW_{62}. Its orbital elements were very uncertain and it was lost. It was recovered on 6 January 2015 as 2015 AJ_{281}. 2015 AJ_{281} has been identified as a member of the Haumea family in a dynamical study led by Proudfoot and Ragozzine in 2019.
