= (19308) 1996 TO66 =

Trans-Neptunian object in the Kuiper belt

(19308) 1996 TO_{66}
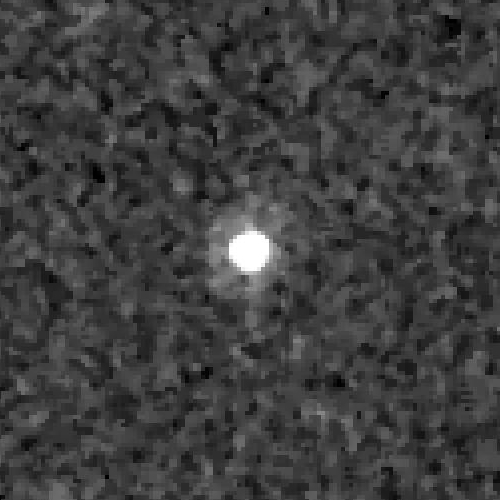
- Hubble Space Telescope image of 1996 TO_{66} taken in 2005

Discovery
- Discovered by: Chadwick Trujillo; David Jewitt; Jane Luu
- Discovery date: 12 October 1996

Designations
- Minor planet category: Haumea family; TNO; intermittent 11:19 resonance?

Orbital characteristics
- Epoch 13 January 2016 (JD 2457400.5)
- Uncertainty parameter 3
- Observation arc: 7322 days (20.05 yr)
- Aphelion: 48.375 AU (7.2368 Tm)
- Perihelion: 37.939 AU (5.6756 Tm)
- Semi-major axis: 43.157 AU (6.4562 Tm)
- Eccentricity: 0.12090
- Orbital period (sidereal): 283.52 yr (103,555 d)
- Mean anomaly: 137.16°
- Mean motion: 0° 0^{m} 12.515^{s} / day
- Inclination: 27.4948°
- Longitude of ascending node: 355.2889°
- Argument of perihelion: 239.07°
- Earth MOID: 37.0117 AU (5.53687 Tm)
- Jupiter MOID: 33.0091 AU (4.93809 Tm)

Physical characteristics
- Dimensions: 200 km (assuming a Haumea-like albedo of 0.7); (<902km)
- Synodic rotation period: 7.92 h (0.330 d)
- Sidereal rotation period: 7.92 h
- Geometric albedo: 0.7 (assumed)
- Temperature: ~43 K
- Spectral type: Neutral; B−V = 0.68, V−R = 0.39; B−V = 0.74, V−R = 0.38
- Absolute magnitude (H): 4.80

(19308) 1996 TO_{66} is a trans-Neptunian object that was discovered in 1996 by Chadwick Trujillo, David Jewitt and Jane Luu. Until 20000 Varuna was discovered, it was the second-brightest known object in the Kuiper belt, after Pluto.

In September 1998, 1996 TO_{66} was measured and was found to likely contain water ice, as well as another black/bluish material.

== Origin ==
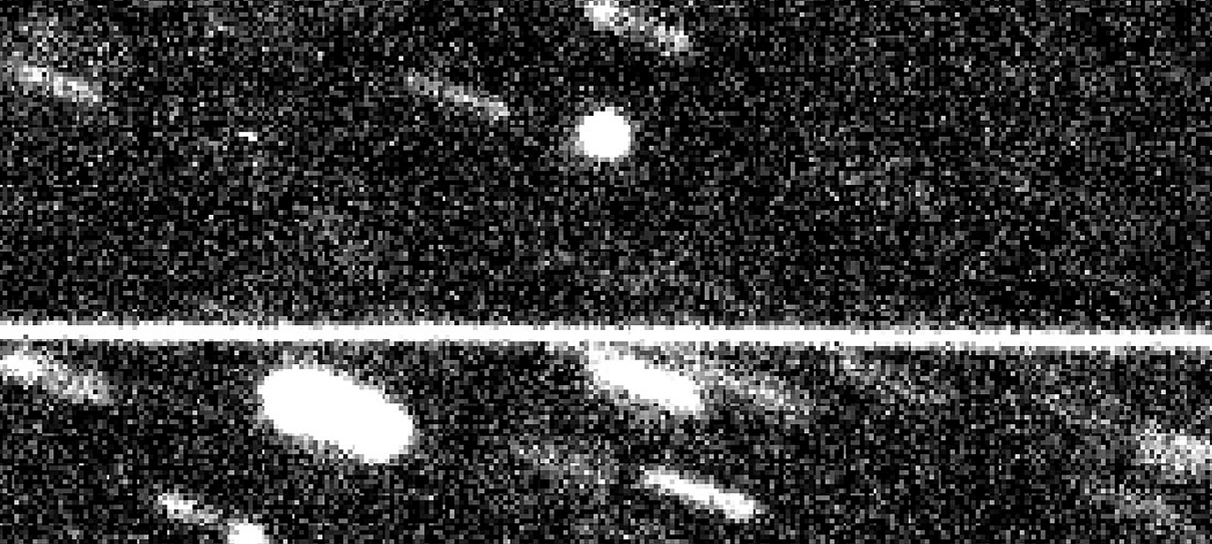
1996 TO_{66} (center top) imaged by the NTT at La Silla in 1998. Other objects are elongated due to the 4-hour-exposure. The horizontal streak is from a geostationary satellite.

Based on their common pattern of IR water-ice absorptions, neutral visible spectrum and the clustering of their orbital elements, the other KBOs (24835) 1995 SM55, (55636) 2002 TX300, (120178) 2003 OP32 and (145453) 2005 RR43 all appear to be collisional fragments broken off of the dwarf planet Haumea.

== Orbit ==
The eccentricity of 1996 TO_{66} varies between ca. 0.110 and 0.125 every 2 million years, with additional variations on the order of ± 0.01 on much shorter time scales. It is in an intermittent 19:11 resonance with Neptune. The resonance breaks every 2 million years when the eccentricity is highest and the orbit is closest to Neptune.
