= (86047) 1999 OY3 =

Kuiper belt object

(86047) 1999 OY_{3}
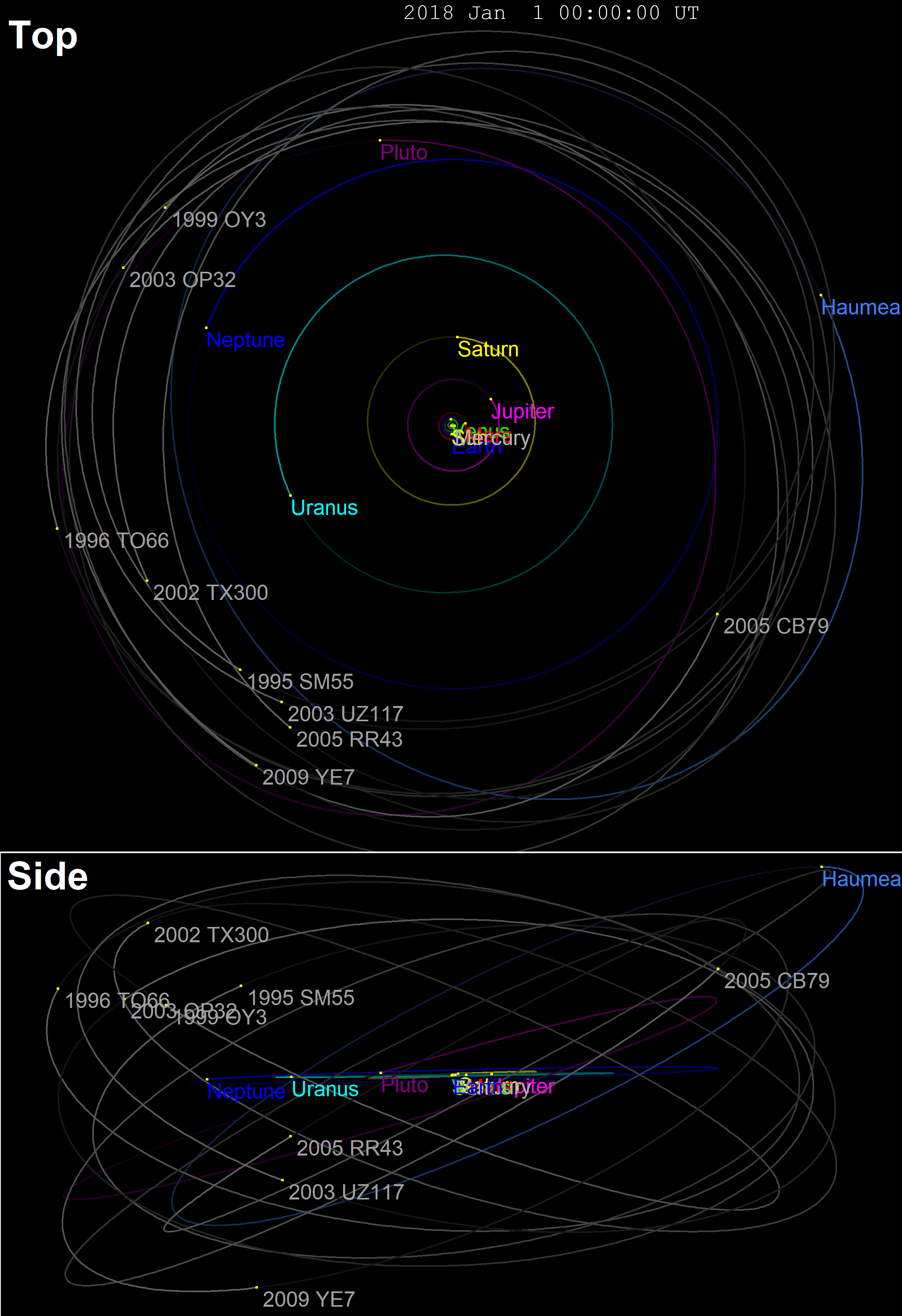
- 1999 OY_{3} among other Haumea family objects

Discovery
- Discovery date: 18 July 1999

Designations
- Minor planet category: Cubewano (MPC); Extended (DES)

Orbital characteristics
- Epoch 13 January 2016 (JD 2457400.5)
- Uncertainty parameter 3
- Observation arc: 2572 days (7.04 yr)
- Aphelion: 51.168 AU (7.6546 Tm)
- Perihelion: 36.247 AU (5.4225 Tm)
- Semi-major axis: 43.708 AU (6.5386 Tm)
- Eccentricity: 0.17069
- Orbital period (sidereal): 288.96 yr (105544 d)
- Mean anomaly: 62.419°
- Mean motion: 0° 0^{m} 12.279^{s} / day
- Inclination: 24.261°
- Longitude of ascending node: 301.85°
- Argument of perihelion: 303.74°
- Earth MOID: 35.2941 AU (5.27992 Tm)
- Jupiter MOID: 31.2837 AU (4.67997 Tm)

Physical characteristics
- Dimensions: 73 km
- Geometric albedo: 0.7 (assumed)
- Spectral type: B-V=0.75, V-R=0.26; B-V=0.71; V-R=0.37
- Absolute magnitude (H): 6.8

(86047) 1999 OY_{3} is a trans-Neptunian object that resides in the Kuiper belt beyond Pluto. It was discovered on 18 July 1999, at the Mauna Kea Observatory, Hawaii, United States.

1999 OY_{3} is a candidate member of the Haumea family and, as a result, may have a high albedo. Of the currently known Haumea family members, 1999 OY_{3} has the dimmest absolute magnitude (H) of the group at 6.8, suggesting that it is also the smallest member of the group.
