= (145453) 2005 RR43 =

Trans-Neptunian object

(145453) 2005 RR_{43}
Discovery
- Discovered by: Andrew C. Becker; Andrew W. Puckett; Jeremy M. Kubica
- Discovery site: Apache Point Obs.
- Discovery date: 9 September 2005

Designations
- Minor planet category: cubewano extended (DES)

Orbital characteristics
- Epoch 13 January 2016 (JD 2457400.5)
- Uncertainty parameter 3
- Observation arc: 14301 days (39.15 yr)
- Aphelion: 49.050 AU (7.3378 Tm)
- Perihelion: 37.276 AU (5.5764 Tm)
- Semi-major axis: 43.163 AU (6.4571 Tm)
- Eccentricity: 0.13639
- Orbital period (sidereal): 283.58 yr (103578 d)
- Average orbital speed: 0.00346°/d
- Mean anomaly: 43.576°
- Mean motion: 0° 0^{m} 12.513^{s} / day
- Inclination: 28.506°
- Longitude of ascending node: 85.852°
- Argument of perihelion: 279.66°
- Earth MOID: 36.394 AU (5.4445 Tm)
- Jupiter MOID: 32.9176 AU (4.92440 Tm)

Physical characteristics
- Mean diameter: 300+43 −34 km
- Synodic rotation period: 7.87 h (0.328 d)
- Sidereal rotation period: 7.87 h
- Geometric albedo: 0.44+0.12 −0.10
- Spectral type: B−V=0.77; V−R=0.41; B_{0}−V_{0}=0.790
- Absolute magnitude (H): 4.14; 4.0; 4.4 (per Brown)

(145453) 2005 RR_{43} is a trans-Neptunian object about 300 km (190 mi) in diameter. It belongs to the Haumea family, a group of bright, water ice-rich objects in the Kuiper belt that are believed to have fragmented off the dwarf planet Haumea. 2005 RR_{43} was discovered on 9 September 2005 by Andrew Becker, Andrew Puckett and Jeremy Kubica at Apache Point Observatory in Sunspot, New Mexico.

== History ==
=== Discovery ===
2005 RR_{43} was discovered by astronomers Andrew Becker, Andrew Puckett and Jeremy Kubica on 9 September 2005, during observations for the Sloan Digital Sky Survey. The discovery observations were made using the 2.5-meter telescope at Apache Point Observatory in Sunspot, New Mexico. The discoverers further observed 2005 RR_{43} until December 2005. The team's discovery of 2005 RR_{43} alongside several other trans-Neptunian objects was announced by the Minor Planet Center (MPC) on 31 August 2006. On the following day, the MPC reported pre-discovery detections of 2005 RR_{43} in 2001–2002 observations by Palomar Observatory's Near-Earth Asteroid Tracking program. Since then, 2005 RR_{43} has been found in even earlier observations by the Siding Spring Observatory; these include Digitized Sky Survey images from November 1976, August 1982, and October 1983.

=== Number and name ===
This object has the minor planet provisional designation 2005 RR_{43}, which was given by the MPC in the discovery announcement. The provisional designation indicates the year and half-month of the object's discovery date. 2005 RR_{43} received its permanent minor planet catalog number of 145453 from the MPC on 5 December 2006. The Kuiper belt objects 145451 Rumina and 145452 Ritona directly come before 2005 RR_{43}'s number in the minor planet catalog.

2005 RR_{43} does not have a proper name and the discoverers' privilege for naming this object expired ten years after it was numbered. According to naming guidelines by the International Astronomical Union's Working Group for Small Bodies Nomenclature, 2005 RR_{43} is open for name suggestions that relate to creation myths, as recommended for Kuiper belt objects in general.

== Origin ==
Based on their common pattern of IR water-ice absorptions, neutral visible spectrum, and the clustering of their orbital elements, the other KBOs (24835) 1995 SM55, (19308) 1996 TO66, (55636) 2002 TX300 and (120178) 2003 OP32 appear to be collisional fragments broken off the dwarf planet Haumea.

== Surface ==
The surface is covered by water ice as attested by deep absorption at 1.5 and 2 μm in the infrared spectrum and neutral (i.e. non-red) colour. Scattering models reveal that the observed water ice is, at least in a significant fraction, crystalline and organics, detected on the surface of many trans-Neptunian objects (TNOs), are completely absent. These physical and orbital characteristics common with Haumea led to suggestion that 2005 RR_{43} is a member of the Haumea collisional family. The object, together with other members of the family ((19308) 1996 TO66, (24835) 1995 SM55, (55636) 2002 TX300 and (120178) 2003 OP32), would be created from ice mantle ejected from the proto-Haumea as result of a collision with another large (around 1,660 kilometres (1,030 mi)) body.

Neutral (non-red) color index
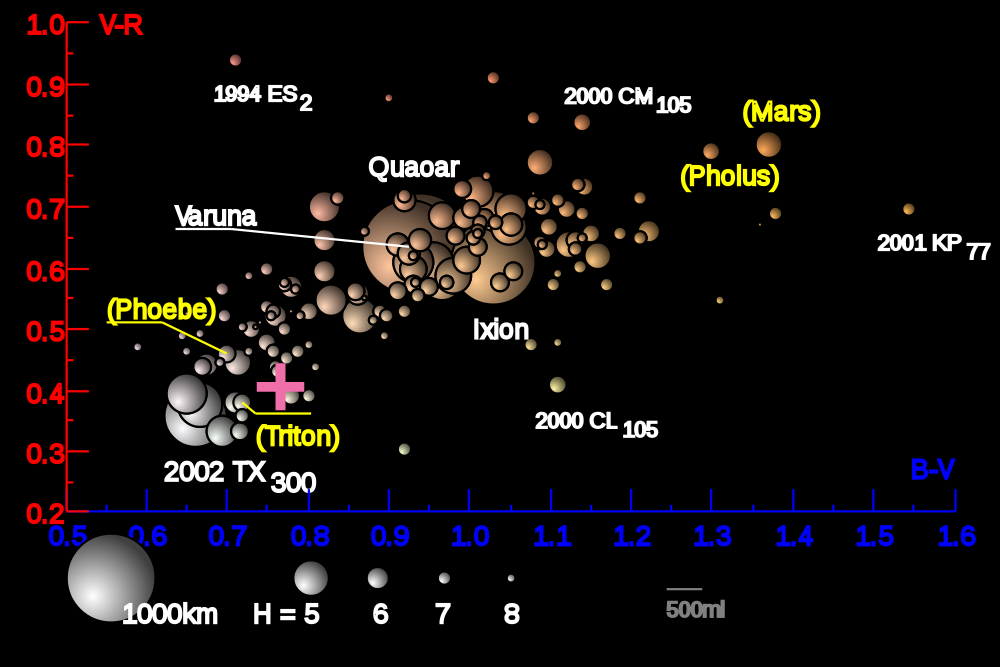
The + marks 2005 RR_{43} (B−V=0.77, V−R=0.41) on this color plot of TNOs. All the other Haumea-family members are located to the lower left of this point.
