= (139775) 2001 QG298 =

Trans-Neptunian object

(139775) 2001 QG_{298}
Discovery
- Discovered by: Marc William Buie
- Discovery date: 19 August 2001

Designations
- Minor planet category: Plutino (MPC)

Orbital characteristics
- Epoch 13 January 2016 (JD 2457400.5)
- Aphelion: 46.642 AU
- Perihelion: 31.758 AU
- Semi-major axis: 39.200 AU
- Eccentricity: 0.190
- Orbital period (sidereal): 245.43 a (89,645.031 d)
- Mean anomaly: 7.386°
- Inclination: 6.500°
- Longitude of ascending node: 162.610°
- Argument of perihelion: 309.327°

Physical characteristics
- Dimensions: 122 km
- Mean density: 0.59+0.14 −0.05 g/cm^{3} 0.56±0.02 g/cm^{3}
- Sidereal rotation period: 13.7744±0.0004 h
- Axial tilt: 90° ± 30°
- Pole ecliptic longitude: 110° ± 4° or 290° ± 4°
- Pole ecliptic latitude: −18° ± 17° or 18° ± 17°
- Geometric albedo: 0.04 (assumed)
- Spectral type: V−R = 0.60±0.02; B−V = 1.00±0.04
- Absolute magnitude (H): 6.85 (average)

(139775) 2001 QG_{298} is a trans-Neptunian object (TNO) that resides in the Kuiper belt and was discovered on 19 August 2001 by Marc William Buie at Cerro Tololo Observatory. It is classified as a plutino, which means that it is in the 3:2 mean motion resonance with Neptune.

== Orbit and classification ==
2001 QG_{298} orbits the Sun at a distance of 31.8–46.6 AU with a semi-major axis of 39.2 AU, finishing its orbit once every 245.4 years. 2001 QG_{298} is a plutino with a relatively high eccentricity of approximately 0.19 and a large inclination of 6.5° with respect to the ecliptic. It is in the 3:2 mean motion resonance with Neptune, thus, 2001 QG_{298} is classified as a plutino.

== Physical properties ==
2001 QG_{298} is a small plutino occupying the 3:2 mean motion resonance with Neptune. Its size is estimated at 122 km assuming a comet-like albedo of about 4%.

2001 QG_{298} has a double peaked light curve with a large amplitude, which has changed from 1.14 in 2003 to 0.7 in 2010. This large amplitude implies that it is actually a contact binary consisting of two elongated components of approximately equal size viewed from almost the equatorial perspective. The size of the components separated by the distance of approximately 300 km will be then about 95 km each. The density of 2001 QG_{298} should be at least 0.6–0.7 g/cm^{3} for it to remain bound.

== See also ==
- (612620) 2003 SQ317
- (612891) 2004 TT357
