= (120178) 2003 OP32 =

Trans-Neptunian object in the Haumea family

(120178) 2003 OP_{32}
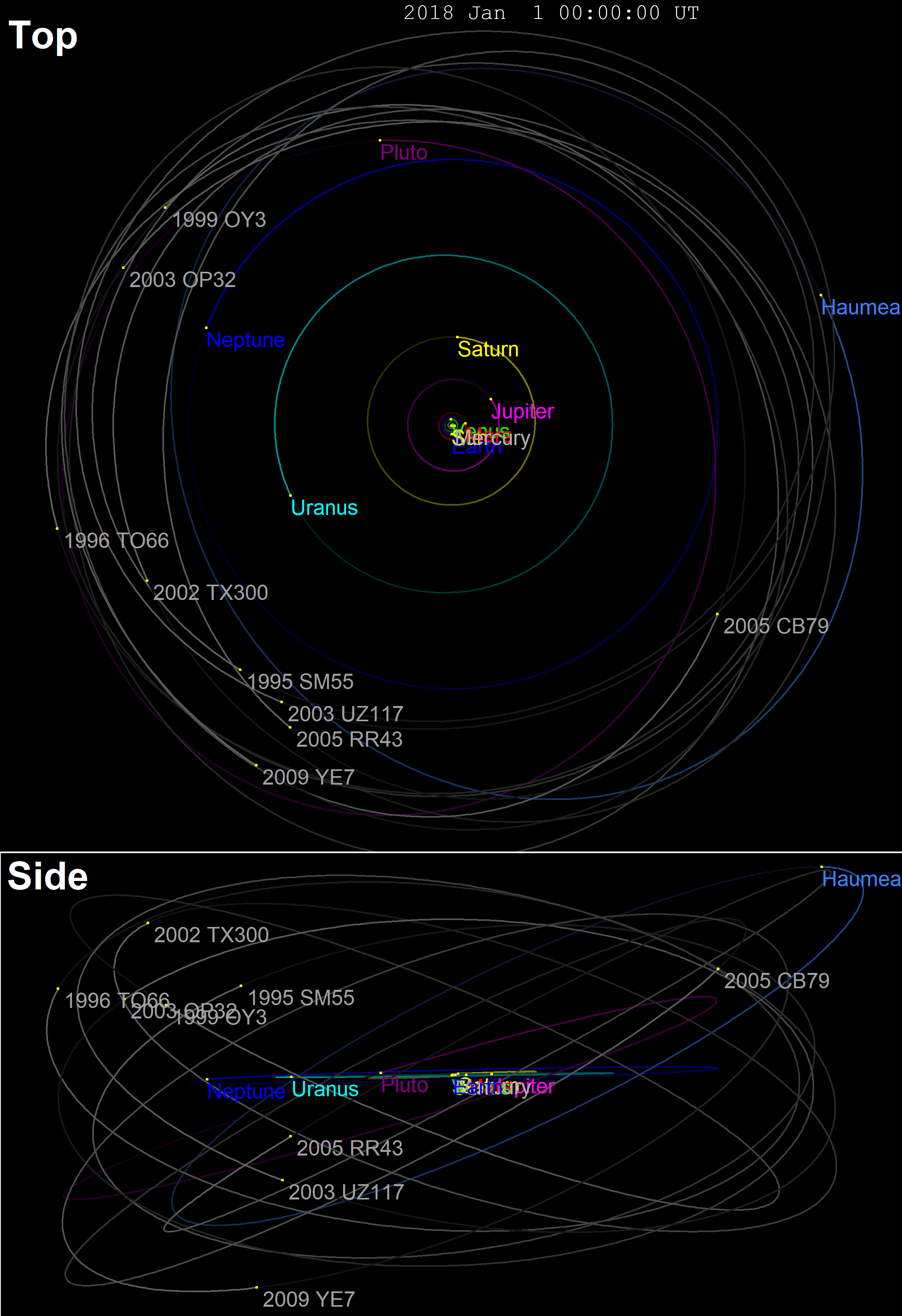
- (120178) 2003 OP_{32} among other Haumea family objects

Discovery
- Discovered by: M. E. Brown, C. Trujillo, D. Rabinowitz
- Discovery date: 26 July 2003

Designations
- Minor planet category: Cubewano (MPC); Extended (DES)

Orbital characteristics
- Epoch 13 January 2016 (JD 2457400.5)
- Uncertainty parameter 3
- Observation arc: 9205 days (25.20 yr)
- Aphelion: 47.620 AU (7.1239 Tm)
- Perihelion: 38.480 AU (5.7565 Tm)
- Semi-major axis: 43.050 AU (6.4402 Tm)
- Eccentricity: 0.10615
- Orbital period (sidereal): 282.47 yr (103172 d)
- Average orbital speed: 4.51 km/s
- Mean anomaly: 71.841°
- Mean motion: 0° 0^{m} 12.561^{s} / day
- Inclination: 27.219°
- Longitude of ascending node: 182.930°
- Argument of perihelion: 67.082°
- Jupiter MOID: 33.5815 AU (5.02372 Tm)
- T_{Jupiter}: 5.208

Physical characteristics
- Mean diameter: 274+47 −25 km
- Synodic rotation period: 9.71 h (0.405 d)
- Sidereal rotation period: 8.45 h
- Geometric albedo: 0.54+0.11 −0.15
- Temperature: ~42 K
- Spectral type: (Neutral); B−V=0.70, V-R=0.39; B_{0}-V_{0}=0.698
- Apparent magnitude: 20.31±0.03
- Absolute magnitude (H): 4.0

(120178) 2003 OP_{32} is a trans-Neptunian object (TNO) that resides in the Kuiper belt. It was discovered on 26 July 2003 by Michael E. Brown, Chad Trujillo and David L. Rabinowitz at Palomar Mountain in California.

== Origin ==
Based on their common pattern of infrared water-ice absorption and the clustering of their orbital elements, the other KBOs (24835) 1995 SM55, (19308) 1996 TO66, (55636) 2002 TX300 and (145453) 2005 RR43, among others, appear to be collisional fragments broken off the dwarf planet Haumea. The neutral color of the spectrum of these objects in the visible range evidences a lack of complex organics on the surface of these bodies that has been studied in detail for the surface of Haumea.
