= Haumea family =

Trans-Neptunian collisional family

A chart showing confirmed Haumea family members to scale (as of 2025). Unmeasured members are shown with estimated diameters using an assumed albedo of 0.7.

The Haumea or Haumean family is the only identified trans-Neptunian collisional family; that is, the only group of trans-Neptunian objects (TNOs) with similar orbital parameters and spectra that suggest they originated in the disruptive impact of a progenitor body. Statistical analysis predicts that it is probably the only trans-Neptunian collisional family.

== Members ==
The brightest members of the family would have the following diameters if they shared Haumea's albedo. However, the albedos may vary, as indicated in the next section.

Brightest Haumea-family members:
Object	(H)	Diameter if albedo=0.66	V–R
Haumea	0.14	1,500 km	0.33
2002 TX_{300}	3.51	325 km	0.36
2003 OP_{32}	3.94	270 km	0.39
2005 RR_{43}	4.15	240 km	0.41
2009 YE_{7}	4.56	200 km	
1995 SM_{55}	4.56	200 km	0.39
2005 CB_{79}	4.58	200 km	0.37
1996 TO_{66}	4.80	180 km	0.39
2008 AP_{129}	4.81	180 km	

== Characteristics ==
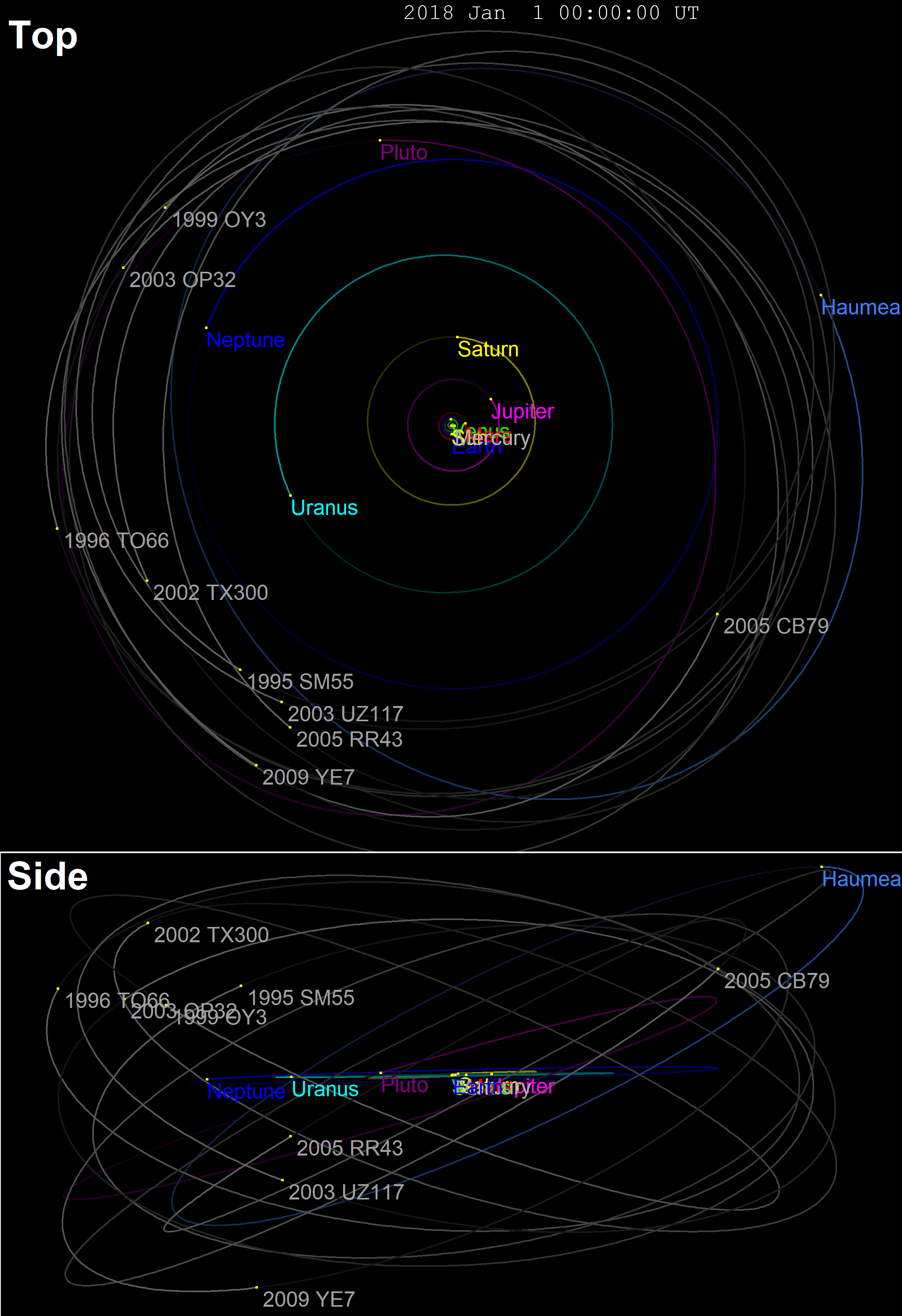
Orbits of Haumea family members, sharing semimajor axes around 43 AU, and inclinations around 27°.

The family is characterized by spectra with neutral colours and deep infrared absorption features (at 1.5 and 2.0 μm) that typical of water ice. Such features are atypical of the Kuiper belt. Haumea, thought to be a dwarf planet, is the largest member of the family and the core of the differentiated progenitor; other identified members are the moons of Haumea and other Kuiper belt objects including (55636) 2002 TX300, (24835) 1995 SM55, (19308) 1996 TO66, (120178) 2003 OP32, (145453) 2005 RR43, (86047) 1999 OY3, (416400) 2003 UZ117, (308193) 2005 CB79, (612620) 2003 SQ317 and (386723) 2009 YE7, all with an ejection velocity from Haumea of less than 150 m/s. The brightest Haumea family members have absolute magnitudes (H) bright enough to suggest a size between 400 and 700 km in diameter, and so possible dwarf planets, if they had the albedos of typical TNOs; however, they are likely to be much smaller as it is thought they are water-icy bodies with high albedos. The dispersion of the proper orbital elements of the members is a few percent or less (5% for semi-major axis, 1.4° for the inclination and 0.08 for the eccentricity). The diagram illustrates the orbital elements of the members of the family in relation to other TNOs.

=== Member orbits ===
Haumea collisional family
Name	Mean anomaly M°	Epoch	Arg.Per ω	Long Ω°	Incl i°	Ecc e	Semi-major axis a (AU)	H	Albedo
136108 Haumea	217.772	2459000.5	238.779	122.163	28.214	0.195	43.182	0.2	0.66
(19308) 1996 TO66	139.355	2459000.5	242.001	355.158	27.381	0.120	43.345	4.8	0.70
(24835) 1995 SM55	334.598	2459000.5	70.848	21.016	27.042	0.101	41.658	4.6	>0.07
(55636) 2002 TX300	77.718	2459000.5	340.338	324.409	25.832	0.126	43.270	3.4	0.88
(86047) 1999 OY3	64.735	2459000.5	306.961	301.717	24.154	0.173	44.158	6.8	0.70
(120178) 2003 OP32	72.355	2459000.5	71.889	182.016	27.135	0.109	43.496	4.0	0.70
(145453) 2005 RR43	50.329	2459000.5	278.004	85.792	28.574	0.139	43.112	4.0	0.703
(202421) 2005 UQ513 (Note: 2005 UQ_{513} displays a red spectrum unlike the rest of the Haumea family, although it dynamically belongs in the group.)	228.669	2459000.5	222.480	307.532	25.699	0.145	43.329	3.6	0.31
(308193) 2005 CB79	322.348	2459000.5	92.975	112.936	28.692	0.142	43.212	4.6	0.70
(315530) 2008 AP129	53.949	2459000.5	56.289	14.875	27.419	0.136	41.546	4.7	
(386723) 2009 YE7	183.830	2459000.5	101.182	141.381	29.114	0.147	44.203	4.3	0.70
(416400) 2003 UZ117	344.334	2459000.5	246.134	204.629	27.429	0.129	44.031	5.1	0.07
(523645) 2010 VK201	171.302	2459000.5	89.649	156.308	28.839	0.116	43.091	5.0	
(543454) 2014 HZ199	66.295	2459000.5	85.268	57.101	27.835	0.154	43.249	5.0	
(612620) 2003 SQ317	11.059	2459000.5	191.080	176.268	28.537	0.082	42.736	6.6	0.05–0.5
(653589) 2014 QW441	1.117	2459000.5	202.336	162.681	28.761	0.106	44.449	5.2	
(671467) 2014 LO28	313.026	2459000.5	104.587	287.074	25.535	0.121	43.219	5.3	
(673087) 2015 AJ281	284.578	2459000.5	8.239	256.130	26.805	0.130	43.199	5.0	

Proudfoot et al. (2024) identify five additional members: (471954) 2013 RM98, (499514) 2010 OO127, (523736) 2014 QA442, (523789) 2015 FN345 and (728767) 2010 RF64.

=== Resonances with Neptune ===
The current orbits of the members of the family cannot be accounted for by the formational collision alone. To explain the spread of the orbital elements, an initial velocity dispersion of ≈ 400 m/s is required, but such a velocity spread should have dispersed the fragments much further. This problem applies only to Haumea itself; the orbital elements of all the other objects in the family require an initial velocity dispersion of just ≈ 140 m/s. To explain this mismatch in the required velocity dispersion, Brown and colleagues suggest that Haumea initially had orbital elements closer to those of the other members of the family and its orbit (especially the orbital eccentricity) changed after the collision. Unlike the other members of the family, Haumea is in an intermittent 7:12 resonance with Neptune, which could have increased Haumea's eccentricity to its current value.

The Haumea family occupies a region of the Kuiper belt where multiple resonances (including the 3:5, 4:7, 7:12, 10:17 and 11:19 mean motion resonances) interact, leading to the orbital diffusion of that collision family. Beside the intermittent 7:12 resonance currently occupied by Haumea itself, other members of the family occupy some of the other resonances, and resonance hopping (switching from one resonance to another) is possible on a time scale of hundreds of millions of years. (19308) 1996 TO66, the first member of the Haumea family to be discovered, is currently in an intermittent 11:19 resonance.

== Formation and evolution ==
The collisional family of Haumea (in green), other classical KBOs (blue), plutinos and other resonant objects (red) and SDOs (grey). Radius is semi-major axis, angle orbital inclination.

Collisional formation of the family requires a progenitor some 1660 km in diameter, with a density of ~2.0 g/cm^{3}, similar to the densities of Pluto and Eris. During the formational collision, Haumea lost roughly 20% of its mass. Because that mass was mostly ice from the outer layers of a differentiated body, the remaining object was denser.

In addition to the effects of resonances with Neptune, there may be other complications in the origin of the family. It has been suggested that the material ejected in the initial collision may have coalesced into a large moon of Haumea, which gradually increased its distance from Haumea through tidal evolution, and was then later shattered in a second collision, dispersing its shards outwards. This second scenario produces a velocity dispersion of ~190 m/s, considerably closer to the measured ~140 m/s velocity dispersion of the family members; it also avoids the difficulty of the observed ~140 m/s dispersion being much less than the ~900 m/s escape velocity of Haumea. Haumea may not be the only elongated, rapidly rotating, large object in the Kuiper belt. In 2002, Jewitt and Sheppard suggested that Varuna should be elongated, based on its rapid rotation. In the early history of the Solar System, the trans-Neptunian region would have contained many more objects than it does at present, increasing the likelihood of collisions between objects. Gravitational interaction with Neptune has since scattered many objects out of the Kuiper belt to the scattered disc.

The presence of the collisional family hints that Haumea and its "offspring" might have originated in the scattered disc. In today's sparsely populated Kuiper belt, the chance of such a collision occurring over the age of the Solar System is less than 0.1 percent. The family could not have formed in the denser primordial Kuiper belt because such a close-knit group would have been disrupted by Neptune's subsequent migration into the belt, which is thought to have been the cause of its current low density. Therefore, it appears likely that the dynamic scattered disc region, in which the possibility of such a collision is far higher, is the place of origin for the object which would become Haumea and its kin. Simulations suggest the probability of one such family in the Solar System is approximately 50%, so it is possible that the Haumea family is unique.

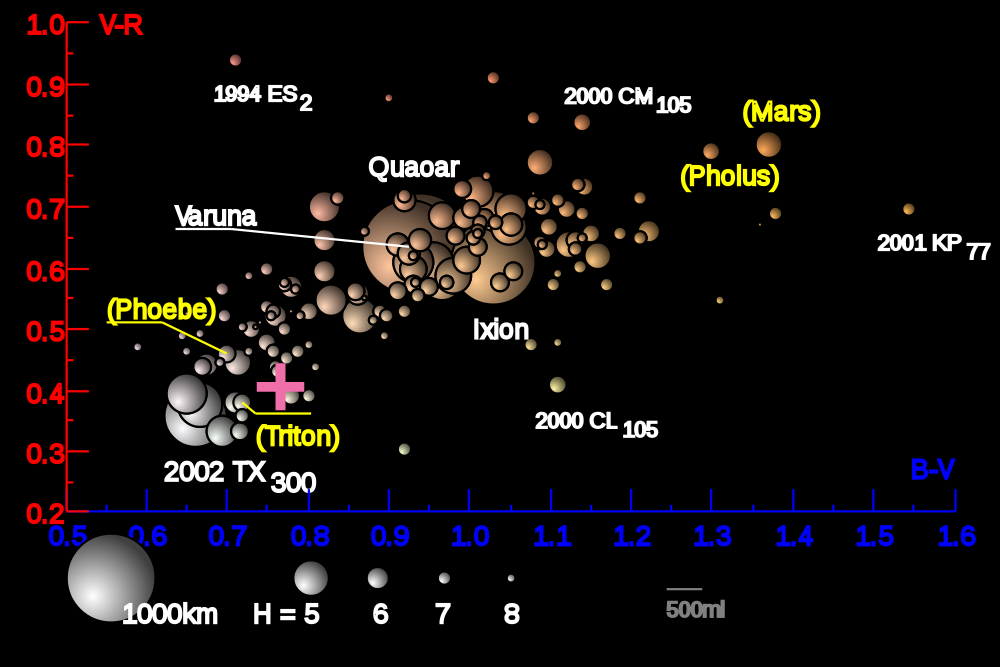
The + marks 2005 RR_{43} (B−V=0.77, V−R=0.41) on this color plot of TNOs. All the other Haumea-family members are located to the lower left of this point.

Because it would have taken at least a billion years for the group to have diffused as far as it has, the collision that created the Haumea family is thought to have occurred very early in the Solar System's history. This conflicts with the findings of Rabinowitz and colleagues who found in their studies of the group that their surfaces were remarkably bright; their colour suggests that they have recently (i.e. within the last 100 million years) been resurfaced by fresh ice. Over a timescale as long as a billion years, energy from the Sun would have reddened and darkened their surfaces, and no plausible explanation has been found to account for their apparent youth.

However, more detailed studies of the visible and near infrared spectrum of Haumea show it is a homogeneous surface covered by an intimate 1:1 mixture of amorphous and crystalline ice, together with no more than 8% organics. This high amount of amorphous ice on the surface confirms that the collisional event must have happened more than 100 million years ago. This result agrees with the dynamical studies and discards the assumption that the surfaces of these objects are young.

== See also ==
- Asteroid family
