= Spectral slope =

In astrophysics and planetary science, spectral slope, also called spectral gradient, is a measure of dependence of the reflectance on the wavelength.

In digital signal processing, it is a measure of how quickly the spectrum of an audio sound tails off towards the high frequencies, calculated using a linear regression.

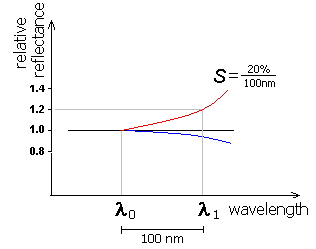
Illustration of the spectral slope

== Spectral slope in astrophysics and planetary science ==
The visible and infrared spectrum of the reflected sunlight is used to infer physical and chemical properties of the surface of a body. Some objects are brighter (reflect more) in longer wavelengths (red). Consequently, in visible light they will appear redder than objects showing no dependence of reflectance on the wavelength.

The diagram illustrates three slopes:

- a red slope, the reflectance is increasing with the wavelengths
- flat spectrum (in black)
- And a blue slope, the reflectance actually diminishing with the wavelengths

The slope (spectral gradient) is defined as:

$$S = \frac{R_{F_1}-R_{F_0}}{\lambda_1 - \lambda_0}$$

where $R_{F_0}, R_{F_1}$ is the reflectance measured with filters F_{0}, F_{1} having the central wavelengths λ_{0} and λ_{1}, respectively.

The slope is typically expressed in percentage increase of reflectance (i.e. reflexivity) per unit of wavelength: %/100 nm (or % /1000 Å)

The slope is mostly used in near infrared part of the spectrum while colour indices are commonly used in the visible part of the spectrum.

The trans-Neptunian object Sedna is a typical example of a body showing a steep red slope (20%/100 nm) while Orcus' spectrum appears flat in near infra-red.

== Spectral slope in audio ==
The spectral "slope" of many natural audio signals (their tendency to have less energy at high frequencies) has been known for many years, and the fact that this slope is related to the nature of the sound source. One way to quantify this is by applying linear regression to the Fourier magnitude spectrum of the signal, which produces a single number indicating the slope of the line-of-best-fit through the spectral data.

Alternative ways to characterise a sound signal's distribution of energy vs. frequency include spectral rolloff, spectral centroid.

== Animals that can sense spectral slope ==
The dung beetle can see the spectral gradient of the sky and polarised light, and they used this to navigate. Desert ants Cataglyphis use the polarization and spectral skylight gradients to navigate.

== See also ==
- Roll-off
