= Gravitational scattering =

Alteration of orbits of celestial bodies through gravity

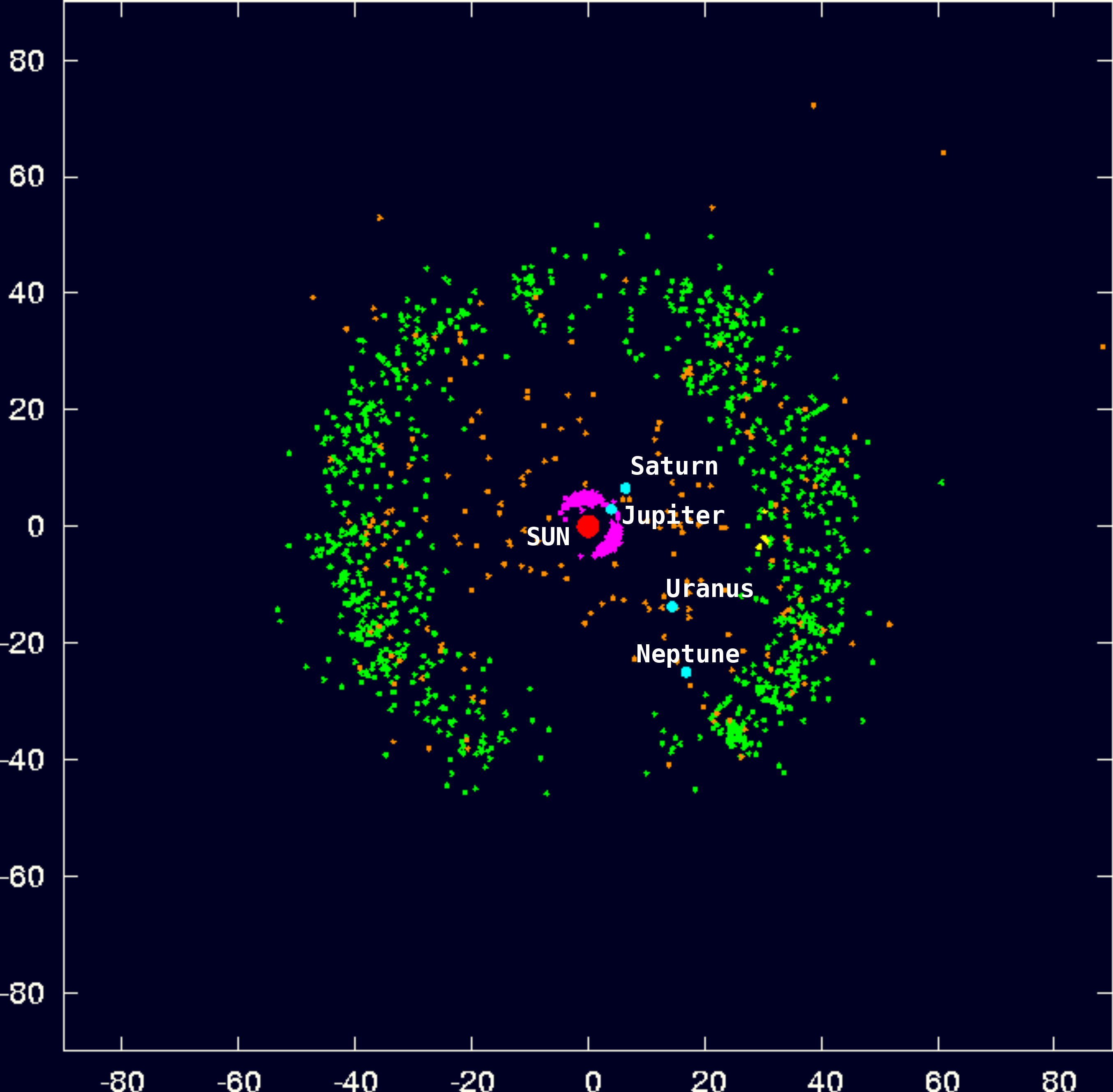
The Kuiper belt (green), in the Solar System's outskirts.

Gravitational scattering is the alteration of trajectories when two or more celestial objects exchange energy and momentum through close gravitational encounters. This process underpins many dynamical phenomena in astrophysics, from the formation of binary star systems to the ejection of bodies from planetary systems. When objects like stars, planets, or black holes pass close enough to influence each other’s motions, their paths can shift dramatically. Close passages between massive objects—such as stars, planets, or black holes—can produce either bound pairs or unbound ejecta. An example is Jupiter scattering Kuiper belt objects out of the Solar System.

== Observing gravitational scattering ==
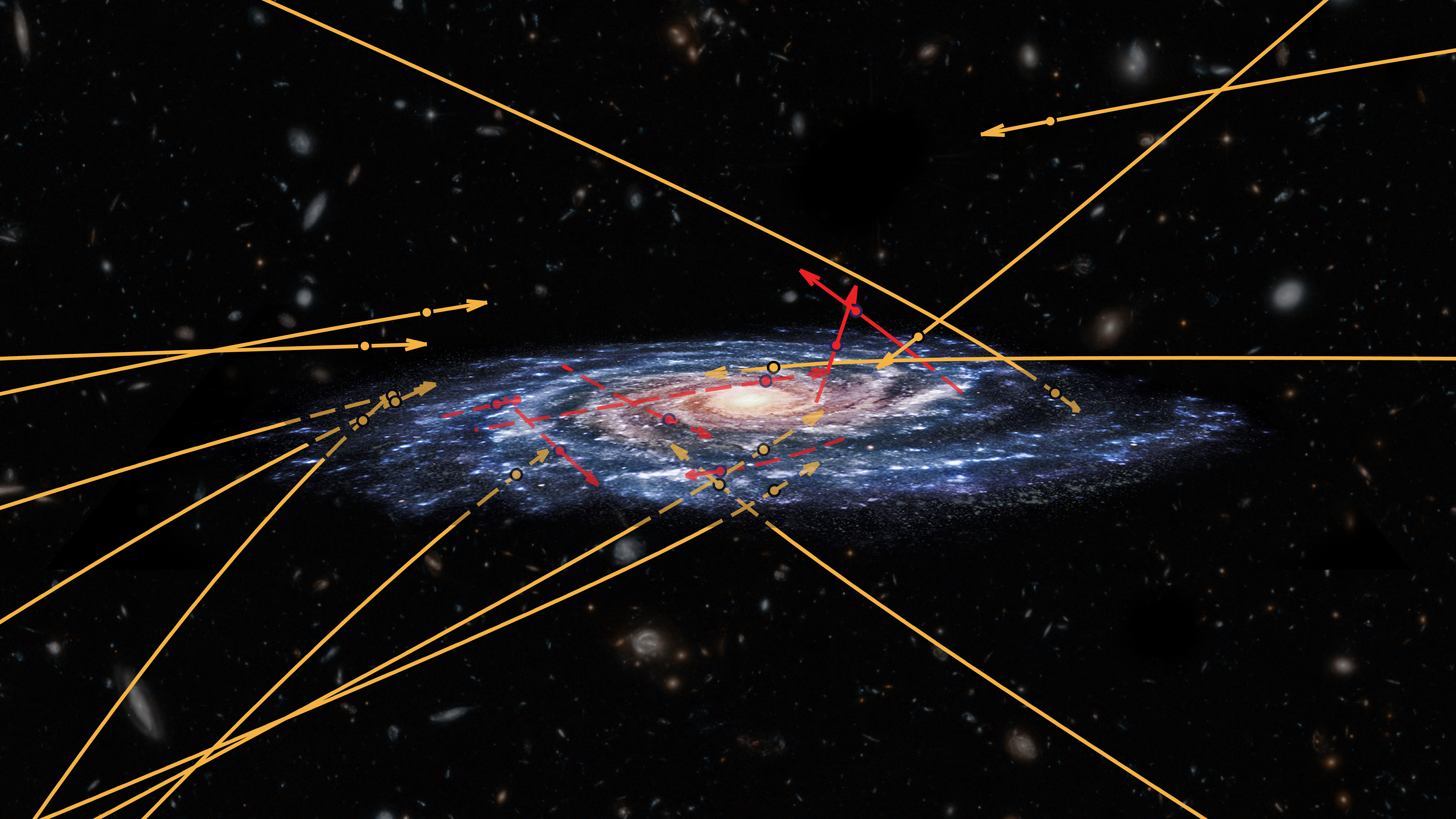
Positions and trajectories of 20 high-velocity stars, reconstructed from Gaia data, overlaid on an artistic view of the Milky Way

Researchers investigate gravitational scattering events with N-body simulations and other numerical models of gravitational fields and gravitational field interactions. A key aspect is the exchange of energy and momentum between the bodies. For example, a fast body can impart kinetic energy to a slower one, producing the slingshot effect exploited by spacecraft during gravitational-assist flybys.

Observational evidence of scattering clarifies several astrophysical problems, from stellar-cluster evolution to galaxy-core dynamics. In dense regions such as star clusters, scattering influences star formation rates and the spatial distribution of stellar populations. Hypervelocity stars are thought to originate when massive black holes scatter binary stars at galactic centers. Close encounters between compact objects can emit gravitational waves, which have been detected by observatories such as the Laser Interferometer Gravitational-Wave Observatory (LIGO). Analyses employ both Newtonian mechanics and general relativity; the relativistic framework is essential for high-mass or high-speed encounters.

== Gravitational scattering impacts ==
Gravitational scattering can alter orbits and in extreme cases can eject celestial bodies from their native planetary systems. One mechanism for shifting planets to wider orbits is scattering by massive neighbours; within a protoplanetary disk, similar kicks can arise from dense gas clumps. In the Solar System, Uranus and Neptune may have been pushed outward after close encounters with Jupiter or Saturn. After the protoplanetary gas dissipates, multi-planet systems can experience comparable instabilities: orbits shift, and some planets are eventually ejected or spiral into the host star.

Planets scattered gravitationally can end on highly eccentric orbits with perihelia close to the star, enabling their orbits to be altered by the gravitational tides they raise on the star. The eccentricities and inclinations of these planets are also excited during these encounters, providing one possible explanation for the observed eccentricity distribution of the closely orbiting exoplanets. The resulting systems are often near the limits of stability. As in the Nice model, systems of exoplanets with an outer disk of planetesimals can also undergo dynamical instabilities following resonance crossings during planetesimal-driven migration. The eccentricities and inclinations of the planets on distant orbits can be damped by dynamical friction with the planetesimals with the final values depending on the relative masses of the disk and the planets that had gravitational encounters.

== See also ==
- Celestial mechanics
- Planetary migration
- Three-body problem
- Stellar dynamics
- Stellar kinematics
