= (55636) 2002 TX300 =

Haumea family Kuiper belt object

(55636) 2002 TX_{300}
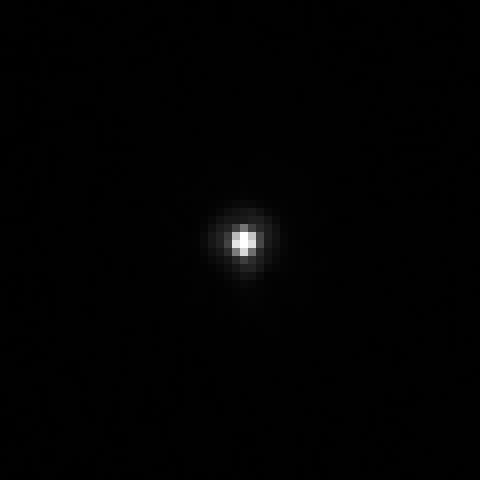
- 2002 TX_{300} imaged by the Hubble Space Telescope on 16 September 2005

Discovery
- Discovered by: NEAT
- Discovery site: Palomar Obs.
- Discovery date: 15 October 2002

Designations
- Minor planet category: TNO; classical (hot); Haumea family; distant; Scat-Ext

Orbital characteristics (barycentric) (Note: These orbital elements are expressed in terms of the Solar System Barycenter (SSB) as the frame of reference. Due to planetary perturbations, the Sun revolves around the SSB at non-negligible distances, so heliocentric-frame orbital elements and distances can vary in short timescales as shown in JPL-Horizons.)
- Epoch 5 May 2025 (JD 2460800.5)
- Uncertainty parameter 0
- Observation arc: 70+ yr
- Earliest precovery date: 27 August 1954
- Aphelion: 48.587 AU
- Perihelion: 37.919 AU
- Semi-major axis: 43.253 AU
- Eccentricity: 0.1233
- Orbital period (sidereal): 284.28 yr (103,832 d)
- Mean anomaly: 84.179°
- Mean motion: 0° 0^{m} 12.482^{s} / day
- Inclination: 25.853°
- Longitude of ascending node: 324.578°
- Time of perihelion: ≈ 24 June 2242
- Argument of perihelion: 340.302°
- Known satellites: 0

Physical characteristics
- Mean diameter: 320±50 km (2019); 323+95 −37 km (2018)
- Mass: ≈1.1×10^{19} kg (est. water ice density)
- Mean density: ≈1 g/cm^{3} (assumed water ice)
- Sidereal rotation period: 8.04±0.04 h (single-peaked) (Note: The rotation period of 2002 TX_{300} was measured by observing how its brightness changes over time, which is plotted as a light curve. If 2002 TX_{300} has a spheroidal shape, then its light curve should resemble a "single-peaked" sine wave, whereas if 2002 TX_{300} is elongated, then its light curve should resemble a "double-peaked" sine wave.); or 16.08±0.04 h (double-peaked)
- Geometric albedo: 0.65±0.15 (2020); 0.76+0.18 −0.45 (2018)
- Temperature: 49 K (subsolar)
- Spectral type: BBb (neutral) (Note: The trans-Neptunian object spectral type "BBb" indicates the object has both a "spectrally neutral" color (BB) and a high albedo (b).); B–V = 0.70±0.09; V–R = 0.36±0.02; V–I = 0.68±0.12
- Apparent magnitude: 19 to 20
- Absolute magnitude (H): 3.574±0.055; 3.51 (JPL)
- Angular diameter: 5 milliarcseconds

(55636) 2002 TX_{300} is an icy trans-Neptunian object orbiting the Sun in the Kuiper belt. It has a diameter of about 320 km (200 mi) and a highly reflective surface made of fresh water ice. It is the brightest and possibly the largest known member of the Haumea family, a population of Kuiper belt objects that broke off from the dwarf planet Haumea 4.4 billion years ago.

2002 TX_{300} was discovered on 15 October 2002 by the NASA-directed Near-Earth Asteroid Tracking (NEAT) survey at Palomar Observatory. When it was discovered, astronomers initially inferred from its high brightness that it could be a large dwarf planet almost 1,000 km (620 mi) in diameter. This was later disproven in October 2009, when astronomers measured the diameter of 2002 TX_{300} for the first time by observing the object occulting or blocking out the light of a background star. 2002 TX_{300} is now known to be too small to likely qualify as a dwarf planet, and its brightness mainly comes from its reflective surface. 2002 TX_{300} was the first Kuiper belt object (besides Pluto and its moon Charon) that was observed via stellar occultation.

== History ==
=== Discovery ===
2002 TX_{300} was discovered on 15 October 2002 by the Near-Earth Asteroid Tracking (NEAT) survey, which was a NASA-directed project for finding near-Earth asteroids in the sky using telescopes at various observatories across the United States. The telescope that discovered 2002 TX_{300} was the 1.22-meter (48 in) Samuel Oschin telescope at Palomar Observatory in San Diego County, California. The people involved in making the discovery observations at Palomar included Eleanor Helin, Steven Pravdo, Kenneth Lawrence, Michael D. Hicks, and R. Thicksten. Additional confirming observations were provided by Powell Observatory, Table Mountain Observatory, and Stephen P. Laurie at Church Stretton (obs. code 966) during the three days following the discovery of 2002 TX_{300}.

The Minor Planet Center (MPC) announced the discovery of 2002 TX_{300} on 22 Oct 2002. Within a day after the announcement, astronomer Reiner Stoss found pre-discovery observations of 2002 TX_{300} in NEAT images from 2001 to 2002 and Digitized Sky Survey images from 1954 to 1995. The earliest known pre-discovery observation of 2002 TX_{300} came from Siding Spring Observatory images taken on 27 August 1954.

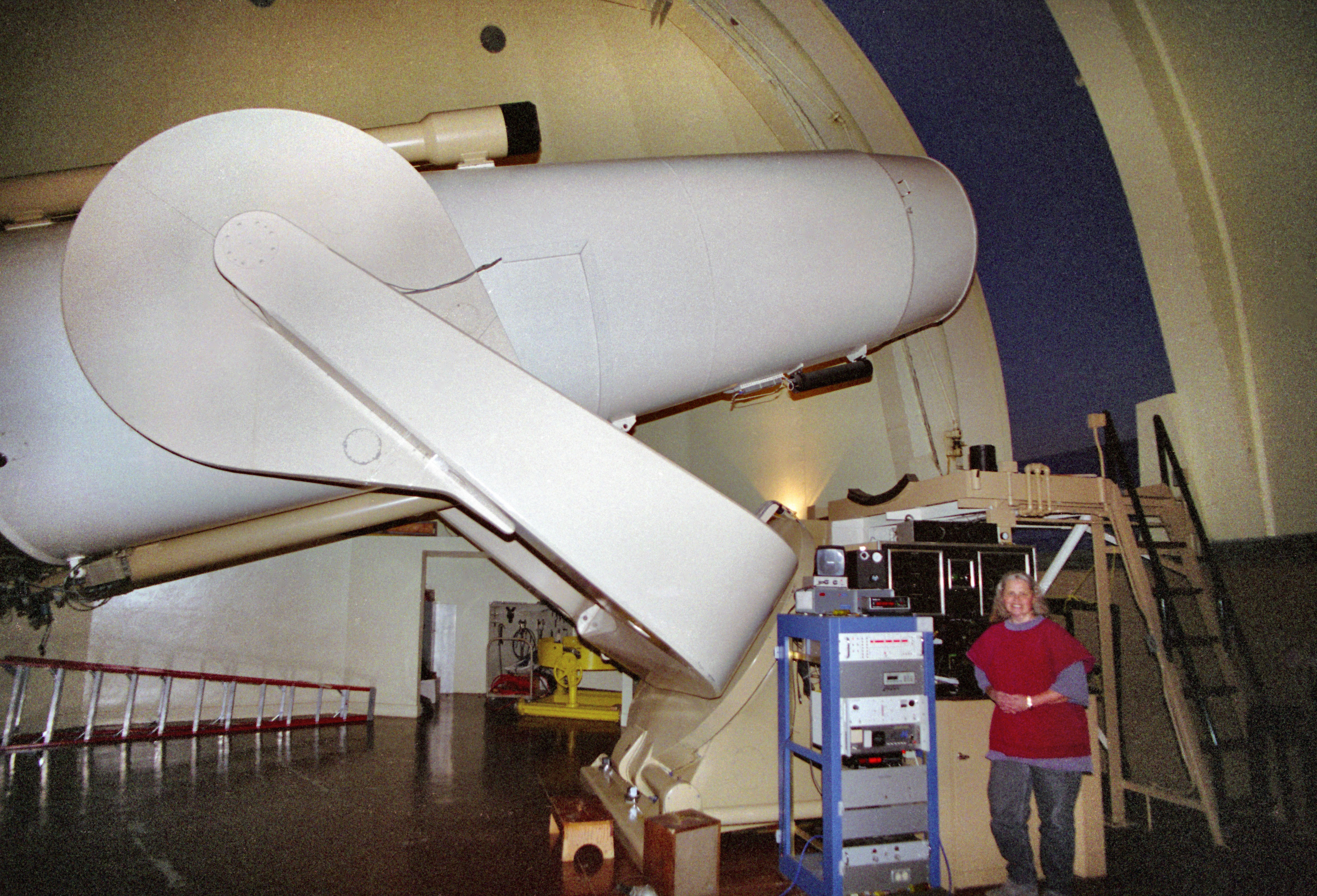
The 1.2-meter Samuel Oschin telescope that discovered 2002 TX_{300} at Palomar Observatory

Discovery images of 2002 TX_{300} from 15 October 2002

=== Number and name ===
This object has the minor planet provisional designation 2002 TX_{300}, which was given by the MPC in the discovery announcement. The provisional designation indicates the year and half-month of the object's discovery date. 2002 TX_{300} received its permanent minor planet catalog number of 55636 from the MPC on 16 February 2003. The Kuiper belt objects 55637 Uni and (55638) 2002 VE95 directly come after (55636) 2002 TX_{300}'s number in the minor planet catalog.

2002 TX_{300} does not have a proper name and the discoverers' privilege for naming this object expired ten years after it was numbered. According to naming guidelines by the International Astronomical Union's Working Group for Small Bodies Nomenclature, 2002 TX_{300} is open for name suggestions that relate to creation myths, as recommended for Kuiper belt objects in general.

== Orbit and classification ==
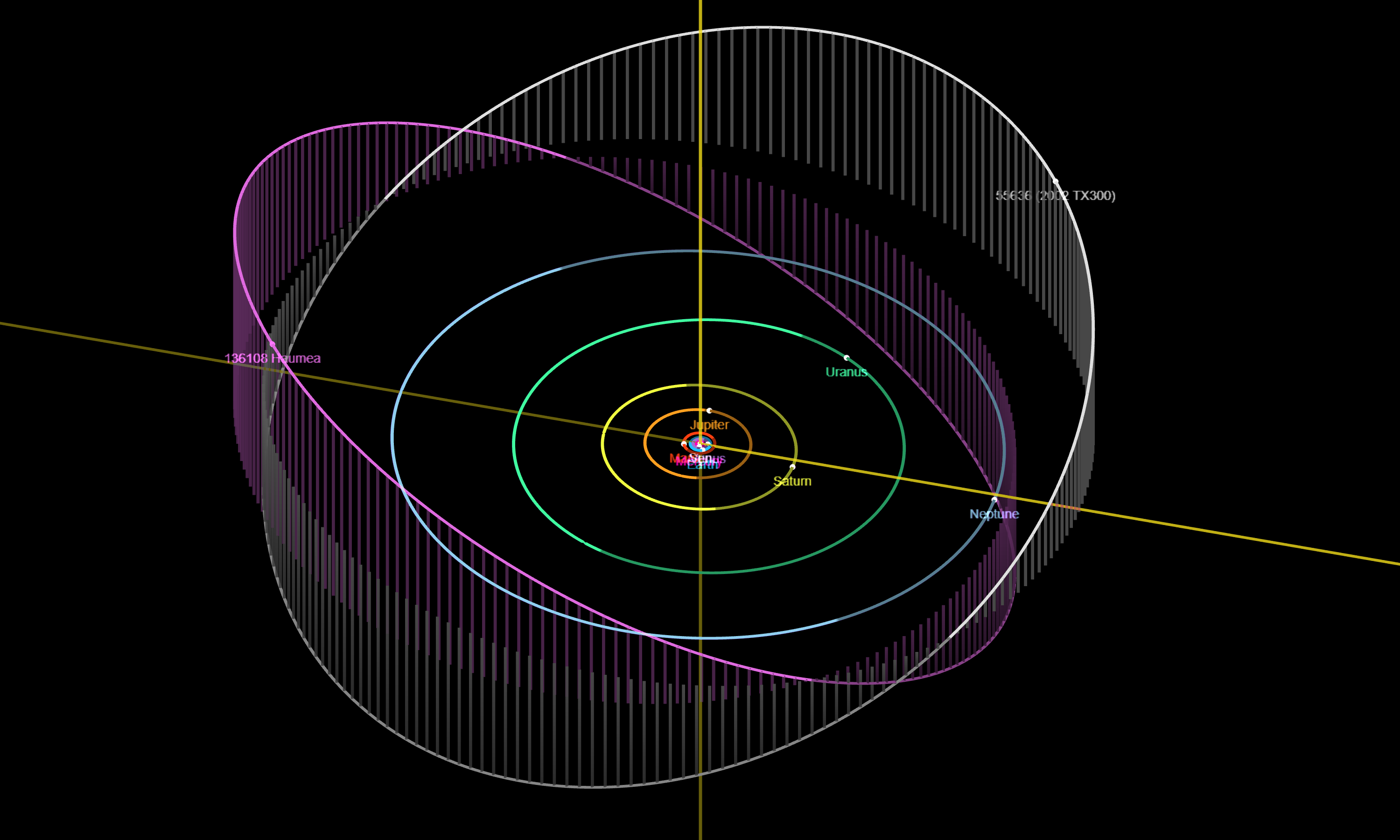
Diagram showing an oblique view of the orbits of 2002 TX_{300} (white), Haumea (pink), and the planets. Rows of dark vertical lines along the inclined orbits of 2002 TX_{300} and Haumea indicate their vertical distances above or below the ecliptic plane.

2002 TX_{300} is a trans-Neptunian object (TNO) orbiting the Sun at a semi-major axis or average distance of 43.3 astronomical units (AU). It follows an elliptical orbit that has an eccentricity of 0.12 and a high inclination of 25.9° with respect to the ecliptic. In its 284-year-long orbit, 2002 TX_{30} comes as close as 37.9 AU from the Sun at perihelion and as far as 48.6 AU from the Sun at aphelion. 2002 TX_{300} last passed perihelion in February 1952 and will make its next perihelion passage on 24 June 2242.

2002 TX_{300} is located in the classical region of the Kuiper belt 39–48 AU from the Sun, and is thus classified as a classical Kuiper belt object (sometimes known as a "cubewano"). The high orbital inclination of 2002 TX_{300} makes it a dynamically "hot" member of the classical Kuiper belt, which implies that it was gravitationally scattered out to its present location by Neptune's outward planetary migration in the Solar System's early history. Because of this, 2002 TX_{300} has sometimes been classified as a "scattered" object.

=== Haumea family ===
A chart showing confirmed Haumea family members to scale (as of 2025). Unmeasured members are shown with estimated diameters using an assumed albedo of 0.7.

The orbit of 2002 TX_{300} is very similar to that of the dwarf planet Haumea, which suggests that 2002 TX_{300} could be a collisional fragment of the dwarf planet. 2002 TX_{300}'s surface color, composition, and reflectivity matches that of Haumea as well, which lends further credibility to this scenario. It is now widely accepted among researchers that 2002 TX_{300} originated from Haumea; it is classified as a member of the Haumea family, a population of Kuiper belt objects that are suspected to be fragments of Haumea.

== Physical characteristics ==
=== Surface and composition ===
The surface of 2002 TX_{300} is mostly made of highly reflective fresh water ice, which makes the object appear bright and "spectrally neutral" in visible light—meaning it reflects equal amounts of light across the visible spectrum, which gives 2002 TX_{300} a gray color. With a geometric albedo between 50% and 80%, (Note: The 50%–80% range (also written as 0.5–0.8 in decimal form) is the lower and upper bound for the albedo value of 0.65±0.15 given by Ortiz et al. (2019).) 2002 TX_{300} has one of the most reflective surfaces seen among Kuiper belt objects (KBOs). 2002 TX_{300} stands out from typical KBOs, whose surfaces are commonly dark and reddened due to irradiated organic compounds or tholins.

The object's spectrum in the visible and near-infrared ranges is very similar to that of Charon, characterized by neutral to blue slope (1%/1000 Å) with deep (60%) water absorption bands at 1.5 and 2.0 μm. Mineralogical analysis indicates a substantial fraction of large ice (H_{2}O) particles. The signal-to-noise ratio of the observations was insufficient to differentiate between amorphous or crystalline ice (crystalline ice was reported on Charon, Quaoar and Haumea). The proportion of highly processed organic materials (tholins), typically present on numerous trans-Neptunian objects, is very low. As suggested by Licandro et al. 2006, this lack of irradiated mantle suggest either a recent collision or comet activity.

=== Size ===
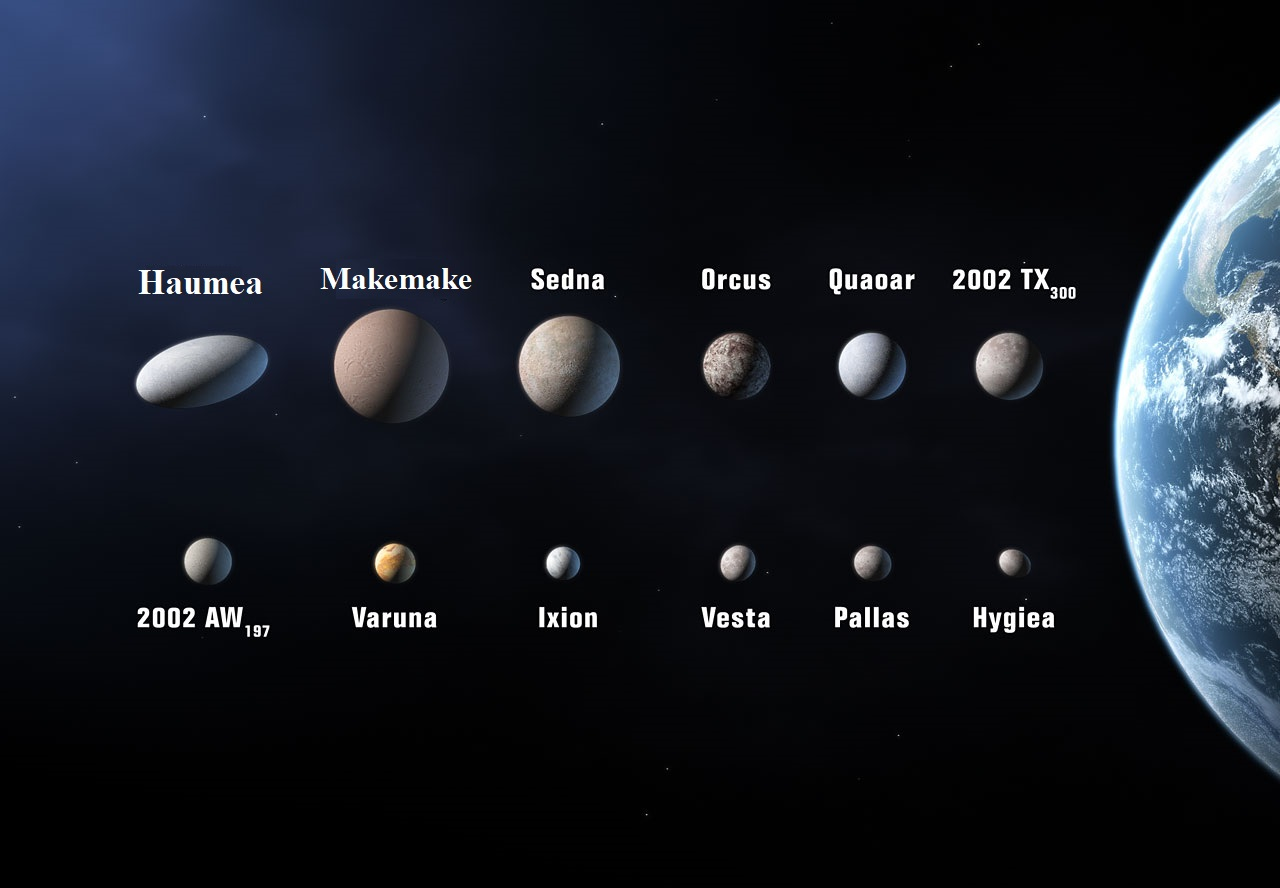
This graphic used in the first draft of the 2006 IAU planet definition suggested that 2002 TX_{300} could be as large as the dwarf planet Quaoar.

2002 TX_{300} has a diameter of 320 ± 50 km (199 ± 31 mi), according to measurements from stellar occultation observations. At this size, 2002 TX_{300} is too small to gravitationally collapse itself into a sphere (be in hydrostatic equilibrium), so it does not qualify as a dwarf planet. For comparison, the diameter of Saturn's smallest round moon Mimas is 396 km (246 mi). Although the mass and density of 2002 TX_{300} have not been measured, its overall composition has been inferred to be mostly water ice like its surface, which would suggest that 2002 TX_{300}'s bulk density should be likely around 1 g/cm^{3}, similar to that of water ice. This density would correspond to a mass on the order of 10^{19} kg (about 1.6×10^{−4} times the mass of Earth's Moon) for 2002 TX_{300}.

==== History of size estimates ====
History of diameter estimates for 2002 TX_{300}
Year of Publication	Diameter (km)	Method	Refs
2005	≤709	thermal (IRAM)	
2008	<641.2+250.3 −206.7	thermal (Spitzer)	
2009	<420	thermal (Spitzer, remodeled)	
2010	286±10	occultation	
2018	323+95 −37	occultation (reanalyzed)	
2020	320±50	occultation (reanalyzed)	

When 2002 TX_{300} was discovered, astronomers initially thought it could be a large dwarf planet up to 1,000 km (620 mi) in diameter, because it was one of the brightest KBOs known at the time. 2002 TX_{300} was even included in the International Astronomical Union's (IAU) roster of dwarf planet candidates in their first draft of the 2006 IAU definition of "planet", where they cited an upper limit diameter of 700 km (430 mi) for 2002 TX_{300}. This overestimation of 2002 TX_{300}'s diameter came from astronomers incorrectly assuming that it has a dark, low-albedo surface like the bright KBOs 50000 Quaoar, 55565 Aya, and 20000 Varuna. Astronomers began suspecting that 2002 TX_{300} must be smaller than initially thought, when far-infrared and radio telescopes showed no significant thermal emission coming from the object.

Astronomers were able to measure the diameter and albedo of 2002 TX_{300} for the first time on 9 October 2009, when the object occulted or blocked out the light of a background star. 2002 TX_{300} was the first Kuiper belt object (besides Pluto and its moon Charon) that was observed via stellar occultation. The stellar occultation was predicted and observed by a network of astronomers stationed at 18 different locations across Hawaii. Only two of these locations successfully observed the occultation; an initial analysis of their detections indicated that 2002 TX_{300} should have a diameter of 286 km (178 mi) if it was spherical. However, this diameter estimate was affected by a timing error between the two occultation detections; reanalysis of the 2009 occultation data in 2018 and 2019 suggested that 2002 TX_{300} should have a slightly larger diameter of about 320 km (200 mi).

=== Shape and rotation ===
Although the exact shape of 2002 TX_{300} is unknown, it is expected to be similar to an oblate spheroid, with irregularities. Observations of 2002 TX_{300}'s brightness over time indicate it has a rotation period of either 8.04 or 16.08 hours, depending on whether the object's brightness variability is caused by surface albedo variations or an elongated shape. Studies from 2003 to 2018 have consistently shown that 2002 TX_{300} exhibits very little brightness variation (less than 0.1 magnitudes), which makes it difficult to determine its rotation period. The axial tilt of 2002 TX_{300} is unknown.

=== Lack of atmosphere ===
Observations of the 9 October 2009 stellar occultation by 2002 TX_{300} showed that the object lacks an atmosphere with a surface number density greater than 2×10^{15} particles per cubic centimetre. 2002 TX_{300} is expected to not have an atmosphere because its mass is too small for its gravity to hold onto light gases.

== See also ==
- (19308) 1996 TO66 – the first Haumea family member discovered
