= Collisional family =

Type of group of minor planets

Diagram showing the similarities between the satellites of each of the outer groups of Jovian moons

In astronomy, a collisional family is a group of objects that are thought to have a common origin in an impact (collision). They have similar compositions and most share similar orbital elements.

Known or suspected collisional families include numerous asteroid families, most of the irregular moons of the outer planets, and the dwarf planet Haumea.

== See also ==
- Haumea family
- Karin family, one of the youngest known asteroid collisional families
- Satellite collision
- Origin of the Moon
