= Orbital resonance =

Regular and periodic mutual gravitational influence of orbiting bodies

The three-body Laplace resonance exhibited by three of Jupiter's Galilean moons. Conjunctions are highlighted by brief color changes. There are two Io-Europa conjunctions (green) and three Io-Ganymede conjunctions (grey) for each Europa-Ganymede conjunction (magenta). This diagram is not to scale.

Plot of vertical position y vs time t of the animation above.

In celestial mechanics, orbital resonance occurs when orbiting bodies exert regular, periodic gravitational influence on each other, usually because their orbital periods are related by a ratio of small integers. Most commonly, this relationship is found between a pair of objects (binary resonance). The physical principle behind orbital resonance is similar in concept to pushing a child on a swing, whereby the orbit and the swing both have a natural frequency, and the body doing the "pushing" will act in periodic repetition to have a cumulative effect on the motion. Orbital resonances greatly enhance the mutual gravitational influence of the bodies (i.e., their ability to alter or constrain each other's orbits). In most cases, this results in an unstable interaction, in which the bodies exchange momentum and shift orbits until the resonance no longer exists. Under some circumstances, a resonant system can be self-correcting and thus stable. Examples are the near 28:14:7:3 resonance of Jupiter's moons Io, Europa, Ganymede and Callisto, and the 3:2 resonance between Neptune and Pluto. Unstable resonances with Saturn's inner moons give rise to gaps in the rings of Saturn. The special case of 1:1 resonance between bodies with similar orbital radii causes large planetary system bodies to eject most other bodies sharing their orbits; this is part of the much more extensive process of clearing the neighbourhood, an effect that is used in the current definition of a planet.

A binary resonance ratio in this article should be interpreted as the ratio of number of orbits completed in the same time interval, rather than as the ratio of orbital periods, which would be the inverse ratio. Thus, the 2:3 ratio above means that Pluto completes two orbits in the time it takes Neptune to complete three. In the case of resonance relationships among three or more bodies, either type of ratio may be used (whereby the smallest whole-integer ratio sequences are not necessarily reversals of each other), and the type of ratio will be specified.

== History ==
Since the discovery of Newton's law of universal gravitation in the 17th century, the stability of the Solar System has preoccupied many mathematicians, starting with Pierre-Simon Laplace. The stable orbits that arise in a two-body approximation ignore the influence of other bodies. The effect of these added interactions on the stability of the Solar System is very small, but at first it was not known whether they might add up over longer periods to significantly change the orbital parameters and lead to a completely different configuration, or whether some other stabilising effects might maintain the configuration of the orbits of the planets.

It was Laplace who found the first answers explaining the linked orbits of the Galilean moons (see below). Before Newton, there was also consideration of ratios and proportions in orbital motions, in what was called "the music of the spheres", or musica universalis.

The article on resonant interactions describes resonance in the general modern setting. A primary result from the study of dynamical systems is the discovery and description of a highly simplified model of mode-locking; this is an oscillator that receives periodic kicks via a weak coupling to some driving motor. The analog here would be that a more massive body provides a periodic gravitational kick to a smaller body, as it passes by. The mode-locking regions are named Arnold tongues.

== Types ==
The semimajor axes of resonant trans-Neptunian objects (red) are clumped at locations of low-integer resonances with Neptune (vertical red bars near top), in contrast to those of cubewanos (blue) and nonresonant (or not known to be resonant) scattered objects (grey).

A chart of the distribution of asteroid semimajor axes, showing the Kirkwood gaps where orbits are destabilized by resonances with Jupiter

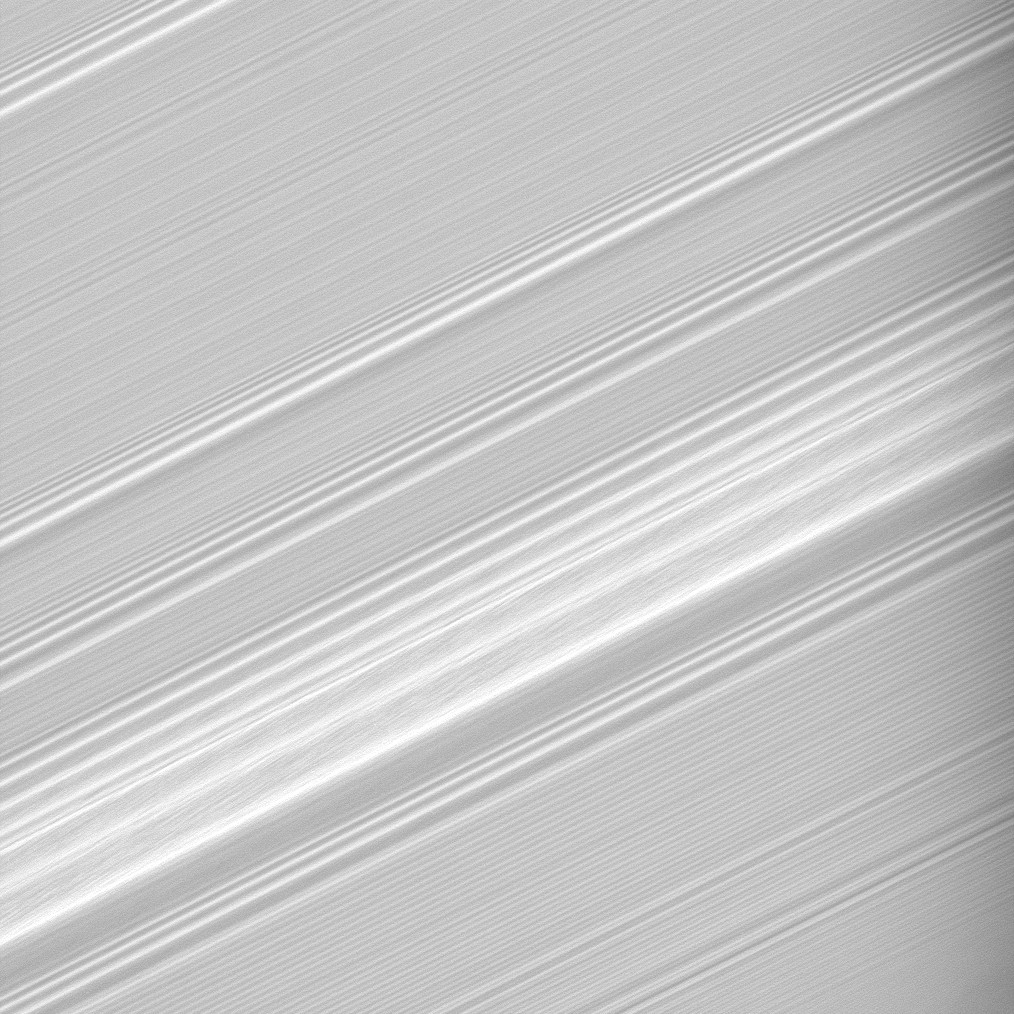
Spiral density waves in Saturn's A Ring excited by resonances with inner moons. Such waves propagate away from the planet (towards upper left). The large set of waves just below center is due to the 6:5 resonance with Janus.

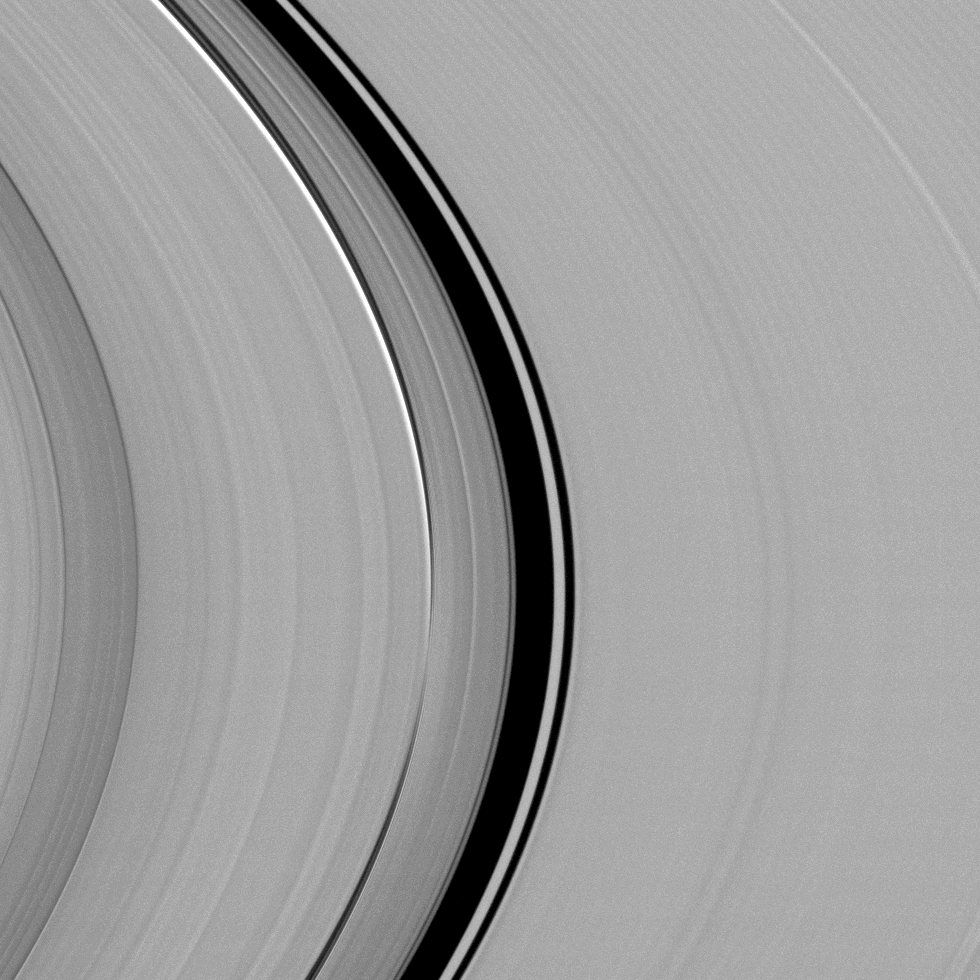
The eccentric Titan Ringlet in the Columbo Gap of Saturn's C Ring (center) and the inclined orbits of resonant particles in the bending wave just inside it have apsidal and nodal precessions, respectively, commensurate with Titan's mean motion.

In general, an orbital resonance may

- involve one or any combination of the orbit parameters (e.g. eccentricity versus semimajor axis, or eccentricity versus inclination).
- act on any time scale from short term, commensurable with the orbit periods, to secular, measured in 10^{4} to 10^{6} years.
- lead to either long-term stabilization of the orbits or be the cause of their destabilization.

=== Mean motion orbital resonance ===
A mean motion orbital resonance (MMR) occurs when multiple bodies have orbital periods or mean motions (orbital frequencies) that are simple integer ratios of each other.

==== Two-body mean motion resonance ====
The simplest cases of MMRs involve only two bodies. The ratio of the periods needs to be near a rational number, but not exactly a rational number, even averaged over a long period, because there is a dependence on the motion of the pericenter. For example, in the case of Pluto and Neptune (see below), the true equation says that the average rate of change of $3\alpha_P-2\alpha_N-\varpi_P$ is exactly zero, where $\alpha_P$ is the longitude of Pluto, $\alpha_N$ is the longitude of Neptune, and $\varpi_P$ is the longitude of Pluto's perihelion. Since the rate of motion of the latter is about 0.97×10^{−4} degrees per year, the ratio of periods is actually 1.503 in the long term.

Depending on the details, two-body MMRs can either stabilize or destabilize the orbit of one of the resonant bodies. Stabilization may occur when the two bodies move in such a synchronised fashion that they never closely approach. For instance:

- The orbits of Pluto and the plutinos are stable, despite crossing that of the much larger Neptune, because they are in a 2:3 resonance with it. The resonance ensures that, when they approach perihelion and Neptune's orbit, Neptune is consistently distant (averaging a quarter of its orbit away). Other (much more numerous) Neptune-crossing bodies that were not in resonance were ejected from that region by strong perturbations due to Neptune. There are also smaller but significant groups of resonant trans-Neptunian objects occupying the 1:1 (Neptune trojans), 3:5, 4:7, 1:2 (twotinos) and 2:5 resonances, among others, with respect to Neptune.
- In the asteroid belt beyond 3.5 AU from the Sun, the 3:2, 4:3 and 1:1 resonances with Jupiter are populated by clumps of asteroids (the Hilda family, the few Thule asteroids, and the numerous Trojan asteroids, respectively).

MMRs can also destabilize one of the orbits. This process can be exploited to find energy-efficient ways of deorbiting spacecraft. For small bodies, destabilization is actually far more likely. For instance:

- In the asteroid belt within 3.5 AU from the Sun, the major MMRs with Jupiter are locations of gaps in the asteroid distribution, the Kirkwood gaps (most notably at the 4:1, 3:1, 5:2, 7:3 and 2:1 resonances). Asteroids have been ejected from these almost empty lanes by repeated perturbations. However, there are still populations of asteroids temporarily present in or near these resonances. For example, asteroids of the Alinda family are in or close to the 3:1 resonance, with their orbital eccentricity steadily increased by interactions with Jupiter until they eventually have a close encounter with an inner planet that ejects them from the resonance.
- In the rings of Saturn, the Cassini Division is a gap between the inner B Ring and the outer A Ring that has been cleared by a 2:1 resonance with the moon Mimas. (More specifically, the site of the resonance is the Huygens Gap, which bounds the outer edge of the B Ring.)
- In the rings of Saturn, the Encke and Keeler gaps within the A Ring are cleared by 1:1 resonances with the embedded moonlets Pan and Daphnis, respectively. The A Ring's outer edge is maintained by a destabilizing 7:6 resonance with the moon Janus.

Most bodies that are in two-body MMRs orbit in the same direction; however, the retrograde asteroid 514107 Kaʻepaokaʻāwela appears to be in a stable (for a period of at least a million years) 1:−1 resonance with Jupiter. In addition, a few retrograde damocloids have been found that are temporarily captured in MMR with Jupiter or Saturn. Such orbital interactions are weaker than the corresponding interactions between bodies orbiting in the same direction. The trans-Neptunian object 471325 Taowu has an orbital inclination of 110° with respect to the planets' orbital plane and is currently in a 7:9 polar resonance with Neptune.

==== N-body mean motion resonance ====
MMRs involving more than two bodies have been observed in the Solar System. For example, there are three-body MMRs involving Jupiter, Saturn, and some main-belt asteroids. These three-body MMRs are unstable and main-belt asteroids involved in these three-body MMRs have chaotic orbital evolutions.

A Laplace resonance is a three-body MMR with a 1:2:4 orbital period ratio (equivalent to a 4:2:1 ratio of orbits). The term arose because Pierre-Simon Laplace discovered that such a resonance governed the motions of Jupiter's moons Io, Europa, and Ganymede. It is now also often applied to other 3-body resonances with the same ratios, such as that between the extrasolar planets Gliese 876 c, b, and e. Three-body resonances involving other simple integer ratios have been termed "Laplace-like" or "Laplace-type".

=== Lindblad resonance ===
A Lindblad resonance drives spiral density waves both in galaxies (where stars are subject to forcing by the spiral arms themselves) and in Saturn's rings (where ring particles are subject to forcing by Saturn's moons).

=== Secular resonance ===
A secular resonance occurs when the precession of two orbits is synchronised (usually a precession of the perihelion or ascending node). A small body in secular resonance with a much larger one (e.g. a planet) will precess at the same rate as the large body. Over long times (a million years, or so) a secular resonance will change the eccentricity and inclination of the small body.

Several prominent examples of secular resonance involve Saturn. There is a near-resonance between the precession of Saturn's rotational axis and that of Neptune's orbital axis (both of which have periods of about 1.87 million years), which has been identified as the likely source of Saturn's large axial tilt (26.7°). Initially, Saturn probably had a tilt closer to that of Jupiter (3.1°). The gradual depletion of the Kuiper belt would have decreased the precession rate of Neptune's orbit; eventually, the frequencies matched, and Saturn's axial precession was captured into a spin-orbit resonance, leading to an increase in Saturn's obliquity. (The angular momentum of Neptune's orbit is 10^{4} times that of Saturn's rotation rate, and thus dominates the interaction.) However, it seems that the resonance no longer exists. Detailed analysis of data from the Cassini spacecraft gives a value of the moment of inertia of Saturn that is just outside the range for the resonance to exist, meaning that the spin axis does not stay in phase with Neptune's orbital inclination in the long term, as it apparently did in the past. One theory for why the resonance came to an end is that there was another moon around Saturn whose orbit destabilized about 100 million years ago, perturbing Saturn.

The perihelion secular resonance between asteroids and Saturn helps shape the asteroid belt. This involves a rate of change of angle called ν_{6}, defined as g − g_{6} where g is the rate of change of the longitude of perihelion of the asteroid and g_{6} is that of Saturn (as the sixth planet from the Sun). The value of ν_{6} depends on the semi-major axis (or period) of the asteroid and its inclination. Asteroids which approach a state where ν_{6} goes to zero have their eccentricity slowly increased until they become Mars-crossers, at which point they are usually ejected from the asteroid belt by a close pass to Mars. This resonance forms the inner and "side" boundaries of the asteroid belt around 2 AU, and at inclinations of about 20°.

Numerical simulations have suggested that the eventual formation of a perihelion secular resonance between Mercury and Jupiter (g_{1} = g_{5}, where again g is the rate of change of the longitude of perihelion) has the potential to greatly increase Mercury's eccentricity and destabilize the inner Solar System several billion years from now.

The Titan Ringlet within Saturn's C Ring represents another type of resonance in which the rate of apsidal precession of one orbit exactly matches the speed of revolution of another. The outer end of this eccentric ringlet always points towards Saturn's major moon Titan.

A Kozai resonance occurs when the inclination and eccentricity of a perturbed orbit oscillate synchronously (increasing eccentricity while decreasing inclination and vice versa). This resonance applies only to bodies on highly inclined orbits; as a consequence, such orbits tend to be unstable, since the growing eccentricity would result in small pericenters, typically leading to a collision or (for large moons) destruction by tidal forces.

In an example of another type of resonance involving orbital eccentricity, the eccentricities of Ganymede and Callisto vary with a common period of 181 years, although with opposite phases.

== Solar System ==
Depiction of Haumea's presumed 7:12 resonance with Neptune in a rotating frame, with Neptune (blue dot at lower right) held stationary. Haumea's shifting orbital alignment relative to Neptune periodically reverses (librates), preserving the resonance.

There are only a few known mean-motion resonances (MMR) in the Solar System involving planets, dwarf planets or larger satellites (a much greater number involve asteroids, planetary rings, moonlets and smaller Kuiper belt objects, including many possible dwarf planets).

- 2:3 Pluto–Neptune (also Orcus and other plutinos)
- 2:4 Tethys–Mimas (Saturn's moons). Not reduced to 1:2 because the libration of the nodes must be taken into account.
- 1:2 Dione–Enceladus (Saturn's moons)
- 3:4 Hyperion–Titan (Saturn's moons)
- 1:2:4 Ganymede–Europa–Io (Jupiter's moons).

Additionally, Haumea is thought to be in a 7:12 resonance with Neptune, Gonggong is thought to be in a 3:10 resonance with Neptune, and there are many smaller objects with other resonances with Neptune.

The apparent simple integer ratios between periods hide more complex relations:

- the point of conjunction can oscillate (librate) around an equilibrium point defined by the resonance.
- the motion of the nodes or periapsides (which may be resonance related, short period, not secular precession) comes into play as well.

As illustration of the latter, consider the well-known 2:1 resonance of Io-Europa (part of the Laplace resonance, see below). If the orbiting periods were in this relation, the mean motions $n\,\!$ (inverse of periods, often expressed in degrees per day) would satisfy the following

$$n_{\rm Io} - 2\cdot n_{\rm Eu}=0$$

Substituting the data (from Wikipedia) one will get −0.7395° per day, a value substantially different from zero.

Actually, the resonance is perfect in the long term, but it involves also the precession of pericenter (the point closest to Jupiter), $\dot\omega$. The correct equation (part of the Laplace equations) is:

$$n_{\rm Io} - 2\cdot n_{\rm Eu} + \dot\omega_{\rm Io}\approx 0$$

Although even this at a given moment is not exactly zero, its long-term average is. In other words, the mean motion of Io is indeed double of that of Europa, in the long term, taking into account the precession of the perijove. Conjunctions always occur on the same side of Jupiter as the pericenter of Io. (The pericenter of Europa is always on the opposite side.) The other pairs listed above satisfy the same type of equation with the exception of Mimas-Tethys resonance. In this case, the resonance satisfies the equation

$$4\cdot n_{\rm Te} - 2\cdot n_{\rm Mi} - \dot\Omega_{\rm Te}- \dot\Omega_{\rm Mi}=0$$

The point of conjunctions librates around the midpoint between the nodes of the two moons.

=== Laplace resonance ===
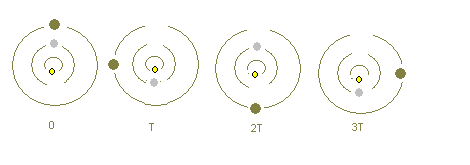
Illustration of Io–Europa–Ganymede resonance. From the centre outwards: Io (yellow), Europa (gray), and Ganymede (dark)

The Laplace resonance involving Io–Europa–Ganymede includes the following relation locking the orbital phase of the moons:

$$\Phi_L=\lambda_{\rm Io} - 3\cdot\lambda_{\rm Eu} + 2\cdot\lambda_{\rm Ga}\approx 180^\circ$$

where the $\lambda$ are mean longitudes of the moons. The actual value librates about 180° with an amplitude of 0.03° and a period of about 2000 days.

This relation makes a triple conjunction impossible. (A Laplace resonance in the Gliese 876 system, in contrast, is associated with one triple conjunction per orbit of the outermost planet, ignoring libration.) The graph illustrates the positions of the moons after 1, 2, and 3 Io periods.

=== Plutino resonances ===
The dwarf planet Pluto is following an orbit trapped in a web of resonances with Neptune. The resonances include:

- A mean-motion resonance of 2:3
- The resonance of the argument of perihelion (libration around 90°), keeping the perihelion above the ecliptic
- The resonance of the longitude of the perihelion in relation to that of Neptune

One consequence of these resonances is that a separation of at least 30 AU is maintained when Pluto crosses Neptune's orbit. The minimum separation between the two bodies over two Pluto periods is 17 AU (occurring near Pluto's aphelion), while the minimum separation between Pluto and Uranus is only 11 AU, though currently they only get to 15 AU separation (see Pluto's orbit for detailed explanation and graphs).

Bodies in a similar 2:3 resonance with Neptune are called plutinos. The next largest after Pluto is the dwarf planet Orcus. Orcus has an orbit similar in inclination and eccentricity to Pluto's. However, the two are constrained by their resonances with Neptune to be far apart.

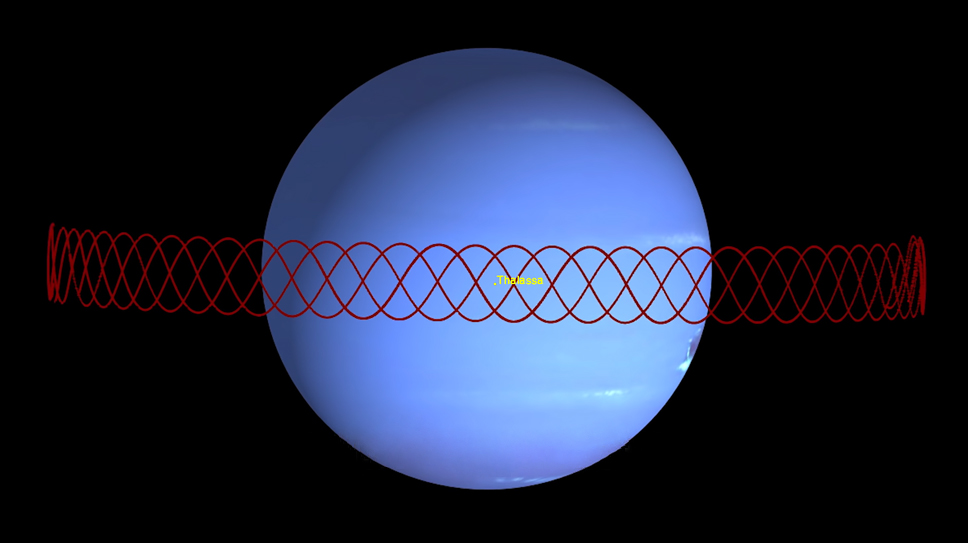
Depiction of the resonance between Neptune's moons Naiad (whose orbital motion is shown in red) and Thalassa, in a view that co-rotates with the latter

=== Naiad:Thalassa 73:69 resonance ===
Neptune's innermost moon, Naiad, is in a 73:69 fourth-order resonance (meaning four conjunctions per cycle) with the next outward moon, Thalassa. As it orbits Neptune, the more inclined Naiad successively passes Thalassa twice further north and then twice further south, in a cycle that repeats about every 21.5 Earth days. The two moons are about 3540 km apart when they pass each other. Although their orbital radii differ by only 1850 km, Naiad swings ~2800 km north or south of Thalassa's orbital plane at closest approach. As is common, this resonance stabilizes the orbits by avoiding close approach at conjunction, but it is unusual for the role played by orbital inclination in facilitating this avoidance in a case where eccentricities are almost zero. (Note: The nature of this resonance (ignoring subtleties like libration and precession) can be crudely obtained from the orbital periods as follows. From Showalter et al., 2019, the periods of Naiad (Pn) and Thalassa (Pt) are 0.294396 and 0.311484 days, respectively. From these, the period between conjunctions can be calculated as 5.366 days (1/[1/Pn – 1/Pt]), which is 18.23 (≈ 18.25) orbits of Naiad and 17.23 (≈ 17.25) orbits of Thalassa. Thus, after four conjunction periods, 73 orbits of Naiad and 69 orbits of Thalassa have elapsed, and the original configuration will be restored.)

== Exoplanets ==
Resonant planetary system of two planets with a 1:2 orbit ratio

While most extrasolar planetary systems discovered have not been found to have planets in mean-motion resonances, chains of up to five resonant planets and up to seven at least near resonant planets have been uncovered. Simulations have shown that during planetary system formation, the appearance of resonant chains of planetary embryos is favored by the presence of the primordial gas disc. Once that gas dissipates, 90–95% of those chains must then become unstable to match the low frequency of resonant chains observed.

- As mentioned above, Gliese 876 e, b and c are in a Laplace resonance, with a 4:2:1 ratio of periods (124.3, 61.1 and 30.0 days). In this case, $\Phi_L$ librates with an amplitude of 40° ± 13° and the resonance follows the time-averaged relation:

$$\Phi_L=\lambda_{\rm c} - 3\cdot\lambda_{\rm d} + 2\cdot\lambda_{\rm e}=0^\circ$$

- Kepler-223 has four planets in a resonance with an 8:6:4:3 orbit ratio, and a 3:4:6:8 ratio of periods (7.3845, 9.8456, 14.7887 and 19.7257 days). This represents the first confirmed 4-body orbital resonance. The librations within this system are such that close encounters between two planets occur only when the other planets are in distant parts of their orbits. Simulations indicate that this system of resonances must have formed via planetary migration.
- Kepler-80 d, e, b, c and g have periods in a ~ 1.000: 1.512: 2.296: 3.100: 4.767 ratio (3.0722, 4.6449, 7.0525, 9.5236 and 14.6456 days). However, in a frame of reference that rotates with the conjunctions, this reduces to a period ratio of 4:6:9:12:18 (an orbit ratio of 9:6:4:3:2). Conjunctions of d and e, e and b, b and c, and c and g occur at relative intervals of 2:3:6:6 (9.07, 13.61 and 27.21 days) in a pattern that repeats about every 190.5 days (seven full cycles in the rotating frame) in the inertial or nonrotating frame (equivalent to a 62:41:27:20:13 orbit ratio resonance in the nonrotating frame, because the conjunctions circulate in the direction opposite orbital motion). Librations of possible three-body resonances have amplitudes of only about 3 degrees, and modeling indicates the resonant system is stable to perturbations. Triple conjunctions do not occur.
- TOI-178 has 6 confirmed planets, of which the outer 5 planets form a similar resonant chain in a rotating frame of reference, which can be expressed as 2:4:6:9:12 in period ratios, or as 18:9:6:4:3 in orbit ratios. In addition, the innermost planet b with period of 1.91d orbits close to where it would also be part of the same Laplace resonance chain, as a 3:5 resonance with the planet c would be fulfilled at period of ~1.95d, implying that it might have evolved there but pulled out of resonance, possibly by tidal forces.
- TRAPPIST-1's seven approximately Earth-sized planets are in a chain of near resonances (the longest such chain known), having an orbit ratio of approximately 24, 15, 9, 6, 4, 3 and 2, or nearest-neighbor period ratios (proceeding outward) of about 8/5, 5/3, 3/2, 3/2, 4/3 and 3/2 (1.603, 1.672, 1.506, 1.509, 1.342 and 1.519). They are also configured such that each triple of adjacent planets is in a Laplace resonance (i.e., b, c and d in one such Laplace configuration; c, d and e in another, etc.). The resonant configuration is expected to be stable on a time scale of billions of years, assuming it arose during planetary migration. A musical interpretation of the resonance has been provided.
- Kepler-29 has a pair of planets in a 7:9 resonance (ratio of 1/1.28587).
- Kepler-36 has a pair of planets close to a 6:7 resonance.
- Kepler-37 d, c and b are within one percent of a resonance with an 8:15:24 orbit ratio and a 15:8:5 ratio of periods (39.792187, 21.301886 and 13.367308 days).
- Of Kepler-90's eight known planets, the period ratios b:c, c:i and i:d are close to 4:5, 3:5 and 1:4, respectively (4:4.977, 3:4.97 and 1:4.13) and d, e, f, g and h are close to a 2:3:4:7:11 period ratio (2: 3.078: 4.182: 7.051: 11.102; also 7: 11.021). f, g and h are also close to a 3:5:8 period ratio (3: 5.058: 7.964). Relevant to systems like this and that of Kepler-36, calculations suggest that the presence of an outer gas giant planet facilitates the formation of closely packed resonances among inner super-Earths.
- HD 41248 has a pair of super-Earths within 0.3% of a 5:7 resonance (ratio of 1/1.39718).
- K2-138 has 5 confirmed planets in an unbroken near-3:2 resonance chain (with periods of 2.353, 3.560, 5.405, 8.261 and 12.758 days). The system was discovered in the citizen science project Exoplanet Explorers, using K2 data. K2-138 could host co-orbital bodies (in a 1:1 mean-motion resonance). Resonant chain systems can stabilize co-orbital bodies and a dedicated analysis of the K2 light curve and radial-velocity from HARPS might reveal them. Follow-up observations with the Spitzer Space Telescope suggest a sixth planet continuing the 3:2 resonance chain, while leaving two gaps in the chain (its period is 41.97 days). These gaps could be filled by smaller non-transiting planets. Future observations with CHEOPS will measure transit-timing variations of the system to further analyse the mass of the planets and could potentially find other planetary bodies in the system.
- K2-32 has four planets in a near 1:2:5:7 resonance (with periods of 4.34, 8.99, 20.66 and 31.71 days). Planet e has a radius almost identical to that of the Earth. The other planets have a size between Neptune and Saturn.
- V1298 Tauri has four confirmed planets of which planets c, d and b are near a 1:2:3 resonance (with periods of 8.25, 12.40 and 24.14 days). Planet e only shows a single transit in the K2 light curve and has a period larger than 36 days. Planet e might be in a low-order resonance (of 2:3, 3:5, 1:2, or 1:3) with planet b. The system is very young (23±4 Myr) and might be a precursor of a compact multiplanet system. The 2:3 resonance suggests that some close-in planets may either form in resonances or evolve into them on timescales of less than 10 Myr. The planets in the system have a size between Neptune and Saturn. Only planet b has a size similar to Jupiter.
- HD 158259 contains four planets in a 3:2 near resonance chain (with periods of 3.432, 5.198, 7.954 and 12.03 days, or period ratios of 1.51, 1.53 and 1.51, respectively), with a possible fifth planet also near a 3:2 resonance (with a period of 17.4 days). The exoplanets were found with the SOPHIE échelle spectrograph, using the radial velocity method.
- Kepler-1649 contains two Earth-size planets close to a 9:4 resonance (with periods of 19.53527 and 8.689099 days, or a period ratio of 2.24825), including one ("c") in the habitable zone. An undetected planet with a 13.0-day period would create a 3:2 resonance chain.
- Kepler-88 has a pair of inner planets close to a 1:2 resonance (period ratio of 2.0396), with a mass ratio of ~22.5, producing very large transit timing variations of ~0.5 days for the innermost planet. There is a yet more massive outer planet in a ~1400 day orbit.
- HD 110067 has six known planets, in a 54:36:24:16:12:9 resonance ratio.

Cases of extrasolar planets close to a 1:2 mean-motion resonance are fairly common. Sixteen percent of systems found by the transit method are reported to have an example of this (with period ratios in the range 1.83–2.18), as well as one sixth of planetary systems characterized by Doppler spectroscopy (with in this case a narrower period ratio range). Due to incomplete knowledge of the systems, the actual proportions are likely to be higher. Overall, about a third of radial velocity characterized systems appear to have a pair of planets close to a commensurability. It is much more common for pairs of planets to have orbital period ratios a few percent larger than a mean-motion resonance ratio than a few percent smaller (particularly in the case of first order resonances, in which the integers in the ratio differ by one). This was predicted to be true in cases where tidal interactions with the star are significant.

== Coincidental 'near' ratios of mean motion ==
Depiction of asteroid Pallas's 18:7 near resonance with Jupiter in a rotating frame (click for animation). Jupiter (pink loop at upper left) is held nearly stationary. The shift in Pallas's orbital alignment relative to Jupiter increases steadily over time; it never reverses course (i.e., there is no libration).

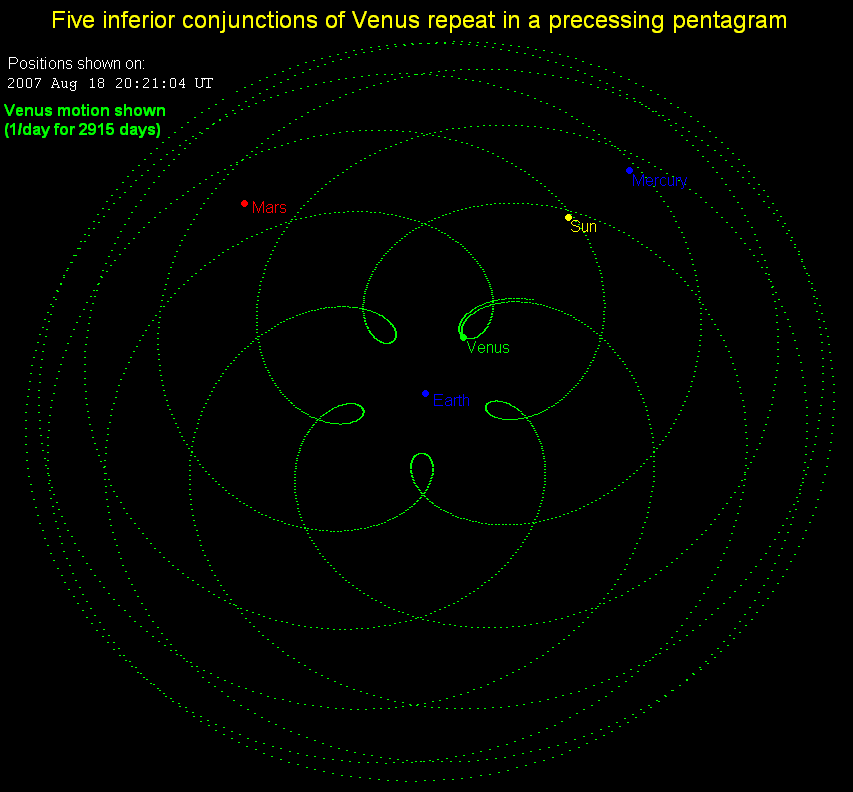
Depiction of the Earth:Venus 8:13 near resonance. With Earth held stationary at the center of a nonrotating frame, the successive inferior conjunctions of Venus over eight Earth years trace a pentagrammic pattern (reflecting the difference between the numbers in the ratio).

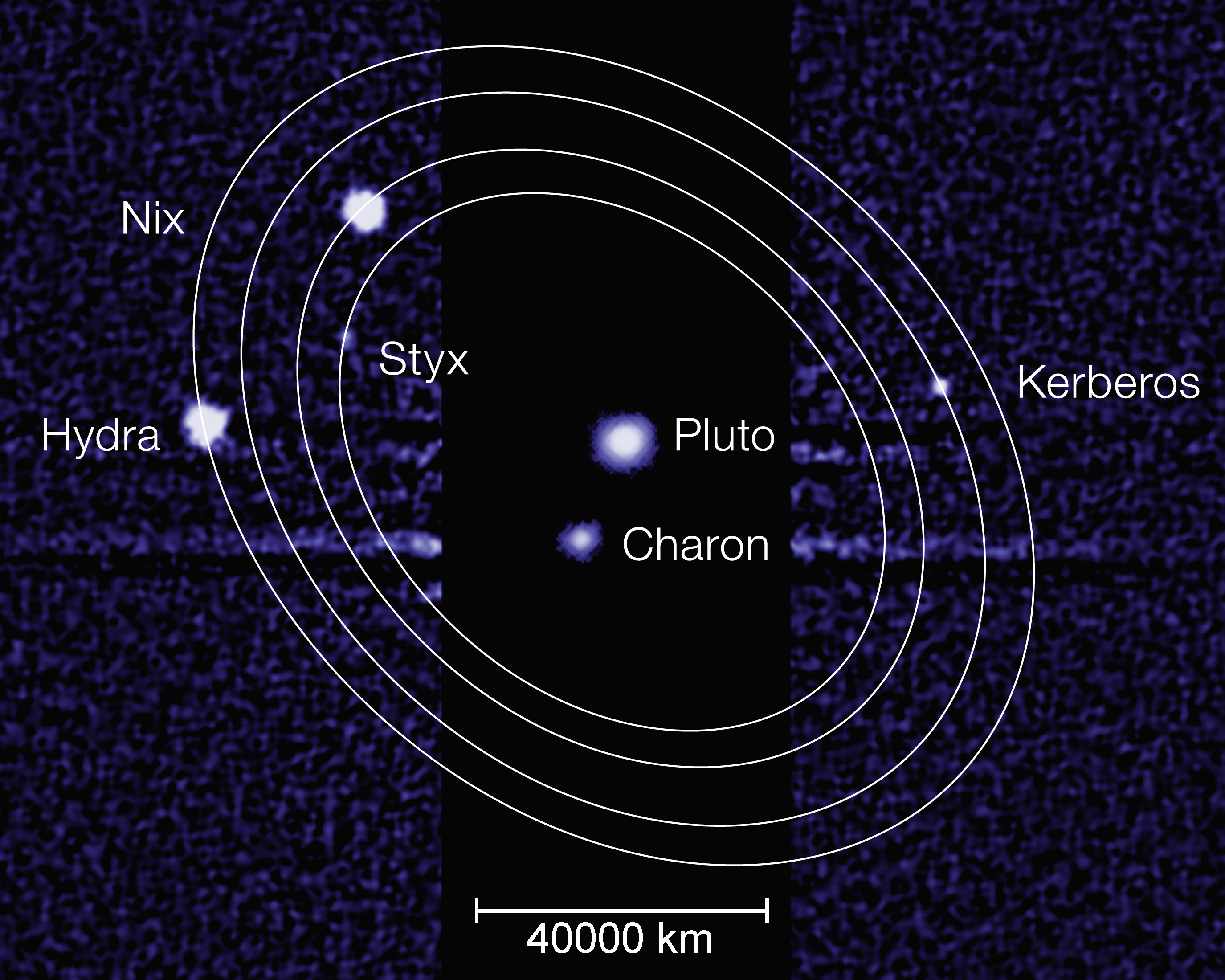
Diagram of the orbits of Pluto's small outer four moons, which follow a 3:4:5:6 sequence of near resonances relative to the period of its large inner satellite Charon.

A number of near-integer-ratio relationships between the orbital frequencies of the planets or major moons are sometimes pointed out (see list below). However, these have no dynamical significance because there is no appropriate precession of perihelion or other libration to make the resonance perfect (see the detailed discussion in the section above). Such near resonances are dynamically insignificant even if the mismatch is quite small because (unlike a true resonance), after each cycle the relative position of the bodies shifts. When averaged over astronomically short timescales, their relative position is random, just like bodies that are nowhere near resonance. For example, consider the orbits of Earth and Venus, which arrive at almost the same configuration after 8 Earth orbits and 13 Venus orbits. The actual ratio is 0.61518624, which is only 0.032% away from exactly 8:13. The mismatch after 8 years is only 1.5° of Venus's orbital movement. Still, this is enough that Venus and Earth find themselves in the opposite relative orientation to the original every 120 such cycles, which is 960 years. Therefore, on timescales of thousands of years or more (still tiny by astronomical standards), their relative position is effectively random.

The presence of a near resonance may reflect that a perfect resonance existed in the past, or that the system is evolving towards one in the future.

Some orbital frequency coincidences include:

Table of some orbital frequency coincidences in the Solar system
Ratio	Bodies	Mismatch after one cycle (Note: Mismatch in orbital longitude of the inner body, as compared to its position at the beginning of the cycle (with the cycle defined as n orbits of the outer body – see below). Circular orbits are assumed (i.e., precession is ignored).)	Randomization time (Note: The randomization time is the amount of time needed for the mismatch from the initial relative longitudinal orbital positions of the bodies to grow to 180°. The listed number is rounded to the nearest first significant digit.)	Probability (Note: Estimated probability of obtaining by chance an orbital coincidence of equal or smaller mismatch, at least once in n attempts, where n is the integer number of orbits of the outer body per cycle, and the mismatch is assumed to randomly vary between 0° and 180°. The value is calculated as 1 − ( 1 − mismatch / 180° )^{n} . This is a crude calculation that only attempts to give a rough idea of relative probabilities.) (Note: Smaller is better: The smaller the probability of an apparently resonant relationship arising as a mere chance alignment of random numbers, the more credible the proposal that gravitational interaction causes persistence of the relationship, or prolongs it / delays its ultimate dissolution by other, disruptive perturbations.)
Trans-planetary resonances
9:23	Venus–Mercury	4.0°	200 y	19%
1:4	Earth–Mercury	54.8°	3 y	30%
8:13	Earth–Venus (Note: The two near commensurabilities listed for Earth and Venus are reflected in the timing of transits of Venus, which occur in pairs 8 years apart, in a cycle that repeats every 243 years.)	1.5°	1000 y	6.5%
243:395	Earth–Venus	0.8°	50,000 y	68%
1:3	Mars–Venus	20.6°	20 y	11%
1:2	Mars–Earth	42.9°	8 y	24%
193:363	Mars–Earth	0.9°	70,000 y	62%
1:12	Jupiter–Earth (Note: The near 1:12 resonance between Jupiter and Earth has the coincidental side-effect of making the Alinda asteroids, which occupy (or are close to) the 3:1 resonance with Jupiter, to be close to a 1:4 resonance with Earth.)	49.1°	40 y	28%
3:19	Jupiter–Mars	28.7°	200 y	41%
2:5	Saturn–Jupiter (Note: The long-known near resonance between Jupiter and Saturn has traditionally been called the Great Inequality. It was first described by Laplace in a series of papers published 1784–1789.)	12.8°	800 y	13%
1:7	Uranus–Jupiter	31.1°	500 y	18%
7:20	Uranus–Saturn	5.7°	20,000 y	20%
5:28	Neptune–Saturn	1.9°	80,000 y	5.2%
1:2	Neptune–Uranus	14.0°	2000 y	7.8%
Mars's satellite system
1:4	Deimos–Phobos (Note: Resonances with a now-vanished inner moon are likely to have been involved in the formation of Phobos and Deimos.)	14.9°	0.04 y	8.3%
Major asteroids' resonances
1:1	Pallas–Ceres	0.7°	1000 y	0.39% (Note: Based on the proper orbital periods, 1684.869 and 1681.601 days, for Pallas and Ceres, respectively.)
7:18	Jupiter–Pallas	0.10°	100,000 y	0.4% (Note: Based on the "proper" orbital period of Pallas, 1684.869 days, and 4332.59 days for Jupiter.)
87 Sylvia's satellite system (Note: 87 Sylvia is the first asteroid discovered to have more than one moon.)
17:45	Romulus–Remus	0.7°	40 y	6.7%
Jupiter's satellite system
1:6	Io–Metis	0.6°	2 y	0.31%
3:5	Amalthea–Adrastea	3.9°	0.2 y	6.4%
3:7	Callisto–Ganymede	0.7°	30 y	1.2%
Saturn's satellite system
2:3	Enceladus–Mimas	33.2°	0.04 y	33%
2:3	Dione–Tethys (Note: This resonance may have been occupied in the past.)	36.2°	0.07 y	36%
3:5	Rhea–Dione	17.1°	0.4 y	26%
2:7	Titan–Rhea	21.0°	0.7 y	22%
1:5	Iapetus–Titan (Note: This resonance may have been occupied in the past.)	9.2°	4 y	5.1%
Major centaurs' resonances (Note: Some definitions of centaurs require that they not be resonant.)
3:4	Uranus–Chariklo	4.5°	10,000 y	7.3%
Uranus's satellite system
3:5	Rosalind–Cordelia	0.22°	4 y	0.37%
1:3	Umbriel–Miranda (Note: This resonance may have been occupied in the past.)	24.5°	0.08 y	14%
3:5	Umbriel–Ariel (Note: This resonance may have been occupied in the past.)	24.2°	0.3 y	35%
1:2	Titania–Umbriel	36.3°	0.1 y	20%
2:3	Oberon–Titania	33.4°	0.4 y	34%
Neptune's satellite system
1:20	Triton–Naiad	13.5°	0.2 y	7.5%
1:2	Proteus–Larissa	8.4°	0.07 y	4.7%
5:6	Proteus–Hippocamp	2.1°	1 y	5.7%
Pluto's satellite system
1:3	Styx–Charon	58.5°	0.2 y	33%
1:4	Nix–Charon	39.1°	0.3 y	22%
1:5	Kerberos–Charon	9.2°	2 y	5%
1:6	Hydra–Charon	6.6°	3 y	3.7%
Haumea's satellite system
3:8	Hiʻiaka–Namaka (Note: The results for the Haumea system aren't very meaningful because, contrary to the assumptions implicit in the calculations, Namaka has an eccentric, non-Keplerian orbit that precesses rapidly (see below). Hiʻiaka and Namaka are much closer to a 3:8 resonance than indicated, and may actually be in it.)	42.5°	2 y	55%

The least probable orbital correlation in the list – meaning the relationship that seems most likely to have not just be by random chance – is that between Io and Metis, followed by those between Rosalind and Cordelia, Pallas and Ceres, Jupiter and Pallas, Callisto and Ganymede, and Hydra and Charon, respectively.

== Possible past mean-motion resonances ==
A past resonance between Jupiter and Saturn may have played a dramatic role in early Solar System history. A 2004 computer model by Alessandro Morbidelli of the Observatoire de la Côte d'Azur in Nice suggested the formation of a 1:2 resonance between Jupiter and Saturn due to interactions with planetesimals that caused them to migrate inward and outward, respectively. In the model, this created a gravitational push that propelled both Uranus and Neptune into higher orbits, and in some scenarios caused them to switch places, which would have doubled Neptune's distance from the Sun. The resultant expulsion of objects from the proto-Kuiper belt as Neptune moved outwards could explain the Late Heavy Bombardment 600 million years after the Solar System's formation and the origin of Jupiter's Trojan asteroids. An outward migration of Neptune could also explain the current occupancy of some of its resonances (particularly the 2:5 resonance) within the Kuiper belt.

While Saturn's mid-sized moons Dione and Tethys are not close to an exact resonance now, they may have been in a 2:3 resonance early in the Solar System's history. This would have led to orbital eccentricity and tidal heating that may have warmed Tethys's interior enough to form a subsurface ocean. Subsequent freezing of the ocean after the moons escaped from the resonance may have generated the extensional stresses that created the enormous graben system of Ithaca Chasma on Tethys.

The satellite system of Uranus is notably different from those of Jupiter and Saturn in that it lacks precise resonances among the larger moons, while the majority of the larger moons of Jupiter (3 of the 4 largest) and of Saturn (6 of the 8 largest) are in mean-motion resonances. In all three satellite systems, moons were likely captured into mean-motion resonances in the past as their orbits shifted due to tidal dissipation, a process by which satellites gain orbital energy at the expense of the primary's rotational energy, affecting inner moons disproportionately. In the Uranian system, however, due to the planet's lesser degree of oblateness, and the larger relative size of its satellites, escape from a mean-motion resonance is much easier. Lower oblateness of the primary alters its gravitational field in such a way that different possible resonances are spaced more closely together. A larger relative satellite size increases the strength of their interactions. Both factors lead to more chaotic orbital behavior at or near mean-motion resonances. Escape from a resonance may be associated with capture into a secondary resonance, and/or tidal evolution-driven increases in orbital eccentricity or inclination.

Mean-motion resonances that probably once existed in the Uranus System include (3:5) Ariel-Miranda, (1:3) Umbriel-Miranda, (3:5) Umbriel-Ariel, and (1:4) Titania-Ariel. Evidence for such past resonances includes the relatively high eccentricities of the orbits of Uranus's inner satellites, and the anomalously high orbital inclination of Miranda. High past orbital eccentricities associated with the (1:3) Umbriel-Miranda and (1:4) Titania-Ariel resonances may have led to tidal heating of the interiors of Miranda and Ariel, respectively. Miranda probably escaped from its resonance with Umbriel via a secondary resonance, and the mechanism of this escape is believed to explain why its orbital inclination is more than 10 times those of the other regular Uranian moons (see Uranus's natural satellites).

Similar to the case of Miranda, the present inclinations of Jupiter's moonlets Amalthea and Thebe are thought to be indications of past passage through the 3:1 and 4:2 resonances with Io, respectively.

Neptune's regular moons Proteus and Larissa are thought to have passed through a 1:2 resonance a few hundred million years ago; the moons have drifted away from each other since then because Proteus is outside a synchronous orbit and Larissa is within one. Passage through the resonance is thought to have excited both moons' eccentricities to a degree that has not since been entirely damped out.

In the case of Pluto's satellites, it has been proposed that the present near resonances are relics of a previous precise resonance that was disrupted by tidal damping of the eccentricity of Charon's orbit (see Pluto's natural satellites for details). The near resonances may be maintained by a 15% local fluctuation in the Pluto-Charon gravitational field. Thus, these near resonances may not be coincidental.

The smaller inner moon of the dwarf planet Haumea, Namaka, is one tenth the mass of the larger outer moon, Hiʻiaka. Namaka revolves around Haumea in 18 days in an eccentric, non-Keplerian orbit, and as of 2008 is inclined 13° from Hiʻiaka. Over the timescale of the system, it should have been tidally damped into a more circular orbit. It appears that it has been disturbed by resonances with the more massive Hiʻiaka, due to converging orbits as it moved outward from Haumea because of tidal dissipation. The moons may have been caught in and then escaped from orbital resonance several times. They probably passed through the 3:1 resonance relatively recently, and currently are in or at least close to an 8:3 resonance. Namaka's orbit is strongly perturbed, with a current precession of about −6.5° per year.

== See also ==
- 1685 Toro, an asteroid in 5:8 resonance with the Earth
- 3753 Cruithne, an asteroid in 1:1 resonance with the Earth
- Arnold tongue
- Commensurability (astronomy)
- Dermott's law
- Horseshoe orbit, followed by an object in another type of 1:1 resonance
- Kozai resonance
- Lagrange points
- Mercury, which has a 3:2 spin-orbit resonance
- Musica universalis ("music of the spheres")
- Resonant interaction
- Resonant trans-Neptunian object
- Tidal locking
- Tidal resonance
- Titius–Bode law
- Transfer operator
- Trojan (celestial body), a body in a type of 1:1 resonance
- Venus, whose Earth conjunction period (584 Earth days) is close to 5 times its solar day (116.75 days)
