= Haumea (disambiguation) =

Haumea is a dwarf planet in the Kuiper belt located beyond Neptune's orbit.

Haumea may also refer to:

- Haumea (mythology), a goddess of fertility and childbirth in Hawaiian mythology
- Haumea (bivalve), a genus of bivalves in the family Pectinidae
- Haumea family, the only collisional family in the Kuiper belt; objects that are thought to have similar origins due to similar orbits and spectra
- Haumea I and Haumea II, formal designations of Haumea's moons Hiʻiaka and Namaka, respectively
