= 22 Kalliope =

Main-belt asteroid

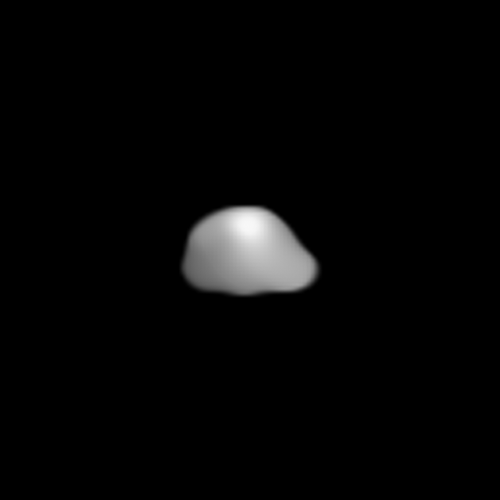
- 22 Kalliope imaged by the Very Large Telescope's adaptive optics system in August 2019

Discovery
- Discovered by: John Russell Hind
- Discovery date: 16 November 1852

Designations
- Pronunciation: /kəˈlaɪ.əpi/ kə-LY-ə-pee
- Named after: Καλλιόπη Kalliopē
- Minor planet category: Main belt
- Adjectives: Kalliopean /kəˌlaɪ.əˈpiːən/ kə-LY-ə-PEE-ən

Orbital characteristics
- Epoch 23 July 2010 (JD 2455400.5)
- Aphelion: 479.98 million km (3.2085 AU)
- Perihelion: 391.03 million km (2.6139 AU)
- Semi-major axis: 435.09 million km (2.9112 AU)
- Eccentricity: 0.10213
- Orbital period (sidereal): 1814.3 d (4.97 yr)
- Mean anomaly: 282.54°
- Inclination: 13.703°
- Longitude of ascending node: 66.17°
- Time of perihelion: 27 July 2026
- Argument of perihelion: 355.03°
- Known satellites: Linus

Physical characteristics
- Dimensions: 207 × 145 × 122 km (± 5 × 4 × 4 km)
- Mean diameter: 150±5 km
- Mass: (7.89±0.09)×10^{18} kg (composite estimate)
- Mean density: 4.40±0.46 g/cm^{3}
- Synodic rotation period: 4.148200(1) h
- Axial tilt: 97°
- Pole ecliptic longitude: 195±3°
- Pole ecliptic latitude: 4±3°
- Geometric albedo: 0.166 ± 0.005; 0.198; 0.17
- Spectral type: M (Tholen); X (SMASS); X (Bus-DeMeo)
- Absolute magnitude (H): 6.45; 6.79

22 Kalliope (/kəˈlaɪ.əpi/; kə-LY-ə-pee) is a large M-type asteroid from the asteroid belt discovered by J. R. Hind on 16 November 1852. It is named after Calliope, the Greek Muse of epic poetry. It is orbited by a small moon named Linus.

== Characteristics ==
Kalliope is somewhat elongated, approximately 166 km in diameter, and slightly asymmetric, as evidenced by resolved images taken with the VLT at the European Southern Observatory. This new diameter, which was measured by observing mutual eclipses of Kalliope and Linus, is 8% smaller than that calculated from IRAS observations.

The spectrum of Kalliope is an M-type, indicating that its surface may be partially composed of iron–nickel metal. The asteroid's density is about 3.4 g/cm^{3}. Since the asteroid is likely to be a rubble pile, accounting for a possible porosity of 20–40% leads to the material density of 4.2–5.8 g/cm^{3}, which means that Kalliope is probably made of a mixture of metal with silicates. Spectroscopic studies have shown, however, evidence of hydrated minerals and silicates, which indicate rather a stony surface composition. Kalliope also has a low radar albedo, which is inconsistent with a purely metallic surface.

Lightcurve analysis indicates that Kalliope's pole most likely points towards ecliptic coordinates (β, λ) = (−23°, 20°) with a 10° uncertainty, which gives Kalliope an axial tilt of 103°. Kalliope's rotation is then slightly retrograde.

Between 2004 and 2021, 22 Kalliope has been observed to occult fifteen stars.

In 2022, it was discovered that 22 Kalliope is part of an asteroid family that formed about 900 million years ago. Its moon, Linus, may have been formed at the same time.

== Satellite ==
Kalliope has one known natural satellite, designated (22) Kalliope I and named Linus. It is quite large – about 28 km in diameter – and would be a sizeable asteroid by itself. It orbits about 1100 km from the center of Kalliope, equivalent to about 13.2 Kalliope radii. Linus was discovered on 29 August 2001 by Jean-Luc Margot and Michael E. Brown, while another team led by William Merline also independently detected the moon 3 days later.

== First stellar occultation ==
On 7 November 2006, the first stellar occultation by the satellite of an asteroid (Linus) was successfully observed by a group of Japanese observers according to a prediction that was made just one day before by Berthier et al. based on more than 5 years of regular observations of Kalliope binary system using adaptive optics systems on ground-based telescopes. The observed chords of Linus gave a unique opportunity to estimate the size of the moonlet which was estimated to 20–28 km.
