= M-type asteroid =

Asteroid spectral type

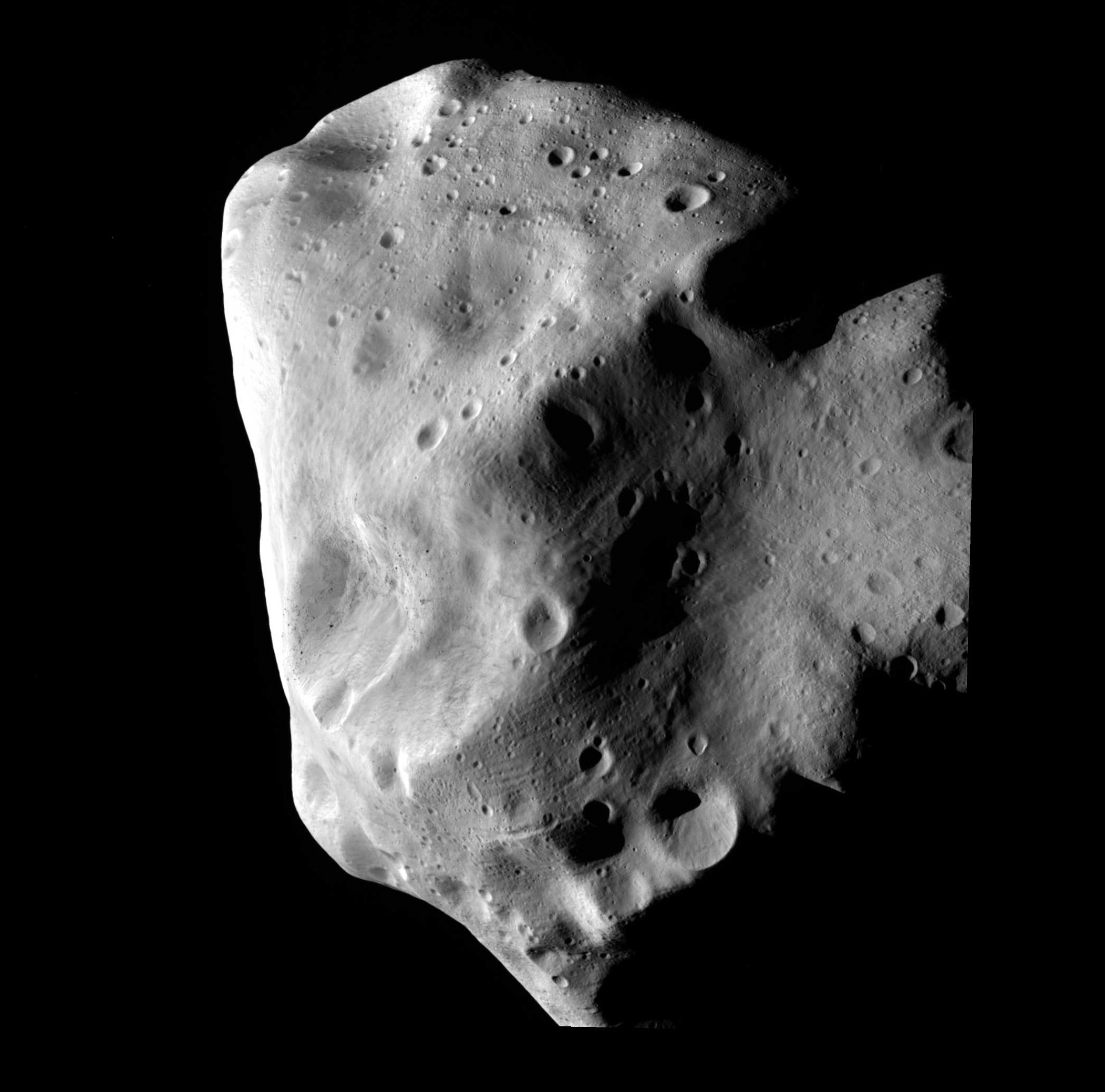
Image of the M-type asteroid 21 Lutetia taken by the ESA Rosetta Spacecraft during a flyby in 2010

M-type (metallic-type, a.k.a. M-class) asteroids are a spectral class of asteroids which appear to contain higher concentrations of metal phases (e.g. iron-nickel) than other asteroid classes, and are widely thought to be the source of iron meteorites.

== Definition ==
Asteroids are classified as M-type based upon their generally featureless and flat to red-sloped absorption spectra in the visible to near-infrared and their moderate optical albedo. Along with the spectrally similar E-type and P-type asteroids (both categories E and P were formerly type-M in older systems), they are included in the larger X-type asteroid group and are distinguishable only by optical albedo:

| P-type | albedo < 0.1 |
| M-type | albedo in 0.1 ... 0.3 |
| E-type | albedo > 0.3 |

== Characteristics ==
=== Composition ===
Although widely assumed to be metal-rich (the reason for use of "M" in the classification), the evidence for a high metal content in the M-type asteroids is only indirect, though highly plausible. Their spectra are similar to those of iron meteorites and enstatite chondrites, and radar observations have shown that their radar albedos are much higher than other asteroid classes, consistent with the presence of higher density compositions like iron-nickel. Nearly all of the M-types have radar albedos at least twice as high as the more common S- and C-type, and roughly one-third have radar albedos ~3× higher.

High resolution spectra of the M-type have sometimes shown subtle features longward of 0.75 μm and shortward of 0.55 μm. The presence of silicates is evident in many, and a significant fraction show evidence of absorption features at 3 μm, attributed to hydrated silicates. The presence of silicates, and especially hydrated silicates, is at odds with the traditional interpretation of M-types as remnant iron cores.

Possible meteorite analogs for M-type asteroids.

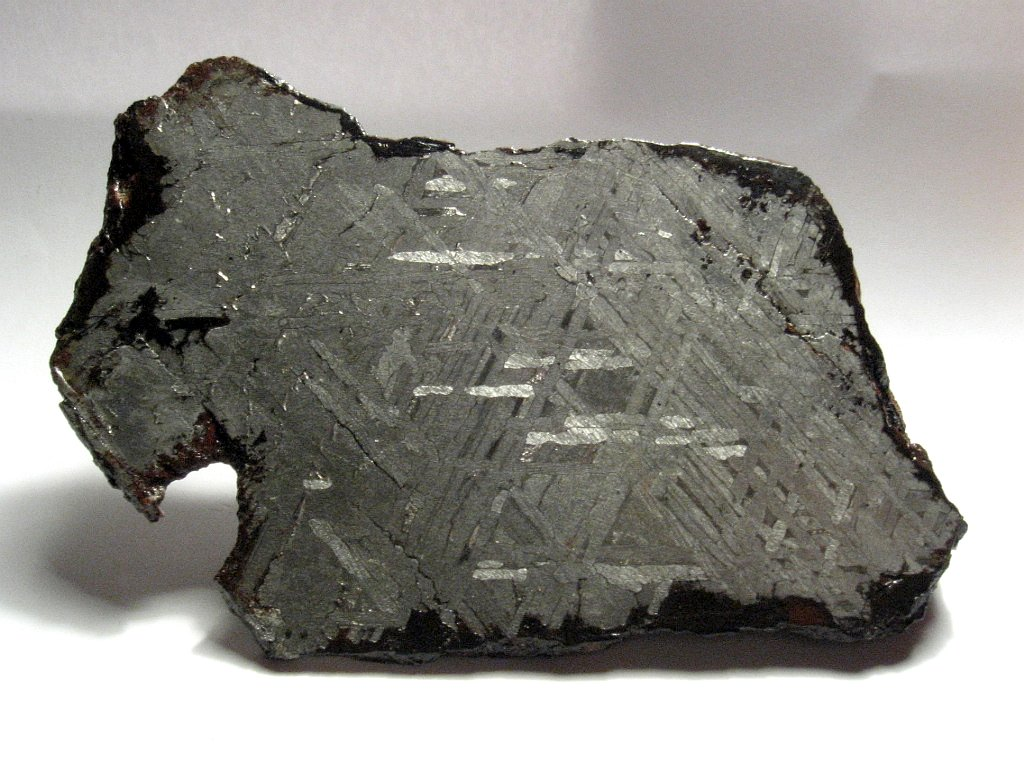
An iron–nickel meteorite with characteristic Widmanstätten pattern.

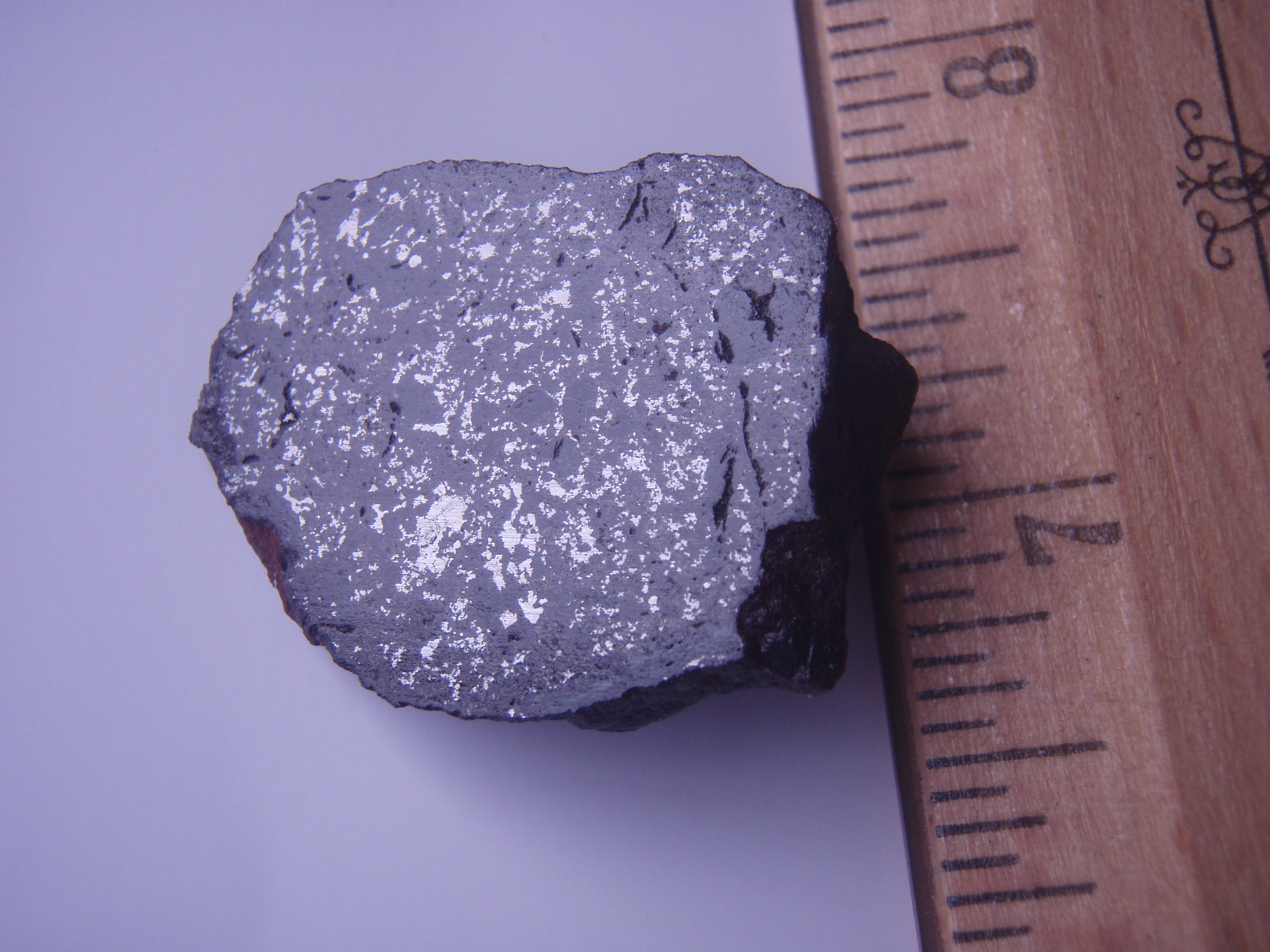
A mesosiderite showing a mixture of metals and silicates.

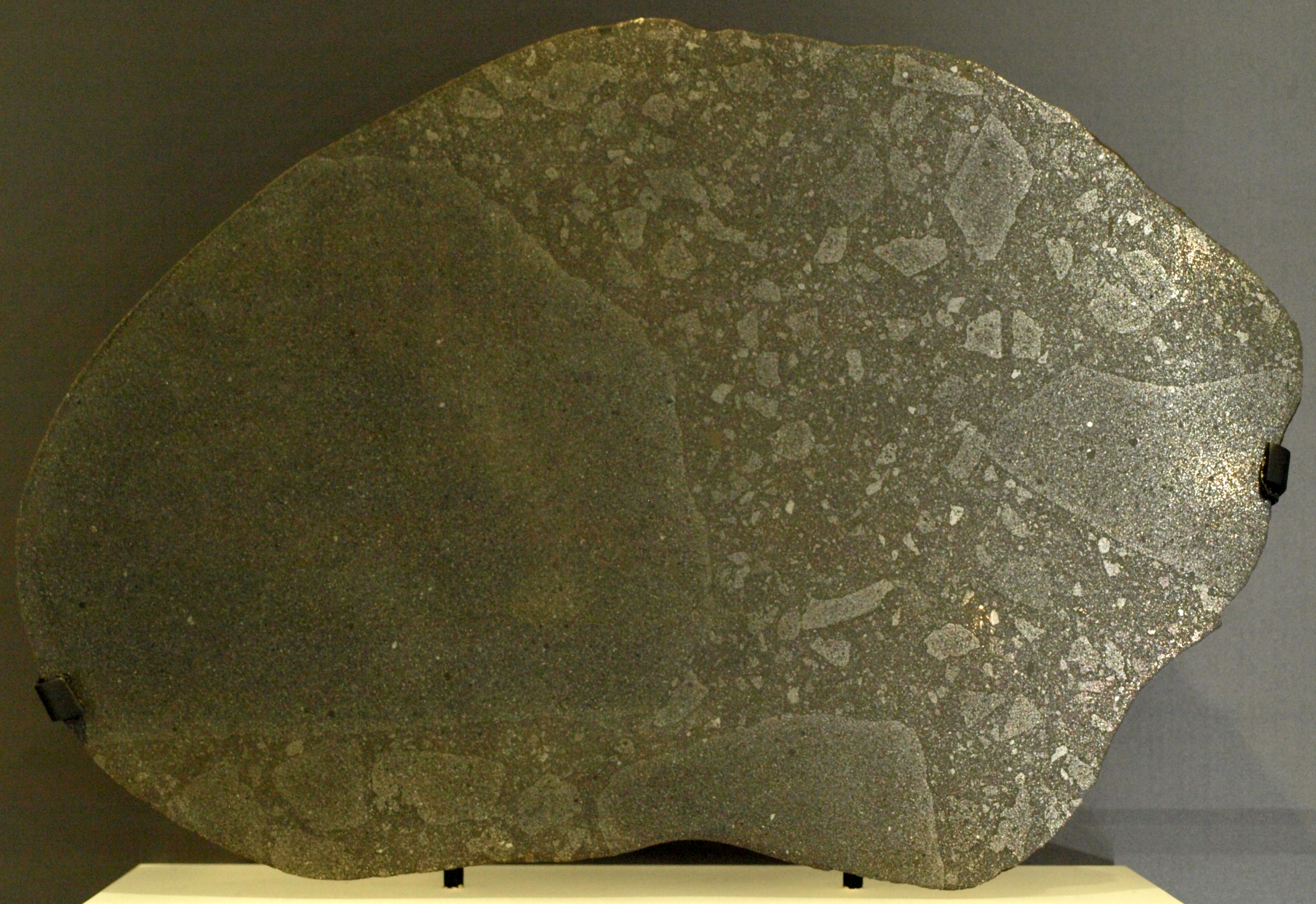
An enstatite chondrite displaying a mix of metals and silicates (enstatite).

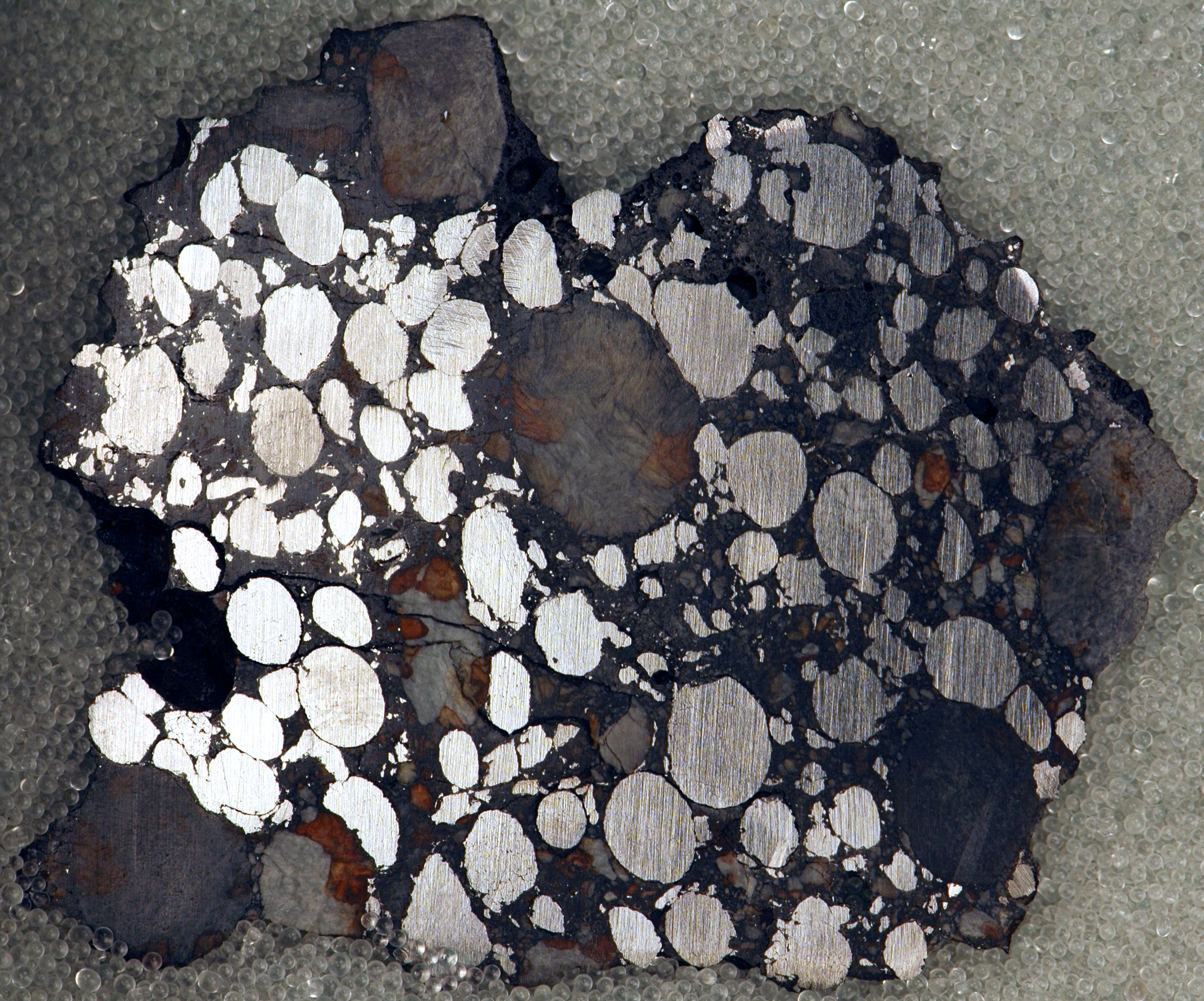
A metal-rich carbonaceous chondrite, or bencubbinite.

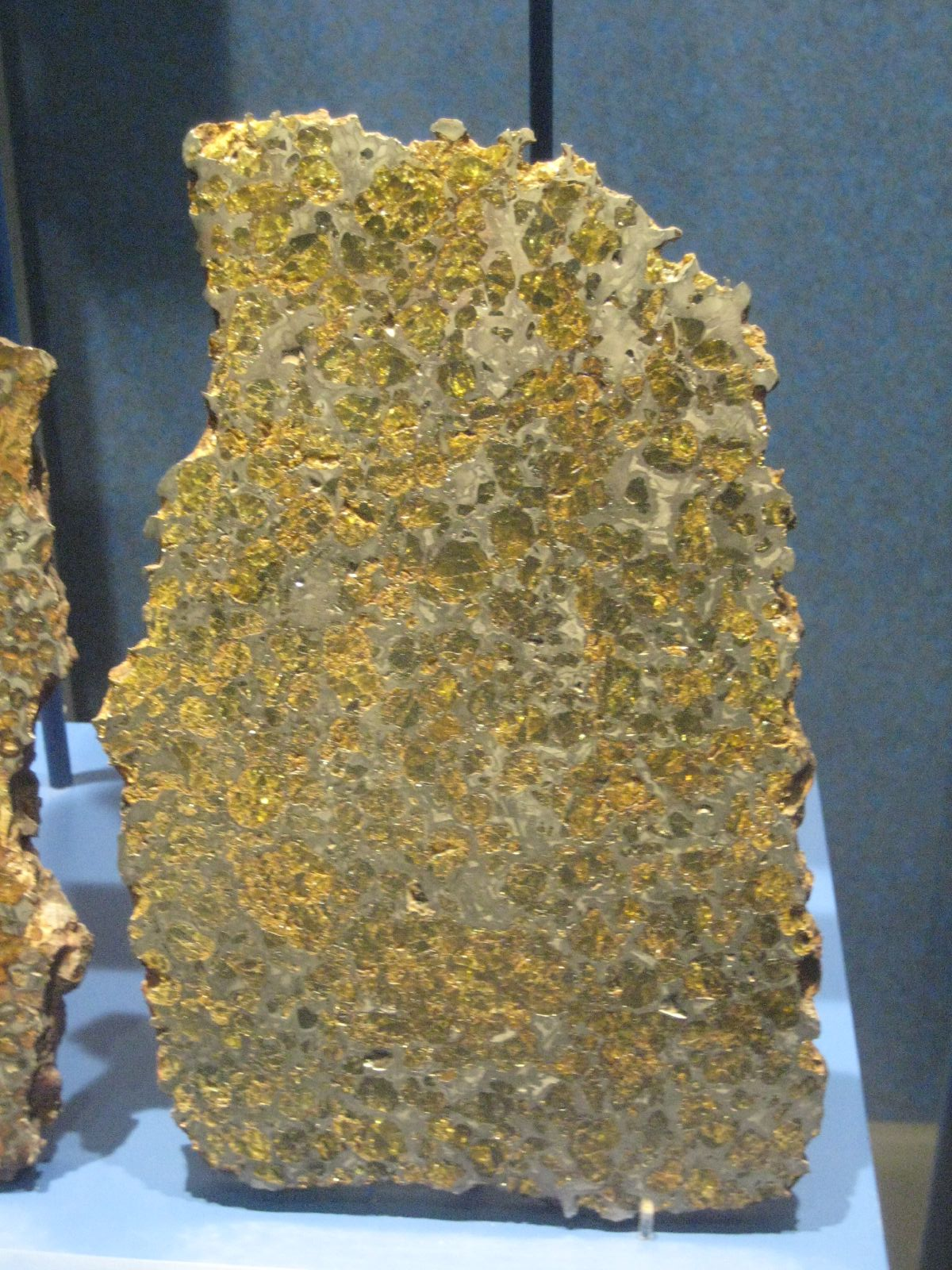
A stony-iron pallasite, composited of iron-nickel and olivine.

=== Bulk density and porosity ===
The bulk density of an asteroid provides clues about its composition and meteoritic analogs. For the M-types, the proposed analogs have bulk densities that range from ~3 g/cm^{3} for some types of carbonaceous chondrites up to nearly 8 g/cm^{3} for the iron-nickel present in iron-meteorites. Given the bulk density of an asteroid and the density of the materials that make it up (a.k.a. particle or grain density), one can calculate its porosity and infer something of its internal structure; for example, whether an object is coherent, a rubble pile, or something in-between.

To calculate the bulk density of an asteroid requires an accurate estimate of its mass and volume; both of these are difficult to obtain given their small size relative to other Solar System objects. In the case of the larger asteroids, one can estimate mass by observing how their gravitational field affects other objects, including other asteroids and orbiting or flyby spacecraft. If an asteroid possesses one or more moons, one can use their collective orbital parameters (e.g. orbital period, semimajor axis) to estimate the masses of the ensemble, for example in the two-body problem.

To estimate an asteroid's volume requires, at a minimum, an estimate of an asteroid's diameter. In most cases, these are estimated from the visual albedo (brightness) of the asteroid, chord-lengths during occultations, or their thermal emissions (e.g. IRAS mission). In a few cases, astronomers have managed to develop three-dimensional shape models using a variety of techniques (cf. 16 Psyche or 216 Kleopatra for examples) or, in a few lucky instances, from spacecraft imaging (cf. 162173 Ryugu).

| Asteroid | Density | Radar Albedo | Method (mass, size) |
|---|---|---|---|
| 16 Psyche | 3.8 ± 0.3 | 0.34 ± 0.08 | Ephemeris, shape model |
| 21 Lutetia | 3.4 ± 0.3 | 0.24 ± 0.07 | Rosetta spacecraft flyby, direct imaging |
| 22 Kalliope | 4.1 ± 0.5 | 0.15 ± 0.05 | Orbit of its moon Linus, shape model |
| 69 Hesperia | 4.4 ± 1.0 | 0.45 ± 0.12 | Ephemeris, thermal IR/radar size estimate |
| 92 Undina | 4.4 ± 0.4 | 0.38 ± 0.09 | Ephemeris, thermal IR/radar size estimate |
| 129 Antigone | 3.0 ± 1.0 | 0.36 ± 0.09 | Ephemeris, thermal IR/radar size estimate |
| 216 Kleopatra | 3.4 ± 0.5 | 0.43 ± 0.10 | Orbits of its two moons, shape model |

Of these, mass measurements made via spacecraft deflection or the orbits of moons are considered the most reliable. Ephemeris estimates are based on the subtle gravitational pull of other objects on that asteroid, or vice versa, and are considered less reliable. The exception to this caveat may be Psyche, as it is the most massive M-type asteroid and has numerous mass estimates. Size estimates based on shape models (usually derived from adaptive optics, occultations, and radar imaging) are the most reliable. Direct spacecraft imaging (Lutetia) is also quite reliable. Sizes based on indirect methods like thermal IR (e.g. IRAS) and radar echoes are less reliable.

None of the M-type asteroids have bulk densities consistent with a pure iron-nickel core. If these objects are porous (a.k.a. rubble-piles), then that interpretation may still hold; this is unlikely for Psyche, because of its large size. Given the spectral evidence of silicates on most M-type asteroids, the consensus interpretation for most of these larger asteroids is that they are composed of lower density meteorite analogs (e.g. enstatite chondrites, metal-rich carbonaceous chondrites, mesosiderites), and in some cases may also be rubble piles.

== Formation ==
The earliest interpretation of the M-type asteroids was that they were the remnant cores of early protoplanets, stripped of their overlying crust and mantles by massive collisions that are thought to have been frequent in the early history of the Solar System.

It is acknowledged that some of the smaller M-type asteroids (<100 km) may have formed in this way, but that interpretation was challenged for 16 Psyche, the largest of the M-type asteroids. There are three arguments against Psyche forming in this way. First, it must have started as a Vesta-sized (~500 km) protoplanet; statistically, it is unlikely that Psyche was completely disrupted while Vesta remained intact. Second, there is little or no observational evidence for an asteroid family associated with Psyche, and third, there is no spectroscopic evidence for the expected mantle fragments (i.e. olivine) that would have resulted from this event. Instead, it has been argued that Psyche is the remnant of a protoplanet that was shattered and gravitationally re-accumulated into a well-mixed iron-silicate object. There are numerous examples of metal-silicate meteorites, a.k.a. mesosiderites, that might be objects from such a parent body.

One possible response to this second interpretation is that the M-type asteroids (including 16 Psyche) accumulated much closer to the Sun (1–2 au), were stripped of their thin crust/mantles while still molten (or partially so), and later dynamically moved into the current asteroid belt.

A third view is that the largest M-types, including 16 Psyche, may be differentiated bodies (like 1 Ceres and 4 Vesta) but, given the right mix of iron and volatiles (e.g. sulfur), these bodies may have experienced a type of iron volcanism, a.k.a. ferrovolcanism, while still cooling.

== Notable examples ==
In the JPL Small Body Database, there are 980 asteroids classified under the Tholen asteroid spectral classification system. Of those, 38 are classified as M-type. Another 10 were originally classified as X-type, but are now counted among the M-types because their optical albedos fall between 0.1 and 0.3. Overall, the M-types make up approximately 5% of the asteroids classified under the Tholen taxonomy.

=== (16) Psyche ===
16 Psyche is the largest M-type asteroid with a mean diameter of 222 km, and has a relatively high mean radar albedo of $\hat{\sigma}_{OC}=0.34 \pm 0.08$ suggesting it has a high metal content in the upper few meters of its surface. The Psyche spacecraft, launched on October 13, 2023, is en route to visit 16 Psyche, arriving in 2029.

=== (21) Lutetia ===
21 Lutetia has a mean diameter of 100 km, and was the first M-type asteroid to have been imaged by a spacecraft when the Rosetta space probe visited it on 10 July 2010. Its mean radar albedo of $\hat{\sigma}_{OC}=0.24 \pm 0.07$ is roughly twice that of the average S-type or C-type asteroid, and suggests its regolith contains an elevated amount of metal phases relative to other asteroid classes. Analysis using data from the Rosetta spectrometer (VIRTIS) was consistent with estatitic or iron-rich carbonaceous chondritic materials.

=== (22) Kalliope ===
22 Kalliope is the second largest M-type asteroid with a mean diameter of 150 km. A single moon, named Linus, was discovered in 2001 and allows for an accurate mass estimate. Unlike most of the M-type asteroids, Kalliope's radar albedo is 0.15, similar to the S- and C-type asteroids, and does not suggest an enrichment of metal in its regolith. It has been the target of high resolution adaptive optics imaging which has been used to provide a reliable size and shape, and a relatively high bulk density of 4.1 g/cm^{3}.

=== (216) Kleopatra ===
216 Kleopatra, with a mean diameter of 122 km, is the third largest M-type asteroid known after 16 Psyche and 22 Kalliope. Radar delay-Doppler imaging, high-resolution telescopic images, and several stellar occultations show it to be a contact binary asteroid with a shape commonly referred to as a "dog-bone" or "dumbbell." Radar observations from the Arecibo radar telescope indicate a very high radar albedo of $\hat{\sigma}_{OC}=0.43 \pm 0.10$ in the southern hemisphere, consistent with a metal-rich composition. Kleopatra is also notable for the presence of two small moons, named Alexhelios and Cleoselene, which have allowed its mass and bulk density to be accurately computed.

== See also ==
- Asteroid spectral types
