= Linus (moon) =

Asteroid moon that orbits 22 Kalliope

- Kalliope and satellite Linus as seen by the W.M. Keck II telescope in 2010

Discovery
- Discovered by: Jean-Luc Margot and Michael E. Brown
- Discovery date: August 29, 2001

Designations
- Pronunciation: /ˈlaɪnəs/
- Named after: Linus
- Alternative designations: S/2001 (22) 1
- Minor planet category: Main belt
- Adjectives: Linian /ˈlɪniən/

Orbital characteristics
- Semi-major axis: 1063 ± 23 km (1040-1086) 1099 ± 11 km (1088-1110)
- Eccentricity: <0.015 <0.005
- Orbital period (sidereal): 3.596 ± 0.040 d (3.556-3.636) 3.590 ± 0.001 d (3.589-3.591)
- Average orbital speed: 21.5 m/s
- Inclination: ~0° (undetectable with respect to Kalliope equator)
- Satellite of: 22 Kalliope

Physical characteristics
- Dimensions: 28 ± 2 km
- Mass: ~6×10^{16} kg (estimate) ~4×10^{16} kg (estimate)
- Mean density: 3.4 g/cm^{3} (assumed)
- Equatorial escape velocity: ~20 m/s (estimate)
- Synodic rotation period: unknown, probably synchronous
- Axial tilt: unknown, zero expected
Surface temp.	min	mean	max
Kelvin		~161	240
Celsius		~ -113	−32°
- Absolute magnitude (H): 9.7

Linus, formal designation (22) Kalliope I, is an asteroid moon that orbits the large M-type asteroid 22 Kalliope. It was discovered on August 29, 2001, by astronomers Jean-Luc Margot and Michael E. Brown with the Keck telescope, in Hawaii. Another team also detected the moon with the Canada-France-Hawaii Telescope on September 2, 2001. Both telescopes are on Mauna Kea. It received the provisional designation S/2001 (22) 1, until it was named. The naming proposal appeared in the discovery paper and was approved by the International Astronomical Union in July 2003. Although the naming proposal referred to the mythological Linus, son of the muse Calliope and the inventor of melody and rhythm, the name was also meant to honor Linus Torvalds, inventor of the Linux operating system kernel, and Linus van Pelt, a character in the Peanuts comic strip.

With an estimated 28 ± 2 km (17 ± 1 mi) diameter, Linus is very large compared to most asteroid moons, and would be a sizable asteroid by itself. The only known larger moons in the main belt are the smaller components of the double asteroids 617 Patroclus and 90 Antiope.

It has been estimated that Linus' orbit precesses at quite a rapid rate, making one cycle in several years. This is attributed primarily to the non-spherical shape of Kalliope. Linus's brightness has varied appreciably between observations, which may indicate that its shape is elongated.

Linus may have formed out of impact ejecta from a collision with Kalliope, or a fragment captured after disruption of a parent asteroid (a proto-Kalliope).
