= 87 Sylvia =

Large asteroid with two moons

- VLT-SPHERE image of Sylvia

Discovery
- Discovered by: Norman Robert Pogson
- Discovery date: 16 May 1866

Designations
- Pronunciation: /ˈsɪlviə/ SIL-vee-ə
- Named after: Rhea Silvia
- Alternative designations: A909 GA
- Minor planet category: main belt · (outside core); Sylvia · Cybele
- Adjectives: Sylvian (/ˈsɪlviən/ SIL-vee-ən)

Orbital characteristics
- Epoch 1 July 2021 (JD 2459396.5, heliocentric)
- Aphelion: 3.81 AU (560 million km)
- Perihelion: 3.15 AU (480 million km)
- Semi-major axis: 3.48 AU (520 million km)
- Eccentricity: 0.094
- Orbital period (sidereal): 6.5 a (2372 d)
- Average orbital speed: 15.94 km/s
- Mean anomaly: 213°
- Mean motion: 0° 9^{m} 6.48^{s} / day
- Inclination: 10.9°
- Longitude of ascending node: 73°
- Argument of perihelion: 263°
- Known satellites: 2

Physical characteristics
- Dimensions: (363 × 249 × 191) ±5 km (MPCD) or (374 × 248 × 194) ±5 km (ADAM)
- Mean diameter: 271±5 km (MPCD) or 274±5 km (ADAM)
- Volume: (10.5±0.2)×10^{7} km^{3} (MPCD) or (10.8±0.2)×10^{7} km^{3} (ADAM)
- Mass: (1.44±0.01)×10^{19} kg
- Mean density: 1.378±0.045 g/cm^{3}
- Synodic rotation period: 0.2160 d (5.183641±0.000039 h)
- Axial tilt: 28°
- North pole right ascension: 14.3°±5°
- North pole declination: +83.5°±5°
- Pole ecliptic longitude: 75.3°±5°
- Pole ecliptic latitude: +64.2°±5°
- Geometric albedo: 0.04; 0.046 ± 0.004
- Spectral type: P/X
- Absolute magnitude (H): 6.94; 6.93

87 Sylvia is one of the largest asteroids (approximately tied for 7th place, to within measurement uncertainties). It is the parent body of the Sylvia family and member of Cybele group located beyond the main asteroid belt (see minor-planet groups). Sylvia was the first asteroid known to possess more than one moon.

== Discovery and naming ==
Sylvia was discovered by N. R. Pogson on 16 May 1866, from Madras (Chennai), India. Antonio Paluzie-Borrell, writing in Paul Herget's The Names of the Minor Planets (1955), mistakenly states that the name honors Sylvie Petiaux-Hugo Flammarion, the first wife of astronomer Camille Flammarion. In fact, in the article announcing the discovery of the asteroid, Pogson explained that he selected the name in reference to Rhea Silvia, mother of Romulus and Remus (MNRAS, 1866).

== Physical characteristics ==
Sylvia is very dark in color and probably has a primitive composition, though with some internal differentiation. The discovery of its moons made possible an accurate measurement of the asteroid's mass, density and mass distribution. Its density is low (around 1.4 times the density of water), indicating that the asteroid is porous; best-fit models estimate it had an original composition by volume of 35% rock, 13% ice and 52% internal voids, and that today it consists of a pristine anhydrous outer layer, and a differentiated interior, with meltwater having percolated inward so that the porosity of the rock is filled with ice out to a radius of about 46 km, then ice-free porous rock out to about 104 km.

Sylvia is a fairly fast rotator, turning about its axis every 5.2 hours, giving it an equatorial rotation velocity of about 65 m/s, almost half the escape velocity.

Sylvia's shape is flattened and elongated (a/b ≈ 1.45; a/c ≈ 1.84) and somewhat irregular. However, its surface has not been imaged well enough for individual features to be resolved.

== Satellite system ==
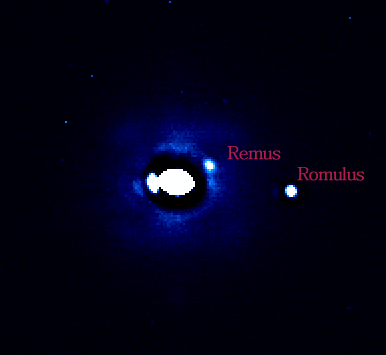
Adaptive Optics observations of (87) Sylvia, showing its two satellites, Remus and Romulus.

Sylvia has two orbiting satellites. They have been named Romulus and Remus, after Romulus and Remus, the children of the mythological Rhea Silvia.

Romulus, the first moon, was discovered on 18 February 2001, from the Keck II telescope by Michael E. Brown and Jean-Luc Margot. Remus, the second moon, was discovered over three years later on 9 August 2004, by Franck Marchis of UC Berkeley, and Pascal Descamps, Daniel Hestroffer, and Jérôme Berthier of the Observatoire de Paris, France.

The orbital properties of the satellites are listed in this table. (Note: Errors were published as 3 sigma. To maintain consistency with the table for Sylvia, they have here been reduced to 1 sigma.) The orbital planes of both satellites and the equatorial plane of the primary asteroid are all well-aligned. Diameters are estimates based on the assumption that the moons have the same albedo as their primary.

Name	Mass [kg]	Diameter [km]	Semi-major axis [km]	Orbital period [days]	Eccentricity	Inclination [°]
Remus	(0.8±0.2)×10^{15}	10+17 −6	694.2±0.1	1.3570±0.0003	0.005+0.010 −0.002	8.7±1.8
Romulus	(1.4±0.4)×10^{15}	23.1±0.7	1340.6±0.4	3.64126±0.00002	0.000+0.003 −0.000	7.4±0.5

== See also ==
- List of exceptional asteroids
