= 69 Hesperia =

Main-belt asteroid

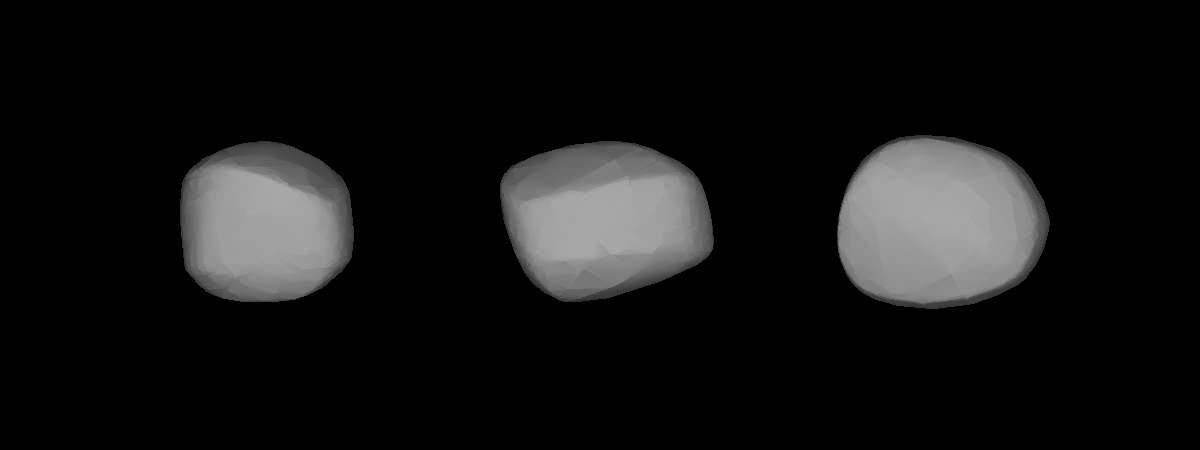
- A three-dimensional model of 69 Hesperia based on its lightcurve

Discovery
- Discovered by: G. Schiaparelli
- Discovery date: April 29, 1861

Designations
- Pronunciation: /hɛˈspɪəriə/
- Named after: Hesperia
- Minor planet category: Main belt
- Adjectives: Hesperian /hɛˈspɪəriən/

Orbital characteristics
- Epoch (absent)
- Aphelion: 3.471 AU (519.3 Gm)
- Perihelion: 2.489 AU (372.3 Gm)
- Semi-major axis: 2.980 AU (445.8 Gm)
- Eccentricity: 0.165
- Orbital period (sidereal): 1,879 days (5.14 a)
- Inclination: 8.59°
- Longitude of ascending node: 184.99°
- Argument of perihelion: 288.8°

Physical characteristics
- Dimensions: 135 × 106 × 98 km
- Mean diameter: 110±15 km
- Mass: (4.36±0.31)×10^{18} kg (Note: Calculated from its standard gravitational parameter GM = 0.291±0.021 km^{3}/s^{2}.)
- Mean density: 6.26±2.60 g/cm^{3} (calculated)
- Synodic rotation period: 5.655 h
- Pole ecliptic longitude: 250° or 71°
- Pole ecliptic latitude: 17° or −2°
- Geometric albedo: 0.1402 ± 0.010
- Spectral type: M
- Absolute magnitude (H): 7.21

69 Hesperia is a large, M-type main-belt asteroid. It was discovered by the Italian astronomer Giovanni Schiaparelli on April 29, 1861 from Milan, while he was searching for the recently discovered 63 Ausonia. It was his only asteroid discovery. Schiaparelli named it Hesperia in honour of Italy (the word is a Greek term for the peninsula). The asteroid is orbiting the Sun with a period of 5.14 years, a semimajor axis of 2.980 AU, and eccentricity of 0.165. The orbital plane is inclined by an angle of 8.59° to the plane of the ecliptic.

Hesperia was observed by Arecibo radar in February 2010. Radar observations combined with lightcurve-based shape models, lead to a diameter estimate of 110 ± 15 km (68 ± 9.3 mi). The radar albedo is consistent with a high-metal M-type asteroid. In the near infrared, a weak absorption feature near a wavelength of 0.9 μm can be attributed to orthopyroxenes on the surface. A meteorite analogue of the reflectance spectra from 69 Hesperia is the Hoba ataxite.
