= Commensurability (astronomy) =

Proportionality of orbital periods for two celestial bodies

Commensurability is the property of two orbiting objects, such as planets, satellites, or asteroids, whose orbital periods are in a rational proportion.

Examples include the 2:3 commensurability between the orbital periods of Neptune and Pluto, the 3:4 commensurability between the orbital periods of the Saturnian satellites Titan and Hyperion, the orbital periods associated with the Kirkwood gaps in the asteroid belt relative to that of Jupiter, and the 2:1 commensurability between Gliese 876 b and Gliese 876 c.

Commensurabilities are normally the result of an orbital resonance, rather than being due to coincidence.

== See also ==
- Harmonic
- Ratio
