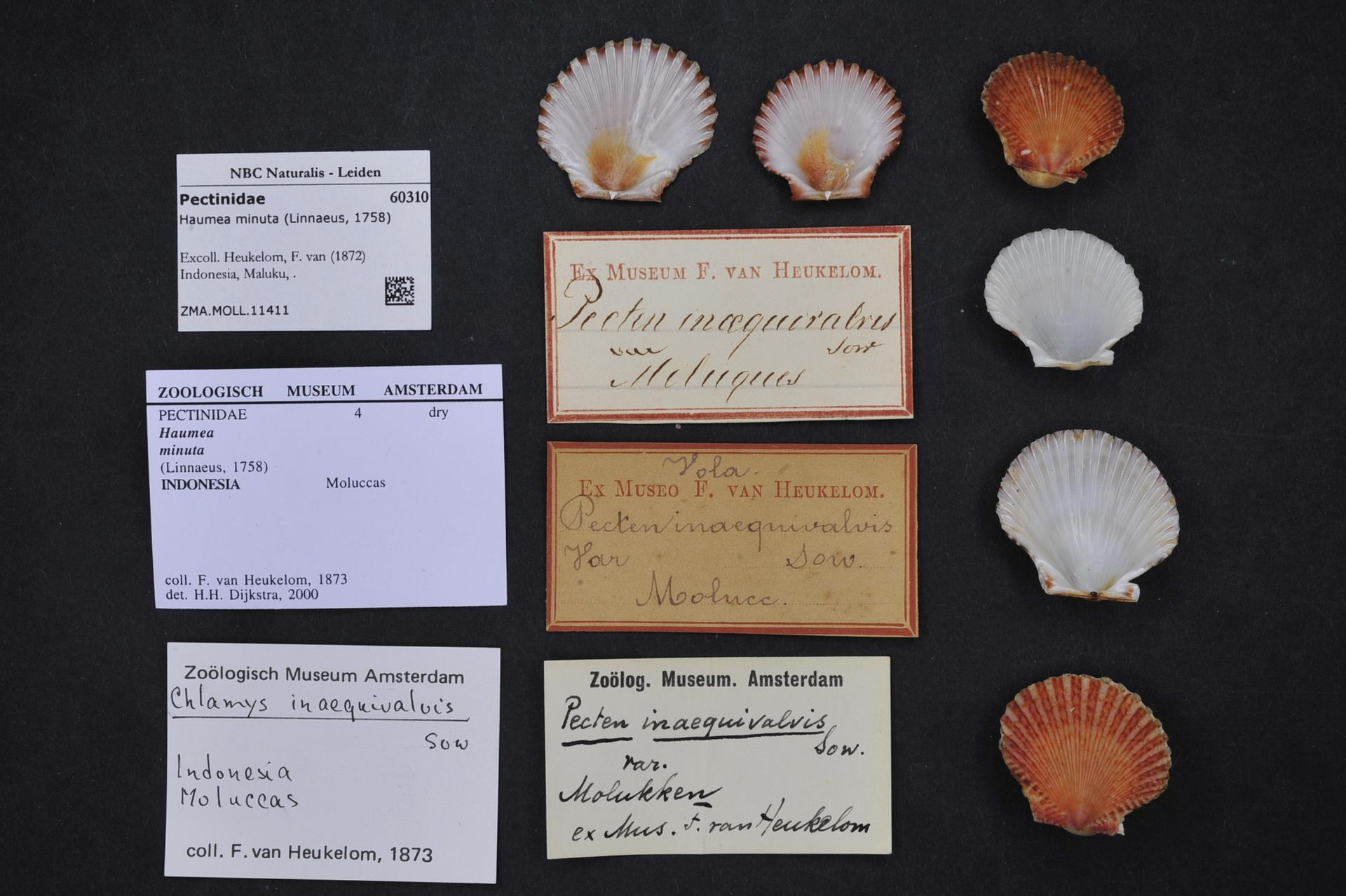
- Haumea minuta

Scientific classification
- Kingdom: Animalia
- Phylum: Mollusca
- Class: Bivalvia
- Order: Pectinida
- Family: Pectinidae
- Genus: Haumea; Dall, Bartsch & Rehder, 1938

= Haumea (bivalve) =

Genus of bivalves

Haumea is a genus of bivalves belonging to the family Pectinidae.

The species of this genus are found in the Indian and Pacific Oceans.

Species:

- Haumea loxoides (Sowerby Iii, 1882)
- Haumea minuta (Linnaeus, 1758)
- Haumea rehderi (Grau, 1960)
