= Namaka (moon) =

Smaller moon of Haumea

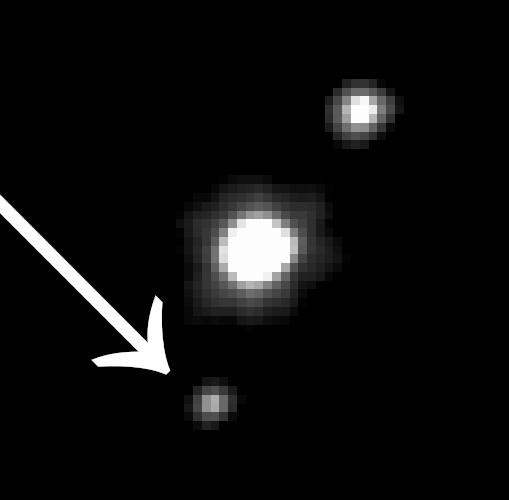
- In this photo taken by the Hubble Space Telescope, Namaka is the faint spot near the bottom, directly below Haumea (center).

Discovery
- Discovered by: Michael E. Brown; Keck Observatory adaptive optics team
- Discovery site: W. M. Keck Obs., Mauna Kea
- Discovery date: 2005 (Note: No specific discovery date is given because different sources give different discovery dates. NASA/JPL simply gives "2005" as Namaka's discovery year, the IAU Circular discovery announcement states Namaka was found in images from "Mar. 1, May 27, and June 29," the USGS states Namaka's discovery date is "November 7, 2005," and Johnston's Archive states Namaka's discovery date is "2005 June 30." Michael Brown, discoverer of Namaka, wrote in a 2008 blog post that it was discovered in "the fall of 2005.")

Designations
- Designation: (136108) Haumea II
- Pronunciation: /nɑːˈmɑːkə/ Hawaiian: [naːˈmɐkə]
- Named after: Nāmaka
- Alternative names: S/2005 (2003 EL_{61}) 2 S/2005 (136108) 2

Orbital characteristics (Note: The orbital elements listed in the infobox are time-averaged non-Keplerian orbital elements, which are derived from 2006–2015 Hubble Space Telescope (HST) observations. These are listed as "HST-only fit" elements in Proudfoot et al. (2024), who found that the HST-only fit has the lowest systematic observational errors compared to the orbital elements derived from combined HST and Keck telescope observations.)
- Epoch 28 May 2008 12:00 UT (JD 2454615.0)
- Semi-major axis: 25506±36 km
- Eccentricity: 0.2179+0.0033 −0.0032
- Orbital period (sidereal): 18.2783±0.0076 d
- Mean anomaly: 185.19°+0.69° −0.65°
- Inclination: 69.005°+0.108° −0.107° (to ecliptic); 12.79°+1.01° −0.58° (to Haumea's equator); 13.2°±0.2° (to Hiʻiaka's orbital plane)
- Longitude of ascending node: 23.725°+0.149° −0.150° (to ecliptic)
- Argument of periapsis: 118.35°+0.39° −0.42°
- Satellite of: Haumea

Physical characteristics
- Mean diameter: 150±50 km ≥ 83±2 km (occultation)
- Mass: (1.18±0.25)×10^{18} kg
- Mean density: ~0.65 g/cm^{3} (for 150 km diameter)
- Synodic rotation period: unknown, likely chaotic
- Axial tilt: unknown, likely chaotic
- Albedo: 0.5 to 0.8
- Temperature: ≈40 K (same as Haumea)
- Apparent magnitude: ~22 (Note: The brightness difference between Namaka and Haumea in visible light is 5.1 magnitudes. Observations in the Minor Planet Center's database give a visible light apparent magnitude of around 17 for Haumea; adding Namaka's magnitude difference (with uncertainties) to Haumea's apparent magnitude gives an apparent magnitude of 22.)
- Absolute magnitude (H): 5.1

Namaka (full designation (136108) Haumea II) is the smaller, inner moon of the trans-Neptunian dwarf planet Haumea. Discovered by Michael E. Brown and the Keck Observatory adaptive optics team in the fall of 2005, it is named after Nāmaka, a water spirit and one of the daughters of Haumea in Hawaiian mythology. Namaka follows a highly elliptical orbit that is highly tilted by roughly 13 degrees with respect to Haumea's equator. Namaka is heavily perturbed by both the gravitational influence of Haumea's larger, outer moon Hiʻiaka and the variable gravitational field of Haumea's elongated shape.

With a diameter of around 150 km (93 mi), Namaka is predicted to have an irregular shape and a chaotic rotation. It has a reflective surface made of fresh water ice, similar to that of Haumea and Hiʻiaka. Like Hiʻiaka, Namaka is believed to be a fragment of Haumea that was ejected in the aftermath of a giant impact 4.4 billion years ago.

== Discovery and name ==
Namaka was discovered in the fall of 2005 by Michael E. Brown and the W. M. Keck Observatory adaptive optics team at Mauna Kea, Hawaii. It was noticed in high-resolution images of Haumea taken by the Keck II telescope on 1 March, 28 May, and 30 June 2005. Namaka was not recognized earlier because it was much fainter and closer to Haumea than its brighter sibling moon Hiʻiaka, which was discovered by Brown and his team back in January 2005. The discovery of Namaka was announced by the Central Bureau of Astronomical Telegrams on 1 December 2005.

When Namaka was announced, it given the temporary provisional designation S/2005 (2003 EL_{61}) 2, which indicates it is the second moon of Haumea (then known as 2003 EL_{61}) discovered in 2005. Brown nicknamed the moon "Blitzen," after one of Santa Claus's reindeer, as a continuation of the Christmas-themed nicknames he had been giving to the Haumea system at the time. (Note: The Christmas theme of nicknames began with Brown's discovery of Haumea (nicknamed "Santa" after Santa Claus) a few days after Christmas. Haumea's moons Hiʻiaka and Namaka were nicknamed "Rudolph" and "Blitzen," respectively, after Santa Claus's reindeer.)

Haumea, Hiʻiaka, and Namaka were all officially named after Hawaiian deities by the International Astronomical Union (IAU) on 17 September 2008. In Hawaiian mythology, Nāmaka is a water spirit born from the body of the fertility goddess Haumea. These names were proposed to the IAU by Brown's team in September 2006, who wanted to pay tribute to the location where they discovered the moons of Haumea.

== Orbit ==
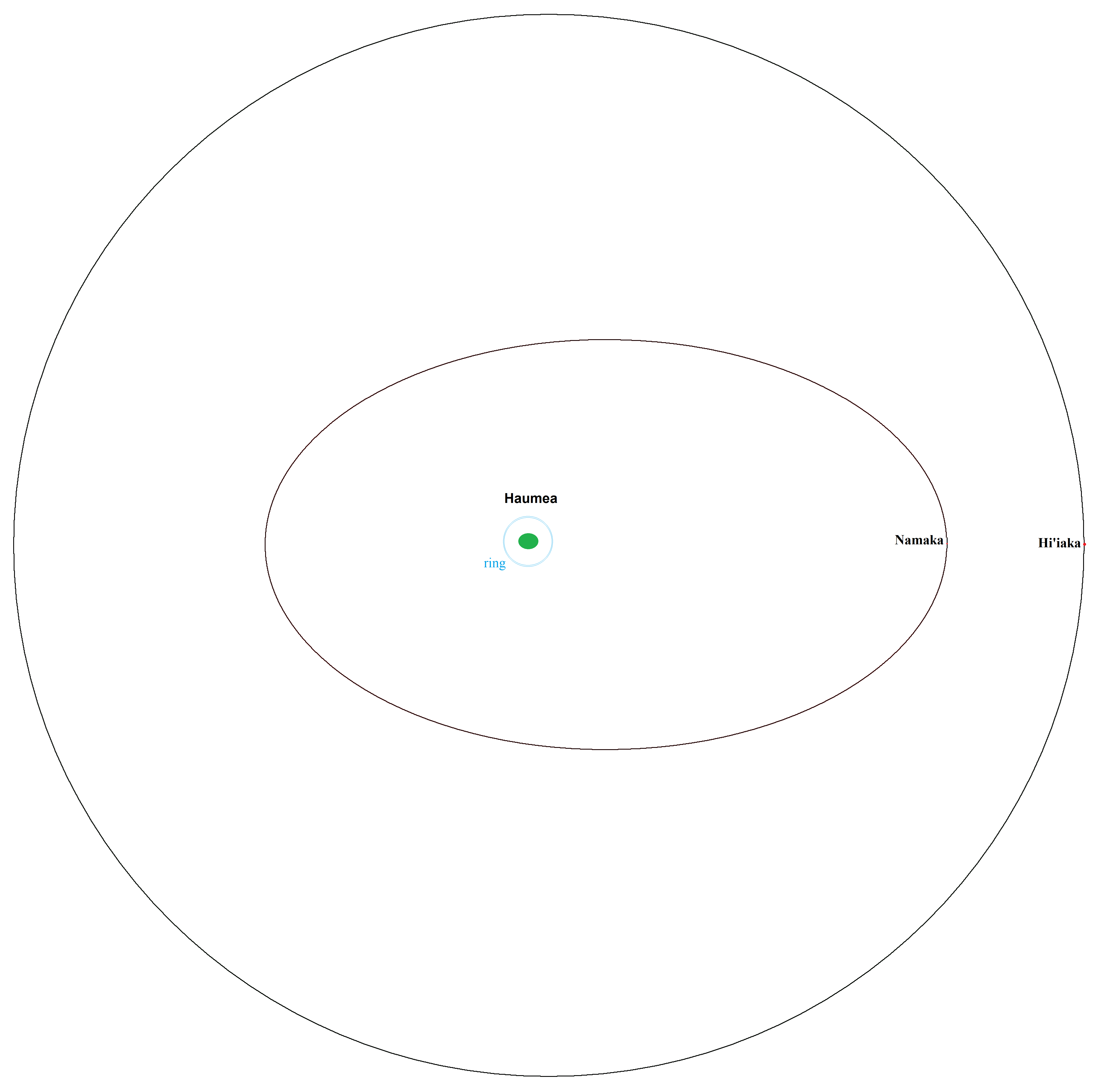
Diagram showing the orbits of Haumea's two moons, ring, and Haumea's ellipsoid shape, all to scale. The orbits are viewed above the rotational north pole of Haumea.

Namaka is the inner moon of Haumea, orbiting the dwarf planet in roughly 18.3 days at an average distance of 25,500 km (15,800 mi). Namaka follows a highly tilted elliptical orbit with an eccentricity of about 0.22 and an inclination of roughly 13° with respect to both Haumea's equator and Hiʻiaka's orbital plane. Namaka is heavily perturbed by both the gravitational influence of Hiʻiaka and the variable gravitational field of Haumea's elongated shape, which results in a time-varying eccentricity and inclination as well as nodal and apsidal precession of Namaka's orbit.

The ratio of Namaka's and Hiʻiaka's orbital periods is 2.689±0.004, which means Namaka and Hiʻiaka may be in (or is close to) a 8:3 mean-motion orbital resonance with each other, where Hiʻiaka completes 3 orbits for every 8 orbits completed by Namaka. Although it is uncertain whether Namaka and Hiʻiaka are still in a 8:3 orbital resonance today, simulations have shown that this resonance has likely played a major role in producing the moons' present-day orbits by allowing Hiʻiaka to transfer its initial orbital eccentricity and inclination to Namaka over the past few hundred million years. It is uncertain how long ago this resonance began and how long it had lasted.

=== Effects on Haumea and its ring ===
Like Hiʻiaka, Namaka's gravity induces a slight torque on Haumea that causes the dwarf planet's rotation axis to slowly precess by less than 1 degree. The period of Haumea's axial precession due to Namaka is equivalent to the nodal precession period of Namaka's orbit, which is several decades. Namaka's gravitational influence on Haumea's ring is small because the moon has a low mass and orbits far from Haumea's ring. Although Namaka's inclined orbit may affect the inclination of Haumea's ring and could potentially disperse the ring particles, these effects are undone by the much stronger gravitational perturbations by Haumea's flattened shape.

== Observation ==
Hubble Space Telescope timelapse of Hiʻiaka (brighter) and Namaka (fainter) orbiting Haumea (center, stationary) in 2008

When viewed from Earth, Namaka is about 67 times fainter than Haumea (1.5% of Haumea's brightness (Note: 1 divided by 1.5% (0.015; given by Müller et al. 2019) is approximately 67.)) and 3.7 times fainter than Hiʻiaka (~27% of Hiʻiaka's brightness (Note: 1 divided by 3.7 is approximately 0.27, or 27%.)). Because Namaka orbits close to Haumea, its angular separation from Haumea is less than 1 arcsecond, so it cannot be resolved separately without the use of high-resolution telescopes like the Hubble Space Telescope.

Namaka was predicted to eclipse and occult Haumea in 2009–2011, but observations did not detect any during that time. Later recalculations showed that the predicted time frame of Namaka's eclipses and occultations of Haumea were generally accurate, but are somewhat offset in time compared to previous predictions. Occasionally Namaka may pass in front of a background star and block out its light from Earth, resulting in a stellar occultation. Only one stellar occultation by Namaka has been observed on 16 March 2025.

== Physical characteristics ==
=== Size, mass, and density ===
Although the diameter of Namaka is poorly constrained, it is most likely between 100 and 200 km (62 and 124 mi), according to visible light and thermal infrared observations with inferred values for its albedo and density. Assuming an average diameter of 150 km (93 mi), Namaka would be about half the diameter of Hiʻiaka. More accurate and precise measurements of Namaka's diameter can be made if it is observed occulting a background star.

Namaka has a mass of about 1×10^{18} kg, which is roughly ten times less massive than Hiʻiaka (~10% of Hiʻiaka's mass) and roughly 3,000 times less massive than Haumea (~0.03% of Haumea's mass). The mass of Namaka was determined by observing deviations in the orbits of Namaka and Hiʻiaka due to their gravitational influence on each other. If Namaka has a diameter of 150 km (93 mi), its mass would indicate a low bulk density of 0.650 g/cm^{3}, which could suggest that Namaka has a highly porous interior similar to other small trans-Neptunian objects.

=== Surface ===
Like Haumea and Hiʻiaka, Namaka's surface is mostly made of fresh water ice. While the geometric albedo or reflectivity of Namaka's surface has not been measured, it is most likely between 50% and 80%.

=== Rotation and shape ===
Namaka is expected to have an irregular shape because of its small size. Observations by the Hubble Space Telescope in 2008 suggest that Namaka has an elongated shape because its brightness fluctuates by 0.3 magnitudes. However, Hubble observations from 2009 and 2010 did not detect any significant periodic fluctuation in Namaka's brightness, which could suggest that Namaka either has a highly tilted rotation axis, or a slow rotation with a period greater than 1 day.

Because Namaka orbits close to Haumea, the dwarf planet's tidal forces are expected to have slowed down Namaka's rotation. However, if Namaka rotates slowly, then Namaka would have a chaotic rotation because its eccentric orbit causes it to experience multiple spin-orbit resonances induced by Haumea's tides. Simulations predict that Namaka's axial tilt and rotation period can vary unpredictably over timescales of years, much like Saturn's chaotically rotating moon Hyperion. Confirming Namaka's slow and chaotic rotation will be difficult as it requires a long time span of high-resolution observations.

== Origin ==
A chart showing confirmed Haumea family members to scale (as of 2025). Unmeasured members are shown with estimated diameters using an assumed albedo of 0.7.

Namaka and Hiʻiaka are widely believed to be fragments of Haumea that were ejected in the aftermath of a giant impact 4.4 billion years ago (77–82 million years after the formation of the Solar System), when Neptune was migrating outward and gravitationally scattering objects in the Kuiper belt. This impact event is hypothesized to involve two large Kuiper belt objects of similar size, which obliquely collided with each other and merged into a single, rapidly rotating body that eventually deformed into an ellipsoidal body, becoming Haumea today. While this hypothesis explains Haumea's rapid rotation and high bulk density, it fails to explain the existence of Haumea's moons and family of icy KBOs on similar orbits, because such an energetic impact would have ejected fragments at speeds several times Haumea's escape velocity.

Rather than having formed directly from a giant impact, Haumea's family and moons are instead believed to have been ejected via rotational fissioning of Haumea roughly 80 million years after the impact (147–162 million years after Solar System's formation). A 2022 study led by Jessica Noviello and collaborators proposed that Haumea continued differentiating and growing its rocky core after the giant impact, which led to a gradual speed-up of Haumea's rotation rate as a consequence of angular momentum conservation. Centrifugal forces on Haumea's equator eventually grew so great that icy surface material began ejecting into orbit around Haumea, forming a disk of material that eventually coalesced into moons. About 3% of Haumea's initial mass and 14% of its initial angular momentum were lost via rotational fissioning.

The accretion of material around Haumea was likely gentle, as hinted by Namaka's present-day low density. Some of the moons that formed from this disk gravitationally scattered each other and escaped the Haumea system to become Haumea family KBOs, while the remaining material in orbit around Haumea became Namaka, Hiʻiaka, and Haumea's ring. Namaka and Hiʻiaka likely formed with initially coplanar and circular orbits near their present-day locations from Haumea. Subsequent orbital evolution by tidal interactions with Haumea and perturbations by closely-passing trans-Neptunian objects eventually led to Namaka and Hiʻiaka entering a 8:3 mean-motion orbital resonance, which led to their present-day orbits.

== See also ==
- Hiʻiaka – the larger moon of Haumea
- Haumea family – a population of water-ice rich Kuiper belt objects that were ejected from Haumea 4.4 billion years ago
