= Remus (moon) =

Smaller moon of 87 Sylvia

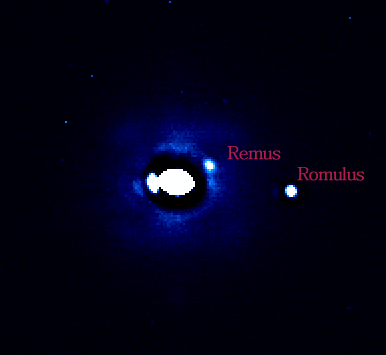
- Adaptive Optics observations of (87) Sylvia, showing its two satellites, Remus and Romulus.

Discovery
- Discovered by: Franck Marchis, Pascal Descamps, Daniel Hestroffer, Jérôme Berthier
- Discovery date: August 9, 2004

Designations
- Pronunciation: /ˈriːməs/
- Named after: Rēmus
- Alternative designations: (87) Sylvia II; S/2004 (87) 1
- Minor planet category: Main belt (Cybele)
- Adjectives: Remian /ˈriːmiən/

Orbital characteristics
- Semi-major axis: 706 ± 5 km
- Eccentricity: 0.016 ± 0.011
- Orbital period (sidereal): 1.3788 ± 0.0007 d
- Average orbital speed: 37.2 m/s
- Inclination: 2.0 ± 1.0° (with respect to Sylvia equator)
- Satellite of: 87 Sylvia

Physical characteristics
- Dimensions: 7 ± 2 km (Note: Assuming the same albedo as Sylvia)
- Mass: ~ 2×10^{14} kg (estimate) (Note: Assuming same density and albedo as Sylvia)
- Equatorial escape velocity: ~ 4 m/s (estimate)
- Synodic rotation period: unknown, probably synchronous (Note: Based on a rough tidal locking timescale of several tens of My.)
- Axial tilt: unknown, zero expected
- Absolute magnitude (H): 11.1

Remus, formal designation 87 Sylvia II, is the inner and smaller moon of the main-belt asteroid 87 Sylvia. It follows an almost-circular and close-to-equatorial orbit around the parent asteroid. In this respect it is similar to the other Sylvian moon Romulus.

== Discovery and naming ==
Remus was discovered in 2005, several years after Romulus, on images taken starting on August 9, 2004, and was announced on August 10. It was discovered by Franck Marchis of UC Berkeley, and Pascal Descamps, Daniel Hestroffer, and Jérôme Berthier of the Observatoire de Paris, France, using the Yepun telescope of the European Southern Observatory (ESO) in Chile. Marchis, the project leader, was waiting for the completion of the image acquisition programme before starting to process the data. Just as he was set to go on vacation in March 2005, Descamps sent him a brief note entitled "87 Sylvia est triple?" pointing out that he could see two moonlets on several images of Sylvia. The entire team then focused quickly on analysis of the data, wrote a paper, submitted an abstract to the August meeting in Rio de Janeiro and submitted a naming proposal to the IAU.

Its formal designation is (87) Sylvia II; before receiving its name, it was known as S/2004 (87) 1. The moon is named after Remus, twin of the mythological founder of Rome, one of the children of Rhea Silvia raised by a wolf.

== Characteristics ==
87 Sylvia has a low density, which indicates that it is probably a rubble pile asteroid formed when debris from a collision between its parent body and another asteroid re-accreted gravitationally. Thus it is likely that both Remus and Romulus are smaller rubble piles which accreted in orbit around the main body from debris of the same collision. In this case their albedo and density are expected to be similar to Sylvia's.

Remus's orbit is expected to be quite stable: it lies far inside Sylvia's Hill sphere (about 1/100 of Sylvia's Hill radius), but also far outside the synchronous orbit.

From Remus's surface, Sylvia appears huge, taking up an angular region roughly 30°×18° across, while Romulus's apparent size varies between 1.6° and 0.5° across.

== See also ==
- Romulus (moon)
