= Romulus (moon) =

Larger moon of 87 Sylvia

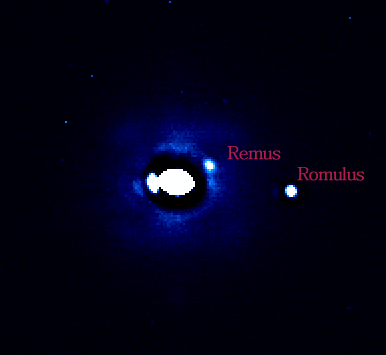
- Adaptive Optics observations of (87) Sylvia, showing its two satellites, Remus and Romulus.

Discovery
- Discovered by: Michael E. Brown; Jean-Luc Margot
- Discovery date: 18 February 2001

Designations
- MPC designation: Sylvia I
- Pronunciation: /ˈrɒmjʊləs/
- Named after: Rōmulus
- Alternative designations: (87) Sylvia I; S/2001 (87) 1
- Minor planet category: Main belt (Cybele)
- Adjectives: Romulian, -ean (both /rɒˈmjuːliən/)

Orbital characteristics
- Epoch 1 September 2004 (JD 1795812.5)
- Semi-major axis: 1351.35±0.1 km
- Eccentricity: 0.0069±0.0037
- Orbital period (sidereal): 3.6496+0.025 −0.024 d
- Average orbital speed: 27.0 m/s
- Mean anomaly: 167°±23°
- Inclination: 1.7°±1.0° (with respect to Sylvia equator)
- Longitude of ascending node: 93.17°±1.85°
- Argument of perihelion: 175°±23°
- Satellite of: 87 Sylvia

Physical characteristics
- Dimensions: (38.0±3.2) × (14.0±0.8) km (best-fit)
- Mean diameter: 23.1±0.7 km
- Mass: 9.319+20.7 −8.3×10^{14} kg
- Equatorial escape velocity: ~ 4.8 m/s (estimate)
- Absolute magnitude (H): 10.7

Romulus, formal designation 87 Sylvia I, is the outer and larger moon of the main-belt asteroid 87 Sylvia. It follows an almost-circular and close-to-equatorial orbit around the asteroid. In this respect it is similar to the other Sylvian moon Remus.

== Discovery and naming ==
Romulus was discovered in February 2001 from the Keck II telescope by Michael E. Brown and Jean-Luc Margot. Its formal designation is (87) Sylvia I; before receiving its name, it was known as S/2001 (87) 1. The moon is named after Romulus, the mythological founder of Rome, one of the twins of Rhea Silvia raised by a wolf.

== Characteristics ==
87 Sylvia has a low density, which indicates that it is probably a rubble pile formed when debris from a collision between its parent body and another asteroid re-accreted gravitationally. Therefore, it is likely that both Romulus and Remus, the second of Sylvia's moons, are smaller rubble piles which accreted in orbit around the main body from debris of the same collision. In this case their albedo and density are expected to be similar to Sylvia's.

Romulus's orbit is expected to be quite stable − it lies far inside Sylvia's Hill sphere (about 1/50 of Sylvia's Hill radius), but also far outside the synchronous orbit.

From Romulus's surface, Sylvia takes up an angular region 16°×10° across, while Remus's apparent size varies between 0.62° and 0.19° (for comparison, Earth's Moon has an apparent size of about 0.5°).

== See also ==
- Remus (moon)
