= Jean-Luc Margot =

Belgian-born astronomer and professor

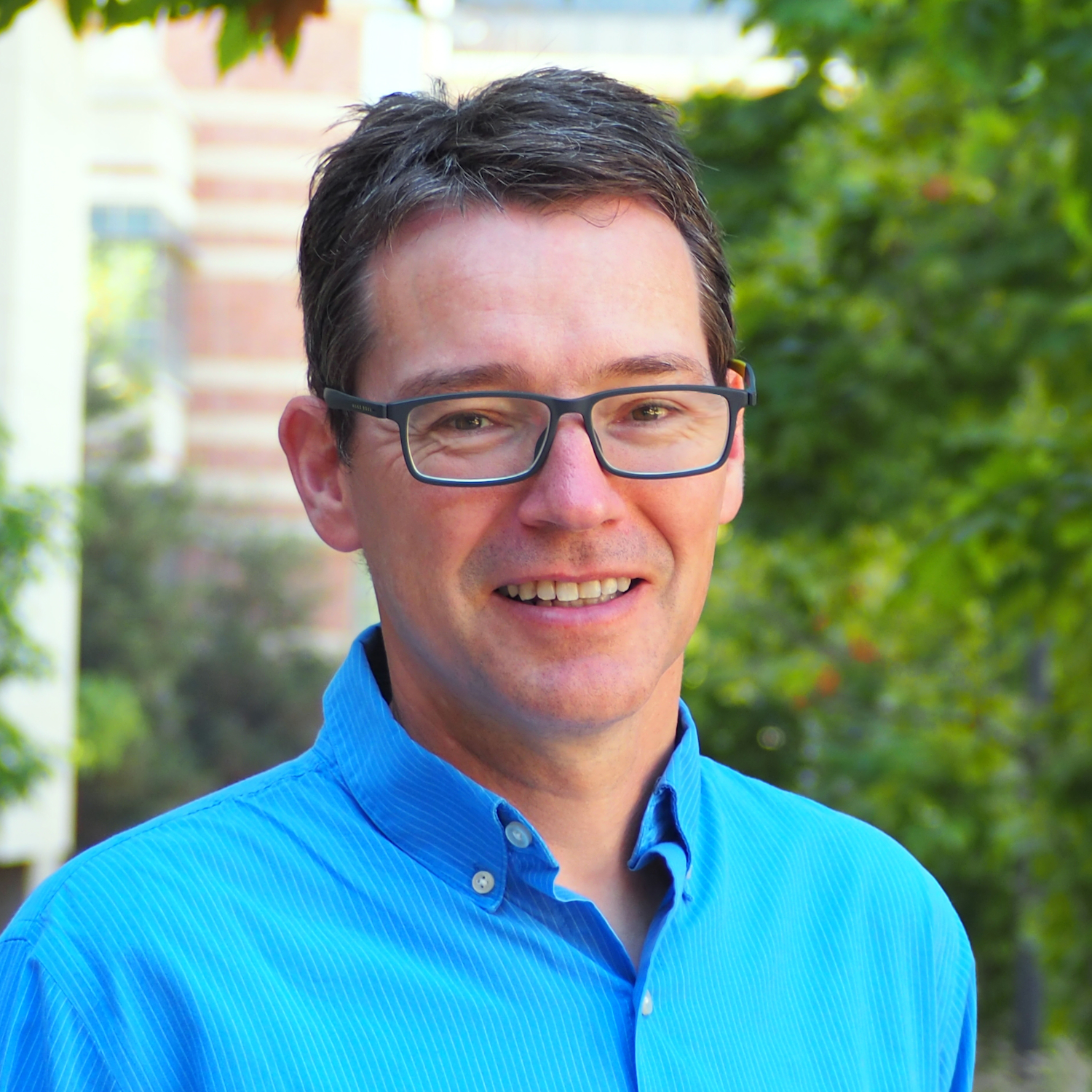
- Born: 1969 (age 56–57); Leuven, Belgium
- Education: Cornell University (PhD 1999); Universite Catholique de Louvain (B.S. 1993)
- Awards: H. C. Urey Prize (2004); Order of the Crown (Belgium) (2018)
- Scientific career
- Fields: planetary physics, astrophysics
- Workplaces: UCLA
- Doctoral advisor: Donald B. Campbell

Jean-Luc Margot (French: [ʒɑ̃ lyk maʁɡo]; born 1969) is a Belgian-born astronomer and a UCLA professor with expertise in planetary sciences and SETI.

== Career ==
Margot has discovered and studied several binary asteroids with radar and optical telescopes. His discoveries include (87) Sylvia I Romulus, (22) Kalliope I Linus, S/2003 (379) 1, (702) Alauda I Pichi üñëm, and the binary nature of (69230) Hermes.

In 2000, he obtained the first images of binary near-Earth asteroids and described formation of the binary by a spin-up process. Margot and his research group have studied the influence of sunlight on the orbits and spins of asteroids, the Yarkovsky and YORP effects.

In 2007, Margot and collaborators determined that Mercury has a molten core from the analysis of small variations in the rotation rate of the planet. These observations also enabled a measurement of the size of the core based on a concept proposed by Stan Peale.

In 2012, Margot and graduate student Julia Fang analyzed Kepler space telescope data to infer the architecture of planetary systems. They described planetary systems as "flatter than pancakes." They also showed that many planetary systems are dynamically packed.

Margot proposed an extension to the IAU definition of planet that applies to exoplanets.

Between 2006 and 2021, Margot and collaborators measured the spin of Venus with a radar speckle tracking technique. They measured the orientation and precession of the spin axis. They also measured the duration of the length of day and the amplitude of length-of-day variations, which they attribute to transfer of momentum between the atmosphere and the solid planet.

Since 2016, he has conducted searches for technosignatures using large radio telescopes with UCLA students. Volunteers can contribute to SETI through the "Are we alone in the universe?" citizen science collaboration.

== Honors and awards ==
Margot was awarded the H. C. Urey Prize by the American Astronomical Society in 2004. The asteroid 9531 Jean-Luc is named after him.
