= List of minor planets: 781001–782000 =

The following is a partial list of minor planets, running from minor-planet number 781001 through 782000, inclusive. The primary data for this and other partial lists is based on JPL's "Small-Body Orbital Elements" and data available from the Minor Planet Center. Critical list information is also provided by the MPC, unless otherwise specified from Lowell Observatory. A detailed description of the table's columns and additional sources are given on the main page including a complete list of every page in this series, and a statistical break-up on the dynamical classification of minor planets.

Also see the summary list of all named bodies in numerical and alphabetical order, and the corresponding naming citations for the number range of this particular list. New namings may only be added to this list after official publication, as the preannouncement of names is condemned by the Working Group for Small Bodies Nomenclature of the International Astronomical Union.

Near-Earth obj.	MBA (inner)	MBA (outer)	Centaur
Mars-crosser	MBA (middle)	Jupiter trojan	Trans-Neptunian obj.
Unclassified

== 781001–781100 ==
Designation			Discovery			Properties		Ref
Permanent	Provisional	Named after	Date	Site	Discoverer(s)	Category	Diam.	Ref
781001	2013 BB_{28}	—	November 2, 2007	Kitt Peak	Spacewatch	·	1.7 km	MPC · JPL
781002	2013 BP_{28}	—	January 16, 2013	Mount Lemmon	A. Kostin, T. Vorobjov	·	2.4 km	MPC · JPL
781003	2013 BC_{31}	—	January 16, 2013	Haleakala	Pan-STARRS 1	·	990 m	MPC · JPL
781004	2013 BL_{38}	—	January 10, 2013	Haleakala	Pan-STARRS 1	L4	5.8 km	MPC · JPL
781005	2013 BK_{39}	—	January 9, 2013	Kitt Peak	Spacewatch	·	1.9 km	MPC · JPL
781006	2013 BF_{40}	—	January 10, 2013	Haleakala	Pan-STARRS 1	·	1.4 km	MPC · JPL
781007	2013 BO_{41}	—	January 18, 2013	Mount Lemmon	Mount Lemmon Survey	L4	5.6 km	MPC · JPL
781008	2013 BG_{47}	—	January 16, 2013	Haleakala	Pan-STARRS 1	·	2.0 km	MPC · JPL
781009	2013 BN_{47}	—	December 23, 2012	Haleakala	Pan-STARRS 1	EOS	1.3 km	MPC · JPL
781010	2013 BZ_{49}	—	January 16, 2013	Haleakala	Pan-STARRS 1	L4	6.3 km	MPC · JPL
781011	2013 BR_{50}	—	January 7, 2013	Kitt Peak	Spacewatch	·	980 m	MPC · JPL
781012	2013 BH_{51}	—	February 8, 2002	Kitt Peak	Deep Ecliptic Survey	L4	5.8 km	MPC · JPL
781013	2013 BC_{56}	—	January 17, 2013	Haleakala	Pan-STARRS 1	·	820 m	MPC · JPL
781014	2013 BJ_{67}	—	January 20, 2013	Kitt Peak	Spacewatch	·	2.1 km	MPC · JPL
781015	2013 BK_{68}	—	January 19, 2009	Mount Lemmon	Mount Lemmon Survey	·	730 m	MPC · JPL
781016	2013 BP_{69}	—	October 19, 2011	Mount Lemmon	Mount Lemmon Survey	·	1.3 km	MPC · JPL
781017	2013 BX_{72}	—	January 10, 2013	Haleakala	Pan-STARRS 1	·	980 m	MPC · JPL
781018	2013 BT_{76}	—	April 11, 2008	Kitt Peak	Spacewatch	·	2.0 km	MPC · JPL
781019	2013 BS_{77}	—	January 31, 2013	Mount Lemmon	Mount Lemmon Survey	·	1.5 km	MPC · JPL
781020	2013 BE_{83}	—	September 4, 2011	Haleakala	Pan-STARRS 1	·	1.1 km	MPC · JPL
781021	2013 BK_{83}	—	January 17, 2013	Kitt Peak	Spacewatch	·	1.1 km	MPC · JPL
781022	2013 BL_{83}	—	January 18, 2013	Mount Lemmon	Mount Lemmon Survey	KON	1.7 km	MPC · JPL
781023	2013 BB_{86}	—	January 20, 2013	Mount Lemmon	Mount Lemmon Survey	·	2.4 km	MPC · JPL
781024	2013 BE_{86}	—	January 19, 2013	Mount Lemmon	Mount Lemmon Survey	·	2.6 km	MPC · JPL
781025	2013 BA_{89}	—	November 13, 2017	Haleakala	Pan-STARRS 1	·	2.2 km	MPC · JPL
781026	2013 BH_{89}	—	January 18, 2013	Mount Lemmon	Mount Lemmon Survey	·	3.0 km	MPC · JPL
781027	2013 BC_{90}	—	January 20, 2013	Mount Lemmon	Mount Lemmon Survey	(5)	770 m	MPC · JPL
781028	2013 BG_{90}	—	January 18, 2013	Haleakala	Pan-STARRS 1	·	2.5 km	MPC · JPL
781029	2013 BL_{90}	—	January 17, 2013	Haleakala	Pan-STARRS 1	L4	6.4 km	MPC · JPL
781030	2013 BV_{90}	—	March 24, 2014	Haleakala	Pan-STARRS 1	·	2.2 km	MPC · JPL
781031	2013 BY_{91}	—	February 13, 2002	Kitt Peak	Spacewatch	L4	5.3 km	MPC · JPL
781032	2013 BA_{92}	—	January 22, 2013	Mount Lemmon	Mount Lemmon Survey	·	1.4 km	MPC · JPL
781033	2013 BK_{92}	—	January 17, 2013	Haleakala	Pan-STARRS 1	·	1.2 km	MPC · JPL
781034	2013 BB_{95}	—	January 19, 2013	Mount Lemmon	Mount Lemmon Survey	EUN	660 m	MPC · JPL
781035	2013 BB_{96}	—	January 17, 2013	Haleakala	Pan-STARRS 1	EOS	1.6 km	MPC · JPL
781036	2013 BK_{96}	—	January 16, 2013	Haleakala	Pan-STARRS 1	·	2.1 km	MPC · JPL
781037	2013 BA_{97}	—	January 20, 2013	Mount Lemmon	Mount Lemmon Survey	·	2.5 km	MPC · JPL
781038	2013 BN_{98}	—	January 18, 2013	Mount Lemmon	Mount Lemmon Survey	L4	5.5 km	MPC · JPL
781039	2013 BZ_{98}	—	January 19, 2013	Kitt Peak	Spacewatch	·	970 m	MPC · JPL
781040	2013 BC_{99}	—	January 18, 2013	Mount Lemmon	Mount Lemmon Survey	L4	5.5 km	MPC · JPL
781041	2013 BF_{100}	—	January 18, 2013	Haleakala	Pan-STARRS 1	·	2.0 km	MPC · JPL
781042	2013 BG_{100}	—	January 17, 2013	Haleakala	Pan-STARRS 1	·	1.9 km	MPC · JPL
781043	2013 BY_{101}	—	January 16, 2013	Mount Lemmon	Mount Lemmon Survey	L4 · ERY	5.2 km	MPC · JPL
781044	2013 BH_{102}	—	January 17, 2013	Haleakala	Pan-STARRS 1	L4	5.7 km	MPC · JPL
781045	2013 BK_{102}	—	January 19, 2013	Mount Lemmon	Mount Lemmon Survey	L4	6.1 km	MPC · JPL
781046	2013 BM_{102}	—	January 16, 2013	Haleakala	Pan-STARRS 1	L4	5.8 km	MPC · JPL
781047	2013 BP_{102}	—	January 17, 2013	Haleakala	Pan-STARRS 1	L4	5.5 km	MPC · JPL
781048	2013 BR_{102}	—	January 17, 2013	Haleakala	Pan-STARRS 1	L4	5.5 km	MPC · JPL
781049	2013 BG_{103}	—	January 22, 2013	Mount Lemmon	Mount Lemmon Survey	·	2.3 km	MPC · JPL
781050	2013 BK_{103}	—	January 19, 2013	Kitt Peak	Spacewatch	·	1.2 km	MPC · JPL
781051	2013 BL_{103}	—	January 20, 2013	Kitt Peak	Spacewatch	·	1.4 km	MPC · JPL
781052	2013 BN_{103}	—	January 17, 2013	Haleakala	Pan-STARRS 1	HNS	790 m	MPC · JPL
781053	2013 BJ_{104}	—	January 18, 2013	Mount Lemmon	Mount Lemmon Survey	·	1.9 km	MPC · JPL
781054	2013 BA_{105}	—	January 18, 2013	Haleakala	Pan-STARRS 1	·	2.2 km	MPC · JPL
781055	2013 BF_{105}	—	January 19, 2013	Mount Lemmon	Mount Lemmon Survey	L4	6.0 km	MPC · JPL
781056	2013 BS_{105}	—	January 17, 2013	Haleakala	Pan-STARRS 1	L4	6.3 km	MPC · JPL
781057	2013 BU_{105}	—	January 17, 2013	Haleakala	Pan-STARRS 1	·	680 m	MPC · JPL
781058	2013 BY_{105}	—	January 17, 2013	Haleakala	Pan-STARRS 1	·	1.8 km	MPC · JPL
781059	2013 BC_{106}	—	January 19, 2013	Mount Lemmon	Mount Lemmon Survey	·	1.9 km	MPC · JPL
781060	2013 BK_{107}	—	January 17, 2013	Haleakala	Pan-STARRS 1	L4	5.7 km	MPC · JPL
781061	2013 BU_{107}	—	January 19, 2013	Mount Lemmon	Mount Lemmon Survey	·	2.6 km	MPC · JPL
781062	2013 BX_{107}	—	January 18, 2013	Mount Lemmon	Mount Lemmon Survey	L4	5.3 km	MPC · JPL
781063	2013 BZ_{107}	—	January 17, 2013	Haleakala	Pan-STARRS 1	·	1.5 km	MPC · JPL
781064	2013 BL_{108}	—	January 16, 2013	Haleakala	Pan-STARRS 1	·	2.2 km	MPC · JPL
781065	2013 BE_{110}	—	January 18, 2013	Haleakala	Pan-STARRS 1	L4	6.0 km	MPC · JPL
781066	2013 BX_{110}	—	January 20, 2013	Mount Lemmon	Mount Lemmon Survey	·	980 m	MPC · JPL
781067	2013 CQ	—	February 1, 2013	Mount Lemmon	Mount Lemmon Survey	·	1.9 km	MPC · JPL
781068	2013 CU	—	January 10, 2013	Haleakala	Pan-STARRS 1	L4	6.3 km	MPC · JPL
781069	2013 CZ_{2}	—	September 4, 2011	Haleakala	Pan-STARRS 1	·	830 m	MPC · JPL
781070	2013 CM_{3}	—	January 20, 2009	Mount Lemmon	Mount Lemmon Survey	·	900 m	MPC · JPL
781071	2013 CS_{5}	—	February 2, 2013	Mount Lemmon	Mount Lemmon Survey	·	2.2 km	MPC · JPL
781072	2013 CM_{7}	—	February 2, 2013	Mount Lemmon	Mount Lemmon Survey	·	680 m	MPC · JPL
781073	2013 CO_{7}	—	February 2, 2013	Mount Lemmon	Mount Lemmon Survey	KON	1.8 km	MPC · JPL
781074	2013 CN_{22}	—	January 5, 2013	Mount Lemmon	Mount Lemmon Survey	(895)	2.3 km	MPC · JPL
781075	2013 CP_{27}	—	January 17, 2013	Haleakala	Pan-STARRS 1	(895)	2.4 km	MPC · JPL
781076	2013 CW_{30}	—	December 14, 2007	Mount Lemmon	Mount Lemmon Survey	·	1.4 km	MPC · JPL
781077	2013 CD_{35}	—	February 6, 2013	Kitt Peak	Spacewatch	·	1.3 km	MPC · JPL
781078	2013 CK_{42}	—	February 27, 2009	Kitt Peak	Spacewatch	EUN	630 m	MPC · JPL
781079	2013 CU_{45}	—	December 13, 2006	Mount Lemmon	Mount Lemmon Survey	·	2.6 km	MPC · JPL
781080	2013 CG_{51}	—	January 19, 2013	Kitt Peak	Spacewatch	BAR	910 m	MPC · JPL
781081	2013 CU_{58}	—	October 19, 2011	Mount Lemmon	Mount Lemmon Survey	AEO	930 m	MPC · JPL
781082	2013 CO_{59}	—	February 3, 2013	Haleakala	Pan-STARRS 1	TIR	2.1 km	MPC · JPL
781083	2013 CE_{68}	—	January 8, 2013	Mount Lemmon	Mount Lemmon Survey	·	1.4 km	MPC · JPL
781084	2013 CA_{69}	—	February 8, 2013	Haleakala	Pan-STARRS 1	·	2.0 km	MPC · JPL
781085	2013 CY_{69}	—	February 1, 2013	Kitt Peak	Spacewatch	L4	6.5 km	MPC · JPL
781086	2013 CM_{70}	—	January 19, 2013	Mount Lemmon	Mount Lemmon Survey	HNS	840 m	MPC · JPL
781087	2013 CU_{71}	—	January 9, 2013	Kitt Peak	Spacewatch	TIR	1.9 km	MPC · JPL
781088	2013 CV_{74}	—	February 5, 2013	Mount Lemmon	Mount Lemmon Survey	·	800 m	MPC · JPL
781089	2013 CW_{74}	—	February 5, 2013	Mount Lemmon	Mount Lemmon Survey	·	1.6 km	MPC · JPL
781090	2013 CW_{75}	—	February 6, 2013	Kitt Peak	Spacewatch	·	1.1 km	MPC · JPL
781091	2013 CS_{80}	—	July 5, 2005	Siding Spring	SSS	·	1.9 km	MPC · JPL
781092	2013 CW_{90}	—	February 8, 2013	Mount Lemmon	Mount Lemmon Survey	·	1.0 km	MPC · JPL
781093	2013 CC_{93}	—	February 8, 2013	Haleakala	Pan-STARRS 1	·	1.4 km	MPC · JPL
781094	2013 CD_{93}	—	February 8, 2013	Haleakala	Pan-STARRS 1	WIT	700 m	MPC · JPL
781095	2013 CR_{94}	—	February 3, 2009	Mount Lemmon	Mount Lemmon Survey	EUN	710 m	MPC · JPL
781096	2013 CQ_{95}	—	January 13, 2008	Kitt Peak	Spacewatch	·	1.3 km	MPC · JPL
781097	2013 CU_{96}	—	October 31, 2021	Haleakala	Pan-STARRS 1	L4	5.8 km	MPC · JPL
781098	2013 CW_{96}	—	February 8, 2013	Haleakala	Pan-STARRS 1	·	2.2 km	MPC · JPL
781099	2013 CH_{98}	—	January 25, 2009	Kitt Peak	Spacewatch	·	930 m	MPC · JPL
781100	2013 CT_{99}	—	February 8, 2013	Haleakala	Pan-STARRS 1	L4	5.2 km	MPC · JPL

== 781101–781200 ==
back to top

Designation			Discovery			Properties		Ref
Permanent	Provisional	Named after	Date	Site	Discoverer(s)	Category	Diam.	Ref
781101	2013 CV_{99}	—	January 18, 2012	Mount Lemmon	Mount Lemmon Survey	L4 · ERY	5.9 km	MPC · JPL
781102	2013 CD_{100}	—	February 8, 2013	Haleakala	Pan-STARRS 1	L4	6.0 km	MPC · JPL
781103	2013 CH_{101}	—	February 5, 2013	Kitt Peak	Spacewatch	·	2.3 km	MPC · JPL
781104	2013 CS_{102}	—	February 2, 2013	Kitt Peak	Spacewatch	EUN	880 m	MPC · JPL
781105	2013 CU_{102}	—	July 26, 2011	Haleakala	Pan-STARRS 1	·	810 m	MPC · JPL
781106	2013 CJ_{104}	—	February 9, 2013	Haleakala	Pan-STARRS 1	L4	5.7 km	MPC · JPL
781107	2013 CO_{104}	—	October 8, 2007	Kitt Peak	Spacewatch	·	810 m	MPC · JPL
781108	2013 CP_{111}	—	January 31, 2009	Kitt Peak	Spacewatch	·	1.3 km	MPC · JPL
781109	2013 CY_{118}	—	January 9, 2013	Mount Lemmon	Mount Lemmon Survey	THB	2.7 km	MPC · JPL
781110	2013 CZ_{121}	—	January 30, 2017	Mount Lemmon	Mount Lemmon Survey	MAR	630 m	MPC · JPL
781111	2013 CN_{123}	—	February 20, 2009	Kitt Peak	Spacewatch	MAR	810 m	MPC · JPL
781112	2013 CQ_{124}	—	April 15, 2008	Kitt Peak	Spacewatch	·	2.8 km	MPC · JPL
781113	2013 CZ_{126}	—	January 18, 2013	Kitt Peak	Spacewatch	·	760 m	MPC · JPL
781114	2013 CJ_{132}	—	February 14, 2013	Haleakala	Pan-STARRS 1	·	2.3 km	MPC · JPL
781115	2013 CA_{133}	—	February 9, 2013	Haleakala	Pan-STARRS 1	L4	6.2 km	MPC · JPL
781116	2013 CP_{133}	—	February 15, 2013	Oukaïmeden	C. Rinner	·	1.2 km	MPC · JPL
781117	2013 CZ_{141}	—	February 14, 2013	Kitt Peak	Spacewatch	L4	6.1 km	MPC · JPL
781118	2013 CP_{142}	—	January 10, 2013	Kitt Peak	Spacewatch	·	900 m	MPC · JPL
781119	2013 CH_{144}	—	February 14, 2013	Kitt Peak	Spacewatch	·	1.9 km	MPC · JPL
781120	2013 CU_{146}	—	February 5, 2013	Kitt Peak	Spacewatch	·	1.2 km	MPC · JPL
781121	2013 CY_{146}	—	February 22, 2009	Kitt Peak	Spacewatch	·	810 m	MPC · JPL
781122	2013 CX_{149}	—	September 24, 2011	Haleakala	Pan-STARRS 1	·	1.7 km	MPC · JPL
781123	2013 CH_{150}	—	February 14, 2013	Kitt Peak	Spacewatch	·	2.9 km	MPC · JPL
781124	2013 CL_{151}	—	February 26, 2009	Kitt Peak	Spacewatch	·	780 m	MPC · JPL
781125	2013 CH_{152}	—	February 14, 2013	Haleakala	Pan-STARRS 1	·	1.0 km	MPC · JPL
781126	2013 CU_{154}	—	February 14, 2013	Haleakala	Pan-STARRS 1	HNS	720 m	MPC · JPL
781127	2013 CD_{155}	—	February 14, 2013	Haleakala	Pan-STARRS 1	·	1.1 km	MPC · JPL
781128	2013 CD_{162}	—	March 21, 2004	Kitt Peak	Spacewatch	·	1.5 km	MPC · JPL
781129	2013 CG_{162}	—	February 14, 2013	Haleakala	Pan-STARRS 1	EUN	730 m	MPC · JPL
781130	2013 CC_{164}	—	February 14, 2013	Kitt Peak	Spacewatch	EOS	1.5 km	MPC · JPL
781131	2013 CU_{168}	—	February 14, 2013	Mount Lemmon	Mount Lemmon Survey	·	1.2 km	MPC · JPL
781132	2013 CL_{177}	—	January 8, 2013	Kitt Peak	Spacewatch	·	850 m	MPC · JPL
781133	2013 CL_{178}	—	October 23, 2011	Mount Lemmon	Mount Lemmon Survey	·	1.2 km	MPC · JPL
781134	2013 CY_{185}	—	March 3, 2005	Kitt Peak	Spacewatch	EUN	880 m	MPC · JPL
781135	2013 CD_{190}	—	February 16, 2005	La Silla	A. Boattini, H. Scholl	·	820 m	MPC · JPL
781136	2013 CM_{194}	—	January 20, 2013	Kitt Peak	Spacewatch	·	2.0 km	MPC · JPL
781137	2013 CE_{200}	—	April 7, 2008	Mount Lemmon	Mount Lemmon Survey	·	2.0 km	MPC · JPL
781138	2013 CA_{201}	—	February 9, 2013	Haleakala	Pan-STARRS 1	·	2.1 km	MPC · JPL
781139	2013 CL_{204}	—	February 5, 2013	Kitt Peak	Spacewatch	NEM	1.7 km	MPC · JPL
781140	2013 CW_{207}	—	February 14, 2013	Nogales	M. Schwartz, P. R. Holvorcem	·	1.9 km	MPC · JPL
781141	2013 CQ_{209}	—	January 16, 2013	ESA OGS	ESA OGS	DOR	1.9 km	MPC · JPL
781142	2013 CZ_{210}	—	January 1, 2012	Mount Lemmon	Mount Lemmon Survey	L4	6.1 km	MPC · JPL
781143	2013 CA_{219}	—	February 9, 2013	Haleakala	Pan-STARRS 1	L4	5.9 km	MPC · JPL
781144	2013 CO_{219}	—	February 9, 2013	Haleakala	Pan-STARRS 1	·	750 m	MPC · JPL
781145	2013 CW_{219}	—	February 9, 2013	Haleakala	Pan-STARRS 1	KOR	920 m	MPC · JPL
781146	2013 CR_{221}	—	January 20, 2013	Mount Lemmon	Mount Lemmon Survey	L4	6.5 km	MPC · JPL
781147	2013 CX_{224}	—	February 15, 2013	Haleakala	Pan-STARRS 1	(5)	750 m	MPC · JPL
781148	2013 CQ_{226}	—	February 8, 2013	Haleakala	Pan-STARRS 1	·	1.3 km	MPC · JPL
781149	2013 CH_{227}	—	February 14, 2013	Kitt Peak	Spacewatch	EUN	810 m	MPC · JPL
781150	2013 CU_{227}	—	February 15, 2013	Haleakala	Pan-STARRS 1	·	710 m	MPC · JPL
781151	2013 CA_{228}	—	October 20, 2011	Mount Lemmon	Mount Lemmon Survey	AGN	830 m	MPC · JPL
781152	2013 CN_{228}	—	February 15, 2013	Haleakala	Pan-STARRS 1	·	1.5 km	MPC · JPL
781153	2013 CD_{231}	—	February 14, 2013	Mount Lemmon	Mount Lemmon Survey	·	2.6 km	MPC · JPL
781154	2013 CK_{231}	—	February 15, 2013	Haleakala	Pan-STARRS 1	EUN	800 m	MPC · JPL
781155	2013 CZ_{232}	—	September 22, 2003	Kitt Peak	Spacewatch	·	690 m	MPC · JPL
781156	2013 CJ_{234}	—	July 7, 2016	Haleakala	Pan-STARRS 1	LUT	3.0 km	MPC · JPL
781157	2013 CD_{235}	—	February 8, 2013	Haleakala	Pan-STARRS 1	·	1.8 km	MPC · JPL
781158	2013 CG_{236}	—	September 30, 2017	Haleakala	Pan-STARRS 1	·	2.4 km	MPC · JPL
781159	2013 CA_{237}	—	September 9, 2015	Haleakala	Pan-STARRS 1	·	840 m	MPC · JPL
781160	2013 CQ_{237}	—	June 23, 2014	Mount Lemmon	Mount Lemmon Survey	·	1.1 km	MPC · JPL
781161	2013 CE_{241}	—	February 9, 2013	Haleakala	Pan-STARRS 1	·	1.1 km	MPC · JPL
781162	2013 CJ_{241}	—	February 9, 2013	Haleakala	Pan-STARRS 1	·	2.0 km	MPC · JPL
781163	2013 CW_{242}	—	February 15, 2013	Haleakala	Pan-STARRS 1	GEF	770 m	MPC · JPL
781164	2013 CJ_{243}	—	February 9, 2013	Haleakala	Pan-STARRS 1	·	950 m	MPC · JPL
781165	2013 CZ_{243}	—	February 1, 2013	Mount Lemmon	Mount Lemmon Survey	·	1.1 km	MPC · JPL
781166	2013 CT_{244}	—	February 15, 2013	Haleakala	Pan-STARRS 1	·	830 m	MPC · JPL
781167	2013 CN_{245}	—	February 15, 2013	Haleakala	Pan-STARRS 1	·	1.4 km	MPC · JPL
781168	2013 CY_{247}	—	February 9, 2013	Haleakala	Pan-STARRS 1	(5)	940 m	MPC · JPL
781169	2013 CD_{248}	—	February 10, 2013	Haleakala	Pan-STARRS 1	·	1.3 km	MPC · JPL
781170	2013 CE_{249}	—	February 8, 2013	Haleakala	Pan-STARRS 1	·	1.3 km	MPC · JPL
781171	2013 CR_{250}	—	February 8, 2013	Haleakala	Pan-STARRS 1	·	680 m	MPC · JPL
781172	2013 CS_{250}	—	February 15, 2013	Haleakala	Pan-STARRS 1	AGN	850 m	MPC · JPL
781173	2013 CW_{250}	—	February 15, 2013	Haleakala	Pan-STARRS 1	L4	6.0 km	MPC · JPL
781174	2013 CZ_{251}	—	February 1, 2013	Kitt Peak	Spacewatch	(5)	620 m	MPC · JPL
781175	2013 CV_{252}	—	February 14, 2013	Haleakala	Pan-STARRS 1	·	2.4 km	MPC · JPL
781176	2013 CR_{253}	—	February 9, 2013	Haleakala	Pan-STARRS 1	EOS	1.3 km	MPC · JPL
781177	2013 CA_{255}	—	February 15, 2013	Haleakala	Pan-STARRS 1	L4 · ERY	5.8 km	MPC · JPL
781178	2013 CB_{255}	—	February 15, 2013	Haleakala	Pan-STARRS 1	L4 · ERY	5.7 km	MPC · JPL
781179	2013 CP_{258}	—	February 1, 2013	Calar Alto-CASADO	Mottola, S.	·	1.3 km	MPC · JPL
781180	2013 CU_{258}	—	February 9, 2013	Haleakala	Pan-STARRS 1	·	2.3 km	MPC · JPL
781181	2013 CV_{258}	—	February 8, 2013	Haleakala	Pan-STARRS 1	·	2.2 km	MPC · JPL
781182	2013 CG_{261}	—	February 14, 2013	Haleakala	Pan-STARRS 1	·	2.9 km	MPC · JPL
781183	2013 CH_{261}	—	February 5, 2013	Mount Lemmon	Mount Lemmon Survey	VER	2.0 km	MPC · JPL
781184	2013 CM_{261}	—	February 3, 2013	Haleakala	Pan-STARRS 1	VER	1.7 km	MPC · JPL
781185	2013 CN_{261}	—	February 6, 2013	Kitt Peak	Spacewatch	·	2.2 km	MPC · JPL
781186	2013 CB_{262}	—	February 9, 2013	Haleakala	Pan-STARRS 1	·	2.1 km	MPC · JPL
781187	2013 CF_{262}	—	September 2, 2010	Mount Lemmon	Mount Lemmon Survey	·	2.0 km	MPC · JPL
781188	2013 CL_{263}	—	February 8, 2013	Haleakala	Pan-STARRS 1	·	840 m	MPC · JPL
781189	2013 CQ_{263}	—	November 25, 2011	Haleakala	Pan-STARRS 1	·	2.1 km	MPC · JPL
781190	2013 CG_{264}	—	February 13, 2013	Haleakala	Pan-STARRS 1	L4	6.0 km	MPC · JPL
781191	2013 CT_{264}	—	February 13, 2013	Haleakala	Pan-STARRS 1	L4	6.2 km	MPC · JPL
781192	2013 DY_{4}	—	February 9, 2013	Haleakala	Pan-STARRS 1	MIS	1.9 km	MPC · JPL
781193	2013 DY_{10}	—	October 18, 2003	Kitt Peak	Spacewatch	(5)	830 m	MPC · JPL
781194	2013 DN_{13}	—	January 21, 2013	Haleakala	Pan-STARRS 1	·	1.1 km	MPC · JPL
781195	2013 DQ_{14}	—	January 20, 2013	Kitt Peak	Spacewatch	·	2.3 km	MPC · JPL
781196	2013 DE_{15}	—	February 17, 2013	Mount Lemmon	Mount Lemmon Survey	·	2.1 km	MPC · JPL
781197	2013 DS_{17}	—	March 10, 2005	Mount Lemmon	Mount Lemmon Survey	·	860 m	MPC · JPL
781198	2013 DD_{18}	—	February 18, 2013	Nogales	M. Schwartz, P. R. Holvorcem	·	1.7 km	MPC · JPL
781199	2013 DP_{19}	—	July 25, 2015	Haleakala	Pan-STARRS 1	TIR	2.0 km	MPC · JPL
781200	2013 DW_{19}	—	June 15, 2015	Haleakala	Pan-STARRS 1	·	2.3 km	MPC · JPL

== 781201–781300 ==
back to top

Designation			Discovery			Properties		Ref
Permanent	Provisional	Named after	Date	Site	Discoverer(s)	Category	Diam.	Ref
781201	2013 DX_{19}	—	February 16, 2013	Mount Lemmon	Mount Lemmon Survey	(5)	790 m	MPC · JPL
781202	2013 DZ_{19}	—	February 16, 2013	Kitt Peak	Spacewatch	·	1.4 km	MPC · JPL
781203	2013 DG_{21}	—	February 18, 2013	Kitt Peak	Spacewatch	·	1.4 km	MPC · JPL
781204	2013 DN_{21}	—	February 16, 2013	Mount Lemmon	Mount Lemmon Survey	PAD	1.2 km	MPC · JPL
781205	2013 DM_{22}	—	February 16, 2013	Mount Lemmon	Mount Lemmon Survey	T_{j} (2.98)	2.9 km	MPC · JPL
781206	2013 DG_{23}	—	February 16, 2013	Mount Lemmon	Mount Lemmon Survey	·	690 m	MPC · JPL
781207	2013 DR_{23}	—	February 16, 2013	Kitt Peak	Spacewatch	·	580 m	MPC · JPL
781208	2013 EP_{3}	—	February 15, 2013	Haleakala	Pan-STARRS 1	·	720 m	MPC · JPL
781209	2013 EY_{3}	—	October 19, 2011	Mount Lemmon	Mount Lemmon Survey	·	1.2 km	MPC · JPL
781210	2013 EJ_{5}	—	February 15, 2013	Haleakala	Pan-STARRS 1	·	2.1 km	MPC · JPL
781211	2013 EP_{9}	—	February 14, 2013	Haleakala	Pan-STARRS 1	L4	5.6 km	MPC · JPL
781212	2013 EB_{12}	—	February 20, 2004	Bergisch Gladbach	W. Bickel	·	1.4 km	MPC · JPL
781213	2013 ED_{13}	—	September 13, 2007	Mount Lemmon	Mount Lemmon Survey	(5)	710 m	MPC · JPL
781214	2013 ES_{13}	—	February 14, 2013	Haleakala	Pan-STARRS 1	·	850 m	MPC · JPL
781215	2013 EF_{22}	—	February 18, 2013	Kitt Peak	Spacewatch	·	2.6 km	MPC · JPL
781216	2013 EC_{25}	—	February 14, 2013	Kitt Peak	Spacewatch	EUP	2.8 km	MPC · JPL
781217	2013 ER_{35}	—	March 6, 2013	Haleakala	Pan-STARRS 1	L4	5.4 km	MPC · JPL
781218	2013 EE_{36}	—	March 21, 2009	Kitt Peak	Spacewatch	·	840 m	MPC · JPL
781219	2013 ET_{36}	—	March 8, 2013	Haleakala	Pan-STARRS 1	HOF	1.9 km	MPC · JPL
781220	2013 EX_{37}	—	September 17, 2010	Mount Lemmon	Mount Lemmon Survey	·	2.9 km	MPC · JPL
781221	2013 EP_{38}	—	March 8, 2013	Haleakala	Pan-STARRS 1	·	770 m	MPC · JPL
781222	2013 EP_{43}	—	March 6, 2013	Haleakala	Pan-STARRS 1	L4	6.2 km	MPC · JPL
781223	2013 EO_{44}	—	March 6, 2013	Haleakala	Pan-STARRS 1	KOR	1.2 km	MPC · JPL
781224	2013 EB_{47}	—	March 6, 2013	Haleakala	Pan-STARRS 1	·	1.5 km	MPC · JPL
781225	2013 EP_{52}	—	March 8, 2013	Haleakala	Pan-STARRS 1	·	1.2 km	MPC · JPL
781226	2013 EZ_{52}	—	March 8, 2013	Haleakala	Pan-STARRS 1	VER	2.1 km	MPC · JPL
781227	2013 ES_{54}	—	March 8, 2013	Haleakala	Pan-STARRS 1	·	1.3 km	MPC · JPL
781228	2013 ER_{59}	—	March 8, 2013	Haleakala	Pan-STARRS 1	·	1.1 km	MPC · JPL
781229	2013 EZ_{63}	—	March 8, 2008	Mount Lemmon	Mount Lemmon Survey	TRE	1.8 km	MPC · JPL
781230	2013 EK_{74}	—	March 7, 2013	Mount Lemmon	Mount Lemmon Survey	·	1.9 km	MPC · JPL
781231	2013 EF_{78}	—	March 8, 2013	Haleakala	Pan-STARRS 1	·	2.1 km	MPC · JPL
781232	2013 EQ_{79}	—	March 8, 2013	Haleakala	Pan-STARRS 1	·	860 m	MPC · JPL
781233	2013 EC_{87}	—	March 12, 2013	Kitt Peak	Spacewatch	·	910 m	MPC · JPL
781234	2013 EX_{95}	—	November 18, 2007	Mount Lemmon	Mount Lemmon Survey	·	810 m	MPC · JPL
781235	2013 EG_{102}	—	March 11, 2013	Kitt Peak	Spacewatch	EUN	950 m	MPC · JPL
781236	2013 ET_{105}	—	March 4, 2013	Haleakala	Pan-STARRS 1	·	1.1 km	MPC · JPL
781237	2013 EB_{122}	—	March 8, 2013	Haleakala	Pan-STARRS 1	·	1.1 km	MPC · JPL
781238	2013 EO_{122}	—	September 17, 2006	Kitt Peak	Spacewatch	·	1.2 km	MPC · JPL
781239	2013 EB_{125}	—	March 13, 2013	Kitt Peak	Spacewatch	·	980 m	MPC · JPL
781240	2013 EN_{130}	—	March 3, 2009	Kitt Peak	Spacewatch	·	1.1 km	MPC · JPL
781241	2013 EP_{132}	—	March 12, 2013	Kitt Peak	Research and Education Collaborative Occultation Network	·	880 m	MPC · JPL
781242	2013 EB_{136}	—	April 13, 2013	Haleakala	Pan-STARRS 1	·	790 m	MPC · JPL
781243	2013 EQ_{141}	—	February 13, 2013	Mount Teide	E. Schwab	·	670 m	MPC · JPL
781244	2013 EH_{146}	—	April 21, 2009	Mount Lemmon	Mount Lemmon Survey	·	1.2 km	MPC · JPL
781245	2013 EY_{146}	—	February 14, 2013	Haleakala	Pan-STARRS 1	·	1.4 km	MPC · JPL
781246	2013 EA_{147}	—	November 17, 1999	Kitt Peak	Spacewatch	·	580 m	MPC · JPL
781247	2013 EX_{147}	—	March 20, 1999	Apache Point	SDSS	·	1.4 km	MPC · JPL
781248	2013 EP_{149}	—	October 25, 2011	Haleakala	Pan-STARRS 1	MIS	1.4 km	MPC · JPL
781249	2013 EX_{152}	—	April 12, 2013	Haleakala	Pan-STARRS 1	MAR	860 m	MPC · JPL
781250	2013 EU_{157}	—	February 27, 2004	Kitt Peak	Deep Ecliptic Survey	·	1.2 km	MPC · JPL
781251	2013 ER_{158}	—	March 7, 2013	Kitt Peak	Spacewatch	·	870 m	MPC · JPL
781252	2013 ES_{158}	—	November 5, 2007	Mount Lemmon	Mount Lemmon Survey	·	690 m	MPC · JPL
781253	2013 EN_{159}	—	March 12, 2013	Mount Lemmon	Mount Lemmon Survey	·	1.0 km	MPC · JPL
781254	2013 EW_{159}	—	January 4, 2017	Haleakala	Pan-STARRS 1	·	910 m	MPC · JPL
781255	2013 ER_{160}	—	March 13, 2013	Haleakala	Pan-STARRS 1	·	1.2 km	MPC · JPL
781256	2013 EY_{160}	—	March 13, 2013	Haleakala	Pan-STARRS 1	·	1.1 km	MPC · JPL
781257	2013 ES_{161}	—	March 13, 2013	Haleakala	Pan-STARRS 1	·	880 m	MPC · JPL
781258	2013 ED_{167}	—	March 12, 2013	Mount Lemmon	Mount Lemmon Survey	·	1.0 km	MPC · JPL
781259	2013 EM_{167}	—	March 8, 2013	Haleakala	Pan-STARRS 1	·	880 m	MPC · JPL
781260	2013 EC_{168}	—	March 5, 2013	Haleakala	Pan-STARRS 1	·	1.1 km	MPC · JPL
781261	2013 EJ_{168}	—	March 8, 2013	Haleakala	Pan-STARRS 1	·	2.2 km	MPC · JPL
781262	2013 EK_{171}	—	March 5, 2013	Haleakala	Pan-STARRS 1	·	810 m	MPC · JPL
781263	2013 ED_{172}	—	March 6, 2013	Haleakala	Pan-STARRS 1	·	1.8 km	MPC · JPL
781264	2013 EE_{173}	—	March 4, 2013	Haleakala	Pan-STARRS 1	·	1.2 km	MPC · JPL
781265	2013 EF_{175}	—	March 5, 2013	Mount Lemmon	Mount Lemmon Survey	·	1.2 km	MPC · JPL
781266	2013 EF_{178}	—	March 5, 2013	Haleakala	Pan-STARRS 1	·	1.4 km	MPC · JPL
781267	2013 ET_{180}	—	March 4, 2013	Haleakala	Pan-STARRS 1	L4	6.5 km	MPC · JPL
781268	2013 EB_{181}	—	March 5, 2013	Mount Lemmon	Mount Lemmon Survey	L4	5.4 km	MPC · JPL
781269	2013 EQ_{181}	—	March 13, 2013	Mount Lemmon	Mount Lemmon Survey	·	2.7 km	MPC · JPL
781270	2013 EX_{182}	—	March 8, 2013	Haleakala	Pan-STARRS 1	·	2.0 km	MPC · JPL
781271	2013 EA_{183}	—	March 2, 2013	Mount Lemmon	Mount Lemmon Survey	·	1.3 km	MPC · JPL
781272	2013 EW_{183}	—	March 8, 2013	Haleakala	Pan-STARRS 1	·	2.5 km	MPC · JPL
781273	2013 EL_{185}	—	March 8, 2013	Haleakala	Pan-STARRS 1	·	1.4 km	MPC · JPL
781274	2013 EO_{185}	—	April 24, 2009	Mount Lemmon	Mount Lemmon Survey	·	1.1 km	MPC · JPL
781275	2013 ER_{185}	—	March 5, 2013	Mount Lemmon	Mount Lemmon Survey	·	880 m	MPC · JPL
781276	2013 EM_{187}	—	March 5, 2013	Haleakala	Pan-STARRS 1	·	1.0 km	MPC · JPL
781277	2013 ED_{190}	—	March 14, 2013	Mount Lemmon	Mount Lemmon Survey	·	840 m	MPC · JPL
781278	2013 FG_{15}	—	March 17, 2004	Kitt Peak	Spacewatch	·	1.2 km	MPC · JPL
781279	2013 FB_{30}	—	March 19, 2013	Haleakala	Pan-STARRS 1	·	740 m	MPC · JPL
781280	2013 FH_{36}	—	March 19, 2013	Haleakala	Pan-STARRS 1	HOF	2.0 km	MPC · JPL
781281	2013 FK_{36}	—	March 18, 2013	Mount Lemmon	Mount Lemmon Survey	·	1.6 km	MPC · JPL
781282	2013 FN_{36}	—	October 10, 2015	Haleakala	Pan-STARRS 1	·	1.4 km	MPC · JPL
781283	2013 FB_{37}	—	March 18, 2013	Kitt Peak	Spacewatch	(5)	880 m	MPC · JPL
781284	2013 FS_{39}	—	March 31, 2013	Mount Lemmon	Mount Lemmon Survey	·	850 m	MPC · JPL
781285	2013 FX_{40}	—	March 31, 2013	Mount Lemmon	Mount Lemmon Survey	·	900 m	MPC · JPL
781286	2013 FD_{42}	—	March 19, 2013	Haleakala	Pan-STARRS 1	·	910 m	MPC · JPL
781287	2013 FZ_{44}	—	March 19, 2013	Haleakala	Pan-STARRS 1	·	1.6 km	MPC · JPL
781288	2013 GH_{6}	—	March 19, 2013	Haleakala	Pan-STARRS 1	·	1.4 km	MPC · JPL
781289	2013 GU_{9}	—	April 24, 2004	Kitt Peak	Spacewatch	(13314)	1.3 km	MPC · JPL
781290	2013 GN_{16}	—	April 4, 2013	Haleakala	Pan-STARRS 1	·	680 m	MPC · JPL
781291	2013 GN_{18}	—	March 5, 2013	Mount Lemmon	Mount Lemmon Survey	·	810 m	MPC · JPL
781292	2013 GV_{18}	—	April 5, 2013	Palomar	Palomar Transient Factory	·	1.5 km	MPC · JPL
781293	2013 GS_{19}	—	April 5, 2013	Haleakala	Pan-STARRS 1	·	970 m	MPC · JPL
781294	2013 GX_{29}	—	April 24, 2009	Mount Lemmon	Mount Lemmon Survey	·	980 m	MPC · JPL
781295	2013 GZ_{32}	—	March 16, 2013	Mount Lemmon	Mount Lemmon Survey	·	1.2 km	MPC · JPL
781296	2013 GK_{34}	—	April 5, 2013	Haleakala	Pan-STARRS 1	BRG	1.0 km	MPC · JPL
781297	2013 GV_{35}	—	April 7, 2013	Mount Lemmon	Mount Lemmon Survey	KOR	940 m	MPC · JPL
781298	2013 GB_{36}	—	April 22, 2009	Mount Lemmon	Mount Lemmon Survey	KON	1.5 km	MPC · JPL
781299	2013 GT_{41}	—	April 8, 2013	Mount Lemmon	Mount Lemmon Survey	·	2.1 km	MPC · JPL
781300	2013 GW_{45}	—	March 19, 2013	Haleakala	Pan-STARRS 1	·	1.5 km	MPC · JPL

== 781301–781400 ==
back to top

Designation			Discovery			Properties		Ref
Permanent	Provisional	Named after	Date	Site	Discoverer(s)	Category	Diam.	Ref
781301	2013 GN_{51}	—	April 10, 2013	Mount Lemmon	Mount Lemmon Survey	·	1.1 km	MPC · JPL
781302	2013 GZ_{54}	—	April 30, 2005	Kitt Peak	Spacewatch	BAR	1 km	MPC · JPL
781303	2013 GV_{57}	—	October 14, 2010	Mount Lemmon	Mount Lemmon Survey	BRG	1.1 km	MPC · JPL
781304	2013 GF_{62}	—	March 18, 2013	Kitt Peak	Spacewatch	BRG	960 m	MPC · JPL
781305	2013 GN_{62}	—	April 7, 2013	Mount Lemmon	Mount Lemmon Survey	·	1.1 km	MPC · JPL
781306	2013 GT_{77}	—	April 7, 2013	Mount Lemmon	Mount Lemmon Survey	·	820 m	MPC · JPL
781307	2013 GD_{80}	—	April 13, 2013	Mount Teide	E. Schwab	·	1.2 km	MPC · JPL
781308	2013 GL_{86}	—	April 14, 2013	Mount Lemmon	Mount Lemmon Survey	·	1.6 km	MPC · JPL
781309	2013 GE_{87}	—	April 14, 2013	Palomar	Palomar Transient Factory	·	1.3 km	MPC · JPL
781310	2013 GN_{88}	—	April 17, 2009	Charleston	R. Holmes, H. Devore	·	950 m	MPC · JPL
781311	2013 GR_{89}	—	February 5, 2013	Mount Lemmon	Mount Lemmon Survey	·	1.2 km	MPC · JPL
781312	2013 GD_{107}	—	April 30, 2009	Mount Lemmon	Mount Lemmon Survey	·	730 m	MPC · JPL
781313	2013 GS_{121}	—	April 8, 2013	Mount Lemmon	Mount Lemmon Survey	·	890 m	MPC · JPL
781314	2013 GZ_{125}	—	April 11, 2013	Kitt Peak	Spacewatch	·	1.1 km	MPC · JPL
781315	2013 GA_{128}	—	April 15, 2013	Haleakala	Pan-STARRS 1	·	910 m	MPC · JPL
781316	2013 GK_{128}	—	April 3, 2013	Palomar	Palomar Transient Factory	ADE	1.4 km	MPC · JPL
781317	2013 GM_{134}	—	March 14, 2013	Kitt Peak	Spacewatch	·	1.6 km	MPC · JPL
781318	2013 GY_{135}	—	March 18, 2013	Mount Lemmon	Mount Lemmon Survey	·	1.0 km	MPC · JPL
781319	2013 GA_{139}	—	April 12, 2013	Haleakala	Pan-STARRS 1	·	1.9 km	MPC · JPL
781320	2013 GF_{140}	—	April 7, 2013	Kitt Peak	Spacewatch	BRG	1.1 km	MPC · JPL
781321	2013 GT_{140}	—	April 13, 2013	Kitt Peak	Spacewatch	(194)	1.1 km	MPC · JPL
781322	2013 GV_{140}	—	April 13, 2013	Haleakala	Pan-STARRS 1	·	1.5 km	MPC · JPL
781323	2013 GB_{142}	—	June 3, 2014	Haleakala	Pan-STARRS 1	·	1.2 km	MPC · JPL
781324	2013 GR_{142}	—	April 5, 2013	Palomar	Palomar Transient Factory	EUN	1.0 km	MPC · JPL
781325	2013 GJ_{143}	—	April 9, 2013	Haleakala	Pan-STARRS 1	·	1.4 km	MPC · JPL
781326	2013 GK_{143}	—	April 12, 2013	Haleakala	Pan-STARRS 1	·	960 m	MPC · JPL
781327	2013 GT_{143}	—	April 11, 2013	Mount Lemmon	Mount Lemmon Survey	·	1.5 km	MPC · JPL
781328	2013 GZ_{145}	—	April 11, 2013	Mount Lemmon	Mount Lemmon Survey	·	990 m	MPC · JPL
781329	2013 GW_{146}	—	March 20, 2017	Haleakala	Pan-STARRS 1	·	1.2 km	MPC · JPL
781330	2013 GB_{147}	—	April 13, 2013	Kitt Peak	Spacewatch	·	1.2 km	MPC · JPL
781331	2013 GK_{147}	—	April 10, 2013	Mount Lemmon	Mount Lemmon Survey	·	1.9 km	MPC · JPL
781332	2013 GE_{148}	—	April 15, 2013	Haleakala	Pan-STARRS 1	EUN	770 m	MPC · JPL
781333	2013 GL_{148}	—	April 6, 2013	Mount Lemmon	Mount Lemmon Survey	·	990 m	MPC · JPL
781334	2013 GO_{148}	—	March 4, 2017	Haleakala	Pan-STARRS 1	·	800 m	MPC · JPL
781335	2013 GZ_{149}	—	April 10, 2013	Haleakala	Pan-STARRS 1	RAF	530 m	MPC · JPL
781336	2013 GG_{150}	—	April 11, 2013	Kitt Peak	Spacewatch	·	1.1 km	MPC · JPL
781337	2013 GW_{150}	—	April 13, 2013	Haleakala	Pan-STARRS 1	·	1.1 km	MPC · JPL
781338	2013 GX_{150}	—	April 12, 2013	Haleakala	Pan-STARRS 1	·	700 m	MPC · JPL
781339	2013 GL_{154}	—	April 11, 2013	Kitt Peak	Spacewatch	EOS	1.5 km	MPC · JPL
781340	2013 GF_{155}	—	April 10, 2013	Haleakala	Pan-STARRS 1	·	1.0 km	MPC · JPL
781341	2013 GP_{155}	—	April 7, 2013	Oukaïmeden	M. Ory	·	2.6 km	MPC · JPL
781342	2013 GC_{157}	—	April 10, 2013	Haleakala	Pan-STARRS 1	·	1.2 km	MPC · JPL
781343	2013 GW_{157}	—	April 15, 2013	Haleakala	Pan-STARRS 1	·	1.1 km	MPC · JPL
781344	2013 GY_{157}	—	April 2, 2013	Catalina	CSS	·	1.3 km	MPC · JPL
781345	2013 GT_{158}	—	September 4, 2010	Mount Lemmon	Mount Lemmon Survey	AGN	810 m	MPC · JPL
781346	2013 GT_{159}	—	April 13, 2013	Haleakala	Pan-STARRS 1	·	1.3 km	MPC · JPL
781347	2013 GS_{161}	—	April 10, 2013	Haleakala	Pan-STARRS 1	·	2.4 km	MPC · JPL
781348	2013 GV_{162}	—	April 13, 2013	Kitt Peak	Spacewatch	·	940 m	MPC · JPL
781349	2013 GA_{163}	—	April 1, 2013	Kitt Peak	Spacewatch	EUN	630 m	MPC · JPL
781350	2013 GE_{164}	—	April 9, 2013	Haleakala	Pan-STARRS 1	·	890 m	MPC · JPL
781351	2013 GP_{164}	—	April 10, 2013	Mount Lemmon	Mount Lemmon Survey	DOR	1.6 km	MPC · JPL
781352	2013 GG_{165}	—	April 10, 2013	Haleakala	Pan-STARRS 1	·	830 m	MPC · JPL
781353	2013 GM_{166}	—	April 12, 2013	Mount Lemmon	Mount Lemmon Survey	·	1.6 km	MPC · JPL
781354	2013 GO_{166}	—	April 11, 2013	Kitt Peak	Spacewatch	EOS	1.3 km	MPC · JPL
781355	2013 GY_{166}	—	April 12, 2013	Haleakala	Pan-STARRS 1	·	1.4 km	MPC · JPL
781356	2013 GF_{167}	—	April 10, 2013	Haleakala	Pan-STARRS 1	·	1.2 km	MPC · JPL
781357	2013 GY_{170}	—	April 10, 2013	Haleakala	Pan-STARRS 1	·	1.3 km	MPC · JPL
781358	2013 HH_{1}	—	April 16, 2013	Oukaïmeden	M. Ory	·	1.2 km	MPC · JPL
781359	2013 HP_{10}	—	March 16, 2013	Catalina	CSS	·	1.5 km	MPC · JPL
781360	2013 HV_{22}	—	April 18, 2013	Haleakala	Pan-STARRS 1	·	1.7 km	MPC · JPL
781361	2013 HU_{24}	—	April 13, 2013	Haleakala	Pan-STARRS 1	EUN	720 m	MPC · JPL
781362	2013 HK_{27}	—	February 26, 2008	Mount Lemmon	Mount Lemmon Survey	·	1.3 km	MPC · JPL
781363	2013 HR_{27}	—	January 14, 2008	Kitt Peak	Spacewatch	·	1.2 km	MPC · JPL
781364	2013 HQ_{34}	—	April 16, 2013	Cerro Tololo-DECam	DECam	EUN	660 m	MPC · JPL
781365	2013 HX_{39}	—	April 16, 2013	Cerro Tololo-DECam	DECam	·	1.2 km	MPC · JPL
781366	2013 HL_{41}	—	April 9, 2013	Haleakala	Pan-STARRS 1	·	1.2 km	MPC · JPL
781367	2013 HU_{45}	—	November 3, 2005	Mount Lemmon	Mount Lemmon Survey	·	1.6 km	MPC · JPL
781368	2013 HN_{46}	—	April 16, 2013	Cerro Tololo-DECam	DECam	·	860 m	MPC · JPL
781369	2013 HT_{46}	—	April 16, 2013	Cerro Tololo-DECam	DECam	·	1.1 km	MPC · JPL
781370	2013 HP_{47}	—	April 16, 2013	Cerro Tololo-DECam	DECam	·	860 m	MPC · JPL
781371	2013 HV_{49}	—	April 16, 2013	Cerro Tololo-DECam	DECam	·	1.9 km	MPC · JPL
781372	2013 HS_{54}	—	April 16, 2013	Cerro Tololo-DECam	DECam	·	680 m	MPC · JPL
781373	2013 HW_{56}	—	September 17, 2010	Mount Lemmon	Mount Lemmon Survey	·	1.1 km	MPC · JPL
781374	2013 HQ_{58}	—	April 9, 2013	Haleakala	Pan-STARRS 1	·	950 m	MPC · JPL
781375	2013 HV_{59}	—	April 9, 2013	Haleakala	Pan-STARRS 1	·	1.2 km	MPC · JPL
781376	2013 HH_{62}	—	April 16, 2013	Cerro Tololo-DECam	DECam	·	1.2 km	MPC · JPL
781377	2013 HL_{62}	—	April 16, 2013	Cerro Tololo-DECam	DECam	·	600 m	MPC · JPL
781378	2013 HF_{63}	—	April 9, 2013	Haleakala	Pan-STARRS 1	EOS	1.1 km	MPC · JPL
781379	2013 HP_{66}	—	April 16, 2013	Cerro Tololo-DECam	DECam	·	1.2 km	MPC · JPL
781380	2013 HT_{67}	—	April 16, 2013	Cerro Tololo-DECam	DECam	RAF	570 m	MPC · JPL
781381	2013 HL_{71}	—	April 16, 2013	Cerro Tololo-DECam	DECam	·	890 m	MPC · JPL
781382	2013 HS_{71}	—	February 13, 2008	Kitt Peak	Spacewatch	AEO	770 m	MPC · JPL
781383	2013 HY_{72}	—	October 17, 2010	Mount Lemmon	Mount Lemmon Survey	·	1.0 km	MPC · JPL
781384	2013 HD_{73}	—	April 16, 2013	Cerro Tololo-DECam	DECam	WIT	660 m	MPC · JPL
781385	2013 HN_{75}	—	April 16, 2013	Cerro Tololo-DECam	DECam	LIX	2.3 km	MPC · JPL
781386	2013 HG_{78}	—	April 9, 2013	Haleakala	Pan-STARRS 1	·	860 m	MPC · JPL
781387	2013 HN_{80}	—	November 3, 2010	Mount Lemmon	Mount Lemmon Survey	VER	1.9 km	MPC · JPL
781388	2013 HR_{81}	—	April 16, 2013	Cerro Tololo-DECam	DECam	·	1.2 km	MPC · JPL
781389	2013 HA_{82}	—	April 9, 2013	Haleakala	Pan-STARRS 1	KOR	890 m	MPC · JPL
781390	2013 HD_{84}	—	April 16, 2013	Cerro Tololo-DECam	DECam	·	730 m	MPC · JPL
781391	2013 HH_{84}	—	April 16, 2013	Cerro Tololo-DECam	DECam	·	890 m	MPC · JPL
781392	2013 HX_{85}	—	March 5, 2013	Haleakala	Pan-STARRS 1	(5)	900 m	MPC · JPL
781393	2013 HY_{86}	—	April 16, 2013	Cerro Tololo-DECam	DECam	·	960 m	MPC · JPL
781394	2013 HZ_{86}	—	April 9, 2013	Haleakala	Pan-STARRS 1	·	750 m	MPC · JPL
781395	2013 HZ_{92}	—	January 12, 2008	Kitt Peak	Spacewatch	AEO	850 m	MPC · JPL
781396	2013 HA_{95}	—	April 16, 2013	Cerro Tololo-DECam	DECam	·	940 m	MPC · JPL
781397	2013 HZ_{97}	—	March 15, 2013	Kitt Peak	Spacewatch	·	810 m	MPC · JPL
781398	2013 HW_{100}	—	April 16, 2013	Cerro Tololo-DECam	DECam	·	1.3 km	MPC · JPL
781399	2013 HM_{102}	—	December 30, 2007	Mount Lemmon	Mount Lemmon Survey	·	780 m	MPC · JPL
781400	2013 HH_{106}	—	April 16, 2013	Cerro Tololo-DECam	DECam	KOR	820 m	MPC · JPL

== 781401–781500 ==
back to top

Designation			Discovery			Properties		Ref
Permanent	Provisional	Named after	Date	Site	Discoverer(s)	Category	Diam.	Ref
781401	2013 HX_{112}	—	October 19, 2006	Mount Lemmon	Mount Lemmon Survey	·	1.2 km	MPC · JPL
781402	2013 HD_{124}	—	April 9, 2013	Haleakala	Pan-STARRS 1	·	2.2 km	MPC · JPL
781403	2013 HJ_{127}	—	April 17, 2013	Cerro Tololo-DECam	DECam	·	1.5 km	MPC · JPL
781404	2013 HS_{129}	—	April 9, 2013	Haleakala	Pan-STARRS 1	·	1.3 km	MPC · JPL
781405	2013 HC_{130}	—	April 9, 2013	Haleakala	Pan-STARRS 1	MAR	730 m	MPC · JPL
781406	2013 HC_{132}	—	April 17, 2013	Cerro Tololo-DECam	DECam	·	970 m	MPC · JPL
781407	2013 HH_{132}	—	April 17, 2013	Cerro Tololo-DECam	DECam	KON	1.6 km	MPC · JPL
781408	2013 HY_{133}	—	April 17, 2013	Cerro Tololo-DECam	DECam	·	1.1 km	MPC · JPL
781409	2013 HE_{134}	—	April 9, 2013	Haleakala	Pan-STARRS 1	·	830 m	MPC · JPL
781410	2013 HG_{134}	—	April 17, 2013	Cerro Tololo-DECam	DECam	HOF	1.6 km	MPC · JPL
781411	2013 HB_{135}	—	April 14, 2013	Calar Alto	F. Hormuth	·	1.3 km	MPC · JPL
781412	2013 HT_{141}	—	April 17, 2013	Cerro Tololo-DECam	DECam	·	1.2 km	MPC · JPL
781413	2013 HE_{144}	—	April 16, 2013	Cerro Tololo-DECam	DECam	·	1.6 km	MPC · JPL
781414	2013 HM_{145}	—	April 9, 2013	Haleakala	Pan-STARRS 1	·	1.2 km	MPC · JPL
781415	2013 HX_{145}	—	April 9, 2013	Haleakala	Pan-STARRS 1	·	1.1 km	MPC · JPL
781416	2013 HB_{149}	—	April 17, 2013	Cerro Tololo-DECam	DECam	(5)	790 m	MPC · JPL
781417	2013 HL_{150}	—	April 17, 2013	Cerro Tololo-DECam	DECam	(5)	1.1 km	MPC · JPL
781418	2013 HW_{151}	—	July 27, 2014	Haleakala	Pan-STARRS 1	·	1.1 km	MPC · JPL
781419	2013 HU_{155}	—	October 20, 2006	Kitt Peak	Spacewatch	·	850 m	MPC · JPL
781420	2013 HV_{157}	—	April 19, 2013	Haleakala	Pan-STARRS 1	·	1.4 km	MPC · JPL
781421	2013 HQ_{158}	—	April 22, 2013	Haleakala	Pan-STARRS 1	·	1.2 km	MPC · JPL
781422	2013 HR_{158}	—	April 16, 2013	Haleakala	Pan-STARRS 1	·	1.3 km	MPC · JPL
781423	2013 HC_{159}	—	April 21, 2013	Catalina	CSS	JUN	1.0 km	MPC · JPL
781424	2013 HH_{159}	—	April 19, 2013	Mount Lemmon	Mount Lemmon Survey	·	920 m	MPC · JPL
781425	2013 HP_{160}	—	April 16, 2013	Haleakala	Pan-STARRS 1	HNS	790 m	MPC · JPL
781426	2013 HQ_{160}	—	October 7, 2014	Haleakala	Pan-STARRS 1	·	1.6 km	MPC · JPL
781427	2013 HK_{161}	—	February 4, 2017	Haleakala	Pan-STARRS 1	·	1.2 km	MPC · JPL
781428	2013 HR_{161}	—	April 16, 2013	Haleakala	Pan-STARRS 1	·	920 m	MPC · JPL
781429	2013 HO_{164}	—	April 19, 2013	Mount Lemmon	Mount Lemmon Survey	·	1.0 km	MPC · JPL
781430	2013 HU_{165}	—	April 17, 2013	Haleakala	Pan-STARRS 1	·	1.0 km	MPC · JPL
781431	2013 JS_{9}	—	May 5, 2013	Haleakala	Pan-STARRS 1	·	970 m	MPC · JPL
781432	2013 JF_{11}	—	April 13, 2013	Haleakala	Pan-STARRS 1	·	730 m	MPC · JPL
781433	2013 JL_{13}	—	May 8, 2013	Haleakala	Pan-STARRS 1	·	1.1 km	MPC · JPL
781434	2013 JK_{21}	—	May 10, 2013	Kitt Peak	Spacewatch	·	920 m	MPC · JPL
781435	2013 JD_{22}	—	April 16, 2013	Haleakala	Pan-STARRS 1	·	1.0 km	MPC · JPL
781436	2013 JQ_{24}	—	September 18, 2010	Mount Lemmon	Mount Lemmon Survey	·	1.2 km	MPC · JPL
781437	2013 JT_{27}	—	May 11, 2013	Kitt Peak	Spacewatch	·	1.2 km	MPC · JPL
781438	2013 JQ_{33}	—	April 10, 2013	Haleakala	Pan-STARRS 1	·	1.7 km	MPC · JPL
781439	2013 JU_{36}	—	May 11, 2013	Catalina	CSS	·	1.3 km	MPC · JPL
781440	2013 JZ_{48}	—	April 19, 2013	Haleakala	Pan-STARRS 1	·	1.6 km	MPC · JPL
781441	2013 JQ_{51}	—	April 15, 2013	Haleakala	Pan-STARRS 1	·	780 m	MPC · JPL
781442	2013 JA_{59}	—	May 1, 2013	Mount Lemmon	Mount Lemmon Survey	·	1.2 km	MPC · JPL
781443	2013 JS_{59}	—	April 13, 2013	Haleakala	Pan-STARRS 1	MIS	2.2 km	MPC · JPL
781444	2013 JY_{66}	—	May 12, 2013	Haleakala	Pan-STARRS 1	·	1.4 km	MPC · JPL
781445	2013 JZ_{66}	—	May 15, 2013	Mount Lemmon	Mount Lemmon Survey	·	1.6 km	MPC · JPL
781446	2013 JM_{68}	—	May 7, 2013	Mount Lemmon	Mount Lemmon Survey	·	970 m	MPC · JPL
781447	2013 JK_{69}	—	September 18, 2014	Haleakala	Pan-STARRS 1	KON	1.6 km	MPC · JPL
781448	2013 JP_{69}	—	August 26, 2014	Haleakala	Pan-STARRS 1	·	1.6 km	MPC · JPL
781449	2013 JQ_{69}	—	May 2, 2013	Nogales	M. Schwartz, P. R. Holvorcem	·	1.2 km	MPC · JPL
781450	2013 JV_{69}	—	May 12, 2013	Mount Lemmon	Mount Lemmon Survey	·	770 m	MPC · JPL
781451	2013 JA_{70}	—	May 8, 2013	Haleakala	Pan-STARRS 1	·	850 m	MPC · JPL
781452	2013 JM_{71}	—	July 30, 2014	Haleakala	Pan-STARRS 1	·	1.2 km	MPC · JPL
781453	2013 JP_{71}	—	September 24, 2014	Mount Lemmon	Mount Lemmon Survey	·	1.1 km	MPC · JPL
781454	2013 JU_{71}	—	August 28, 2014	Haleakala	Pan-STARRS 1	·	1.4 km	MPC · JPL
781455	2013 JC_{72}	—	August 22, 2014	Haleakala	Pan-STARRS 1	·	1.5 km	MPC · JPL
781456	2013 JX_{72}	—	January 28, 2016	Mount Lemmon	Mount Lemmon Survey	·	1.4 km	MPC · JPL
781457	2013 JS_{73}	—	May 12, 2013	Mount Lemmon	Mount Lemmon Survey	·	1 km	MPC · JPL
781458	2013 JZ_{73}	—	August 3, 2014	Haleakala	Pan-STARRS 1	MAR	790 m	MPC · JPL
781459	2013 JA_{75}	—	May 10, 2013	Kitt Peak	Spacewatch	·	1.0 km	MPC · JPL
781460	2013 JC_{76}	—	May 9, 2013	Haleakala	Pan-STARRS 1	·	1.2 km	MPC · JPL
781461	2013 JQ_{77}	—	May 13, 2013	Kitt Peak	Spacewatch	MAR	690 m	MPC · JPL
781462	2013 JM_{78}	—	May 8, 2013	Haleakala	Pan-STARRS 1	·	880 m	MPC · JPL
781463	2013 JV_{78}	—	May 5, 2013	Haleakala	Pan-STARRS 1	MAR	850 m	MPC · JPL
781464	2013 JS_{80}	—	May 10, 2013	Haleakala	Pan-STARRS 1	EOS	1.3 km	MPC · JPL
781465	2013 JQ_{81}	—	May 9, 2013	Haleakala	Pan-STARRS 1	·	860 m	MPC · JPL
781466	2013 KC	—	April 23, 2013	Haleakala	Pan-STARRS 1	·	1.3 km	MPC · JPL
781467	2013 KM_{10}	—	June 27, 2009	Mount Lemmon	Mount Lemmon Survey	·	1.4 km	MPC · JPL
781468	2013 KJ_{15}	—	May 30, 2013	Mount Lemmon	Mount Lemmon Survey	·	980 m	MPC · JPL
781469	2013 KU_{17}	—	May 21, 2013	Mount Lemmon	Mount Lemmon Survey	·	1.5 km	MPC · JPL
781470	2013 KJ_{20}	—	May 18, 2018	Mount Lemmon	Mount Lemmon Survey	·	1.5 km	MPC · JPL
781471	2013 KM_{20}	—	July 13, 2018	Haleakala	Pan-STARRS 1	HNS	850 m	MPC · JPL
781472	2013 KC_{22}	—	May 16, 2013	Mount Lemmon	Mount Lemmon Survey	·	830 m	MPC · JPL
781473	2013 KK_{22}	—	May 20, 2013	Kitt Peak	Spacewatch	TIN	690 m	MPC · JPL
781474	2013 LX_{5}	—	April 15, 2013	Haleakala	Pan-STARRS 1	·	960 m	MPC · JPL
781475	2013 LC_{13}	—	June 5, 2013	Mount Lemmon	Mount Lemmon Survey	·	1.4 km	MPC · JPL
781476	2013 LO_{15}	—	June 6, 2013	Mount Lemmon	Mount Lemmon Survey	·	1.4 km	MPC · JPL
781477	2013 LD_{17}	—	June 2, 2013	Mount Lemmon	Mount Lemmon Survey	·	1.2 km	MPC · JPL
781478	2013 LF_{22}	—	May 10, 2013	Calar Alto	F. Hormuth	·	1.1 km	MPC · JPL
781479	2013 LF_{24}	—	May 13, 2013	Mount Lemmon	Mount Lemmon Survey	·	940 m	MPC · JPL
781480	2013 LE_{25}	—	March 24, 2013	Catalina	CSS	·	1.2 km	MPC · JPL
781481	2013 LQ_{25}	—	May 18, 2013	Mount Lemmon	Mount Lemmon Survey	·	1.8 km	MPC · JPL
781482	2013 LF_{37}	—	June 4, 2013	Mount Lemmon	Mount Lemmon Survey	·	1.3 km	MPC · JPL
781483	2013 LQ_{37}	—	June 7, 2013	Kitt Peak	Spacewatch	·	860 m	MPC · JPL
781484	2013 LK_{38}	—	June 12, 2013	Haleakala	Pan-STARRS 1	·	990 m	MPC · JPL
781485	2013 LM_{40}	—	April 3, 2017	Haleakala	Pan-STARRS 1	·	1.2 km	MPC · JPL
781486	2013 LV_{40}	—	June 7, 2013	Haleakala	Pan-STARRS 1	·	1.3 km	MPC · JPL
781487	2013 LT_{41}	—	June 12, 2013	Haleakala	Pan-STARRS 1	·	1.1 km	MPC · JPL
781488	2013 LX_{41}	—	June 3, 2013	Mount Lemmon	Mount Lemmon Survey	·	990 m	MPC · JPL
781489	2013 LU_{43}	—	June 12, 2013	Haleakala	Pan-STARRS 1	·	1.5 km	MPC · JPL
781490	2013 LV_{43}	—	June 12, 2013	Haleakala	Pan-STARRS 1	EUN	960 m	MPC · JPL
781491	2013 LD_{46}	—	June 12, 2013	Oukaïmeden	M. Ory	·	1.3 km	MPC · JPL
781492	2013 MC_{3}	—	July 5, 2005	Kitt Peak	Spacewatch	3:2	4.6 km	MPC · JPL
781493	2013 MO_{7}	—	May 16, 2013	Haleakala	Pan-STARRS 1	·	1.3 km	MPC · JPL
781494	2013 MH_{13}	—	March 28, 2008	Mount Lemmon	Mount Lemmon Survey	·	1.1 km	MPC · JPL
781495	2013 MM_{14}	—	June 18, 2013	Haleakala	Pan-STARRS 1	·	1.1 km	MPC · JPL
781496	2013 MN_{15}	—	June 18, 2013	Haleakala	Pan-STARRS 1	EUN	870 m	MPC · JPL
781497	2013 MA_{16}	—	May 22, 2018	Haleakala	Pan-STARRS 1	·	1.1 km	MPC · JPL
781498	2013 MJ_{18}	—	June 30, 2013	Haleakala	Pan-STARRS 1	·	2.8 km	MPC · JPL
781499	2013 ME_{19}	—	June 18, 2013	Haleakala	Pan-STARRS 1	MRX	730 m	MPC · JPL
781500	2013 MF_{19}	—	June 18, 2013	Mount Lemmon	Mount Lemmon Survey	·	1.3 km	MPC · JPL

== 781501–781600 ==
back to top

Designation			Discovery			Properties		Ref
Permanent	Provisional	Named after	Date	Site	Discoverer(s)	Category	Diam.	Ref
781501	2013 MJ_{20}	—	June 18, 2013	Haleakala	Pan-STARRS 1	EUN	800 m	MPC · JPL
781502	2013 MZ_{20}	—	June 18, 2013	Haleakala	Pan-STARRS 1	·	1.4 km	MPC · JPL
781503	2013 MX_{22}	—	June 18, 2013	Haleakala	Pan-STARRS 1	·	1.3 km	MPC · JPL
781504	2013 NP_{4}	—	June 18, 2013	Haleakala	Pan-STARRS 1	·	1.5 km	MPC · JPL
781505	2013 NK_{12}	—	July 6, 2013	Haleakala	Pan-STARRS 1	·	2.1 km	MPC · JPL
781506	2013 NR_{25}	—	July 15, 2013	Haleakala	Pan-STARRS 1	·	1.1 km	MPC · JPL
781507	2013 NY_{25}	—	September 25, 2008	Mount Lemmon	Mount Lemmon Survey	EOS	1.3 km	MPC · JPL
781508	2013 NC_{26}	—	July 15, 2013	Haleakala	Pan-STARRS 1	·	1.3 km	MPC · JPL
781509	2013 NH_{27}	—	September 27, 2009	Mount Lemmon	Mount Lemmon Survey	·	1.3 km	MPC · JPL
781510	2013 NO_{27}	—	July 13, 2013	Mount Lemmon	Mount Lemmon Survey	·	930 m	MPC · JPL
781511	2013 NM_{28}	—	March 27, 2008	Kitt Peak	Spacewatch	·	1.0 km	MPC · JPL
781512	2013 NB_{29}	—	July 12, 2013	Haleakala	Pan-STARRS 1	·	1.3 km	MPC · JPL
781513	2013 NB_{30}	—	January 13, 2011	Mount Lemmon	Mount Lemmon Survey	·	1.4 km	MPC · JPL
781514	2013 ND_{31}	—	July 14, 2013	Haleakala	Pan-STARRS 1	·	1.6 km	MPC · JPL
781515	2013 NH_{31}	—	March 21, 2012	Mount Lemmon	Mount Lemmon Survey	·	1.3 km	MPC · JPL
781516	2013 NQ_{31}	—	July 15, 2013	Haleakala	Pan-STARRS 1	·	1.4 km	MPC · JPL
781517	2013 NG_{32}	—	July 15, 2013	Haleakala	Pan-STARRS 1	·	1.2 km	MPC · JPL
781518	2013 NJ_{33}	—	July 15, 2013	Haleakala	Pan-STARRS 1	·	1.5 km	MPC · JPL
781519	2013 NH_{34}	—	July 15, 2013	Haleakala	Pan-STARRS 1	·	930 m	MPC · JPL
781520	2013 ND_{36}	—	July 13, 2013	Haleakala	Pan-STARRS 1	·	1.4 km	MPC · JPL
781521	2013 NL_{36}	—	July 1, 2013	Haleakala	Pan-STARRS 1	JUN	850 m	MPC · JPL
781522	2013 NX_{37}	—	July 13, 2013	Haleakala	Pan-STARRS 1	·	2.4 km	MPC · JPL
781523	2013 ND_{42}	—	October 26, 2008	Mount Lemmon	Mount Lemmon Survey	LIX	2.7 km	MPC · JPL
781524	2013 NF_{45}	—	December 6, 2015	Mount Lemmon	Mount Lemmon Survey	·	1.5 km	MPC · JPL
781525	2013 NL_{46}	—	July 10, 2018	Haleakala	Pan-STARRS 1	·	1.4 km	MPC · JPL
781526	2013 NP_{48}	—	July 14, 2013	Haleakala	Pan-STARRS 1	HYG	1.8 km	MPC · JPL
781527	2013 NG_{52}	—	July 14, 2013	Haleakala	Pan-STARRS 1	·	1.3 km	MPC · JPL
781528	2013 NM_{52}	—	July 14, 2013	Haleakala	Pan-STARRS 1	·	1.3 km	MPC · JPL
781529	2013 NN_{52}	—	July 13, 2013	Haleakala	Pan-STARRS 1	·	1.2 km	MPC · JPL
781530	2013 NP_{52}	—	July 14, 2013	Haleakala	Pan-STARRS 1	HOF	1.8 km	MPC · JPL
781531	2013 NR_{53}	—	July 14, 2013	Haleakala	Pan-STARRS 1	·	1.3 km	MPC · JPL
781532	2013 NJ_{54}	—	July 13, 2013	Haleakala	Pan-STARRS 1	·	1.3 km	MPC · JPL
781533	2013 NT_{55}	—	July 15, 2013	Haleakala	Pan-STARRS 1	·	1.9 km	MPC · JPL
781534	2013 NA_{57}	—	May 17, 2012	Mount Lemmon	Mount Lemmon Survey	·	1.4 km	MPC · JPL
781535	2013 NN_{57}	—	July 7, 2013	Kitt Peak	Spacewatch	·	1.6 km	MPC · JPL
781536	2013 NY_{57}	—	July 15, 2013	Haleakala	Pan-STARRS 1	VER	2.1 km	MPC · JPL
781537	2013 ND_{58}	—	July 14, 2013	Haleakala	Pan-STARRS 1	·	1.3 km	MPC · JPL
781538	2013 NN_{58}	—	July 13, 2013	Haleakala	Pan-STARRS 1	·	1.3 km	MPC · JPL
781539	2013 NW_{58}	—	July 14, 2013	Haleakala	Pan-STARRS 1	·	1.1 km	MPC · JPL
781540	2013 NX_{59}	—	July 13, 2013	Haleakala	Pan-STARRS 1	AGN	840 m	MPC · JPL
781541	2013 NY_{59}	—	July 14, 2013	Haleakala	Pan-STARRS 1	·	1.3 km	MPC · JPL
781542	2013 NE_{61}	—	July 15, 2013	Haleakala	Pan-STARRS 1	EOS	1.5 km	MPC · JPL
781543	2013 NH_{61}	—	July 15, 2013	Haleakala	Pan-STARRS 1	·	1.2 km	MPC · JPL
781544	2013 NL_{61}	—	February 8, 2011	Mount Lemmon	Mount Lemmon Survey	HOF	1.9 km	MPC · JPL
781545	2013 NO_{62}	—	July 14, 2013	Haleakala	Pan-STARRS 1	·	1.3 km	MPC · JPL
781546	2013 NC_{63}	—	October 20, 2004	Catalina	CSS	·	1.6 km	MPC · JPL
781547	2013 NC_{67}	—	July 15, 2013	Haleakala	Pan-STARRS 1	·	1.4 km	MPC · JPL
781548	2013 NR_{68}	—	July 14, 2013	Haleakala	Pan-STARRS 1	·	1.9 km	MPC · JPL
781549	2013 NF_{69}	—	July 14, 2013	Haleakala	Pan-STARRS 1	·	1.2 km	MPC · JPL
781550	2013 NH_{70}	—	July 4, 2013	Haleakala	Pan-STARRS 1	·	1.1 km	MPC · JPL
781551	2013 NE_{72}	—	July 13, 2013	Haleakala	Pan-STARRS 1	·	1.2 km	MPC · JPL
781552	2013 NX_{75}	—	July 14, 2013	Haleakala	Pan-STARRS 1	·	1.6 km	MPC · JPL
781553	2013 NO_{76}	—	July 14, 2013	Haleakala	Pan-STARRS 1	BRA	1.1 km	MPC · JPL
781554	2013 NS_{76}	—	July 14, 2013	Haleakala	Pan-STARRS 1	KOR	930 m	MPC · JPL
781555	2013 NA_{77}	—	July 1, 2013	Haleakala	Pan-STARRS 1	AGN	950 m	MPC · JPL
781556	2013 NQ_{77}	—	July 15, 2013	Haleakala	Pan-STARRS 1	·	1.4 km	MPC · JPL
781557	2013 NR_{77}	—	July 14, 2013	Haleakala	Pan-STARRS 1	·	1.3 km	MPC · JPL
781558	2013 NS_{77}	—	July 14, 2013	Haleakala	Pan-STARRS 1	·	1.2 km	MPC · JPL
781559	2013 NW_{77}	—	July 13, 2013	Haleakala	Pan-STARRS 1	·	1.3 km	MPC · JPL
781560	2013 NC_{78}	—	July 13, 2013	Haleakala	Pan-STARRS 1	THM	1.7 km	MPC · JPL
781561	2013 NV_{78}	—	July 13, 2013	Haleakala	Pan-STARRS 1	KOR	940 m	MPC · JPL
781562	2013 NW_{79}	—	July 13, 2013	Haleakala	Pan-STARRS 1	·	1.9 km	MPC · JPL
781563	2013 NQ_{82}	—	July 14, 2013	Haleakala	Pan-STARRS 1	·	1.3 km	MPC · JPL
781564	2013 OB_{1}	—	December 21, 2006	Kitt Peak	Spacewatch	·	1.7 km	MPC · JPL
781565	2013 OS_{5}	—	July 29, 2013	Westfield	International Astronomical Search Collaboration	·	1.1 km	MPC · JPL
781566	2013 OP_{11}	—	August 8, 2002	Anderson Mesa	LONEOS	·	2.3 km	MPC · JPL
781567	2013 ON_{17}	—	July 16, 2013	Piszkéstető	K. Sárneczky, Banyai, E.	·	1.5 km	MPC · JPL
781568	2013 OX_{17}	—	July 16, 2013	Haleakala	Pan-STARRS 1	·	1.4 km	MPC · JPL
781569	2013 PR_{4}	—	March 1, 2008	Kitt Peak	Spacewatch	·	1.2 km	MPC · JPL
781570	2013 PZ_{5}	—	July 13, 2013	Haleakala	Pan-STARRS 1	·	1.8 km	MPC · JPL
781571	2013 PU_{14}	—	July 15, 2013	Haleakala	Pan-STARRS 1	·	1.3 km	MPC · JPL
781572	2013 PR_{29}	—	August 9, 2013	Haleakala	Pan-STARRS 1	·	1.8 km	MPC · JPL
781573	2013 PL_{30}	—	August 9, 2013	Haleakala	Pan-STARRS 1	·	1.2 km	MPC · JPL
781574	2013 PU_{30}	—	August 9, 2013	Haleakala	Pan-STARRS 1	·	950 m	MPC · JPL
781575	2013 PK_{33}	—	August 7, 2013	Kitt Peak	Spacewatch	·	1.4 km	MPC · JPL
781576	2013 PP_{36}	—	August 10, 2013	Kitt Peak	Spacewatch	·	1.4 km	MPC · JPL
781577	2013 PW_{39}	—	August 4, 2013	Haleakala	Pan-STARRS 1	·	1.1 km	MPC · JPL
781578	2013 PG_{46}	—	July 15, 2013	Haleakala	Pan-STARRS 1	·	1.5 km	MPC · JPL
781579	2013 PK_{47}	—	February 25, 2011	Mount Lemmon	Mount Lemmon Survey	KOR	1.0 km	MPC · JPL
781580	2013 PV_{47}	—	August 12, 2013	Kitt Peak	Spacewatch	·	1.6 km	MPC · JPL
781581	2013 PO_{53}	—	August 14, 2013	Haleakala	Pan-STARRS 1	·	1.5 km	MPC · JPL
781582	2013 PX_{54}	—	August 9, 2013	Haleakala	Pan-STARRS 1	·	1.9 km	MPC · JPL
781583	2013 PD_{55}	—	August 9, 2013	Haleakala	Pan-STARRS 1	WIT	610 m	MPC · JPL
781584	2013 PD_{56}	—	August 14, 2013	Haleakala	Pan-STARRS 1	·	1.2 km	MPC · JPL
781585	2013 PO_{58}	—	July 16, 2013	Haleakala	Pan-STARRS 1	ADE	1.5 km	MPC · JPL
781586	2013 PU_{62}	—	August 15, 2013	Haleakala	Pan-STARRS 1	·	1.6 km	MPC · JPL
781587	2013 PM_{63}	—	August 8, 2013	Haleakala	Pan-STARRS 1	·	1.3 km	MPC · JPL
781588	2013 PU_{64}	—	July 13, 2013	Mount Lemmon	Mount Lemmon Survey	·	1.4 km	MPC · JPL
781589	2013 PL_{66}	—	August 15, 2013	Haleakala	Pan-STARRS 1	TIR	2.1 km	MPC · JPL
781590	2013 PE_{74}	—	August 12, 2013	Palomar	Palomar Transient Factory	·	1.7 km	MPC · JPL
781591	2013 PF_{76}	—	September 22, 2008	Kitt Peak	Spacewatch	·	2.1 km	MPC · JPL
781592	2013 PJ_{77}	—	February 8, 2011	Mount Lemmon	Mount Lemmon Survey	·	1.6 km	MPC · JPL
781593	2013 PR_{78}	—	August 12, 2013	Haleakala	Pan-STARRS 1	·	1.1 km	MPC · JPL
781594	2013 PL_{79}	—	August 5, 2013	ESA OGS	ESA OGS	·	1.2 km	MPC · JPL
781595	2013 PQ_{79}	—	August 7, 2013	Kitt Peak	Spacewatch	·	1.5 km	MPC · JPL
781596	2013 PF_{81}	—	January 30, 2011	Haleakala	Pan-STARRS 1	KOR	1.1 km	MPC · JPL
781597	2013 PA_{82}	—	August 14, 2013	Haleakala	Pan-STARRS 1	·	1.5 km	MPC · JPL
781598	2013 PM_{82}	—	August 15, 2013	Haleakala	Pan-STARRS 1	AGN	860 m	MPC · JPL
781599	2013 PN_{82}	—	August 15, 2013	Haleakala	Pan-STARRS 1	·	1.4 km	MPC · JPL
781600	2013 PX_{82}	—	August 15, 2013	Haleakala	Pan-STARRS 1	·	1.7 km	MPC · JPL

== 781601–781700 ==
back to top

Designation			Discovery			Properties		Ref
Permanent	Provisional	Named after	Date	Site	Discoverer(s)	Category	Diam.	Ref
781601	2013 PG_{91}	—	November 22, 2014	Haleakala	Pan-STARRS 1	EOS	1.2 km	MPC · JPL
781602	2013 PQ_{91}	—	August 9, 2013	Kitt Peak	Spacewatch	·	830 m	MPC · JPL
781603	2013 PH_{96}	—	February 12, 2016	Mount Lemmon	Mount Lemmon Survey	·	1.2 km	MPC · JPL
781604	2013 PS_{96}	—	January 12, 2016	Kitt Peak	Spacewatch	·	1.9 km	MPC · JPL
781605	2013 PN_{97}	—	August 9, 2013	Kitt Peak	Spacewatch	·	1.3 km	MPC · JPL
781606	2013 PO_{98}	—	August 12, 2013	Haleakala	Pan-STARRS 1	·	1.8 km	MPC · JPL
781607	2013 PH_{99}	—	August 8, 2013	Haleakala	Pan-STARRS 1	·	1.4 km	MPC · JPL
781608	2013 PN_{99}	—	August 15, 2013	Haleakala	Pan-STARRS 1	·	2.0 km	MPC · JPL
781609	2013 PS_{99}	—	August 12, 2013	Haleakala	Pan-STARRS 1	·	1.2 km	MPC · JPL
781610	2013 PT_{99}	—	August 9, 2013	Kitt Peak	Spacewatch	·	1.3 km	MPC · JPL
781611	2013 PL_{100}	—	August 15, 2013	Haleakala	Pan-STARRS 1	·	1.3 km	MPC · JPL
781612	2013 PY_{100}	—	August 15, 2013	Haleakala	Pan-STARRS 1	·	2.1 km	MPC · JPL
781613	2013 PC_{101}	—	August 3, 2013	Haleakala	Pan-STARRS 1	·	1.8 km	MPC · JPL
781614	2013 PH_{102}	—	August 7, 2013	Kitt Peak	Spacewatch	·	1.8 km	MPC · JPL
781615	2013 PT_{102}	—	August 12, 2013	Haleakala	Pan-STARRS 1	·	1.4 km	MPC · JPL
781616	2013 PV_{105}	—	September 16, 2009	Catalina	CSS	(5)	1.0 km	MPC · JPL
781617	2013 PO_{106}	—	August 15, 2013	Haleakala	Pan-STARRS 1	·	1.5 km	MPC · JPL
781618	2013 PG_{110}	—	August 15, 2013	Haleakala	Pan-STARRS 1	·	1.3 km	MPC · JPL
781619	2013 PY_{112}	—	August 15, 2013	Haleakala	Pan-STARRS 1	·	1.6 km	MPC · JPL
781620	2013 PJ_{114}	—	August 15, 2013	Haleakala	Pan-STARRS 1	·	1.6 km	MPC · JPL
781621	2013 PP_{115}	—	August 14, 2013	Haleakala	Pan-STARRS 1	·	1.5 km	MPC · JPL
781622	2013 PT_{115}	—	October 8, 2008	Mount Lemmon	Mount Lemmon Survey	·	1.8 km	MPC · JPL
781623	2013 PB_{116}	—	August 12, 2013	Haleakala	Pan-STARRS 1	EOS	1.2 km	MPC · JPL
781624	2013 PZ_{116}	—	August 12, 2013	Haleakala	Pan-STARRS 1	·	1.2 km	MPC · JPL
781625	2013 PA_{117}	—	August 12, 2013	Haleakala	Pan-STARRS 1	EOS	1.0 km	MPC · JPL
781626	2013 PM_{117}	—	August 15, 2013	Haleakala	Pan-STARRS 1	·	1.1 km	MPC · JPL
781627	2013 PJ_{119}	—	August 15, 2013	Haleakala	Pan-STARRS 1	·	1.5 km	MPC · JPL
781628	2013 PA_{121}	—	August 9, 2013	Kitt Peak	Spacewatch	3:2 · SHU	3.8 km	MPC · JPL
781629	2013 PK_{121}	—	August 12, 2013	Kitt Peak	Spacewatch	3:2 · SHU	3.6 km	MPC · JPL
781630	2013 PV_{122}	—	August 15, 2013	Haleakala	Pan-STARRS 1	·	1.4 km	MPC · JPL
781631	2013 PW_{122}	—	August 14, 2013	Haleakala	Pan-STARRS 1	·	1.3 km	MPC · JPL
781632	2013 PP_{123}	—	August 14, 2013	Haleakala	Pan-STARRS 1	KOR	1.1 km	MPC · JPL
781633	2013 PH_{126}	—	August 14, 2013	Haleakala	Pan-STARRS 1	·	2.0 km	MPC · JPL
781634	2013 PU_{126}	—	January 2, 2011	Mount Lemmon	Mount Lemmon Survey	·	1.3 km	MPC · JPL
781635	2013 PE_{128}	—	August 15, 2013	Haleakala	Pan-STARRS 1	·	1.3 km	MPC · JPL
781636	2013 PK_{128}	—	August 15, 2013	Haleakala	Pan-STARRS 1	MRX	730 m	MPC · JPL
781637	2013 PM_{128}	—	August 4, 2013	Haleakala	Pan-STARRS 1	·	1.2 km	MPC · JPL
781638	2013 PZ_{128}	—	August 14, 2013	Haleakala	Pan-STARRS 1	·	1.3 km	MPC · JPL
781639	2013 PE_{133}	—	August 15, 2013	Haleakala	Pan-STARRS 1	·	1.4 km	MPC · JPL
781640	2013 PJ_{134}	—	August 4, 2013	Haleakala	Pan-STARRS 1	·	1.3 km	MPC · JPL
781641	2013 PN_{134}	—	August 2, 2013	Haleakala	Pan-STARRS 1	·	1.1 km	MPC · JPL
781642	2013 PQ_{134}	—	August 8, 2013	Haleakala	Pan-STARRS 1	·	1.9 km	MPC · JPL
781643	2013 PE_{136}	—	August 12, 2013	Haleakala	Pan-STARRS 1	·	1.2 km	MPC · JPL
781644	2013 PD_{137}	—	August 15, 2013	Haleakala	Pan-STARRS 1	·	1.5 km	MPC · JPL
781645	2013 PT_{137}	—	August 9, 2013	Kitt Peak	Spacewatch	KOR	1.1 km	MPC · JPL
781646	2013 PD_{138}	—	August 9, 2013	Kitt Peak	Spacewatch	·	1.3 km	MPC · JPL
781647	2013 PC_{139}	—	August 8, 2013	Haleakala	Pan-STARRS 1	·	2.0 km	MPC · JPL
781648	2013 PJ_{139}	—	August 14, 2013	Haleakala	Pan-STARRS 1	AGN	840 m	MPC · JPL
781649	2013 PR_{139}	—	August 15, 2013	Haleakala	Pan-STARRS 1	AGN	710 m	MPC · JPL
781650	2013 PZ_{139}	—	August 9, 2013	Haleakala	Pan-STARRS 1	·	1.1 km	MPC · JPL
781651	2013 PW_{144}	—	August 9, 2013	Haleakala	Pan-STARRS 1	·	1.8 km	MPC · JPL
781652	2013 QA_{2}	—	August 16, 2013	Cerro Tololo	Lister, T.	·	1.1 km	MPC · JPL
781653	2013 QG_{3}	—	August 17, 2013	Haleakala	Pan-STARRS 1	AEO	900 m	MPC · JPL
781654	2013 QC_{9}	—	February 7, 2011	Mount Lemmon	Mount Lemmon Survey	AGN	840 m	MPC · JPL
781655	2013 QA_{13}	—	August 15, 2013	Haleakala	Pan-STARRS 1	·	1.3 km	MPC · JPL
781656	2013 QY_{20}	—	August 9, 2013	Kitt Peak	Spacewatch	·	1.4 km	MPC · JPL
781657	2013 QK_{27}	—	March 22, 2001	Kitt Peak	SKADS	·	1.5 km	MPC · JPL
781658	2013 QS_{31}	—	August 15, 2013	Haleakala	Pan-STARRS 1	·	1.4 km	MPC · JPL
781659	2013 QO_{34}	—	August 30, 2013	Haleakala	Pan-STARRS 1	ELF	2.5 km	MPC · JPL
781660	2013 QU_{35}	—	August 31, 2013	Haleakala	Pan-STARRS 1	KOR	980 m	MPC · JPL
781661	2013 QE_{37}	—	August 26, 2013	Haleakala	Pan-STARRS 1	·	1.4 km	MPC · JPL
781662	2013 QM_{38}	—	September 27, 2009	Kitt Peak	Spacewatch	·	1.1 km	MPC · JPL
781663	2013 QZ_{40}	—	August 28, 2013	Mount Lemmon	Mount Lemmon Survey	VER	2.1 km	MPC · JPL
781664	2013 QE_{43}	—	August 9, 2013	Kitt Peak	Spacewatch	·	1.5 km	MPC · JPL
781665	2013 QE_{44}	—	August 19, 2001	Cerro Tololo	Deep Ecliptic Survey	·	2.6 km	MPC · JPL
781666	2013 QM_{49}	—	August 31, 2013	Haleakala	Pan-STARRS 1	·	1.1 km	MPC · JPL
781667	2013 QX_{49}	—	August 15, 2013	Haleakala	Pan-STARRS 1	WIT	710 m	MPC · JPL
781668	2013 QT_{63}	—	August 27, 2013	Haleakala	Pan-STARRS 1	·	1.5 km	MPC · JPL
781669	2013 QE_{67}	—	October 8, 2008	Mount Lemmon	Mount Lemmon Survey	HYG	2.0 km	MPC · JPL
781670	2013 QL_{67}	—	August 18, 2009	Kitt Peak	Spacewatch	·	1.2 km	MPC · JPL
781671	2013 QJ_{70}	—	August 30, 2013	Haleakala	Pan-STARRS 1	TIR	2.3 km	MPC · JPL
781672	2013 QQ_{86}	—	August 26, 2013	Haleakala	Pan-STARRS 1	AGN	860 m	MPC · JPL
781673	2013 QP_{87}	—	August 26, 2013	Haleakala	Pan-STARRS 1	·	1.4 km	MPC · JPL
781674	2013 QA_{88}	—	August 9, 2013	Haleakala	Pan-STARRS 1	AGN	900 m	MPC · JPL
781675	2013 QS_{92}	—	November 8, 2009	Mount Lemmon	Mount Lemmon Survey	·	1.1 km	MPC · JPL
781676	2013 QU_{92}	—	July 28, 2013	Kitt Peak	Spacewatch	·	2.2 km	MPC · JPL
781677	2013 QJ_{93}	—	August 12, 2013	Haleakala	Pan-STARRS 1	VER	1.9 km	MPC · JPL
781678	2013 QY_{93}	—	August 12, 2013	Haleakala	Pan-STARRS 1	·	1.6 km	MPC · JPL
781679	2013 QK_{94}	—	August 29, 2013	Haleakala	Pan-STARRS 1	·	1.3 km	MPC · JPL
781680	2013 QQ_{94}	—	September 6, 2008	Kitt Peak	Spacewatch	·	1.9 km	MPC · JPL
781681	2013 QY_{99}	—	August 31, 2013	Haleakala	Pan-STARRS 1	·	1.8 km	MPC · JPL
781682	2013 QC_{100}	—	August 29, 2013	Haleakala	Pan-STARRS 1	BRA	1.0 km	MPC · JPL
781683	2013 QY_{101}	—	August 26, 2013	Haleakala	Pan-STARRS 1	·	1.3 km	MPC · JPL
781684	2013 QP_{102}	—	August 28, 2013	Mount Lemmon	Mount Lemmon Survey	·	1.2 km	MPC · JPL
781685	2013 QX_{102}	—	August 29, 2013	Haleakala	Pan-STARRS 1	EUN	860 m	MPC · JPL
781686	2013 QK_{103}	—	August 28, 2013	Mount Lemmon	Mount Lemmon Survey	EOS	1.1 km	MPC · JPL
781687	2013 QY_{104}	—	August 16, 2013	Haleakala	Pan-STARRS 1	·	1.4 km	MPC · JPL
781688	2013 QC_{107}	—	August 28, 2013	Mount Lemmon	Mount Lemmon Survey	BRA	1.0 km	MPC · JPL
781689	2013 RS_{2}	—	March 15, 2012	Haleakala	Pan-STARRS 1	EUN	1.2 km	MPC · JPL
781690	2013 RA_{3}	—	September 1, 2013	Mount Lemmon	Mount Lemmon Survey	·	2.3 km	MPC · JPL
781691	2013 RA_{5}	—	September 2, 2013	Mount Lemmon	Mount Lemmon Survey	·	1.2 km	MPC · JPL
781692	2013 RV_{6}	—	August 12, 2013	Haleakala	Pan-STARRS 1	·	1.5 km	MPC · JPL
781693	2013 RK_{7}	—	September 2, 2013	Mount Lemmon	Mount Lemmon Survey	·	1.4 km	MPC · JPL
781694	2013 RN_{8}	—	August 15, 2013	Haleakala	Pan-STARRS 1	AGN	850 m	MPC · JPL
781695	2013 RJ_{11}	—	September 1, 2013	Haleakala	Pan-STARRS 1	KOR	930 m	MPC · JPL
781696	2013 RT_{14}	—	April 20, 2012	Kitt Peak	Spacewatch	·	1.3 km	MPC · JPL
781697	2013 RD_{17}	—	August 14, 2013	Haleakala	Pan-STARRS 1	·	1.3 km	MPC · JPL
781698	2013 RW_{26}	—	September 4, 2013	Calar Alto	F. Hormuth	·	2.8 km	MPC · JPL
781699	2013 RR_{34}	—	October 27, 2009	Kitt Peak	Spacewatch	·	1.3 km	MPC · JPL
781700	2013 RV_{36}	—	September 16, 2003	Kitt Peak	Spacewatch	KOR	1.0 km	MPC · JPL

== 781701–781800 ==
back to top

Designation			Discovery			Properties		Ref
Permanent	Provisional	Named after	Date	Site	Discoverer(s)	Category	Diam.	Ref
781701	2013 RQ_{39}	—	September 3, 2013	Mount Lemmon	Mount Lemmon Survey	·	1.5 km	MPC · JPL
781702	2013 RE_{42}	—	September 8, 2013	Elena Remote	Oreshko, A.	·	1.8 km	MPC · JPL
781703	2013 RG_{45}	—	September 21, 2008	Mount Lemmon	Mount Lemmon Survey	·	1.9 km	MPC · JPL
781704	2013 RC_{48}	—	September 10, 2013	Haleakala	Pan-STARRS 1	·	1.2 km	MPC · JPL
781705	2013 RY_{49}	—	September 10, 2013	Haleakala	Pan-STARRS 1	·	1.3 km	MPC · JPL
781706	2013 RS_{63}	—	September 1, 2013	Mount Lemmon	Mount Lemmon Survey	·	1.4 km	MPC · JPL
781707	2013 RW_{64}	—	September 12, 2013	Palomar	Palomar Transient Factory	MRX	970 m	MPC · JPL
781708	2013 RX_{65}	—	September 12, 2004	Kitt Peak	Spacewatch	·	1.4 km	MPC · JPL
781709	2013 RW_{66}	—	November 19, 2009	Mount Lemmon	Mount Lemmon Survey	·	1.4 km	MPC · JPL
781710	2013 RC_{68}	—	September 11, 2013	Palomar	Palomar Transient Factory	·	1.5 km	MPC · JPL
781711	2013 RU_{68}	—	July 30, 2013	Kitt Peak	Spacewatch	·	1.6 km	MPC · JPL
781712	2013 RP_{69}	—	September 1, 2013	Mount Lemmon	Mount Lemmon Survey	·	1.5 km	MPC · JPL
781713	2013 RR_{69}	—	September 1, 2013	Mount Lemmon	Mount Lemmon Survey	AGN	820 m	MPC · JPL
781714	2013 RU_{76}	—	September 3, 2013	Haleakala	Pan-STARRS 1	THM	1.7 km	MPC · JPL
781715	2013 RB_{79}	—	August 8, 2013	Kitt Peak	Spacewatch	·	1.4 km	MPC · JPL
781716	2013 RG_{99}	—	September 1, 2013	Mount Lemmon	Mount Lemmon Survey	·	1.1 km	MPC · JPL
781717	2013 RM_{99}	—	September 2, 2013	Mount Lemmon	Mount Lemmon Survey	·	1.6 km	MPC · JPL
781718	2013 RV_{99}	—	September 22, 2003	Kitt Peak	Spacewatch	·	1.5 km	MPC · JPL
781719	2013 RW_{100}	—	September 3, 2013	Haleakala	Pan-STARRS 1	DOR	1.7 km	MPC · JPL
781720	2013 RY_{103}	—	October 8, 2008	Kitt Peak	Spacewatch	·	1.8 km	MPC · JPL
781721	2013 RK_{105}	—	September 6, 2013	Mount Lemmon	Mount Lemmon Survey	EOS	1.4 km	MPC · JPL
781722	2013 RL_{105}	—	September 6, 2013	Mount Lemmon	Mount Lemmon Survey	·	2.6 km	MPC · JPL
781723	2013 RN_{105}	—	October 27, 2008	Mount Lemmon	Mount Lemmon Survey	·	1.9 km	MPC · JPL
781724	2013 RQ_{107}	—	September 15, 2013	Haleakala	Pan-STARRS 1	·	1.7 km	MPC · JPL
781725	2013 RD_{120}	—	November 26, 2014	Haleakala	Pan-STARRS 1	·	2.2 km	MPC · JPL
781726	2013 RR_{120}	—	September 13, 2013	Mount Lemmon	Mount Lemmon Survey	·	2.0 km	MPC · JPL
781727	2013 RQ_{122}	—	September 9, 2013	Haleakala	Pan-STARRS 1	·	1.5 km	MPC · JPL
781728	2013 RA_{126}	—	September 14, 2013	Haleakala	Pan-STARRS 1	ELF	2.4 km	MPC · JPL
781729	2013 RB_{126}	—	November 27, 2014	Haleakala	Pan-STARRS 1	VER	2.1 km	MPC · JPL
781730	2013 RS_{126}	—	September 13, 2013	Kitt Peak	Spacewatch	·	1.3 km	MPC · JPL
781731	2013 RF_{129}	—	September 13, 2013	Kitt Peak	Spacewatch	·	1.7 km	MPC · JPL
781732	2013 RP_{129}	—	September 13, 2013	Mount Lemmon	Mount Lemmon Survey	·	2.4 km	MPC · JPL
781733	2013 RH_{131}	—	September 6, 2013	Mount Lemmon	Mount Lemmon Survey	·	1.6 km	MPC · JPL
781734	2013 RZ_{131}	—	September 12, 2013	Mount Lemmon	Mount Lemmon Survey	·	1.2 km	MPC · JPL
781735	2013 RP_{134}	—	February 8, 2011	Mount Lemmon	Mount Lemmon Survey	·	1.5 km	MPC · JPL
781736	2013 RX_{136}	—	September 10, 2013	Haleakala	Pan-STARRS 1	·	1.9 km	MPC · JPL
781737	2013 RF_{137}	—	September 6, 2013	Mount Lemmon	Mount Lemmon Survey	·	1.7 km	MPC · JPL
781738	2013 RS_{138}	—	September 3, 2013	Haleakala	Pan-STARRS 1	AGN	840 m	MPC · JPL
781739	2013 RZ_{141}	—	September 1, 2013	Haleakala	Pan-STARRS 1	·	1.5 km	MPC · JPL
781740	2013 RJ_{142}	—	September 1, 2013	Mount Lemmon	Mount Lemmon Survey	·	1.4 km	MPC · JPL
781741	2013 RE_{151}	—	September 3, 2013	Haleakala	Pan-STARRS 1	KOR	1.0 km	MPC · JPL
781742	2013 RH_{151}	—	September 10, 2013	Haleakala	Pan-STARRS 1	·	1.3 km	MPC · JPL
781743	2013 RK_{151}	—	September 3, 2013	Mount Lemmon	Mount Lemmon Survey	EOS	1.4 km	MPC · JPL
781744	2013 RR_{151}	—	September 1, 2013	Mount Lemmon	Mount Lemmon Survey	AGN	780 m	MPC · JPL
781745	2013 RV_{152}	—	September 3, 2013	Haleakala	Pan-STARRS 1	·	600 m	MPC · JPL
781746	2013 RA_{153}	—	September 10, 2013	Haleakala	Pan-STARRS 1	·	1.5 km	MPC · JPL
781747	2013 RO_{154}	—	September 3, 2013	Mount Lemmon	Mount Lemmon Survey	·	1.9 km	MPC · JPL
781748	2013 RP_{154}	—	September 14, 2013	Haleakala	Pan-STARRS 1	·	1.5 km	MPC · JPL
781749	2013 RH_{158}	—	September 14, 2013	Mount Lemmon	Mount Lemmon Survey	L5	6.3 km	MPC · JPL
781750	2013 RF_{159}	—	September 1, 2013	Mount Lemmon	Mount Lemmon Survey	KOR	1.1 km	MPC · JPL
781751	2013 RG_{159}	—	September 3, 2013	Mount Lemmon	Mount Lemmon Survey	KOR	950 m	MPC · JPL
781752	2013 RZ_{160}	—	September 2, 2013	Mount Lemmon	Mount Lemmon Survey	L5	7.0 km	MPC · JPL
781753 Scurtu	2013 RV_{162}	Scurtu	September 8, 2013	La Palma	EURONEAR	·	2.6 km	MPC · JPL
781754	2013 RU_{163}	—	September 9, 2013	Haleakala	Pan-STARRS 1	·	1.4 km	MPC · JPL
781755	2013 RE_{164}	—	September 1, 2013	Haleakala	Pan-STARRS 1	EOS	1.4 km	MPC · JPL
781756	2013 RK_{164}	—	September 2, 2013	Mount Lemmon	Mount Lemmon Survey	·	1.2 km	MPC · JPL
781757	2013 RU_{164}	—	September 1, 2013	Haleakala	Pan-STARRS 1	·	1.8 km	MPC · JPL
781758	2013 RK_{165}	—	September 1, 2013	Mount Lemmon	Mount Lemmon Survey	·	1.5 km	MPC · JPL
781759	2013 RY_{171}	—	September 1, 2013	Mount Lemmon	Mount Lemmon Survey	·	1.2 km	MPC · JPL
781760	2013 RC_{173}	—	September 16, 2009	Kitt Peak	Spacewatch	·	1.0 km	MPC · JPL
781761	2013 RN_{173}	—	September 4, 2013	Mount Lemmon	Mount Lemmon Survey	·	1.2 km	MPC · JPL
781762	2013 RQ_{173}	—	September 14, 2013	Haleakala	Pan-STARRS 1	(260)	3.0 km	MPC · JPL
781763	2013 RT_{173}	—	September 3, 2013	Haleakala	Pan-STARRS 1	EOS	1.3 km	MPC · JPL
781764	2013 RN_{174}	—	September 6, 2013	Mount Lemmon	Mount Lemmon Survey	·	1 km	MPC · JPL
781765	2013 RH_{176}	—	September 14, 2013	Mount Lemmon	Mount Lemmon Survey	·	1.6 km	MPC · JPL
781766	2013 RL_{177}	—	September 6, 2013	Mount Lemmon	Mount Lemmon Survey	·	1.4 km	MPC · JPL
781767	2013 RM_{177}	—	September 14, 2013	Mount Lemmon	Mount Lemmon Survey	·	1.6 km	MPC · JPL
781768	2013 RO_{177}	—	September 13, 2013	Mount Lemmon	Mount Lemmon Survey	·	1.2 km	MPC · JPL
781769	2013 RC_{178}	—	September 1, 2013	Mount Lemmon	Mount Lemmon Survey	·	1.5 km	MPC · JPL
781770	2013 RH_{191}	—	September 13, 2013	Mount Lemmon	Mount Lemmon Survey	·	1.9 km	MPC · JPL
781771	2013 RF_{193}	—	September 3, 2013	Haleakala	Pan-STARRS 1	·	1.5 km	MPC · JPL
781772	2013 RP_{193}	—	September 14, 2013	Haleakala	Pan-STARRS 1	·	1.6 km	MPC · JPL
781773	2013 RS_{193}	—	September 14, 2013	Haleakala	Pan-STARRS 1	·	1.8 km	MPC · JPL
781774	2013 SZ_{30}	—	August 12, 2013	Haleakala	Pan-STARRS 1	·	1.2 km	MPC · JPL
781775	2013 SG_{38}	—	September 25, 2013	Mount Lemmon	Mount Lemmon Survey	·	1.3 km	MPC · JPL
781776	2013 SJ_{45}	—	September 1, 2013	Mount Lemmon	Mount Lemmon Survey	·	1.2 km	MPC · JPL
781777	2013 SO_{45}	—	September 28, 2013	Mount Lemmon	Mount Lemmon Survey	·	1.8 km	MPC · JPL
781778	2013 SD_{46}	—	September 20, 2008	Mount Lemmon	Mount Lemmon Survey	KOR	1.0 km	MPC · JPL
781779	2013 SU_{62}	—	September 2, 2013	Mount Lemmon	Mount Lemmon Survey	·	1.6 km	MPC · JPL
781780	2013 SZ_{62}	—	August 7, 2008	Kitt Peak	Spacewatch	KOR	1.1 km	MPC · JPL
781781	2013 SP_{65}	—	September 13, 2013	Kitt Peak	Spacewatch	·	1.6 km	MPC · JPL
781782	2013 SU_{67}	—	September 24, 2013	Kitt Peak	Spacewatch	KOR	970 m	MPC · JPL
781783	2013 SJ_{68}	—	September 24, 2013	Mount Lemmon	Mount Lemmon Survey	·	1.4 km	MPC · JPL
781784	2013 SN_{71}	—	August 15, 2013	Haleakala	Pan-STARRS 1	HOF	1.9 km	MPC · JPL
781785	2013 SF_{72}	—	September 25, 2013	Mount Lemmon	Mount Lemmon Survey	·	1.3 km	MPC · JPL
781786	2013 SK_{76}	—	September 14, 2013	Haleakala	Pan-STARRS 1	·	2.2 km	MPC · JPL
781787	2013 SY_{79}	—	September 1, 2013	Mount Lemmon	Mount Lemmon Survey	KOR	1.1 km	MPC · JPL
781788	2013 SM_{83}	—	September 30, 2013	Calar Alto-CASADO	Mottola, S., Proffe, G.	·	2.1 km	MPC · JPL
781789	2013 SB_{89}	—	September 3, 2013	Haleakala	Pan-STARRS 1	·	1.3 km	MPC · JPL
781790	2013 SB_{90}	—	September 27, 2008	Mount Lemmon	Mount Lemmon Survey	·	1.9 km	MPC · JPL
781791	2013 SG_{96}	—	September 9, 2013	Haleakala	Pan-STARRS 1	·	1.8 km	MPC · JPL
781792	2013 SP_{97}	—	September 24, 2013	Mount Lemmon	Mount Lemmon Survey	·	1.5 km	MPC · JPL
781793	2013 SJ_{107}	—	December 6, 2008	Kitt Peak	Spacewatch	·	2.9 km	MPC · JPL
781794	2013 SV_{108}	—	September 27, 2013	Piszkés-tető	K. Sárneczky, T. Csörgei	·	1.2 km	MPC · JPL
781795	2013 SR_{110}	—	September 26, 2013	Mount Lemmon	Mount Lemmon Survey	L5	7.3 km	MPC · JPL
781796	2013 SU_{110}	—	September 25, 2013	Mount Lemmon	Mount Lemmon Survey	EOS	1.3 km	MPC · JPL
781797	2013 SC_{111}	—	September 24, 2013	Mount Lemmon	Mount Lemmon Survey	·	1.3 km	MPC · JPL
781798	2013 SO_{111}	—	September 2, 2013	Mount Lemmon	Mount Lemmon Survey	EOS	1.2 km	MPC · JPL
781799	2013 SD_{114}	—	September 24, 2013	Mount Lemmon	Mount Lemmon Survey	EOS	1.3 km	MPC · JPL
781800	2013 SV_{114}	—	September 23, 2013	Catalina	CSS	·	1.7 km	MPC · JPL

== 781801–781900 ==
back to top

Designation			Discovery			Properties		Ref
Permanent	Provisional	Named after	Date	Site	Discoverer(s)	Category	Diam.	Ref
781801	2013 SX_{114}	—	January 30, 2006	Kitt Peak	Spacewatch	·	1.4 km	MPC · JPL
781802	2013 SF_{119}	—	September 23, 2013	Mount Lemmon	Mount Lemmon Survey	·	1.6 km	MPC · JPL
781803	2013 TZ	—	October 1, 2013	Elena Remote	Oreshko, A.	LIX	2.6 km	MPC · JPL
781804	2013 TM_{15}	—	October 1, 2013	Mount Lemmon	Mount Lemmon Survey	AST	1.1 km	MPC · JPL
781805	2013 TP_{15}	—	March 2, 2006	Kitt Peak	Spacewatch	KOR	1.1 km	MPC · JPL
781806	2013 TT_{15}	—	September 30, 2013	Mount Lemmon	Mount Lemmon Survey	·	1.3 km	MPC · JPL
781807	2013 TO_{16}	—	February 25, 2011	Mount Lemmon	Mount Lemmon Survey	·	1.3 km	MPC · JPL
781808	2013 TJ_{19}	—	October 1, 2013	Mount Lemmon	Mount Lemmon Survey	·	1.3 km	MPC · JPL
781809	2013 TR_{22}	—	October 1, 2013	Mount Lemmon	Mount Lemmon Survey	KOR	980 m	MPC · JPL
781810	2013 TB_{23}	—	October 1, 2013	Mount Lemmon	Mount Lemmon Survey	KOR	990 m	MPC · JPL
781811	2013 TE_{27}	—	September 15, 2013	Mount Lemmon	Mount Lemmon Survey	KOR	980 m	MPC · JPL
781812	2013 TD_{50}	—	October 2, 2013	Mount Lemmon	Mount Lemmon Survey	·	1.6 km	MPC · JPL
781813	2013 TS_{51}	—	October 4, 2013	Mount Lemmon	Mount Lemmon Survey	·	1.5 km	MPC · JPL
781814	2013 TB_{53}	—	October 4, 2013	Kitt Peak	Spacewatch	·	1.7 km	MPC · JPL
781815	2013 TQ_{59}	—	October 4, 2013	Mount Lemmon	Mount Lemmon Survey	·	2.0 km	MPC · JPL
781816	2013 TW_{62}	—	September 7, 2008	Mount Lemmon	Mount Lemmon Survey	·	1.5 km	MPC · JPL
781817	2013 TQ_{64}	—	October 4, 2013	Mount Lemmon	Mount Lemmon Survey	·	1.6 km	MPC · JPL
781818	2013 TY_{64}	—	October 4, 2013	Mount Lemmon	Mount Lemmon Survey	·	1.4 km	MPC · JPL
781819	2013 TH_{72}	—	October 2, 2013	Haleakala	Pan-STARRS 1	·	1.5 km	MPC · JPL
781820	2013 TH_{74}	—	September 18, 2007	Kitt Peak	Spacewatch	·	2.5 km	MPC · JPL
781821	2013 TQ_{82}	—	October 1, 2013	Kitt Peak	Spacewatch	·	1.4 km	MPC · JPL
781822	2013 TR_{82}	—	October 1, 2013	Kitt Peak	Spacewatch	LIX	2.6 km	MPC · JPL
781823	2013 TU_{85}	—	March 14, 2011	Mount Lemmon	Mount Lemmon Survey	KOR	1 km	MPC · JPL
781824	2013 TP_{87}	—	October 1, 2013	Mount Lemmon	Mount Lemmon Survey	·	1.4 km	MPC · JPL
781825	2013 TQ_{87}	—	December 22, 2008	Kitt Peak	Spacewatch	THM	1.5 km	MPC · JPL
781826	2013 TA_{90}	—	September 14, 2013	Mount Lemmon	Mount Lemmon Survey	·	1.2 km	MPC · JPL
781827	2013 TD_{91}	—	September 15, 2013	Mount Lemmon	Mount Lemmon Survey	·	1.3 km	MPC · JPL
781828	2013 TJ_{91}	—	October 1, 2013	Mount Lemmon	Mount Lemmon Survey	GEF	870 m	MPC · JPL
781829	2013 TK_{102}	—	October 2, 2013	Mount Lemmon	Mount Lemmon Survey	·	700 m	MPC · JPL
781830	2013 TN_{112}	—	October 20, 2008	Kitt Peak	Spacewatch	·	1.1 km	MPC · JPL
781831	2013 TC_{118}	—	October 4, 2013	Mount Lemmon	Mount Lemmon Survey	·	1.4 km	MPC · JPL
781832	2013 TB_{131}	—	October 8, 2013	Cala d'Hort	B. Linero, I. de la Cueva	EOS	1.5 km	MPC · JPL
781833	2013 TP_{137}	—	October 2, 2013	Haleakala	Pan-STARRS 1	·	1.3 km	MPC · JPL
781834	2013 TK_{142}	—	October 2, 2013	Haleakala	Pan-STARRS 1	THM	1.8 km	MPC · JPL
781835	2013 TP_{145}	—	October 8, 2013	La Silla	D. L. Rabinowitz	centaur	80 km	MPC · JPL
781836	2013 TR_{145}	—	September 20, 2000	Haleakala	NEAT	·	1.2 km	MPC · JPL
781837	2013 TH_{148}	—	May 28, 2008	Kitt Peak	Spacewatch	·	1.0 km	MPC · JPL
781838	2013 TS_{159}	—	October 2, 2013	Haleakala	Pan-STARRS 1	L5	6.9 km	MPC · JPL
781839	2013 TZ_{160}	—	October 5, 2013	Kitt Peak	Spacewatch	THM	2.0 km	MPC · JPL
781840	2013 TG_{161}	—	October 31, 2008	Kitt Peak	Spacewatch	·	1.6 km	MPC · JPL
781841	2013 TG_{162}	—	November 6, 2008	Mount Lemmon	Mount Lemmon Survey	·	1.5 km	MPC · JPL
781842	2013 TA_{163}	—	October 12, 2013	Kitt Peak	Spacewatch	·	2.5 km	MPC · JPL
781843	2013 TM_{163}	—	October 3, 2013	Haleakala	Pan-STARRS 1	·	2.1 km	MPC · JPL
781844	2013 TQ_{164}	—	May 27, 2012	Mount Lemmon	Mount Lemmon Survey	EUN	950 m	MPC · JPL
781845	2013 TA_{165}	—	October 3, 2013	Haleakala	Pan-STARRS 1	·	2.8 km	MPC · JPL
781846	2013 TL_{166}	—	April 13, 2012	Mount Lemmon	Mount Lemmon Survey	EUN	1.0 km	MPC · JPL
781847	2013 TP_{168}	—	October 3, 2013	Mount Lemmon	Mount Lemmon Survey	·	1.7 km	MPC · JPL
781848	2013 TC_{179}	—	October 9, 2013	Mount Lemmon	Mount Lemmon Survey	·	2.4 km	MPC · JPL
781849	2013 TL_{179}	—	October 14, 2013	Mount Lemmon	Mount Lemmon Survey	T_{j} (2.99)	2.7 km	MPC · JPL
781850	2013 TA_{182}	—	April 27, 2017	Haleakala	Pan-STARRS 1	·	2.2 km	MPC · JPL
781851	2013 TT_{184}	—	October 14, 2013	Mount Lemmon	Mount Lemmon Survey	·	2.4 km	MPC · JPL
781852	2013 TO_{185}	—	October 6, 2013	Kitt Peak	Spacewatch	·	2.0 km	MPC · JPL
781853	2013 TF_{186}	—	October 15, 2013	Mount Lemmon	Mount Lemmon Survey	·	1.5 km	MPC · JPL
781854	2013 TK_{189}	—	January 17, 2016	Haleakala	Pan-STARRS 1	VER	2.2 km	MPC · JPL
781855	2013 TM_{189}	—	October 5, 2013	Haleakala	Pan-STARRS 1	·	1.9 km	MPC · JPL
781856	2013 TN_{189}	—	October 3, 2013	Haleakala	Pan-STARRS 1	·	2.1 km	MPC · JPL
781857	2013 TZ_{190}	—	October 5, 2013	Haleakala	Pan-STARRS 1	·	2.1 km	MPC · JPL
781858	2013 TH_{191}	—	October 9, 2013	Kitt Peak	Spacewatch	·	1.3 km	MPC · JPL
781859	2013 TA_{192}	—	October 1, 2013	Mount Lemmon	Mount Lemmon Survey	·	2.0 km	MPC · JPL
781860	2013 TR_{195}	—	October 2, 2013	Haleakala	Pan-STARRS 1	EOS	1.4 km	MPC · JPL
781861	2013 TU_{195}	—	October 2, 2013	Mount Lemmon	Mount Lemmon Survey	URS	2.2 km	MPC · JPL
781862	2013 TG_{196}	—	October 2, 2013	Mount Lemmon	Mount Lemmon Survey	AGN	840 m	MPC · JPL
781863	2013 TW_{196}	—	October 5, 2013	Haleakala	Pan-STARRS 1	·	2.0 km	MPC · JPL
781864	2013 TY_{196}	—	October 9, 2013	Mount Lemmon	Mount Lemmon Survey	·	2.2 km	MPC · JPL
781865	2013 TA_{197}	—	October 8, 2013	Kitt Peak	Spacewatch	·	2.5 km	MPC · JPL
781866	2013 TM_{197}	—	October 3, 2013	Mount Lemmon	Mount Lemmon Survey	·	2.1 km	MPC · JPL
781867	2013 TO_{197}	—	October 13, 2013	Mount Lemmon	Mount Lemmon Survey	·	2.3 km	MPC · JPL
781868	2013 TG_{198}	—	October 3, 2013	Kitt Peak	Spacewatch	THM	1.6 km	MPC · JPL
781869	2013 TQ_{199}	—	October 13, 2013	Kitt Peak	Spacewatch	·	1.2 km	MPC · JPL
781870	2013 TL_{200}	—	October 6, 2013	Kitt Peak	Spacewatch	·	1.5 km	MPC · JPL
781871	2013 TV_{204}	—	October 5, 2013	Haleakala	Pan-STARRS 1	·	1.4 km	MPC · JPL
781872	2013 TP_{209}	—	October 3, 2013	Haleakala	Pan-STARRS 1	3:2	4.7 km	MPC · JPL
781873	2013 TB_{210}	—	October 14, 2013	Kitt Peak	Spacewatch	(1298)	2.1 km	MPC · JPL
781874	2013 TD_{210}	—	October 5, 2013	Haleakala	Pan-STARRS 1	·	1.3 km	MPC · JPL
781875	2013 TU_{215}	—	October 2, 2013	Mount Lemmon	Mount Lemmon Survey	·	1.6 km	MPC · JPL
781876	2013 TQ_{216}	—	October 3, 2013	Haleakala	Pan-STARRS 1	·	2.3 km	MPC · JPL
781877	2013 TN_{220}	—	October 22, 2009	Mount Lemmon	Mount Lemmon Survey	·	1.1 km	MPC · JPL
781878	2013 TO_{220}	—	October 5, 2013	Haleakala	Pan-STARRS 1	·	2.3 km	MPC · JPL
781879	2013 TR_{221}	—	October 3, 2013	Mount Lemmon	Mount Lemmon Survey	L5	6.0 km	MPC · JPL
781880	2013 TA_{222}	—	October 2, 2013	Mount Lemmon	Mount Lemmon Survey	·	1.3 km	MPC · JPL
781881	2013 TL_{223}	—	October 5, 2013	Haleakala	Pan-STARRS 1	·	1.8 km	MPC · JPL
781882	2013 TX_{224}	—	October 2, 2013	Mount Lemmon	Mount Lemmon Survey	KOR	980 m	MPC · JPL
781883	2013 TN_{225}	—	October 12, 2013	Kitt Peak	Spacewatch	·	1.4 km	MPC · JPL
781884	2013 TD_{226}	—	October 12, 2013	Mount Lemmon	Mount Lemmon Survey	KOR	960 m	MPC · JPL
781885	2013 TZ_{229}	—	October 8, 2013	Haleakala	Pan-STARRS 1	T_{j} (2.95) · 3:2	5.0 km	MPC · JPL
781886	2013 TK_{230}	—	October 2, 2013	Mount Lemmon	Mount Lemmon Survey	KOR	1.1 km	MPC · JPL
781887	2013 TN_{230}	—	October 3, 2013	Haleakala	Pan-STARRS 1	·	1.1 km	MPC · JPL
781888	2013 TZ_{231}	—	October 5, 2013	Haleakala	Pan-STARRS 1	·	2.1 km	MPC · JPL
781889	2013 TK_{233}	—	October 5, 2013	Haleakala	Pan-STARRS 1	·	1.9 km	MPC · JPL
781890	2013 TN_{233}	—	October 5, 2013	Haleakala	Pan-STARRS 1	·	1.8 km	MPC · JPL
781891	2013 TO_{236}	—	October 4, 2013	Mount Lemmon	Mount Lemmon Survey	URS	2.5 km	MPC · JPL
781892	2013 TZ_{238}	—	October 5, 2013	Haleakala	Pan-STARRS 1	·	1.9 km	MPC · JPL
781893	2013 TR_{247}	—	October 5, 2013	Haleakala	Pan-STARRS 1	·	2.2 km	MPC · JPL
781894	2013 TB_{248}	—	October 5, 2013	Mount Lemmon	Mount Lemmon Survey	KOR	830 m	MPC · JPL
781895	2013 TM_{248}	—	October 5, 2013	Haleakala	Pan-STARRS 1	EOS	1.3 km	MPC · JPL
781896	2013 TX_{249}	—	October 2, 2013	Haleakala	Pan-STARRS 1	·	1.3 km	MPC · JPL
781897	2013 TB_{251}	—	October 3, 2013	Mount Lemmon	Mount Lemmon Survey	·	1.5 km	MPC · JPL
781898	2013 TT_{251}	—	October 2, 2013	Mount Lemmon	Mount Lemmon Survey	KOR	1 km	MPC · JPL
781899	2013 TJ_{252}	—	October 3, 2013	Mount Lemmon	Mount Lemmon Survey	KOR	850 m	MPC · JPL
781900	2013 TK_{252}	—	October 5, 2013	Mount Lemmon	Mount Lemmon Survey	·	1 km	MPC · JPL

== 781901–782000 ==
back to top

Designation			Discovery			Properties		Ref
Permanent	Provisional	Named after	Date	Site	Discoverer(s)	Category	Diam.	Ref
781901	2013 TN_{252}	—	October 2, 2013	Mount Lemmon	Mount Lemmon Survey	·	1.3 km	MPC · JPL
781902	2013 TQ_{252}	—	December 10, 2009	Mount Lemmon	Mount Lemmon Survey	·	1.1 km	MPC · JPL
781903	2013 TF_{256}	—	April 27, 2017	Haleakala	Pan-STARRS 1	·	2.1 km	MPC · JPL
781904	2013 TZ_{261}	—	October 5, 2013	Haleakala	Pan-STARRS 1	·	1.9 km	MPC · JPL
781905	2013 TP_{276}	—	October 3, 2013	Kitt Peak	Spacewatch	·	2.2 km	MPC · JPL
781906	2013 TY_{279}	—	October 3, 2013	Mount Lemmon	Mount Lemmon Survey	·	2.2 km	MPC · JPL
781907	2013 TP_{281}	—	October 4, 2013	Mount Lemmon	Mount Lemmon Survey	·	2.3 km	MPC · JPL
781908	2013 TZ_{281}	—	October 5, 2013	Kitt Peak	Spacewatch	·	2.1 km	MPC · JPL
781909	2013 TR_{282}	—	October 5, 2013	Haleakala	Pan-STARRS 1	·	1.9 km	MPC · JPL
781910	2013 TV_{282}	—	October 9, 2013	Mount Lemmon	Mount Lemmon Survey	·	2.1 km	MPC · JPL
781911	2013 UN_{14}	—	September 28, 2013	Oukaïmeden	C. Rinner	·	2.9 km	MPC · JPL
781912	2013 UX_{14}	—	October 22, 2013	Mount Lemmon	Mount Lemmon Survey	AMO +1km	810 m	MPC · JPL
781913	2013 UL_{18}	—	October 26, 2013	Kitt Peak	Spacewatch	·	1.4 km	MPC · JPL
781914	2013 US_{19}	—	October 23, 2013	Mount Lemmon	Mount Lemmon Survey	·	1.8 km	MPC · JPL
781915	2013 UY_{19}	—	October 24, 2013	Mount Lemmon	Mount Lemmon Survey	·	1.7 km	MPC · JPL
781916	2013 UW_{20}	—	October 25, 2013	Mount Lemmon	Mount Lemmon Survey	·	2.3 km	MPC · JPL
781917	2013 UE_{28}	—	October 28, 2013	Mount Lemmon	Mount Lemmon Survey	TIR	2.1 km	MPC · JPL
781918	2013 UB_{29}	—	March 7, 2016	Haleakala	Pan-STARRS 1	·	2.3 km	MPC · JPL
781919	2013 UE_{30}	—	February 5, 2016	Haleakala	Pan-STARRS 1	·	2.5 km	MPC · JPL
781920	2013 UB_{31}	—	October 28, 2013	Mount Lemmon	Mount Lemmon Survey	·	1.9 km	MPC · JPL
781921	2013 UC_{31}	—	October 28, 2013	Mount Lemmon	Mount Lemmon Survey	·	2.1 km	MPC · JPL
781922	2013 UD_{32}	—	October 28, 2013	Mount Lemmon	Mount Lemmon Survey	(260)	2.8 km	MPC · JPL
781923	2013 UO_{32}	—	March 3, 2016	Mount Lemmon	Mount Lemmon Survey	·	2.2 km	MPC · JPL
781924	2013 UD_{33}	—	October 31, 2013	Kitt Peak	Spacewatch	·	1.6 km	MPC · JPL
781925	2013 UM_{33}	—	October 31, 2013	Kitt Peak	Spacewatch	·	1.4 km	MPC · JPL
781926	2013 UR_{33}	—	October 26, 2013	Kitt Peak	Spacewatch	·	1.1 km	MPC · JPL
781927	2013 UF_{34}	—	October 24, 2013	Mount Lemmon	Mount Lemmon Survey	THM	1.4 km	MPC · JPL
781928	2013 UJ_{34}	—	October 24, 2013	Mount Lemmon	Mount Lemmon Survey	THM	1.8 km	MPC · JPL
781929	2013 UM_{34}	—	October 24, 2013	Palomar	Palomar Transient Factory	·	2.7 km	MPC · JPL
781930	2013 UN_{34}	—	November 19, 2008	Kitt Peak	Spacewatch	·	1.3 km	MPC · JPL
781931	2013 UL_{35}	—	October 24, 2013	Mount Lemmon	Mount Lemmon Survey	·	1.1 km	MPC · JPL
781932	2013 UZ_{37}	—	October 23, 2013	Mount Lemmon	Mount Lemmon Survey	THM	1.8 km	MPC · JPL
781933	2013 UG_{38}	—	October 27, 2013	Kitt Peak	Spacewatch	·	1.5 km	MPC · JPL
781934	2013 UY_{39}	—	October 24, 2013	Mount Lemmon	Mount Lemmon Survey	HOF	2.2 km	MPC · JPL
781935	2013 UZ_{41}	—	October 25, 2013	Mount Lemmon	Mount Lemmon Survey	EOS	1.3 km	MPC · JPL
781936	2013 UY_{43}	—	October 26, 2013	Mount Lemmon	Mount Lemmon Survey	·	1.8 km	MPC · JPL
781937	2013 UM_{44}	—	October 23, 2013	Haleakala	Pan-STARRS 1	·	2.2 km	MPC · JPL
781938	2013 UO_{44}	—	October 23, 2013	Mount Lemmon	Mount Lemmon Survey	KOR	930 m	MPC · JPL
781939	2013 UQ_{44}	—	October 26, 2013	Mount Lemmon	Mount Lemmon Survey	·	1.5 km	MPC · JPL
781940	2013 UG_{45}	—	October 28, 2013	Mount Lemmon	Mount Lemmon Survey	·	1.3 km	MPC · JPL
781941	2013 UQ_{45}	—	October 31, 2013	Mount Lemmon	Mount Lemmon Survey	·	1.4 km	MPC · JPL
781942	2013 UY_{45}	—	October 28, 2013	Mount Lemmon	Mount Lemmon Survey	·	1.2 km	MPC · JPL
781943	2013 UV_{50}	—	October 28, 2013	Mount Lemmon	Mount Lemmon Survey	·	1.5 km	MPC · JPL
781944	2013 UW_{50}	—	October 24, 2013	Mount Lemmon	Mount Lemmon Survey	·	1.8 km	MPC · JPL
781945	2013 UX_{50}	—	October 24, 2013	Mount Lemmon	Mount Lemmon Survey	·	2.0 km	MPC · JPL
781946	2013 UD_{52}	—	October 25, 2013	Mount Lemmon	Mount Lemmon Survey	HOF	1.9 km	MPC · JPL
781947	2013 UV_{53}	—	September 23, 2008	Kitt Peak	Spacewatch	·	1.6 km	MPC · JPL
781948	2013 UB_{58}	—	October 26, 2013	Mount Lemmon	Mount Lemmon Survey	EOS	1.3 km	MPC · JPL
781949	2013 UR_{58}	—	October 23, 2013	Kitt Peak	Spacewatch	EOS	1.1 km	MPC · JPL
781950	2013 UV_{58}	—	October 26, 2013	Mount Lemmon	Mount Lemmon Survey	·	1.3 km	MPC · JPL
781951	2013 UW_{59}	—	October 25, 2013	Kitt Peak	Spacewatch	·	1.1 km	MPC · JPL
781952	2013 UY_{59}	—	October 24, 2013	Mount Lemmon	Mount Lemmon Survey	KOR	860 m	MPC · JPL
781953	2013 UK_{64}	—	October 24, 2013	Mount Lemmon	Mount Lemmon Survey	·	2.1 km	MPC · JPL
781954	2013 VE_{1}	—	October 28, 2013	Catalina	CSS	·	1 km	MPC · JPL
781955	2013 VF_{6}	—	November 4, 2013	Oukaïmeden	M. Ory	BRA	1.1 km	MPC · JPL
781956	2013 VO_{10}	—	October 1, 2013	Kitt Peak	Spacewatch	·	1.9 km	MPC · JPL
781957	2013 VS_{14}	—	November 8, 2013	Calar Alto-CASADO	Mottola, S., Hellmich, S.	·	1.8 km	MPC · JPL
781958	2013 VO_{20}	—	October 26, 2013	Catalina	CSS	·	2.4 km	MPC · JPL
781959	2013 VP_{27}	—	November 2, 2013	Kitt Peak	Spacewatch	·	1.2 km	MPC · JPL
781960	2013 VQ_{29}	—	November 9, 2013	Haleakala	Pan-STARRS 1	EOS	1.0 km	MPC · JPL
781961	2013 VJ_{42}	—	November 2, 2013	Mount Lemmon	Mount Lemmon Survey	·	860 m	MPC · JPL
781962	2013 VQ_{42}	—	November 8, 2013	Mount Lemmon	Mount Lemmon Survey	·	1.6 km	MPC · JPL
781963	2013 VH_{43}	—	November 6, 2013	Haleakala	Pan-STARRS 1	AEG	1.7 km	MPC · JPL
781964	2013 VU_{43}	—	November 11, 2013	Kitt Peak	Spacewatch	EUN	860 m	MPC · JPL
781965	2013 VQ_{44}	—	November 11, 2013	Mount Lemmon	Mount Lemmon Survey	EOS	1.5 km	MPC · JPL
781966	2013 VL_{48}	—	September 15, 2018	Kitt Peak	Spacewatch	·	2.2 km	MPC · JPL
781967	2013 VJ_{51}	—	November 2, 2013	Kitt Peak	Spacewatch	·	820 m	MPC · JPL
781968	2013 VL_{52}	—	November 11, 2013	Mount Lemmon	Mount Lemmon Survey	·	2.3 km	MPC · JPL
781969	2013 VY_{52}	—	November 10, 2013	Catalina	CSS	·	1.8 km	MPC · JPL
781970	2013 VD_{53}	—	November 6, 2013	Mount Lemmon	Mount Lemmon Survey	·	2.0 km	MPC · JPL
781971	2013 VS_{54}	—	November 9, 2013	Haleakala	Pan-STARRS 1	·	1.3 km	MPC · JPL
781972	2013 VB_{56}	—	November 2, 2013	Kitt Peak	Spacewatch	·	1.3 km	MPC · JPL
781973	2013 VF_{56}	—	November 10, 2013	Mount Lemmon	Mount Lemmon Survey	·	1.3 km	MPC · JPL
781974	2013 VC_{58}	—	November 2, 2013	Mount Lemmon	Mount Lemmon Survey	·	1.7 km	MPC · JPL
781975	2013 VD_{60}	—	November 9, 2013	Haleakala	Pan-STARRS 1	·	1.3 km	MPC · JPL
781976	2013 VL_{60}	—	November 4, 2013	Mount Lemmon	Mount Lemmon Survey	·	2.2 km	MPC · JPL
781977	2013 VU_{60}	—	November 1, 2013	Mount Lemmon	Mount Lemmon Survey	·	2.5 km	MPC · JPL
781978	2013 VS_{61}	—	November 8, 2013	Kitt Peak	Spacewatch	·	1.4 km	MPC · JPL
781979	2013 VY_{65}	—	November 10, 2013	Mount Lemmon	Mount Lemmon Survey	·	1.2 km	MPC · JPL
781980	2013 VQ_{66}	—	November 8, 2013	Mount Lemmon	Mount Lemmon Survey	·	1.4 km	MPC · JPL
781981	2013 VN_{67}	—	November 2, 2013	Kitt Peak	Spacewatch	VER	2.0 km	MPC · JPL
781982	2013 VS_{69}	—	November 6, 2013	Haleakala	Pan-STARRS 1	·	1.4 km	MPC · JPL
781983	2013 VX_{69}	—	November 12, 2013	Mount Lemmon	Mount Lemmon Survey	·	1.4 km	MPC · JPL
781984	2013 VB_{70}	—	November 10, 2013	Mount Lemmon	Mount Lemmon Survey	·	1.1 km	MPC · JPL
781985	2013 VS_{72}	—	November 1, 2013	Mount Lemmon	Mount Lemmon Survey	·	1.3 km	MPC · JPL
781986	2013 VG_{73}	—	November 8, 2013	Kitt Peak	Spacewatch	HOF	1.9 km	MPC · JPL
781987	2013 VR_{73}	—	November 9, 2013	Kitt Peak	Spacewatch	·	1.6 km	MPC · JPL
781988	2013 VU_{73}	—	November 2, 2013	Kitt Peak	Spacewatch	·	2.4 km	MPC · JPL
781989	2013 VT_{74}	—	November 9, 2013	Haleakala	Pan-STARRS 1	·	2.4 km	MPC · JPL
781990	2013 VX_{75}	—	November 1, 2013	Mount Lemmon	Mount Lemmon Survey	L5	6.7 km	MPC · JPL
781991	2013 VP_{78}	—	November 9, 2013	Mount Lemmon	Mount Lemmon Survey	·	1.8 km	MPC · JPL
781992	2013 VS_{78}	—	November 9, 2013	Haleakala	Pan-STARRS 1	·	2.0 km	MPC · JPL
781993	2013 VP_{79}	—	November 4, 2013	Haleakala	Pan-STARRS 1	·	2.4 km	MPC · JPL
781994	2013 VC_{80}	—	November 9, 2013	Mount Lemmon	Mount Lemmon Survey	·	1.3 km	MPC · JPL
781995	2013 VV_{80}	—	November 9, 2013	Mount Lemmon	Mount Lemmon Survey	·	1.7 km	MPC · JPL
781996	2013 VX_{81}	—	November 2, 2013	Mount Lemmon	Mount Lemmon Survey	·	1.3 km	MPC · JPL
781997	2013 VF_{82}	—	November 8, 2013	Mount Lemmon	Mount Lemmon Survey	·	1.6 km	MPC · JPL
781998	2013 VN_{82}	—	November 9, 2013	Kitt Peak	Spacewatch	AST	1.4 km	MPC · JPL
781999	2013 VE_{83}	—	November 9, 2013	Haleakala	Pan-STARRS 1	·	2.0 km	MPC · JPL
782000	2013 VU_{85}	—	November 8, 2013	Mount Lemmon	Mount Lemmon Survey	·	960 m	MPC · JPL

back to top

== Meaning of names ==
As minor planet discoveries are confirmed, they are given a permanent number by the IAU's Minor Planet Center (MPC), and the discoverers can then submit names for them, following the IAU's naming conventions. The list below concerns those minor planets in the specified number-range that have received names, and explains the meanings of those names.

Official naming citations of newly named small Solar System bodies are approved and published in a bulletin by IAU's Working Group for Small Bodies Nomenclature (WGSBN). Before May 2021, citations were published in MPC's Minor Planet Circulars for many decades. Recent citations can also be found on the JPL Small-Body Database (SBDB). Until his death in 2016, German astronomer Lutz D. Schmadel compiled these citations into the Dictionary of Minor Planet Names (DMP) and regularly updated the collection.

Based on Paul Herget's The Names of the Minor Planets, Schmadel also researched the unclear origin of numerous asteroids, most of which had been named prior to World War II. This article incorporates text from this source, which is in the public domain: SBDB New namings may only be added to this list below after official publication as the preannouncement of names is condemned. The WGSBN publishes a comprehensive guideline for the naming rules of non-cometary small Solar System bodies.

Named minor planet	Provisional	This minor planet was named for...	Ref · Catalog
781753 Scurtu	2013 RV_{162}	Virgil V. Scurtu, Romanian physicist and amateur astronomer.	IAU · 781753
