= 5040 Rabinowitz =

Main-belt asteroid

Discovery
- Discovered by: T. Gehrels
- Discovery site: Palomar Obs.
- Discovery date: 15 September 1972

Designations
- Named after: David Rabinowitz (American astronomer)
- Alternative designations: 1972 RF · 1987 QE
- Minor planet category: main-belt · Phocaea

Orbital characteristics
- Epoch 4 September 2017 (JD 2458000.5)
- Uncertainty parameter 0
- Observation arc: 46.20 yr (16,874 days)
- Aphelion: 2.9644 AU
- Perihelion: 1.8705 AU
- Semi-major axis: 2.4174 AU
- Eccentricity: 0.2263
- Orbital period (sidereal): 3.76 yr (1,373 days)
- Mean anomaly: 7.0892°
- Mean motion: 0° 15^{m} 43.92^{s} / day
- Inclination: 24.361°
- Longitude of ascending node: 175.69°
- Argument of perihelion: 149.71°

Physical characteristics
- Dimensions: 6.41 km (calculated)
- Synodic rotation period: 4.472±0.001 h 4.6901±0.0004 h (Note: Pravec (2013): lightcurve plot of (5040) Rabinowitz with a rotation period 4.6901±0.0004 hours with a brightness amplitude of 0.33 mag and an abs. magnitude of 12.73. Summary figures at Collaborative Asteroid Lightcurve Link (CALL) and Pravec, P.; Wolf, M.; Sarounova, L. (2013)); 4.691±0.001 h
- Geometric albedo: 0.23 (assumed)
- Spectral type: S
- Absolute magnitude (H): 12.73±0.13 (R) · 12.9 · 13.15±0.35 · 13.18

5040 Rabinowitz, provisional designation 1972 RF, is a stony Phocaea asteroid from the inner regions of the asteroid belt, approximately 6 kilometers in diameter. It was discovered by Dutch–American astronomer Tom Gehrels at Palomar Observatory on 15 September 1972. Contrary to most of his discoveries, this asteroid is unrelated to the Palomar–Leiden survey and exclusively credited to Tom Gehrels.

== Orbit and classification ==
The stony S-type asteroid is a member of the Phocaea family (701), a group of asteroids with similar orbital characteristics, named after its largest member, 25 Phocaea. It orbits the Sun in the inner main-belt at a distance of 1.9–3.0 AU once every 3 years and 9 months (1,373 days). Its orbit has an eccentricity of 0.23 and an inclination of 24° with respect to the ecliptic. A first precovery was taken at the discovering observatory in 1971, extending the body's observation arc by one year prior to its official discovery observation.

== Physical characteristics ==
=== Rotation period ===
In July 2013, a rotational lightcurve for this asteroid was obtained from photometric observations by Czech astronomer Petr Pravec at the Ondřejov Observatory. The well-defined lightcurve gave a rotation period of 4.6901±0.0004 hours with a brightness variation of 0.33 in magnitude (U=3).

During the same opposition opportunity, two more lightcurves – obtained by Robert Stephens at the Center for Solar System Studies and by Maurice Clark at the Preston Gott Observatory – gave a similar period of 4.691 and 4.472 hours, with an amplitude of 0.35 and 0.31 in magnitude, respectively (U=3-/2+).

=== Diameter and albedo ===
The Collaborative Asteroid Lightcurve Link assumes an albedo of 0.23, derived from the Phocaea family's namesake, and calculates a diameter of 6.4 kilometers with an absolute magnitude of 13.18.

== Naming ==
This minor planet was named after American astronomer David Rabinowitz (born 1960), a discoverer of minor planets himself and researcher at Yale University. The naming also honors his work for the Spacewatch program. The official naming citation was published by the Minor Planet Center on 1 September 1993 (M.P.C. 22505).
