= (175113) 2004 PF115 =

Trans-Neptunian object (TNO)

(175113) 2004 PF_{115}
- September 2026 Hubble Space Telescope image of 2004 PF_{115}

Discovery
- Discovered by: M. Brown, C. A. Trujillo, D. Rabinowitz
- Discovery date: 7 August 2004

Designations
- Minor planet category: TNO (plutino?)

Orbital characteristics
- Epoch 27 April 2019 (JD 2458600.5)
- Uncertainty parameter 3
- Observation arc: 9593 days (26.26 yr)
- Earliest precovery date: 4 June 1992
- Aphelion: 41.619 AU (6.2261 Tm)
- Perihelion: 36.519 AU (5.4632 Tm)
- Semi-major axis: 39.069 AU (5.8446 Tm)
- Eccentricity: 0.06527
- Orbital period (sidereal): 244.20 yr (89195.8 d)
- Mean anomaly: 167.19°
- Mean motion: 0° 0^{m} 14.665^{s} / day
- Inclination: 13.346°
- Longitude of ascending node: 84.441°
- Argument of perihelion: 87.197°
- Known satellites: 0
- Earth MOID: 35.5528 AU (5.31862 Tm)
- Jupiter MOID: 31.2172 AU (4.67003 Tm)

Physical characteristics
- Dimensions: 406.3+97.6 −75.3 km
- Geometric albedo: 0.113+0.082 −0.042
- Temperature: 45.2 K (perihelion)
- Absolute magnitude (H): 4.54±0.25, 4.3

(175113) 2004 PF_{115} is a trans-Neptunian object (TNO). It was discovered in 2006 by M. Brown, C. Trujillo, and D. Rabinowitz. The object was classified as a possible plutino, but no longer appears to be one.

The Hubble Space Telescope photographed 2004 PF_{115} on 8 September 2026, during a search for moons around large trans-Neptunian objects.

== Physical characteristics ==
The diameter of 2004 PF_{115} was measured by the Herschel Space Telescope to be 406.3+97.6
−75.3 km.
