= David L. Rabinowitz =

American astronomer (born 1960)

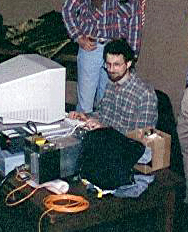
- Rabinowitz working at the NEAT-Project
- Born: David Lincoln Rabinowitz; 1960 (age 65–66)
- Education: Yale University; University of Chicago
- Known for: Co-discoverer of the new population of dwarf planets in the outer solar system
- Scientific career
- Fields: Astrophysics
- Workplaces: Yale University's Center for Astronomy and Astrophysics; University of Arizona Lunar and Planetary Laboratory
- Thesis: (1988)
- Website: physics.yale.edu/people/david-rabinowitz

David Lincoln Rabinowitz (born 1960) is an American astronomer, discoverer of minor planets and researcher at Yale University.

== Career ==
David Rabinowitz has built CCD cameras and software for the detection of near-Earth and Kuiper belt objects, and his research has helped reduce the assumed number of near-Earth asteroids larger than 1 km by half, from 1,000–2,000 to 500–1,000. He has also assisted in the detection of distant solar system objects, supernovae, and quasars, thereby helping to understand the origin and evolution of the Solar System and the dark energy driving the accelerated expansion of the universe.

Collaborating with Michael Brown and Chad Trujillo of the Quasar Equatorial Survey Team, he has participated in the discovery of several possible dwarf planets such as 90377 Sedna (possibly the first known inner Oort cloud object), 90482 Orcus, Eris (more massive than Pluto), Haumea, and Makemake, though no-one would get credit for Haumea.

Together with Tom Gehrels of the University of Arizona and his Spacewatch team, Rabinowitz discovered or co-discovered other astronomical objects including 5145 Pholus – a Centaur, credited by the MPC to Spacewatch– and the unnumbered Apollo near-Earth object 1991 BA, which remains uncredited.

== Awards and honors ==
The minor planet 5040 Rabinowitz, a Phocaea asteroid discovered by Tom Gehrels at Palomar Observatory in 1972, was named in his honor and for his work at Spacewatch.

== List of discovered minor planets ==
David Rabinowitz is credited by the Minor Planet Center with the discovery and co-discovery of 34 minor planets during 1989–2010.

90377 Sedna	14 November 2003	list^{[A]}^{[B]}
90482 Orcus	February 17, 2004	list^{[A]}^{[B]}
(120178) 2003 OP32	July 26, 2003	list^{[A]}^{[B]}
(120348) 2004 TY364	October 3, 2004	list^{[A]}^{[B]}
136199 Eris	October 21, 2003	list^{[A]}^{[B]}
136472 Makemake	March 31, 2005	list^{[A]}^{[B]}
(175113) 2004 PF115	August 7, 2004	list^{[A]}^{[B]}
(187661) 2007 JG_{43}	May 10, 2007	list^{[C]}^{[A]}
225088 Gonggong	July 17, 2007	list^{[C]}^{[A]}
229762 Gǃkúnǁʼhòmdímà	July 17, 2007	list^{[A]}^{[C]}

(305543) 2008 QY_{40}	August 25, 2008	list^{[C]}^{[A]}
(312645) 2010 EP_{65}	March 9, 2010	list^{[D]}
(316179) 2010 EN65	March 7, 2010	list^{[D]}
(349933) 2009 YF_{7}	December 19, 2009	list
(353222) 2009 YD_{7}	December 16, 2009	list
(382004) 2010 RM_{64}	September 9, 2010	list^{[C]}^{[D]}
(386723) 2009 YE7	December 17, 2009	list
(445473) 2010 VZ98	November 11, 2010	list^{[C]}^{[D]}
(471136) 2010 EO_{65}	March 9, 2010	list^{[D]}
(471137) 2010 ET_{65}	March 13, 2010	list^{[D]}

(471149) 2010 FB_{49}	March 17, 2010	list^{[D]}
(471150) 2010 FC_{49}	March 18, 2010	list^{[D]}
(471151) 2010 FD_{49}	March 19, 2010	list^{[D]}
(471152) 2010 FE_{49}	March 19, 2010	list^{[D]}
(471155) 2010 GF_{65}	April 14, 2010	list^{[D]}
(471172) 2010 JC_{80}	May 12, 2010	list^{[D]}
(471196) 2010 PK_{66}	August 14, 2010	list^{[C]}^{[D]}
(471210) 2010 VW_{11}	November 3, 2010	list^{[C]}^{[D]}
(496816) 1989 UP	October 27, 1989	list^{[E]}
(499522) 2010 PL_{66}	August 14, 2010	list^{[C]}^{[D]}

(504555) 2008 SO_{266}	September 24, 2008	list^{[C]}^{[A]}
(523618) 2007 RT_{15}	September 11, 2007	list^{[C]}^{[A]}
(523629) 2008 SP_{266}	September 26, 2008	list^{[C]}^{[A]}
(528381) 2008 ST291	September 24, 2008	list^{[C]}^{[A]}
Co-discovery made with:^{A} M. E. Brown^{B} C. Trujillo^{C} M. E. Schwamb^{D} S. Tourtellotte^{E} J. V. Scotti

1992AD is with a comet-like orbit of 92.26 years without a tail, which orbits between Saturn and Neptune. It was discovered by Rabinowitz in 1992 and was officially named Pholus. Another body that he discovered in 1993 was named Nessus with an orbit of 123.2 years. This one orbits between Saturn and Pluto.
