= (523676) 2013 UL10 =

Red comet-like centaur

(523676) 2013 UL_{10}
Discovery
- Discovered by: Pan-STARRS 1
- Discovery site: Haleakalā Obs.
- Discovery date: 18 August 2010

Designations
- Minor planet category: centaur

Orbital characteristics
- Epoch 1 July 2021 (JD 2459396.5)
- Uncertainty parameter 1 · 0
- Observation arc: 7.56 yr (2,761 d)
- Aphelion: 13.658 AU
- Perihelion: 6.1724 AU
- Semi-major axis: 9.9153 AU
- Eccentricity: 0.3775
- Orbital period (sidereal): 31.22 yr (11,404 d)
- Mean anomaly: 81.728°
- Mean motion: 0° 1^{m} 53.76^{s} / day
- Inclination: 19.164°
- Longitude of ascending node: 233.98°
- Time of perihelion: 4 June 2014 (Note: JPL Horizons Observer Location: @sun (Perihelion occurs when deldot changes from negative to positive.))
- Argument of perihelion: 186.17°
- T_{Jupiter}: 2.94

Physical characteristics
- Mean diameter: ≤10 km (nucleus); 12 km (est. at 0.09)
- Synodic rotation period: n.a.
- Geometric albedo: 0.12 (nucleus)
- Spectral type: B–V = 0.97±0.02; V–R = 0.67±0.02; B–R = 1.64±0.03
- Absolute magnitude (H): 12.8

(523676) 2013 UL_{10} is a reddish centaur with cometary activity orbiting the Sun between Jupiter and Uranus. It was discovered on 18 August 2010, by a team of astronomers with the Pan-STARRS survey at the Haleakalā Observatory, Hawaii. It is the first centaur known to have both comet-like activity and red surface colors. It is also one of the smallest centaurs, with a nucleus of no more than 10 kilometers (6.2 miles) in diameter. As of 2021, it has not been named.

== Orbit and classification ==
This object belongs to the centaurs, a dynamically unstable population of small Solar System bodies with chaotic orbits between the classical asteroids and the trans-Neptunian objects. Centaurs are considered to be objects with short lifetimes of approximately one million years, transitioning from the inactive population of Kuiper belt objects to the active group of Jupiter-family comets. 2013 UL_{10} orbits the Sun at a distance of 6.2–13.7 AU once every 31 years and 3 months (11,404 days; semi-major axis of 9.92 AU). Its orbit has a high eccentricity of 0.38 and an inclination of 19° with respect to the ecliptic. It has a Tisserand's parameter with respect to Jupiter (T_{J}) of 2.94, near the threshold of 3, typically used to distinguish asteroids from Jupiter-family comets. On 4 June 2014, the object came to perihelion at 6.2 AU and has since been moving away from the Sun. As of 2021 the object is at 10.7 AU, The body's observation arc begins with its official discovery observation at Haleakalā Observatory in August 2010.

== Numbering and naming ==
This minor planet was numbered by the Minor Planet Center on 25 September 2018, receiving the number 523676 in the minor planet catalog (M.P.C. 111778). As of 2025, it has not been named. According to the established naming conventions, it will be named after one of the many centaurs from Greek mythology, which are creatures with the upper body of a human and the lower body and legs of a horse.

== Physical characteristics ==
2013 UL_{10} has color index values similar to those of 1998 BU_{48}.

As with other populations, the centaurs show a bimodal distribution of colors: red and blue-grey. Cometary-like activity is well known among the grey centaurs, prominently represented by 2060 Chiron, which is also the namesake of the Chiron-type comets. However, outgassing activity of red centaurs (e.g. 5145 Pholus) has not been observed. 2013 UL_{10} is the first of the group of red centaurs to display clear evidence of cometary activity.

In October 2014, 2013 UL_{10} was observed by astronomers using the Large Monolithic Imager of the 4.3-meter Discovery Channel Telescope in Arizona. An overall reddish color was determined with B–V, V–R and B–R color indices of 0.97±0.02, 0.67±0.02 and 1.64±0.03, respectively. It was the intrinsically faintest object observed for this study, with an absolute magnitude 13.46.

In December 2015, observations with the Galileo National Telescope on the Canary Islands revealed that 2013 UL_{10} exhibits comet-like activity. Apart from the object's dust coma, the astronomers also deduced a diameter of no more than 10 kilometers (6.2 miles) for this centaur's nucleus, assuming an albedo of 0.12. Further photometric observations gave a dust production rate of 10 kg/s near the object's perihelion at 6.2 AU.

The Collaborative Asteroid Lightcurve Link an estimates a diameter of kilometers 15.3 based on a albedo of 0.057 (carbonaceous) and on an absolute magnitude of 12.8. As of 2021, no rotational lightcurve of 2013 UL_{10} has been obtained from photometric observations. The body's rotation period, pole and shape remain unknown.

== See also ==
- List of centaurs (small Solar System bodies) § 523676
