= List of minor planets: 523001–524000 =

The following is a partial list of minor planets, running from minor-planet number 523001 through 524000, inclusive. The primary data for this and other partial lists is based on JPL's "Small-Body Orbital Elements" and data available from the Minor Planet Center. Critical list information is also provided by the MPC, unless otherwise specified from Lowell Observatory. A detailed description of the table's columns and additional sources are given on the main page including a complete list of every page in this series, and a statistical break-up on the dynamical classification of minor planets.

Also see the summary list of all named bodies in numerical and alphabetical order, and the corresponding naming citations for the number range of this particular list. New namings may only be added to this list after official publication, as the preannouncement of names is condemned by the Working Group for Small Bodies Nomenclature of the International Astronomical Union.

Near-Earth obj.	MBA (inner)	MBA (outer)	Centaur
Mars-crosser	MBA (middle)	Jupiter trojan	Trans-Neptunian obj.
Unclassified

== 523001–523100 ==
Designation			Discovery			Properties		Ref
Permanent	Provisional	Named after	Date	Site	Discoverer(s)	Category	Diam.	Ref
523001	2016 PH_{121}	—	November 2, 2007	Kitt Peak	Spacewatch	KOR	1.4 km	MPC · JPL
523002	2016 PK_{121}	—	October 4, 2007	Kitt Peak	Spacewatch	·	2.3 km	MPC · JPL
523003	2016 PL_{121}	—	September 18, 2006	Kitt Peak	Spacewatch	EOS	1.8 km	MPC · JPL
523004	2016 PM_{121}	—	May 19, 2005	Mount Lemmon	Mount Lemmon Survey	KOR	1.4 km	MPC · JPL
523005	2016 PO_{121}	—	February 25, 2011	Mount Lemmon	Mount Lemmon Survey	·	930 m	MPC · JPL
523006	2016 PP_{121}	—	September 26, 2011	Haleakala	Pan-STARRS 1	·	2.1 km	MPC · JPL
523007	2016 PX_{121}	—	October 18, 2012	Haleakala	Pan-STARRS 1	·	1.8 km	MPC · JPL
523008	2016 PY_{121}	—	May 28, 2006	Kitt Peak	Spacewatch	·	2.2 km	MPC · JPL
523009	2016 PZ_{121}	—	April 19, 2007	Kitt Peak	Spacewatch	·	1.0 km	MPC · JPL
523010	2016 PR_{122}	—	November 18, 2008	Kitt Peak	Spacewatch	·	1.0 km	MPC · JPL
523011	2016 PS_{122}	—	August 27, 2006	Kitt Peak	Spacewatch	·	1.5 km	MPC · JPL
523012	2016 PW_{122}	—	September 23, 2008	Mount Lemmon	Mount Lemmon Survey	·	1.0 km	MPC · JPL
523013	2016 PY_{122}	—	August 27, 2006	Kitt Peak	Spacewatch	·	1.5 km	MPC · JPL
523014	2016 PD_{123}	—	December 27, 2011	Kitt Peak	Spacewatch	·	2.3 km	MPC · JPL
523015	2016 PH_{123}	—	April 5, 2014	Haleakala	Pan-STARRS 1	AGN	1.2 km	MPC · JPL
523016	2016 PM_{123}	—	October 11, 2007	Kitt Peak	Spacewatch	·	1.6 km	MPC · JPL
523017	2016 PW_{123}	—	October 10, 2007	Mount Lemmon	Mount Lemmon Survey	·	1.8 km	MPC · JPL
523018	2016 PX_{123}	—	October 5, 2005	Kitt Peak	Spacewatch	·	2.3 km	MPC · JPL
523019	2016 PZ_{123}	—	August 10, 2016	Haleakala	Pan-STARRS 1	·	2.8 km	MPC · JPL
523020	2016 PE_{124}	—	August 27, 2006	Kitt Peak	Spacewatch	KOR	1.5 km	MPC · JPL
523021	2016 PF_{124}	—	September 13, 2005	Kitt Peak	Spacewatch	·	2.3 km	MPC · JPL
523022	2016 PK_{124}	—	July 19, 2015	Haleakala	Pan-STARRS 1	·	2.4 km	MPC · JPL
523023	2016 PL_{124}	—	January 25, 2006	Kitt Peak	Spacewatch	CYB	3.2 km	MPC · JPL
523024	2016 PP_{124}	—	February 25, 2007	Kitt Peak	Spacewatch	·	2.4 km	MPC · JPL
523025	2016 PQ_{124}	—	October 11, 2007	Kitt Peak	Spacewatch	PAD	1.8 km	MPC · JPL
523026	2016 PV_{124}	—	February 28, 2008	Kitt Peak	Spacewatch	·	660 m	MPC · JPL
523027	2016 PW_{124}	—	March 17, 2005	Kitt Peak	Spacewatch	·	1.9 km	MPC · JPL
523028	2016 PZ_{124}	—	October 28, 2011	Mount Lemmon	Mount Lemmon Survey	·	2.7 km	MPC · JPL
523029	2016 PL_{125}	—	May 8, 2008	Mount Lemmon	Mount Lemmon Survey	CLA	1.5 km	MPC · JPL
523030	2016 PN_{125}	—	August 31, 2005	Kitt Peak	Spacewatch	·	1.0 km	MPC · JPL
523031	2016 PT_{125}	—	October 20, 2012	Haleakala	Pan-STARRS 1	·	1.5 km	MPC · JPL
523032	2016 PV_{125}	—	June 14, 2010	Mount Lemmon	Mount Lemmon Survey	·	2.4 km	MPC · JPL
523033	2016 PW_{125}	—	October 13, 2006	Kitt Peak	Spacewatch	·	2.6 km	MPC · JPL
523034	2016 PZ_{125}	—	September 19, 2011	Haleakala	Pan-STARRS 1	EOS	1.9 km	MPC · JPL
523035	2016 PA_{126}	—	September 2, 2010	Mount Lemmon	Mount Lemmon Survey	·	3.4 km	MPC · JPL
523036	2016 PF_{126}	—	October 1, 2011	Kitt Peak	Spacewatch	·	2.8 km	MPC · JPL
523037	2016 PN_{126}	—	October 28, 2008	Kitt Peak	Spacewatch	·	1.1 km	MPC · JPL
523038	2016 PP_{126}	—	February 13, 2008	Kitt Peak	Spacewatch	·	2.7 km	MPC · JPL
523039	2016 PU_{126}	—	September 23, 2008	Kitt Peak	Spacewatch	(5)	1.1 km	MPC · JPL
523040	2016 PX_{126}	—	April 20, 2015	Haleakala	Pan-STARRS 1	·	1.4 km	MPC · JPL
523041	2016 PA_{127}	—	February 13, 2008	Mount Lemmon	Mount Lemmon Survey	·	2.7 km	MPC · JPL
523042	2016 PG_{127}	—	August 30, 2005	Kitt Peak	Spacewatch	·	2.9 km	MPC · JPL
523043	2016 PH_{127}	—	August 26, 2012	Kitt Peak	Spacewatch	PHO	990 m	MPC · JPL
523044	2016 PM_{127}	—	September 11, 2010	Kitt Peak	Spacewatch	CYB	2.8 km	MPC · JPL
523045	2016 PT_{127}	—	January 28, 2007	Kitt Peak	Spacewatch	·	2.7 km	MPC · JPL
523046	2016 QN_{1}	—	November 17, 2001	Socorro	LINEAR	H	550 m	MPC · JPL
523047	2016 QE_{7}	—	January 15, 2008	Kitt Peak	Spacewatch	·	2.3 km	MPC · JPL
523048	2016 QH_{47}	—	January 19, 2015	Mount Lemmon	Mount Lemmon Survey	H	590 m	MPC · JPL
523049	2016 QD_{80}	—	February 15, 2010	Mount Lemmon	Mount Lemmon Survey	·	1.2 km	MPC · JPL
523050	2016 QQ_{85}	—	July 6, 2013	Haleakala	Pan-STARRS 1	H	510 m	MPC · JPL
523051	2016 QP_{90}	—	March 16, 2009	Kitt Peak	Spacewatch	KOR	1.4 km	MPC · JPL
523052	2016 QQ_{90}	—	June 13, 2005	Mount Lemmon	Mount Lemmon Survey	·	1.7 km	MPC · JPL
523053	2016 QR_{90}	—	August 24, 2011	Haleakala	Pan-STARRS 1	·	1.8 km	MPC · JPL
523054	2016 QS_{90}	—	November 14, 2007	Kitt Peak	Spacewatch	·	2.0 km	MPC · JPL
523055	2016 QT_{90}	—	November 6, 2005	Kitt Peak	Spacewatch	·	3.6 km	MPC · JPL
523056	2016 QX_{90}	—	January 28, 2014	Mount Lemmon	Mount Lemmon Survey	MAR	1.1 km	MPC · JPL
523057	2016 QB_{91}	—	May 8, 2014	Haleakala	Pan-STARRS 1	·	2.3 km	MPC · JPL
523058	2016 QC_{91}	—	September 3, 2007	Catalina	CSS	·	1.7 km	MPC · JPL
523059	2016 QE_{91}	—	June 17, 2015	Haleakala	Pan-STARRS 1	·	2.1 km	MPC · JPL
523060	2016 QF_{91}	—	August 17, 2016	Haleakala	Pan-STARRS 1	MAR	1.3 km	MPC · JPL
523061	2016 QG_{91}	—	October 21, 2012	Catalina	CSS	·	1.5 km	MPC · JPL
523062	2016 QH_{91}	—	April 30, 2009	Kitt Peak	Spacewatch	·	2.2 km	MPC · JPL
523063	2016 QO_{91}	—	November 23, 2006	Kitt Peak	Spacewatch	·	1.7 km	MPC · JPL
523064	2016 QT_{91}	—	February 24, 2014	Haleakala	Pan-STARRS 1	·	1.4 km	MPC · JPL
523065	2016 QA_{92}	—	February 28, 2014	Haleakala	Pan-STARRS 1	AST	1.5 km	MPC · JPL
523066	2016 QE_{92}	—	October 25, 2011	Haleakala	Pan-STARRS 1	EOS	1.5 km	MPC · JPL
523067	2016 QG_{92}	—	December 11, 2013	Haleakala	Pan-STARRS 1	·	1.1 km	MPC · JPL
523068	2016 QP_{92}	—	February 22, 2009	Kitt Peak	Spacewatch	KOR	1.4 km	MPC · JPL
523069	2016 QR_{92}	—	October 24, 2011	Mount Lemmon	Mount Lemmon Survey	·	1.6 km	MPC · JPL
523070	2016 QT_{92}	—	September 24, 2007	Kitt Peak	Spacewatch	·	1.6 km	MPC · JPL
523071	2016 QU_{92}	—	October 22, 2012	Haleakala	Pan-STARRS 1	·	1.4 km	MPC · JPL
523072	2016 QW_{92}	—	January 21, 2014	Mount Lemmon	Mount Lemmon Survey	·	2.5 km	MPC · JPL
523073	2016 QX_{92}	—	January 18, 2012	Kitt Peak	Spacewatch	CYB	2.6 km	MPC · JPL
523074	2016 QC_{93}	—	September 21, 2011	Mount Lemmon	Mount Lemmon Survey	·	2.0 km	MPC · JPL
523075	2016 QH_{93}	—	February 24, 2014	Haleakala	Pan-STARRS 1	·	1.8 km	MPC · JPL
523076	2016 QK_{93}	—	January 9, 2014	Haleakala	Pan-STARRS 1	·	1.9 km	MPC · JPL
523077	2016 QL_{93}	—	October 18, 2012	Haleakala	Pan-STARRS 1	EUN	1.0 km	MPC · JPL
523078	2016 QM_{93}	—	October 25, 2005	Catalina	CSS	·	3.8 km	MPC · JPL
523079	2016 QN_{93}	—	July 29, 2008	Kitt Peak	Spacewatch	V	620 m	MPC · JPL
523080	2016 QQ_{93}	—	September 13, 2005	Kitt Peak	Spacewatch	·	1.1 km	MPC · JPL
523081	2016 QW_{93}	—	March 18, 2010	Mount Lemmon	Mount Lemmon Survey	·	1.9 km	MPC · JPL
523082	2016 QX_{93}	—	February 28, 2014	Mount Lemmon	Mount Lemmon Survey	·	1.1 km	MPC · JPL
523083	2016 QA_{94}	—	January 1, 2008	Kitt Peak	Spacewatch	EOS	1.8 km	MPC · JPL
523084	2016 QJ_{94}	—	January 13, 2008	Kitt Peak	Spacewatch	TIR	3.0 km	MPC · JPL
523085	2016 QQ_{94}	—	April 30, 2009	Kitt Peak	Spacewatch	EOS	1.8 km	MPC · JPL
523086	2016 RV_{2}	—	December 26, 2006	Kitt Peak	Spacewatch	V	600 m	MPC · JPL
523087	2016 RF_{28}	—	February 10, 2014	Haleakala	Pan-STARRS 1	·	1.8 km	MPC · JPL
523088	2016 RS_{41}	—	February 14, 2010	Mount Lemmon	Mount Lemmon Survey	·	1.6 km	MPC · JPL
523089	2016 RO_{42}	—	October 10, 2008	Mount Lemmon	Mount Lemmon Survey	H	490 m	MPC · JPL
523090	2016 RF_{47}	—	November 7, 2012	Haleakala	Pan-STARRS 1	·	1.2 km	MPC · JPL
523091	2016 RH_{47}	—	September 17, 2006	Kitt Peak	Spacewatch	·	2.0 km	MPC · JPL
523092	2016 RL_{47}	—	October 21, 2007	Kitt Peak	Spacewatch	·	2.2 km	MPC · JPL
523093	2016 RO_{47}	—	December 3, 2008	Mount Lemmon	Mount Lemmon Survey	·	1.2 km	MPC · JPL
523094	2016 RY_{47}	—	October 18, 2007	Kitt Peak	Spacewatch	HOF	2.1 km	MPC · JPL
523095	2016 RB_{48}	—	November 24, 2006	Kitt Peak	Spacewatch	EOS	1.6 km	MPC · JPL
523096	2016 RD_{48}	—	November 19, 2006	Kitt Peak	Spacewatch	·	3.0 km	MPC · JPL
523097	2016 RG_{48}	—	December 8, 2012	Mount Lemmon	Mount Lemmon Survey	·	1.9 km	MPC · JPL
523098	2016 RM_{48}	—	November 27, 2012	Mount Lemmon	Mount Lemmon Survey	·	1.7 km	MPC · JPL
523099	2016 RR_{48}	—	December 4, 2012	Mount Lemmon	Mount Lemmon Survey	EUN	930 m	MPC · JPL
523100	2016 RT_{48}	—	August 18, 2006	Kitt Peak	Spacewatch	·	1.7 km	MPC · JPL

== 523101–523200 ==
back to top

Designation			Discovery			Properties		Ref
Permanent	Provisional	Named after	Date	Site	Discoverer(s)	Category	Diam.	Ref
523101	2016 RW_{48}	—	August 28, 2012	Mount Lemmon	Mount Lemmon Survey	·	1.5 km	MPC · JPL
523102	2016 RY_{48}	—	September 21, 2003	Kitt Peak	Spacewatch	·	1.2 km	MPC · JPL
523103	2016 RZ_{48}	—	August 27, 2011	Haleakala	Pan-STARRS 1	·	1.8 km	MPC · JPL
523104	2016 RC_{49}	—	September 21, 2011	Kitt Peak	Spacewatch	·	1.7 km	MPC · JPL
523105	2016 RR_{49}	—	August 13, 2010	Kitt Peak	Spacewatch	·	2.5 km	MPC · JPL
523106	2016 RZ_{49}	—	July 28, 2011	Haleakala	Pan-STARRS 1	·	1.5 km	MPC · JPL
523107	2016 RA_{50}	—	December 2, 2008	Kitt Peak	Spacewatch	·	1.1 km	MPC · JPL
523108	2016 RG_{50}	—	February 11, 2014	Mount Lemmon	Mount Lemmon Survey	·	1.2 km	MPC · JPL
523109	2016 SP	—	October 27, 2011	Mount Lemmon	Mount Lemmon Survey	H	390 m	MPC · JPL
523110	2016 SU_{51}	—	December 10, 2006	Kitt Peak	Spacewatch	·	1.3 km	MPC · JPL
523111	2016 SW_{51}	—	September 17, 2006	Kitt Peak	Spacewatch	·	1.4 km	MPC · JPL
523112	2016 SX_{51}	—	February 13, 2008	Kitt Peak	Spacewatch	EOS	1.8 km	MPC · JPL
523113	2016 SF_{52}	—	December 4, 2008	Kitt Peak	Spacewatch	·	2.1 km	MPC · JPL
523114	2016 SJ_{52}	—	October 7, 2007	Kitt Peak	Spacewatch	AGN	1.1 km	MPC · JPL
523115	2016 SK_{52}	—	May 15, 2009	Kitt Peak	Spacewatch	·	2.1 km	MPC · JPL
523116	2016 SN_{52}	—	May 16, 2010	Mount Lemmon	Mount Lemmon Survey	·	2.0 km	MPC · JPL
523117	2016 SO_{52}	—	March 8, 2013	Haleakala	Pan-STARRS 1	·	1.9 km	MPC · JPL
523118	2016 SP_{52}	—	February 9, 2014	Mount Lemmon	Mount Lemmon Survey	·	1.4 km	MPC · JPL
523119	2016 SR_{52}	—	October 24, 2011	Mount Lemmon	Mount Lemmon Survey	EOS	1.6 km	MPC · JPL
523120	2016 SY_{52}	—	February 5, 2013	Kitt Peak	Spacewatch	·	1.9 km	MPC · JPL
523121	2016 SB_{53}	—	April 29, 2014	Haleakala	Pan-STARRS 1	EOS	1.7 km	MPC · JPL
523122	2016 SD_{53}	—	December 19, 2007	Kitt Peak	Spacewatch	·	1.7 km	MPC · JPL
523123	2016 SL_{53}	—	September 23, 2011	Mount Lemmon	Mount Lemmon Survey	·	1.5 km	MPC · JPL
523124	2016 SM_{53}	—	September 16, 2009	Kitt Peak	Spacewatch	·	780 m	MPC · JPL
523125	2016 SN_{53}	—	October 20, 2006	Kitt Peak	Spacewatch	·	1.6 km	MPC · JPL
523126	2016 SQ_{53}	—	May 23, 2006	Kitt Peak	Spacewatch	·	1.5 km	MPC · JPL
523127	2016 SS_{53}	—	November 9, 2007	Mount Lemmon	Mount Lemmon Survey	AGN	1.0 km	MPC · JPL
523128	2016 ST_{53}	—	January 13, 2008	Kitt Peak	Spacewatch	·	1.6 km	MPC · JPL
523129	2016 SY_{53}	—	February 2, 2008	Kitt Peak	Spacewatch	·	1.4 km	MPC · JPL
523130	2016 SZ_{53}	—	September 11, 1994	Kitt Peak	Spacewatch	·	2.5 km	MPC · JPL
523131	2016 SB_{54}	—	September 17, 2010	Mount Lemmon	Mount Lemmon Survey	·	2.1 km	MPC · JPL
523132	2016 SD_{54}	—	April 17, 2009	Kitt Peak	Spacewatch	·	2.9 km	MPC · JPL
523133	2016 SH_{54}	—	October 23, 2009	Mount Lemmon	Mount Lemmon Survey	·	1.1 km	MPC · JPL
523134	2016 SK_{54}	—	May 20, 2014	Haleakala	Pan-STARRS 1	·	1.4 km	MPC · JPL
523135	2016 SL_{54}	—	February 27, 2014	Mount Lemmon	Mount Lemmon Survey	·	2.1 km	MPC · JPL
523136	2016 SM_{54}	—	February 26, 2014	Mount Lemmon	Mount Lemmon Survey	·	1.7 km	MPC · JPL
523137	2016 SN_{54}	—	June 11, 2015	Haleakala	Pan-STARRS 1	·	1.7 km	MPC · JPL
523138	2016 SO_{54}	—	February 27, 2014	Haleakala	Pan-STARRS 1	MAR	840 m	MPC · JPL
523139	2016 SR_{54}	—	January 22, 2013	Mount Lemmon	Mount Lemmon Survey	EOS	1.7 km	MPC · JPL
523140	2016 SW_{54}	—	January 4, 2013	Mount Lemmon	Mount Lemmon Survey	·	1.5 km	MPC · JPL
523141	2016 SX_{54}	—	July 7, 2010	Kitt Peak	Spacewatch	·	2.0 km	MPC · JPL
523142	2016 SY_{54}	—	June 15, 2015	Haleakala	Pan-STARRS 1	·	880 m	MPC · JPL
523143	2016 SZ_{54}	—	March 25, 2014	Mount Lemmon	Mount Lemmon Survey	·	2.0 km	MPC · JPL
523144	2016 SA_{55}	—	October 26, 2011	Haleakala	Pan-STARRS 1	·	2.0 km	MPC · JPL
523145	2016 SE_{55}	—	September 19, 2009	Mount Lemmon	Mount Lemmon Survey	·	690 m	MPC · JPL
523146	2016 SG_{55}	—	September 7, 2011	Kitt Peak	Spacewatch	KOR	1.2 km	MPC · JPL
523147	2016 SK_{55}	—	January 1, 2009	Kitt Peak	Spacewatch	·	1.7 km	MPC · JPL
523148	2016 SM_{55}	—	October 27, 2005	Kitt Peak	Spacewatch	·	2.8 km	MPC · JPL
523149	2016 SN_{55}	—	October 26, 2011	Haleakala	Pan-STARRS 1	·	1.9 km	MPC · JPL
523150	2016 TR	—	October 24, 2008	Kitt Peak	Spacewatch	H	530 m	MPC · JPL
523151	2016 TR_{8}	—	October 28, 2011	Mount Lemmon	Mount Lemmon Survey	·	2.5 km	MPC · JPL
523152	2016 TU_{8}	—	January 14, 2012	Haleakala	Pan-STARRS 1	H	480 m	MPC · JPL
523153	2016 TJ_{19}	—	December 1, 2006	Mount Lemmon	Mount Lemmon Survey	H	660 m	MPC · JPL
523154	2016 TT_{47}	—	January 30, 2004	Kitt Peak	Spacewatch	·	1.9 km	MPC · JPL
523155	2016 TA_{55}	—	November 18, 2003	Kitt Peak	Spacewatch	H	520 m	MPC · JPL
523156	2016 TB_{55}	—	October 26, 2011	Haleakala	Pan-STARRS 1	H	470 m	MPC · JPL
523157	2016 TJ_{57}	—	April 29, 2014	Haleakala	Pan-STARRS 1	·	3.1 km	MPC · JPL
523158	2016 TA_{90}	—	April 24, 2011	Mount Lemmon	Mount Lemmon Survey	·	610 m	MPC · JPL
523159	2016 TK_{97}	—	October 15, 1999	Kitt Peak	Spacewatch	HNS	1.1 km	MPC · JPL
523160	2016 TR_{97}	—	May 23, 2014	Haleakala	Pan-STARRS 1	·	1.1 km	MPC · JPL
523161	2016 TW_{97}	—	November 1, 2011	Kitt Peak	Spacewatch	·	2.8 km	MPC · JPL
523162	2016 TX_{97}	—	June 13, 2015	Haleakala	Pan-STARRS 1	·	1.4 km	MPC · JPL
523163	2016 TB_{98}	—	May 29, 2010	WISE	WISE	·	3.0 km	MPC · JPL
523164	2016 TN_{98}	—	June 17, 2005	Mount Lemmon	Mount Lemmon Survey	·	2.3 km	MPC · JPL
523165	2016 TT_{98}	—	January 30, 2006	Kitt Peak	Spacewatch	·	1.1 km	MPC · JPL
523166	2016 TW_{98}	—	March 8, 2014	Mount Lemmon	Mount Lemmon Survey	EUN	1.0 km	MPC · JPL
523167	2016 TY_{98}	—	October 15, 2007	Kitt Peak	Spacewatch	HNS	1.0 km	MPC · JPL
523168	2016 TB_{99}	—	June 19, 2010	Mount Lemmon	Mount Lemmon Survey	EOS	1.8 km	MPC · JPL
523169	2016 TD_{99}	—	December 30, 2008	Mount Lemmon	Mount Lemmon Survey	·	1.8 km	MPC · JPL
523170	2016 TE_{99}	—	July 24, 2015	Haleakala	Pan-STARRS 1	CYB	3.3 km	MPC · JPL
523171	2016 TF_{99}	—	December 8, 2005	Kitt Peak	Spacewatch	·	3.0 km	MPC · JPL
523172	2016 TG_{99}	—	May 14, 2009	Kitt Peak	Spacewatch	·	2.6 km	MPC · JPL
523173	2016 TJ_{99}	—	June 18, 2015	Haleakala	Pan-STARRS 1	·	1.6 km	MPC · JPL
523174	2016 TL_{99}	—	January 14, 2008	Kitt Peak	Spacewatch	·	2.8 km	MPC · JPL
523175	2016 TM_{99}	—	February 8, 2013	Haleakala	Pan-STARRS 1	EOS	1.6 km	MPC · JPL
523176	2016 TN_{99}	—	February 20, 2009	Kitt Peak	Spacewatch	·	1.9 km	MPC · JPL
523177	2016 TO_{99}	—	December 15, 2007	Mount Lemmon	Mount Lemmon Survey	AGN	1.1 km	MPC · JPL
523178	2016 TP_{99}	—	August 28, 2011	Siding Spring	SSS	·	2.2 km	MPC · JPL
523179	2016 TQ_{99}	—	September 29, 2005	Mount Lemmon	Mount Lemmon Survey	EOS	1.7 km	MPC · JPL
523180	2016 TR_{99}	—	August 10, 2015	Haleakala	Pan-STARRS 1	·	2.0 km	MPC · JPL
523181	2016 TU_{99}	—	May 4, 2014	Haleakala	Pan-STARRS 1	·	1.7 km	MPC · JPL
523182	2016 TV_{99}	—	October 1, 2005	Kitt Peak	Spacewatch	EOS	1.6 km	MPC · JPL
523183	2016 TW_{99}	—	March 27, 2011	Mount Lemmon	Mount Lemmon Survey	·	730 m	MPC · JPL
523184	2016 TY_{99}	—	September 2, 2010	Mount Lemmon	Mount Lemmon Survey	·	3.0 km	MPC · JPL
523185	2016 TC_{100}	—	March 27, 2014	Haleakala	Pan-STARRS 1	HNS	980 m	MPC · JPL
523186	2016 UG_{5}	—	October 18, 2003	Kitt Peak	Spacewatch	H · slow	410 m	MPC · JPL
523187	2016 UJ_{55}	—	September 29, 2008	Mount Lemmon	Mount Lemmon Survey	H	320 m	MPC · JPL
523188	2016 UC_{124}	—	March 6, 2011	Kitt Peak	Spacewatch	·	680 m	MPC · JPL
523189	2016 US_{148}	—	November 19, 2003	Kitt Peak	Spacewatch	·	640 m	MPC · JPL
523190	2016 UV_{148}	—	October 26, 2009	Mount Lemmon	Mount Lemmon Survey	V	560 m	MPC · JPL
523191	2016 UX_{148}	—	February 28, 2009	Kitt Peak	Spacewatch	·	1.8 km	MPC · JPL
523192	2016 UC_{149}	—	October 23, 2006	Kitt Peak	Spacewatch	·	1.6 km	MPC · JPL
523193	2016 UD_{149}	—	October 25, 2011	Kitt Peak	Spacewatch	EOS	1.8 km	MPC · JPL
523194	2016 UE_{149}	—	May 7, 2014	Haleakala	Pan-STARRS 1	EOS	1.9 km	MPC · JPL
523195	2016 UF_{149}	—	December 7, 2012	Mount Lemmon	Mount Lemmon Survey	·	1.6 km	MPC · JPL
523196	2016 UG_{149}	—	August 31, 2005	Kitt Peak	Spacewatch	·	2.0 km	MPC · JPL
523197	2016 UH_{149}	—	September 12, 2015	Haleakala	Pan-STARRS 1	·	2.5 km	MPC · JPL
523198	2016 UL_{149}	—	February 10, 2007	Mount Lemmon	Mount Lemmon Survey	·	2.5 km	MPC · JPL
523199	2016 UM_{149}	—	May 7, 2014	Haleakala	Pan-STARRS 1	·	1.8 km	MPC · JPL
523200	2016 VB_{20}	—	December 31, 2007	Kitt Peak	Spacewatch	·	1.7 km	MPC · JPL

== 523201–523300 ==
back to top

Designation			Discovery			Properties		Ref
Permanent	Provisional	Named after	Date	Site	Discoverer(s)	Category	Diam.	Ref
523201	2016 VC_{20}	—	December 4, 2012	Mount Lemmon	Mount Lemmon Survey	·	1.0 km	MPC · JPL
523202	2016 VE_{20}	—	December 29, 2008	Kitt Peak	Spacewatch	·	1.3 km	MPC · JPL
523203	2016 VF_{20}	—	January 17, 2013	Haleakala	Pan-STARRS 1	·	1.8 km	MPC · JPL
523204	2016 VG_{20}	—	May 6, 2014	Haleakala	Pan-STARRS 1	·	1.1 km	MPC · JPL
523205	2016 VH_{20}	—	August 20, 2015	Kitt Peak	Spacewatch	·	1.6 km	MPC · JPL
523206	2016 VL_{20}	—	February 16, 2012	Haleakala	Pan-STARRS 1	·	2.3 km	MPC · JPL
523207	2016 VM_{20}	—	October 29, 2010	Mount Lemmon	Mount Lemmon Survey	·	2.5 km	MPC · JPL
523208	2016 VP_{20}	—	February 16, 2012	Haleakala	Pan-STARRS 1	·	3.1 km	MPC · JPL
523209	2016 VR_{20}	—	November 14, 2010	Mount Lemmon	Mount Lemmon Survey	·	2.2 km	MPC · JPL
523210	2016 VU_{20}	—	December 29, 2011	Mount Lemmon	Mount Lemmon Survey	·	1.8 km	MPC · JPL
523211	2016 VY_{20}	—	April 26, 2007	Kitt Peak	Spacewatch	·	2.8 km	MPC · JPL
523212	2016 VB_{21}	—	January 20, 2008	Kitt Peak	Spacewatch	·	1.9 km	MPC · JPL
523213	2016 VC_{21}	—	March 6, 2013	Haleakala	Pan-STARRS 1	·	1.8 km	MPC · JPL
523214	2016 VE_{21}	—	October 24, 2011	Haleakala	Pan-STARRS 1	·	1.5 km	MPC · JPL
523215	2016 VF_{21}	—	November 12, 2010	Mount Lemmon	Mount Lemmon Survey	·	2.0 km	MPC · JPL
523216	2016 VM_{21}	—	October 24, 2015	Haleakala	Pan-STARRS 1	BRA	1.4 km	MPC · JPL
523217	2016 VP_{21}	—	February 14, 2013	Haleakala	Pan-STARRS 1	·	2.0 km	MPC · JPL
523218	2016 WF_{11}	—	May 1, 2010	WISE	WISE	·	5.2 km	MPC · JPL
523219	2016 WZ_{26}	—	May 3, 2003	Kitt Peak	Spacewatch	NYS	1.1 km	MPC · JPL
523220	2016 WW_{33}	—	February 12, 1999	Kitt Peak	Spacewatch	·	1.1 km	MPC · JPL
523221	2016 WY_{45}	—	May 6, 2014	Haleakala	Pan-STARRS 1	EUN	1.1 km	MPC · JPL
523222	2016 WR_{53}	—	November 19, 2003	Kitt Peak	Spacewatch	·	1.5 km	MPC · JPL
523223	2016 WJ_{57}	—	January 27, 2007	Mount Lemmon	Mount Lemmon Survey	·	2.7 km	MPC · JPL
523224	2016 WK_{57}	—	February 26, 2014	Haleakala	Pan-STARRS 1	·	1.5 km	MPC · JPL
523225	2016 XO_{2}	—	May 12, 2010	Siding Spring	SSS	RAF	1.1 km	MPC · JPL
523226	2016 XQ_{4}	—	September 7, 2008	Mount Lemmon	Mount Lemmon Survey	·	1.4 km	MPC · JPL
523227	2016 XC_{14}	—	November 20, 2003	Kitt Peak	Spacewatch	MAR	1.4 km	MPC · JPL
523228	2016 XX_{24}	—	September 26, 2011	Haleakala	Pan-STARRS 1	·	1.5 km	MPC · JPL
523229	2016 XY_{24}	—	November 28, 2005	Kitt Peak	Spacewatch	·	4.3 km	MPC · JPL
523230	2016 YZ_{4}	—	May 25, 2014	Haleakala	Pan-STARRS 1	·	2.8 km	MPC · JPL
523231	2016 YF_{12}	—	April 14, 2007	Kitt Peak	Spacewatch	·	2.5 km	MPC · JPL
523232	2016 YO_{13}	—	October 10, 2007	Mount Lemmon	Mount Lemmon Survey	MAR	780 m	MPC · JPL
523233	2016 YQ_{13}	—	September 19, 2009	Mount Lemmon	Mount Lemmon Survey	·	2.1 km	MPC · JPL
523234	2016 YU_{13}	—	April 4, 2005	Mount Lemmon	Mount Lemmon Survey	·	1.7 km	MPC · JPL
523235	2016 YY_{13}	—	October 24, 2011	Haleakala	Pan-STARRS 1	·	1.8 km	MPC · JPL
523236	2016 YZ_{13}	—	September 10, 2015	Haleakala	Pan-STARRS 1	EUP	2.6 km	MPC · JPL
523237	2016 YA_{14}	—	January 29, 2012	Kitt Peak	Spacewatch	VER	2.6 km	MPC · JPL
523238	2016 YD_{14}	—	October 7, 2004	Kitt Peak	Spacewatch	EOS	1.6 km	MPC · JPL
523239	2016 YE_{14}	—	March 16, 2009	Mount Lemmon	Mount Lemmon Survey	EUN	920 m	MPC · JPL
523240	2016 YF_{14}	—	February 26, 2008	Mount Lemmon	Mount Lemmon Survey	·	1.7 km	MPC · JPL
523241	2016 YH_{14}	—	June 5, 2014	Haleakala	Pan-STARRS 1	·	1.4 km	MPC · JPL
523242	2017 AF_{1}	—	June 7, 2014	Haleakala	Pan-STARRS 1	·	1.5 km	MPC · JPL
523243	2017 AW_{5}	—	October 23, 2004	Kitt Peak	Spacewatch	·	1.5 km	MPC · JPL
523244	2017 AG_{8}	—	January 22, 2012	Haleakala	Pan-STARRS 1	·	2.6 km	MPC · JPL
523245	2017 AJ_{8}	—	March 26, 2009	Kitt Peak	Spacewatch	·	1.8 km	MPC · JPL
523246	2017 AM_{10}	—	October 20, 2015	XuYi	PMO NEO Survey Program	·	2.1 km	MPC · JPL
523247	2017 AZ_{12}	—	November 20, 2003	Palomar	NEAT	·	1.7 km	MPC · JPL
523248	2017 AB_{22}	—	August 20, 2014	Haleakala	Pan-STARRS 1	·	1.3 km	MPC · JPL
523249	2017 AH_{22}	—	March 12, 2007	Kitt Peak	Spacewatch	·	1.8 km	MPC · JPL
523250	2017 AK_{22}	—	September 30, 2009	Mount Lemmon	Mount Lemmon Survey	·	3.4 km	MPC · JPL
523251	2017 AO_{22}	—	September 21, 2009	Catalina	CSS	EOS	2.0 km	MPC · JPL
523252	2017 AQ_{22}	—	October 24, 2009	Kitt Peak	Spacewatch	HYG	2.7 km	MPC · JPL
523253	2017 AR_{22}	—	December 4, 2005	Kitt Peak	Spacewatch	EOS	1.6 km	MPC · JPL
523254	2017 AU_{22}	—	July 1, 2014	Haleakala	Pan-STARRS 1	EOS	1.8 km	MPC · JPL
523255	2017 AY_{22}	—	December 20, 2007	Kitt Peak	Spacewatch	·	1.4 km	MPC · JPL
523256	2017 AC_{23}	—	October 20, 1995	Kitt Peak	Spacewatch	·	910 m	MPC · JPL
523257	2017 AD_{23}	—	October 26, 2009	Kitt Peak	Spacewatch	·	2.4 km	MPC · JPL
523258	2017 AE_{23}	—	March 31, 2008	Mount Lemmon	Mount Lemmon Survey	·	1.9 km	MPC · JPL
523259	2017 AJ_{23}	—	April 16, 2012	Haleakala	Pan-STARRS 1	·	2.7 km	MPC · JPL
523260	2017 AO_{23}	—	April 1, 2013	Mount Lemmon	Mount Lemmon Survey	JUN	790 m	MPC · JPL
523261	2017 AQ_{23}	—	January 18, 2012	Mount Lemmon	Mount Lemmon Survey	·	1.8 km	MPC · JPL
523262	2017 AT_{23}	—	January 15, 2008	Mount Lemmon	Mount Lemmon Survey	·	1.5 km	MPC · JPL
523263	2017 AV_{23}	—	January 25, 2006	Kitt Peak	Spacewatch	·	2.5 km	MPC · JPL
523264	2017 AW_{23}	—	January 20, 2012	Kitt Peak	Spacewatch	·	1.9 km	MPC · JPL
523265	2017 AB_{24}	—	September 30, 2010	Mount Lemmon	Mount Lemmon Survey	·	2.0 km	MPC · JPL
523266	2017 AC_{24}	—	November 25, 2005	Kitt Peak	Spacewatch	·	710 m	MPC · JPL
523267	2017 AJ_{24}	—	June 4, 2014	Haleakala	Pan-STARRS 1	·	1.5 km	MPC · JPL
523268	2017 AL_{24}	—	February 20, 2012	Haleakala	Pan-STARRS 1	·	2.1 km	MPC · JPL
523269	2017 AO_{24}	—	December 14, 2010	Mount Lemmon	Mount Lemmon Survey	·	2.4 km	MPC · JPL
523270	2017 AP_{24}	—	May 8, 2013	Haleakala	Pan-STARRS 1	ADE	1.3 km	MPC · JPL
523271	2017 AR_{24}	—	September 3, 2014	Mount Lemmon	Mount Lemmon Survey	·	1.6 km	MPC · JPL
523272	2017 AW_{24}	—	November 9, 2007	Kitt Peak	Spacewatch	·	1.1 km	MPC · JPL
523273	2017 AX_{24}	—	September 2, 2010	Mount Lemmon	Mount Lemmon Survey	EUN	1.1 km	MPC · JPL
523274	2017 AZ_{24}	—	March 13, 2013	Mount Lemmon	Mount Lemmon Survey	AEO	930 m	MPC · JPL
523275	2017 BB_{1}	—	October 31, 2011	Kitt Peak	Spacewatch	AEO	1.1 km	MPC · JPL
523276	2017 BE_{8}	—	December 30, 2005	Mount Lemmon	Mount Lemmon Survey	·	3.0 km	MPC · JPL
523277	2017 BO_{10}	—	January 8, 2006	Kitt Peak	Spacewatch	THM	2.1 km	MPC · JPL
523278	2017 BM_{11}	—	September 26, 2009	Kitt Peak	Spacewatch	·	2.7 km	MPC · JPL
523279	2017 BG_{16}	—	January 9, 2006	Kitt Peak	Spacewatch	·	1.8 km	MPC · JPL
523280	2017 BY_{18}	—	December 25, 2005	Kitt Peak	Spacewatch	EOS	2.4 km	MPC · JPL
523281	2017 BY_{19}	—	January 3, 2013	Mount Lemmon	Mount Lemmon Survey	·	1.3 km	MPC · JPL
523282	2017 BR_{25}	—	October 13, 2007	Mount Lemmon	Mount Lemmon Survey	·	1.4 km	MPC · JPL
523283	2017 BP_{28}	—	May 31, 2014	Haleakala	Pan-STARRS 1	·	2.0 km	MPC · JPL
523284	2017 BM_{34}	—	March 25, 2012	Mount Lemmon	Mount Lemmon Survey	·	2.8 km	MPC · JPL
523285	2017 BW_{36}	—	January 20, 2008	Kitt Peak	Spacewatch	·	1.8 km	MPC · JPL
523286	2017 BX_{37}	—	December 19, 2007	Mount Lemmon	Mount Lemmon Survey	·	1.7 km	MPC · JPL
523287	2017 BE_{39}	—	March 24, 2014	Haleakala	Pan-STARRS 1	·	1 km	MPC · JPL
523288	2017 BE_{40}	—	October 12, 2015	Haleakala	Pan-STARRS 1	TIR	2.3 km	MPC · JPL
523289	2017 BJ_{48}	—	January 8, 2006	Kitt Peak	Spacewatch	EOS	1.6 km	MPC · JPL
523290	2017 BT_{48}	—	November 3, 2011	Mount Lemmon	Mount Lemmon Survey	·	1.5 km	MPC · JPL
523291	2017 BD_{62}	—	October 11, 2010	Mount Lemmon	Mount Lemmon Survey	·	1.6 km	MPC · JPL
523292	2017 BC_{64}	—	October 10, 2007	Mount Lemmon	Mount Lemmon Survey	·	1.2 km	MPC · JPL
523293	2017 BY_{67}	—	October 26, 2011	Haleakala	Pan-STARRS 1	·	1.6 km	MPC · JPL
523294	2017 BB_{80}	—	June 14, 2004	Kitt Peak	Spacewatch	·	2.2 km	MPC · JPL
523295	2017 BP_{80}	—	July 12, 2005	Kitt Peak	Spacewatch	HOF	2.2 km	MPC · JPL
523296	2017 BG_{82}	—	November 26, 2005	Kitt Peak	Spacewatch	·	1.9 km	MPC · JPL
523297	2017 BK_{82}	—	December 9, 2010	Mount Lemmon	Mount Lemmon Survey	·	2.8 km	MPC · JPL
523298	2017 BJ_{84}	—	September 30, 2009	Mount Lemmon	Mount Lemmon Survey	·	3.5 km	MPC · JPL
523299	2017 BW_{84}	—	March 8, 2008	Kitt Peak	Spacewatch	·	1.9 km	MPC · JPL
523300	2017 BE_{100}	—	October 19, 2006	Mount Lemmon	Mount Lemmon Survey	AGN	1.3 km	MPC · JPL

== 523301–523400 ==
back to top

Designation			Discovery			Properties		Ref
Permanent	Provisional	Named after	Date	Site	Discoverer(s)	Category	Diam.	Ref
523301	2017 BA_{104}	—	April 20, 2007	Kitt Peak	Spacewatch	·	2.7 km	MPC · JPL
523302	2017 BN_{104}	—	February 21, 2009	Catalina	CSS	·	1.6 km	MPC · JPL
523303	2017 BZ_{104}	—	December 8, 2012	Mount Lemmon	Mount Lemmon Survey	·	1.4 km	MPC · JPL
523304	2017 BH_{105}	—	December 19, 2003	Kitt Peak	Spacewatch	·	2.0 km	MPC · JPL
523305	2017 BZ_{105}	—	June 20, 2015	Haleakala	Pan-STARRS 1	PHO	820 m	MPC · JPL
523306	2017 BC_{106}	—	May 7, 2014	Haleakala	Pan-STARRS 1	·	1.2 km	MPC · JPL
523307	2017 BS_{109}	—	September 29, 2009	Mount Lemmon	Mount Lemmon Survey	·	3.2 km	MPC · JPL
523308	2017 BD_{111}	—	December 27, 2005	Mount Lemmon	Mount Lemmon Survey	EOS	1.7 km	MPC · JPL
523309	2017 BH_{111}	—	March 16, 2012	Kitt Peak	Spacewatch	·	3.0 km	MPC · JPL
523310	2017 BE_{116}	—	December 9, 2004	Kitt Peak	Spacewatch	·	3.6 km	MPC · JPL
523311	2017 BD_{121}	—	August 28, 2014	Haleakala	Pan-STARRS 1	·	3.2 km	MPC · JPL
523312	2017 BF_{124}	—	December 1, 2005	Kitt Peak	Spacewatch	·	2.2 km	MPC · JPL
523313	2017 BH_{126}	—	February 14, 2013	Haleakala	Pan-STARRS 1	·	1.3 km	MPC · JPL
523314	2017 BA_{127}	—	October 27, 2006	Mount Lemmon	Mount Lemmon Survey	HOF	2.3 km	MPC · JPL
523315	2017 BB_{128}	—	February 2, 2006	Kitt Peak	Spacewatch	·	2.6 km	MPC · JPL
523316	2017 BU_{132}	—	March 12, 2013	Kitt Peak	Spacewatch	·	1.5 km	MPC · JPL
523317	2017 BX_{136}	—	August 20, 2014	Haleakala	Pan-STARRS 1	EOS	1.6 km	MPC · JPL
523318	2017 BG_{137}	—	July 13, 2013	Mount Lemmon	Mount Lemmon Survey	·	2.7 km	MPC · JPL
523319	2017 BV_{137}	—	October 14, 2009	Mount Lemmon	Mount Lemmon Survey	·	2.8 km	MPC · JPL
523320	2017 BG_{138}	—	November 30, 2011	Mount Lemmon	Mount Lemmon Survey	·	1.4 km	MPC · JPL
523321	2017 BJ_{138}	—	September 17, 2006	Kitt Peak	Spacewatch	·	1.3 km	MPC · JPL
523322	2017 BL_{138}	—	August 31, 2005	Kitt Peak	Spacewatch	·	2.0 km	MPC · JPL
523323	2017 BO_{138}	—	November 30, 2010	Mount Lemmon	Mount Lemmon Survey	TEL	1.3 km	MPC · JPL
523324	2017 BQ_{138}	—	May 31, 2014	Haleakala	Pan-STARRS 1	EOS	2.1 km	MPC · JPL
523325	2017 BT_{138}	—	January 28, 2006	Mount Lemmon	Mount Lemmon Survey	EOS	1.9 km	MPC · JPL
523326	2017 BW_{138}	—	April 13, 2013	Haleakala	Pan-STARRS 1	·	1.2 km	MPC · JPL
523327	2017 BX_{138}	—	December 1, 2010	Kitt Peak	Spacewatch	·	2.8 km	MPC · JPL
523328	2017 BY_{138}	—	September 6, 2008	Mount Lemmon	Mount Lemmon Survey	·	780 m	MPC · JPL
523329	2017 BZ_{138}	—	September 16, 2010	Kitt Peak	Spacewatch	·	1.7 km	MPC · JPL
523330	2017 BB_{139}	—	March 26, 2007	Kitt Peak	Spacewatch	·	1.6 km	MPC · JPL
523331	2017 BE_{139}	—	October 2, 2010	Mount Lemmon	Mount Lemmon Survey	·	1.9 km	MPC · JPL
523332	2017 BF_{139}	—	November 1, 2010	Kitt Peak	Spacewatch	KOR	1.1 km	MPC · JPL
523333	2017 BH_{139}	—	January 5, 2006	Mount Lemmon	Mount Lemmon Survey	·	1.1 km	MPC · JPL
523334	2017 BO_{139}	—	February 8, 2011	Mount Lemmon	Mount Lemmon Survey	VER	2.5 km	MPC · JPL
523335	2017 BU_{139}	—	September 11, 2005	Kitt Peak	Spacewatch	·	1.6 km	MPC · JPL
523336	2017 BV_{139}	—	January 11, 2008	Mount Lemmon	Mount Lemmon Survey	·	1.2 km	MPC · JPL
523337	2017 BX_{139}	—	September 5, 2008	Kitt Peak	Spacewatch	·	2.9 km	MPC · JPL
523338	2017 BY_{139}	—	December 2, 2010	Kitt Peak	Spacewatch	EOS	1.9 km	MPC · JPL
523339	2017 BC_{140}	—	January 17, 2005	Kitt Peak	Spacewatch	·	1.3 km	MPC · JPL
523340	2017 BL_{140}	—	November 8, 2007	Kitt Peak	Spacewatch	·	1.2 km	MPC · JPL
523341	2017 BN_{140}	—	October 30, 2009	Mount Lemmon	Mount Lemmon Survey	EOS	1.9 km	MPC · JPL
523342	2017 BO_{140}	—	September 11, 2010	Mount Lemmon	Mount Lemmon Survey	·	2.1 km	MPC · JPL
523343	2017 BS_{140}	—	March 9, 2008	Kitt Peak	Spacewatch	·	1.7 km	MPC · JPL
523344	2017 BT_{140}	—	October 6, 2005	Kitt Peak	Spacewatch	·	1.9 km	MPC · JPL
523345	2017 BV_{140}	—	January 24, 2012	Haleakala	Pan-STARRS 1	·	1.9 km	MPC · JPL
523346	2017 BW_{140}	—	October 9, 2015	Haleakala	Pan-STARRS 1	·	830 m	MPC · JPL
523347	2017 BD_{141}	—	February 9, 2005	Mount Lemmon	Mount Lemmon Survey	·	3.1 km	MPC · JPL
523348	2017 BE_{141}	—	November 10, 2010	Mount Lemmon	Mount Lemmon Survey	·	1.6 km	MPC · JPL
523349	2017 BF_{141}	—	January 19, 2005	Kitt Peak	Spacewatch	EOS	2.0 km	MPC · JPL
523350	2017 BL_{141}	—	March 15, 2012	Kitt Peak	Spacewatch	·	2.9 km	MPC · JPL
523351	2017 BQ_{141}	—	February 10, 2011	Mount Lemmon	Mount Lemmon Survey	·	3.3 km	MPC · JPL
523352	2017 CK_{2}	—	November 1, 2010	Mount Lemmon	Mount Lemmon Survey	·	2.1 km	MPC · JPL
523353	2017 CB_{3}	—	February 12, 2008	Mount Lemmon	Mount Lemmon Survey	AGN	1.3 km	MPC · JPL
523354	2017 CT_{3}	—	September 27, 2012	Haleakala	Pan-STARRS 1	·	1.5 km	MPC · JPL
523355	2017 CJ_{6}	—	October 11, 2010	Mount Lemmon	Mount Lemmon Survey	·	1.7 km	MPC · JPL
523356	2017 CR_{6}	—	December 14, 2010	Mount Lemmon	Mount Lemmon Survey	·	2.9 km	MPC · JPL
523357	2017 CS_{6}	—	December 8, 2015	Haleakala	Pan-STARRS 1	·	2.8 km	MPC · JPL
523358	2017 CT_{7}	—	July 31, 2014	Haleakala	Pan-STARRS 1	·	1.9 km	MPC · JPL
523359	2017 CE_{9}	—	October 21, 2015	Haleakala	Pan-STARRS 1	·	2.5 km	MPC · JPL
523360	2017 CV_{11}	—	October 26, 2011	Kitt Peak	Spacewatch	EUN	1.2 km	MPC · JPL
523361	2017 CS_{20}	—	January 30, 2004	Kitt Peak	Spacewatch	·	2.5 km	MPC · JPL
523362	2017 CA_{28}	—	September 19, 2006	Kitt Peak	Spacewatch	(12739)	1.5 km	MPC · JPL
523363	2017 CC_{33}	—	February 12, 2008	Kitt Peak	Spacewatch	·	2.3 km	MPC · JPL
523364	2017 CE_{33}	—	September 25, 2011	Haleakala	Pan-STARRS 1	·	1 km	MPC · JPL
523365	2017 CE_{34}	—	February 13, 2010	WISE	WISE	·	5.1 km	MPC · JPL
523366	2017 CO_{34}	—	October 22, 2009	Mount Lemmon	Mount Lemmon Survey	·	2.6 km	MPC · JPL
523367	2017 CU_{34}	—	April 25, 2007	Kitt Peak	Spacewatch	·	2.5 km	MPC · JPL
523368	2017 CW_{34}	—	October 25, 2005	Mount Lemmon	Mount Lemmon Survey	(18466)	2.1 km	MPC · JPL
523369	2017 CZ_{34}	—	January 25, 2007	Kitt Peak	Spacewatch	HOF	2.7 km	MPC · JPL
523370	2017 CD_{35}	—	September 20, 2011	Kitt Peak	Spacewatch	V	610 m	MPC · JPL
523371	2017 CQ_{35}	—	January 7, 2006	Kitt Peak	Spacewatch	·	1.9 km	MPC · JPL
523372	2017 CR_{35}	—	January 19, 2012	Kitt Peak	Spacewatch	·	1.8 km	MPC · JPL
523373	2017 CU_{35}	—	October 21, 2009	Mount Lemmon	Mount Lemmon Survey	·	3.1 km	MPC · JPL
523374	2017 DH_{1}	—	April 11, 2008	Mount Lemmon	Mount Lemmon Survey	·	2.2 km	MPC · JPL
523375	2017 DC_{2}	—	November 25, 2011	Haleakala	Pan-STARRS 1	·	1.2 km	MPC · JPL
523376	2017 DJ_{2}	—	November 21, 2005	Kitt Peak	Spacewatch	·	1.5 km	MPC · JPL
523377	2017 DN_{2}	—	January 30, 2012	Kitt Peak	Spacewatch	·	1.9 km	MPC · JPL
523378	2017 DS_{5}	—	January 21, 2012	Kitt Peak	Spacewatch	·	1.9 km	MPC · JPL
523379	2017 DV_{5}	—	January 13, 2008	Mount Lemmon	Mount Lemmon Survey	·	2.0 km	MPC · JPL
523380	2017 DB_{12}	—	October 18, 2006	Kitt Peak	Spacewatch	·	2.0 km	MPC · JPL
523381	2017 DF_{13}	—	September 2, 2014	Haleakala	Pan-STARRS 1	·	2.0 km	MPC · JPL
523382	2017 DA_{17}	—	April 8, 2002	Kitt Peak	Spacewatch	·	2.1 km	MPC · JPL
523383	2017 DE_{23}	—	March 19, 2013	Haleakala	Pan-STARRS 1	·	1.4 km	MPC · JPL
523384	2017 DL_{26}	—	December 31, 2007	Kitt Peak	Spacewatch	·	1.5 km	MPC · JPL
523385	2017 DF_{28}	—	August 29, 2005	Kitt Peak	Spacewatch	AGN	1.2 km	MPC · JPL
523386	2017 DQ_{39}	—	March 14, 2012	Mount Lemmon	Mount Lemmon Survey	·	2.8 km	MPC · JPL
523387	2017 DY_{41}	—	January 9, 2006	Kitt Peak	Spacewatch	·	2.5 km	MPC · JPL
523388	2017 DW_{44}	—	September 25, 2009	Kitt Peak	Spacewatch	·	2.8 km	MPC · JPL
523389	2017 DD_{47}	—	January 24, 2011	Kitt Peak	Spacewatch	·	2.7 km	MPC · JPL
523390	2017 DN_{51}	—	May 10, 2007	Anderson Mesa	LONEOS	·	3.4 km	MPC · JPL
523391	2017 DC_{56}	—	April 20, 2007	Kitt Peak	Spacewatch	·	2.7 km	MPC · JPL
523392	2017 DK_{58}	—	January 4, 2011	Mount Lemmon	Mount Lemmon Survey	EOS	2.1 km	MPC · JPL
523393	2017 DZ_{61}	—	January 27, 2011	Mount Lemmon	Mount Lemmon Survey	·	2.6 km	MPC · JPL
523394	2017 DL_{62}	—	October 14, 2009	Mount Lemmon	Mount Lemmon Survey	·	3.3 km	MPC · JPL
523395	2017 DS_{65}	—	May 11, 2005	Mount Lemmon	Mount Lemmon Survey	·	1.3 km	MPC · JPL
523396	2017 DA_{80}	—	March 4, 2006	Kitt Peak	Spacewatch	·	3.8 km	MPC · JPL
523397	2017 DA_{83}	—	April 23, 2007	Mount Lemmon	Mount Lemmon Survey	·	2.6 km	MPC · JPL
523398	2017 DX_{84}	—	February 5, 2000	Kitt Peak	Spacewatch	·	2.9 km	MPC · JPL
523399	2017 DH_{100}	—	February 3, 2012	Haleakala	Pan-STARRS 1	TIN	1.0 km	MPC · JPL
523400	2017 DX_{104}	—	October 9, 2004	Tucson	R. A. Tucker	·	2.4 km	MPC · JPL

== 523401–523500 ==
back to top

Designation			Discovery			Properties		Ref
Permanent	Provisional	Named after	Date	Site	Discoverer(s)	Category	Diam.	Ref
523401	2017 DU_{109}	—	October 9, 2004	Kitt Peak	Spacewatch	LIX	3.4 km	MPC · JPL
523402	2017 DU_{113}	—	April 10, 2002	Socorro	LINEAR	·	2.4 km	MPC · JPL
523403	2017 DL_{114}	—	September 19, 2003	Kitt Peak	Spacewatch	·	3.3 km	MPC · JPL
523404	2017 DB_{116}	—	March 4, 2013	Haleakala	Pan-STARRS 1	HNS	1.3 km	MPC · JPL
523405	2017 DC_{116}	—	July 18, 2010	WISE	WISE	·	3.6 km	MPC · JPL
523406	2017 DL_{118}	—	September 4, 2010	Mount Lemmon	Mount Lemmon Survey	EUN	1.3 km	MPC · JPL
523407	2017 DG_{121}	—	February 10, 2011	Mount Lemmon	Mount Lemmon Survey	·	3.4 km	MPC · JPL
523408	2017 DV_{121}	—	June 28, 2014	Kitt Peak	Spacewatch	EOS	1.4 km	MPC · JPL
523409	2017 DZ_{121}	—	March 24, 2012	Kitt Peak	Spacewatch	·	2.2 km	MPC · JPL
523410	2017 DD_{122}	—	March 14, 2007	Kitt Peak	Spacewatch	·	1.6 km	MPC · JPL
523411	2017 DE_{122}	—	February 3, 2012	Haleakala	Pan-STARRS 1	AGN	1.1 km	MPC · JPL
523412	2017 DJ_{122}	—	September 2, 2008	Kitt Peak	Spacewatch	·	2.5 km	MPC · JPL
523413	2017 DN_{122}	—	August 23, 2014	Haleakala	Pan-STARRS 1	·	2.5 km	MPC · JPL
523414	2017 DQ_{122}	—	September 20, 2014	Catalina	CSS	EOS	1.9 km	MPC · JPL
523415	2017 DR_{122}	—	February 4, 2012	Haleakala	Pan-STARRS 1	·	1.9 km	MPC · JPL
523416	2017 DU_{122}	—	October 16, 2003	Kitt Peak	Spacewatch	·	3.0 km	MPC · JPL
523417	2017 DW_{122}	—	October 25, 2011	Haleakala	Pan-STARRS 1	·	1.6 km	MPC · JPL
523418	2017 DX_{122}	—	November 30, 2005	Kitt Peak	Spacewatch	NAE	2.7 km	MPC · JPL
523419	2017 DZ_{122}	—	April 26, 2000	Kitt Peak	Spacewatch	·	3.0 km	MPC · JPL
523420	2017 EP_{4}	—	September 18, 2003	Kitt Peak	Spacewatch	·	3.3 km	MPC · JPL
523421	2017 EC_{5}	—	November 18, 2011	Mount Lemmon	Mount Lemmon Survey	·	1.4 km	MPC · JPL
523422	2017 EW_{5}	—	September 15, 2009	Kitt Peak	Spacewatch	TIR	3.1 km	MPC · JPL
523423	2017 EE_{12}	—	December 10, 2004	Kitt Peak	Spacewatch	·	4.4 km	MPC · JPL
523424	2017 EE_{13}	—	January 31, 2006	Kitt Peak	Spacewatch	·	2.6 km	MPC · JPL
523425	2017 EW_{13}	—	July 1, 2008	Kitt Peak	Spacewatch	EOS	2.5 km	MPC · JPL
523426	2017 EE_{14}	—	January 26, 2011	Kitt Peak	Spacewatch	URS	3.1 km	MPC · JPL
523427	2017 EH_{19}	—	January 8, 2011	Mount Lemmon	Mount Lemmon Survey	·	3.2 km	MPC · JPL
523428	2017 EH_{24}	—	April 10, 2013	Haleakala	Pan-STARRS 1	EUN	1.2 km	MPC · JPL
523429	2017 EJ_{24}	—	October 28, 2014	Haleakala	Pan-STARRS 1	·	3.6 km	MPC · JPL
523430	2017 EK_{24}	—	March 26, 2007	Kitt Peak	Spacewatch	·	1.5 km	MPC · JPL
523431	2017 EL_{24}	—	October 19, 2011	Kitt Peak	Spacewatch	·	1.1 km	MPC · JPL
523432	2017 ES_{24}	—	November 30, 2011	Kitt Peak	Spacewatch	·	1.4 km	MPC · JPL
523433	2017 ET_{24}	—	April 13, 2008	Mount Lemmon	Mount Lemmon Survey	·	2.4 km	MPC · JPL
523434	2017 EW_{24}	—	January 27, 2007	Kitt Peak	Spacewatch	(13314)	1.9 km	MPC · JPL
523435	2017 EZ_{24}	—	July 14, 2013	Haleakala	Pan-STARRS 1	DOR	1.9 km	MPC · JPL
523436	2017 EE_{25}	—	April 28, 2008	Kitt Peak	Spacewatch	PAD	1.6 km	MPC · JPL
523437	2017 EF_{25}	—	February 26, 2011	Mount Lemmon	Mount Lemmon Survey	·	2.4 km	MPC · JPL
523438	2017 EG_{25}	—	February 5, 2011	Haleakala	Pan-STARRS 1	EOS	1.7 km	MPC · JPL
523439	2017 EH_{25}	—	November 8, 2010	Kitt Peak	Spacewatch	·	1.6 km	MPC · JPL
523440	2017 EJ_{25}	—	April 29, 2003	Kitt Peak	Spacewatch	DOR	2.3 km	MPC · JPL
523441	2017 FM_{5}	—	September 21, 2009	Mount Lemmon	Mount Lemmon Survey	·	1.9 km	MPC · JPL
523442	2017 FL_{7}	—	December 14, 2010	Mount Lemmon	Mount Lemmon Survey	THM	1.7 km	MPC · JPL
523443	2017 FE_{9}	—	January 30, 2012	Kitt Peak	Spacewatch	·	1.6 km	MPC · JPL
523444	2017 FJ_{9}	—	February 8, 2011	Mount Lemmon	Mount Lemmon Survey	slow	3.0 km	MPC · JPL
523445	2017 FV_{10}	—	March 16, 2007	Mount Lemmon	Mount Lemmon Survey	·	1.6 km	MPC · JPL
523446	2017 FK_{11}	—	September 7, 2008	Mount Lemmon	Mount Lemmon Survey	·	2.8 km	MPC · JPL
523447	2017 FZ_{14}	—	February 23, 2012	Mount Lemmon	Mount Lemmon Survey	KOR	1.0 km	MPC · JPL
523448	2017 FR_{24}	—	August 29, 2006	Kitt Peak	Spacewatch	·	980 m	MPC · JPL
523449	2017 FX_{24}	—	August 3, 2011	Haleakala	Pan-STARRS 1	3:2	4.9 km	MPC · JPL
523450	2017 FO_{42}	—	March 26, 2010	WISE	WISE	·	3.6 km	MPC · JPL
523451	2017 FE_{58}	—	May 8, 2013	Haleakala	Pan-STARRS 1	·	1.5 km	MPC · JPL
523452	2017 FQ_{58}	—	November 2, 2007	Kitt Peak	Spacewatch	·	1.2 km	MPC · JPL
523453	2017 FU_{58}	—	February 10, 2010	WISE	WISE	·	3.9 km	MPC · JPL
523454	2017 FH_{68}	—	September 29, 2009	Mount Lemmon	Mount Lemmon Survey	EOS	1.9 km	MPC · JPL
523455	2017 FM_{68}	—	May 12, 2013	Mount Lemmon	Mount Lemmon Survey	NAE	2.8 km	MPC · JPL
523456	2017 FC_{69}	—	February 7, 2010	WISE	WISE	·	5.8 km	MPC · JPL
523457	2017 FR_{75}	—	January 30, 2010	WISE	WISE	·	3.7 km	MPC · JPL
523458	2017 FX_{79}	—	May 18, 2012	Haleakala	Pan-STARRS 1	·	2.9 km	MPC · JPL
523459	2017 FN_{83}	—	September 7, 2008	Catalina	CSS	·	4.6 km	MPC · JPL
523460	2017 FU_{84}	—	October 24, 2009	Mount Lemmon	Mount Lemmon Survey	·	3.1 km	MPC · JPL
523461	2017 FM_{85}	—	May 7, 2005	Mount Lemmon	Mount Lemmon Survey	CYB	4.4 km	MPC · JPL
523462	2017 FT_{92}	—	May 31, 2014	Haleakala	Pan-STARRS 1	·	1.8 km	MPC · JPL
523463	2017 FG_{94}	—	March 27, 2012	Mount Lemmon	Mount Lemmon Survey	·	2.1 km	MPC · JPL
523464	2017 FK_{104}	—	July 29, 2008	Kitt Peak	Spacewatch	·	4.4 km	MPC · JPL
523465	2017 FD_{107}	—	October 1, 2009	Mount Lemmon	Mount Lemmon Survey	·	3.9 km	MPC · JPL
523466	2017 FX_{107}	—	October 28, 2010	Mount Lemmon	Mount Lemmon Survey	·	1.7 km	MPC · JPL
523467	2017 FX_{117}	—	March 16, 2007	Kitt Peak	Spacewatch	·	1.3 km	MPC · JPL
523468	2017 FK_{120}	—	November 11, 2004	Kitt Peak	Spacewatch	EOS	2.4 km	MPC · JPL
523469	2017 FP_{126}	—	August 8, 2010	WISE	WISE	·	2.4 km	MPC · JPL
523470	2017 FA_{162}	—	November 1, 2010	Mount Lemmon	Mount Lemmon Survey	·	1.3 km	MPC · JPL
523471	2017 FB_{162}	—	May 18, 2013	Mount Lemmon	Mount Lemmon Survey	·	1.3 km	MPC · JPL
523472	2017 FJ_{162}	—	March 10, 2008	Kitt Peak	Spacewatch	(12739)	1.5 km	MPC · JPL
523473	2017 FK_{162}	—	February 27, 2006	Kitt Peak	Spacewatch	·	2.2 km	MPC · JPL
523474	2017 FL_{162}	—	March 24, 2006	Mount Lemmon	Mount Lemmon Survey	·	3.0 km	MPC · JPL
523475	2017 FM_{162}	—	September 18, 2010	Mount Lemmon	Mount Lemmon Survey	·	1.5 km	MPC · JPL
523476	2017 FO_{162}	—	January 30, 2011	Mount Lemmon	Mount Lemmon Survey	·	2.1 km	MPC · JPL
523477	2017 FQ_{162}	—	March 29, 2011	Mount Lemmon	Mount Lemmon Survey	·	3.2 km	MPC · JPL
523478	2017 FR_{162}	—	March 30, 2011	Haleakala	Pan-STARRS 1	TIR	2.7 km	MPC · JPL
523479	2017 FS_{162}	—	September 25, 2006	Catalina	CSS	·	1.8 km	MPC · JPL
523480	2017 FT_{162}	—	September 27, 2009	Kitt Peak	Spacewatch	·	1.6 km	MPC · JPL
523481	2017 FU_{162}	—	September 14, 2013	Haleakala	Pan-STARRS 1	·	2.7 km	MPC · JPL
523482	2017 FW_{162}	—	October 3, 2010	Kitt Peak	Spacewatch	·	1.5 km	MPC · JPL
523483	2017 FX_{162}	—	May 29, 2012	Mount Lemmon	Mount Lemmon Survey	·	1.9 km	MPC · JPL
523484	2017 GG_{3}	—	February 5, 2011	Haleakala	Pan-STARRS 1	·	2.3 km	MPC · JPL
523485	2017 GV_{9}	—	September 28, 2006	Mount Lemmon	Mount Lemmon Survey	·	1.8 km	MPC · JPL
523486	2017 GY_{9}	—	September 6, 2013	Kitt Peak	Spacewatch	·	2.2 km	MPC · JPL
523487	2017 GF_{10}	—	April 29, 2008	Mount Lemmon	Mount Lemmon Survey	·	1.6 km	MPC · JPL
523488	2017 GL_{10}	—	March 26, 2011	Mount Lemmon	Mount Lemmon Survey	·	2.7 km	MPC · JPL
523489	2017 GM_{10}	—	October 31, 2008	Kitt Peak	Spacewatch	VER	3.2 km	MPC · JPL
523490	2017 GR_{10}	—	February 19, 2012	Kitt Peak	Spacewatch	·	2.3 km	MPC · JPL
523491	2017 GV_{10}	—	September 4, 2007	Catalina	CSS	·	3.7 km	MPC · JPL
523492	2017 HQ_{8}	—	January 30, 2006	Kitt Peak	Spacewatch	·	2.0 km	MPC · JPL
523493	2017 HM_{16}	—	May 6, 2006	Mount Lemmon	Mount Lemmon Survey	·	2.8 km	MPC · JPL
523494	2017 HQ_{23}	—	November 23, 2006	Kitt Peak	Spacewatch	·	2.0 km	MPC · JPL
523495	2017 HE_{25}	—	October 6, 1996	Kitt Peak	Spacewatch	ELF	4.1 km	MPC · JPL
523496	2017 HX_{40}	—	March 23, 2012	Mount Lemmon	Mount Lemmon Survey	·	1.7 km	MPC · JPL
523497	2017 HG_{62}	—	June 18, 2006	Kitt Peak	Spacewatch	·	1.9 km	MPC · JPL
523498	2017 HH_{62}	—	February 8, 2011	Mount Lemmon	Mount Lemmon Survey	·	1.8 km	MPC · JPL
523499	2017 HJ_{62}	—	November 11, 2010	Mount Lemmon	Mount Lemmon Survey	·	1.3 km	MPC · JPL
523500	2017 HL_{62}	—	April 7, 2006	Kitt Peak	Spacewatch	THM	2.0 km	MPC · JPL

== 523501–523600 ==
back to top

Designation			Discovery			Properties		Ref
Permanent	Provisional	Named after	Date	Site	Discoverer(s)	Category	Diam.	Ref
523501	2017 HP_{62}	—	December 30, 2007	Mount Lemmon	Mount Lemmon Survey	·	910 m	MPC · JPL
523502	2017 HS_{62}	—	December 24, 2014	Mount Lemmon	Mount Lemmon Survey	EOS	1.6 km	MPC · JPL
523503	2017 HW_{62}	—	April 2, 2011	Haleakala	Pan-STARRS 1	·	2.9 km	MPC · JPL
523504	2017 JV_{3}	—	April 3, 2010	WISE	WISE	·	3.6 km	MPC · JPL
523505	2017 JM_{4}	—	May 7, 2000	Socorro	LINEAR	·	3.6 km	MPC · JPL
523506	2017 JK_{6}	—	October 25, 2014	Haleakala	Pan-STARRS 1	·	1.9 km	MPC · JPL
523507	2017 KO_{36}	—	May 3, 2011	Kitt Peak	Spacewatch	·	2.7 km	MPC · JPL
523508	2017 KP_{37}	—	January 26, 2011	Mount Lemmon	Mount Lemmon Survey	AGN	1.3 km	MPC · JPL
523509	2017 LJ	—	April 24, 2012	Mount Lemmon	Mount Lemmon Survey	BAR	1.2 km	MPC · JPL
523510	2017 NB_{1}	—	August 22, 2004	Kitt Peak	Spacewatch	·	1.3 km	MPC · JPL
523511	2017 NT_{2}	—	December 22, 2008	Kitt Peak	Spacewatch	·	2.8 km	MPC · JPL
523512	2017 NQ_{4}	—	February 20, 2012	Haleakala	Pan-STARRS 1	·	1.4 km	MPC · JPL
523513	2017 OE_{6}	—	February 12, 2008	Mount Lemmon	Mount Lemmon Survey	·	1.3 km	MPC · JPL
523514	2017 OW_{9}	—	August 26, 2013	Haleakala	Pan-STARRS 1	EUN	980 m	MPC · JPL
523515	2017 OG_{10}	—	November 9, 2008	Kitt Peak	Spacewatch	EOS	1.8 km	MPC · JPL
523516	2017 OD_{15}	—	January 19, 2005	Kitt Peak	Spacewatch	·	1.1 km	MPC · JPL
523517	2017 OY_{24}	—	November 26, 2014	Haleakala	Pan-STARRS 1	·	2.0 km	MPC · JPL
523518	2017 OS_{29}	—	November 19, 2006	Kitt Peak	Spacewatch	·	1.2 km	MPC · JPL
523519	2017 OZ_{34}	—	January 28, 2011	Mount Lemmon	Mount Lemmon Survey	·	1.9 km	MPC · JPL
523520	2017 OY_{36}	—	January 27, 2007	Kitt Peak	Spacewatch	·	1.9 km	MPC · JPL
523521	2017 OA_{43}	—	November 5, 2010	Mount Lemmon	Mount Lemmon Survey	·	1.5 km	MPC · JPL
523522	2017 OC_{44}	—	October 11, 2007	Kitt Peak	Spacewatch	·	1.8 km	MPC · JPL
523523	2017 OR_{45}	—	December 3, 2010	Mount Lemmon	Mount Lemmon Survey	·	2.0 km	MPC · JPL
523524	2017 OA_{51}	—	August 23, 2004	Kitt Peak	Spacewatch	·	1.2 km	MPC · JPL
523525	2017 OJ_{59}	—	August 13, 2012	Kitt Peak	Spacewatch	·	2.2 km	MPC · JPL
523526	2017 OB_{60}	—	January 8, 2010	Kitt Peak	Spacewatch	(12739)	1.3 km	MPC · JPL
523527	2017 OH_{61}	—	October 25, 2012	Mount Lemmon	Mount Lemmon Survey	·	2.7 km	MPC · JPL
523528	2017 OR_{64}	—	October 19, 2003	Kitt Peak	Spacewatch	KOR	1.4 km	MPC · JPL
523529	2017 OR_{65}	—	September 26, 2006	Kitt Peak	Spacewatch	URS	2.7 km	MPC · JPL
523530	2017 OA_{66}	—	February 25, 2011	Mount Lemmon	Mount Lemmon Survey	·	1.5 km	MPC · JPL
523531	2017 OR_{66}	—	August 30, 2005	Kitt Peak	Spacewatch	·	3.1 km	MPC · JPL
523532	2017 PY_{5}	—	October 3, 2013	Haleakala	Pan-STARRS 1	(11882)	1.3 km	MPC · JPL
523533	2017 PA_{6}	—	September 3, 2008	Kitt Peak	Spacewatch	AGN	1.1 km	MPC · JPL
523534	2017 PA_{7}	—	August 19, 2006	Kitt Peak	Spacewatch	·	2.1 km	MPC · JPL
523535	2017 PC_{21}	—	November 27, 2006	Mount Lemmon	Mount Lemmon Survey	·	1.2 km	MPC · JPL
523536	2017 PZ_{23}	—	February 5, 2009	Kitt Peak	Spacewatch	·	2.7 km	MPC · JPL
523537	2017 QT_{3}	—	January 19, 2012	Haleakala	Pan-STARRS 1	·	1.2 km	MPC · JPL
523538	2017 QA_{21}	—	March 13, 2011	Mount Lemmon	Mount Lemmon Survey	·	1.9 km	MPC · JPL
523539	2017 QJ_{22}	—	September 17, 2009	Mount Lemmon	Mount Lemmon Survey	·	920 m	MPC · JPL
523540	2017 SP_{22}	—	January 1, 2008	Kitt Peak	Spacewatch	·	3.3 km	MPC · JPL
523541	2017 SJ_{29}	—	June 7, 2016	Mount Lemmon	Mount Lemmon Survey	·	1.1 km	MPC · JPL
523542	2017 SN_{30}	—	November 1, 2006	Kitt Peak	Spacewatch	·	2.4 km	MPC · JPL
523543	2017 SF_{34}	—	April 29, 2008	Mount Lemmon	Mount Lemmon Survey	·	980 m	MPC · JPL
523544	2017 SC_{37}	—	January 10, 2014	Kitt Peak	Spacewatch	·	1.8 km	MPC · JPL
523545	2017 UH_{30}	—	July 29, 2008	Kitt Peak	Spacewatch	·	1.3 km	MPC · JPL
523546	2017 VP_{9}	—	September 2, 2011	Haleakala	Pan-STARRS 1	·	2.4 km	MPC · JPL
523547	2017 VH_{11}	—	November 3, 2007	Kitt Peak	Spacewatch	·	2.4 km	MPC · JPL
523548	2017 VN_{21}	—	September 26, 2006	Kitt Peak	Spacewatch	EOS	1.7 km	MPC · JPL
523549	2017 VK_{24}	—	October 21, 2006	Kitt Peak	Spacewatch	·	2.8 km	MPC · JPL
523550	2017 VC_{27}	—	February 22, 2007	Kitt Peak	Spacewatch	·	1.1 km	MPC · JPL
523551	2017 VJ_{31}	—	March 4, 2012	Mount Lemmon	Mount Lemmon Survey	·	700 m	MPC · JPL
523552	2017 WP_{25}	—	December 21, 2012	Mount Lemmon	Mount Lemmon Survey	TIR	2.8 km	MPC · JPL
523553	2017 XH_{3}	—	September 21, 2011	Catalina	CSS	·	3.6 km	MPC · JPL
523554	2017 XS_{12}	—	January 31, 2006	Kitt Peak	Spacewatch	·	1.4 km	MPC · JPL
523555	2017 XV_{17}	—	December 17, 2007	Kitt Peak	Spacewatch	·	2.0 km	MPC · JPL
523556	2017 XY_{21}	—	September 6, 2008	Mount Lemmon	Mount Lemmon Survey	·	1.2 km	MPC · JPL
523557	2017 XZ_{28}	—	December 30, 2007	Kitt Peak	Spacewatch	·	2.0 km	MPC · JPL
523558	2017 XQ_{30}	—	November 23, 2006	Mount Lemmon	Mount Lemmon Survey	·	2.2 km	MPC · JPL
523559	2017 XM_{45}	—	September 29, 2011	Mount Lemmon	Mount Lemmon Survey	·	2.5 km	MPC · JPL
523560	2017 XM_{55}	—	October 6, 2008	Kitt Peak	Spacewatch	·	1.3 km	MPC · JPL
523561	2017 YH_{2}	—	October 31, 2013	Mount Lemmon	Mount Lemmon Survey	EUN	1.3 km	MPC · JPL
523562	2017 YR_{9}	—	November 14, 2010	Mount Lemmon	Mount Lemmon Survey	·	1.1 km	MPC · JPL
523563	2017 YM_{11}	—	July 29, 2008	Kitt Peak	Spacewatch	·	1.3 km	MPC · JPL
523564	2018 AF_{14}	—	October 16, 2012	Catalina	CSS	·	1.6 km	MPC · JPL
523565	2018 CA_{6}	—	March 5, 2010	Catalina	CSS	·	1.6 km	MPC · JPL
523566	2018 CS_{11}	—	August 23, 2007	Kitt Peak	Spacewatch	·	990 m	MPC · JPL
523567	2018 CW_{15}	—	February 14, 2010	Kitt Peak	Spacewatch	·	1.2 km	MPC · JPL
523568	2018 CD_{16}	—	November 12, 2012	Kitt Peak	Spacewatch	·	1.8 km	MPC · JPL
523569	2018 DH_{2}	—	March 9, 2014	Haleakala	Pan-STARRS 1	EUN	1.2 km	MPC · JPL
523570	2018 DL_{2}	—	January 17, 2007	Kitt Peak	Spacewatch	·	2.7 km	MPC · JPL
523571	2018 DY_{2}	—	November 9, 2007	Kitt Peak	Spacewatch	AGN	1 km	MPC · JPL
523572	2018 DD_{3}	—	December 27, 2005	Mount Lemmon	Mount Lemmon Survey	·	3.3 km	MPC · JPL
523573	2018 EM_{6}	—	December 25, 2005	Kitt Peak	Spacewatch	·	2.8 km	MPC · JPL
523574	2018 EX_{6}	—	March 9, 2007	Catalina	CSS	·	3.2 km	MPC · JPL
523575	2018 EY_{6}	—	April 20, 2010	Mount Lemmon	Mount Lemmon Survey	·	2.0 km	MPC · JPL
523576	2018 ED_{7}	—	February 23, 2007	Catalina	CSS	·	1.2 km	MPC · JPL
523577	2018 EW_{7}	—	October 18, 2012	Haleakala	Pan-STARRS 1	·	1.5 km	MPC · JPL
523578	2018 EO_{8}	—	March 10, 2007	Catalina	CSS	T_{j} (2.98)	2.9 km	MPC · JPL
523579	2018 EN_{9}	—	March 7, 2005	Socorro	LINEAR	·	1.5 km	MPC · JPL
523580	2018 FP	—	March 8, 2005	Mount Lemmon	Mount Lemmon Survey	H	500 m	MPC · JPL
523581	2018 FL_{5}	—	August 13, 2010	Kitt Peak	Spacewatch	·	1.4 km	MPC · JPL
523582	2018 FN_{5}	—	July 29, 2008	Mount Lemmon	Mount Lemmon Survey	H	600 m	MPC · JPL
523583	2018 FZ_{21}	—	October 20, 2003	Kitt Peak	Spacewatch	·	760 m	MPC · JPL
523584	2018 FE_{27}	—	February 19, 2010	WISE	WISE	·	1.4 km	MPC · JPL
523585	1998 MW_{5}	—	June 24, 1998	Socorro	LINEAR	APO	650 m	MPC · JPL
523586	1999 LK_{1}	—	June 4, 1999	Catalina	CSS	ATE	130 m	MPC · JPL
523587	1999 VQ_{11}	—	November 8, 1999	Socorro	LINEAR	AMO +1km	1.1 km	MPC · JPL
523588	2000 CN_{105}	—	February 6, 2000	Kitt Peak	M. W. Buie	cubewano (cold)	247 km	MPC · JPL
523589	2001 HA_{4}	—	April 16, 2001	Socorro	LINEAR	T_{j} (2.77) · APO +1km · PHA	1.9 km	MPC · JPL
523590	2001 QC_{96}	—	August 19, 2001	Socorro	LINEAR	APO	210 m	MPC · JPL
523591	2001 QD_{298}	—	August 19, 2001	Cerro Tololo	M. W. Buie	cubewano (hot)	233 km	MPC · JPL
523592	2001 SK_{276}	—	September 27, 2001	Socorro	LINEAR	T_{j} (2.81) · AMO +1km	980 m	MPC · JPL
523593	2001 TZ_{1}	—	October 11, 2001	Socorro	LINEAR	AMO	490 m	MPC · JPL
523594	2001 YO_{3}	—	December 18, 2001	Socorro	LINEAR	AMO	90 m	MPC · JPL
523595	2002 OS_{4}	—	July 19, 2002	Palomar	NEAT	AMO	660 m	MPC · JPL
523596	2002 PH_{80}	—	August 12, 2002	Socorro	LINEAR	AMO	400 m	MPC · JPL
523597	2002 QX_{47}	—	August 26, 2002	Palomar	C. A. Trujillo, M. E. Brown	centaur	100 km	MPC · JPL
523598	2003 ED_{50}	—	March 11, 2003	Socorro	LINEAR	APO · PHA	250 m	MPC · JPL
523599	2003 RM	—	September 2, 2003	Haleakala	NEAT	T_{j} (2.96) · AMO	420 m	MPC · JPL
523600	2003 RC_{2}	—	September 2, 2003	Socorro	LINEAR	APO	420 m	MPC · JPL

== 523601–523700 ==
back to top

Designation			Discovery			Properties		Ref
Permanent	Provisional	Named after	Date	Site	Discoverer(s)	Category	Diam.	Ref
523601	2003 UY_{413}	—	October 19, 2003	Palomar Mountain	M. E. Brown, C. A. Trujillo, D. Rabinowitz	cubewano (hot)	401 km	MPC · JPL
523602	2004 LH	—	June 9, 2004	Socorro	LINEAR	AMO	600 m	MPC · JPL
523603	2004 QJ_{7}	—	August 23, 2004	Siding Spring	SSS	APO · fast?	670 m	MPC · JPL
523604	2004 QB_{17}	—	August 25, 2004	Kitt Peak	Spacewatch	AMO	720 m	MPC · JPL
523605	2004 RX_{10}	—	September 8, 2004	Socorro	LINEAR	ATE	180 m	MPC · JPL
523606	2005 CJ	—	February 1, 2005	Kitt Peak	Spacewatch	APO · PHA	300 m	MPC · JPL
523607	2005 CS_{6}	—	February 2, 2005	Socorro	LINEAR	AMO +1km	940 m	MPC · JPL
523608	2005 EZ_{29}	—	March 4, 2005	Catalina	CSS	AMO	280 m	MPC · JPL
523609	2005 PJ_{2}	—	August 4, 2005	Palomar	NEAT	APO · PHA · fast?	440 m	MPC · JPL
523610	2005 TG	—	October 1, 2005	Mount Lemmon	Mount Lemmon Survey	AMO +1km · slow	810 m	MPC · JPL
523611	2005 UY_{5}	—	October 27, 2005	Mount Lemmon	Mount Lemmon Survey	AMO	640 m	MPC · JPL
523612	2006 BH	—	December 29, 2005	Catalina	CSS	T_{j} (2.64) · AMO	780 m	MPC · JPL
523613	2006 SJ_{198}	—	September 28, 2006	Mount Lemmon	Mount Lemmon Survey	AMO +1km	940 m	MPC · JPL
523614	2006 TH_{7}	—	September 21, 2006	Catalina	CSS	T_{j} (2.79) · APO	540 m	MPC · JPL
523615	2006 UO_{321}	—	October 19, 2006	Kitt Peak	Kitt Peak	cubewano (cold)	111 km	MPC · JPL
523616	2007 LC_{15}	—	June 11, 2007	Mount Lemmon	Mount Lemmon Survey	APO	650 m	MPC · JPL
523617	2007 PS_{45}	—	August 12, 2007	Palomar	Palomar	twotino	300 km	MPC · JPL
523618	2007 RT_{15}	—	September 11, 2007	Palomar	M. E. Schwamb, M. E. Brown, D. L. Rabinowitz	plutino	218 km	MPC · JPL
523619	2007 RX_{19}	—	September 14, 2007	Catalina	CSS	APO	700 m	MPC · JPL
523620	2007 RH_{283}	—	September 15, 2007	Palomar Mountain	M. E. Schwamb, M. E. Brown, D. Rabinowitz	centaur	106 km	MPC · JPL
523621	2007 TK_{8}	—	October 7, 2007	Pla D'Arguines	R. Ferrando	AMO	190 m	MPC · JPL
523622	2007 TG_{422}	—	October 3, 2007	Apache Point	A. C. Becker, Puckett, A. W., Kubica, J.	ESDO	192 km	MPC · JPL
523623	2008 CB_{22}	—	February 8, 2008	Catalina	CSS	APO · PHA	400 m	MPC · JPL
523624	2008 CT_{190}	—	February 9, 2008	Palomar	Palomar	res · 3:7 · moon	280 km	MPC · JPL
523625	2008 DG_{17}	—	February 29, 2008	Catalina	CSS	AMO · APO · moon	420 m	MPC · JPL
523626	2008 PH_{9}	—	August 6, 2008	Siding Spring	SSS	T_{j} (2.79) · AMO +1km	1.6 km	MPC · JPL
523627	2008 QB_{43}	—	August 25, 2008	Palomar	Palomar	cubewano (hot)	335 km	MPC · JPL
523628	2008 RT_{26}	—	September 7, 2008	Mount Lemmon	Mount Lemmon Survey	AMO	450 m	MPC · JPL
523629	2008 SP_{266}	—	September 26, 2008	Palomar	M. E. Schwamb, M. E. Brown, D. L. Rabinowitz	cubewano (hot)	336 km	MPC · JPL
523630	2009 OG	—	July 17, 2009	Siding Spring	SSS	T_{j} (2.41) · APO +1km · PHA	2.1 km	MPC · JPL
523631	2009 SX_{1}	—	September 18, 2009	Catalina	CSS	APO	560 m	MPC · JPL
523632	2009 UX_{17}	—	October 22, 2009	Catalina	CSS	AMO	310 m	MPC · JPL
523633	2009 XR_{2}	—	December 13, 2009	Catalina	CSS	AMO	580 m	MPC · JPL
523634	2010 AH_{2}	—	January 6, 2010	Kitt Peak	Spacewatch	cubewano (hot)	329 km	MPC · JPL
523635	2010 DN_{93}	—	February 26, 2010	Haleakala	Pan-STARRS 1	other TNO	429 km	MPC · JPL
523636	2010 EX_{119}	—	March 13, 2010	WISE	WISE	APO	550 m	MPC · JPL
523637	2010 LT_{108}	—	June 13, 2010	WISE	WISE	APO	600 m	MPC · JPL
523638	2010 MQ_{1}	—	June 19, 2010	Mount Lemmon	Mount Lemmon Survey	APO	310 m	MPC · JPL
523639	2010 RE_{64}	—	September 9, 2010	La Silla	D. L. Rabinowitz, M. E. Schwamb, S. Tourtellotte	SDO	526 km	MPC · JPL
523640	2010 RO_{64}	—	September 10, 2010	La Silla	D. L. Rabinowitz, M. E. Schwamb, S. Tourtellotte	cubewano (hot)	429 km	MPC · JPL
523641	2010 RO_{82}	—	September 10, 2010	Siding Spring	SSS	APO +1km	1.3 km	MPC · JPL
523642	2010 SS_{43}	—	September 17, 2010	Haleakala	Pan-STARRS 1	cubewano (hot)	347 km	MPC · JPL
523643	2010 TY_{53}	—	October 8, 2010	La Silla	D. L. Rabinowitz, M. E. Schwamb, S. Tourtellotte	centaur	453 km	MPC · JPL
523644	2010 VX_{11}	—	November 3, 2010	La Silla	D. L. Rabinowitz, M. E. Schwamb, S. Tourtellotte	plutino	272 km	MPC · JPL
523645	2010 VK_{201}	—	November 3, 2010	La Silla	D. L. Rabinowitz, M. E. Schwamb, S. Tourtellotte	cubewano (hot)	180 km	MPC · JPL
523646	2010 VL_{201}	—	November 12, 2010	La Silla	D. L. Rabinowitz, M. E. Schwamb, S. Tourtellotte	res · 3:4	253 km	MPC · JPL
523647	2010 VV_{224}	—	November 7, 2010	Haleakala	Pan-STARRS 1	cubewano (hot)	310 km	MPC · JPL
523648	2010 WP_{8}	—	December 20, 2007	Mount Lemmon	Mount Lemmon Survey	AMO	740 m	MPC · JPL
523649	2010 XZ_{78}	—	November 13, 2010	Kitt Peak	Spacewatch	T_{j} (2.48) · centaur	10 km	MPC · JPL
523650	2011 GQ_{61}	—	April 4, 2011	Mount Lemmon	Mount Lemmon Survey	APO · PHA	680 m	MPC · JPL
523651	2011 GA_{62}	—	April 11, 2011	Haleakala	Pan-STARRS 1	AMO	610 m	MPC · JPL
523652	2011 LZ_{28}	—	June 11, 2011	Haleakala	Pan-STARRS 1	centaur	211 km	MPC · JPL
523653	2011 OA_{60}	—	July 20, 2011	Haleakala	Pan-STARRS 1	other TNO	377 km	MPC · JPL
523654	2011 SR_{5}	—	September 19, 2011	Catalina	CSS	APO · PHA	230 m	MPC · JPL
523655	2011 VJ_{24}	—	November 10, 2011	Haleakala	Pan-STARRS 1	plutino	341 km	MPC · JPL
523656	2011 WO_{4}	—	November 17, 2011	Socorro	LINEAR	APO · PHA	490 m	MPC · JPL
523657	2012 DJ_{4}	—	January 19, 2012	Haleakala	Pan-STARRS 1	AMO	300 m	MPC · JPL
523658	2012 DW_{98}	—	February 27, 2012	Haleakala	Pan-STARRS 1	cubewano (hot)	297 km	MPC · JPL
523659	2012 HG_{84}	—	April 17, 2012	La Silla	D. L. Rabinowitz, M. E. Schwamb, S. Tourtellotte	cubewano (hot)	369 km	MPC · JPL
523660	2012 KY_{41}	—	May 21, 2012	Haleakala	Pan-STARRS 1	AMO +1km	800 m	MPC · JPL
523661	2012 LF_{11}	—	June 14, 2012	Haleakala	Pan-STARRS 1	ATE	250 m	MPC · JPL
523662	2012 MU_{2}	—	June 18, 2012	Catalina	CSS	AMO · APO · PHA	250 m	MPC · JPL
523663	2012 OZ	—	July 18, 2012	Catalina	CSS	AMO	340 m	MPC · JPL
523664	2012 OD_{1}	—	July 19, 2012	La Sagra	OAM	ATE · PHA	350 m	MPC · JPL
523665	2012 RF_{15}	—	September 13, 2012	Siding Spring	SSS	AMO	350 m	MPC · JPL
523666	2012 RS_{16}	—	September 14, 2012	La Sagra	OAM	AMO	200 m	MPC · JPL
523667	2012 TM_{139}	—	October 10, 2012	Catalina	CSS	AMO	410 m	MPC · JPL
523668	2012 UV_{27}	—	October 16, 2012	Mount Lemmon	Mount Lemmon Survey	AMO	430 m	MPC · JPL
523669	2012 XS_{134}	—	December 10, 2012	Haleakala	Pan-STARRS 1	AMO	730 m	MPC · JPL
523670	2013 EP_{41}	—	March 8, 2013	Haleakala	Pan-STARRS 1	AMO	470 m	MPC · JPL
523671	2013 FZ_{27}	—	March 16, 2013	Cerro Tololo	S. S. Sheppard, C. A. Trujillo	twotino	531 km	MPC · JPL
523672	2013 FJ_{28}	—	March 16, 2013	Cerro Tololo	C. A. Trujillo, S. S. Sheppard	centaur	144 km	MPC · JPL
523673	2013 MZ_{11}	—	June 30, 2013	Haleakala	Pan-STARRS 1	centaur	137 km	MPC · JPL
523674	2013 MA_{12}	—	June 30, 2013	Haleakala	Pan-STARRS 1	cubewano (hot)	369 km	MPC · JPL
523675	2013 PV_{74}	—	August 4, 2013	Haleakala	Pan-STARRS 1	SDO	281 km	MPC · JPL
523676	2013 UL_{10}	—	October 3, 2013	Kitt Peak	Spacewatch	T_{j} (2.94) · centaur	20 km	MPC · JPL
523677	2013 UF_{15}	—	October 25, 2013	Haleakala	Pan-STARRS 1	res · 3:5	221 km	MPC · JPL
523678	2013 XB_{26}	—	December 4, 2013	Haleakala	Pan-STARRS 1	cubewano (cold)	289 km	MPC · JPL
523679	2013 YB_{38}	—	December 27, 2013	Mount Lemmon	Mount Lemmon Survey	AMO +1km	970 m	MPC · JPL
523680	2013 YJ_{151}	—	December 26, 2013	Haleakala	Pan-STARRS 1	SDO	293 km	MPC · JPL
523681	2014 BV_{64}	—	January 26, 2014	Haleakala	Pan-STARRS 1	cubewano (hot)	543 km	MPC · JPL
523682	2014 CN_{23}	—	February 10, 2014	Haleakala	Pan-STARRS 1	centaur	90 km	MPC · JPL
523683	2014 CP_{23}	—	February 10, 2014	Haleakala	Pan-STARRS 1	SDO	222 km	MPC · JPL
523684	2014 CQ_{23}	—	February 10, 2014	Haleakala	Pan-STARRS 1	cubewano (hot)	344 km	MPC · JPL
523685	2014 DN_{112}	—	February 28, 2014	Haleakala	Pan-STARRS 1	APO · PHA	340 m	MPC · JPL
523686	2014 DB_{143}	—	February 28, 2014	Haleakala	Pan-STARRS 1	centaur	80 km	MPC · JPL
523687	2014 DF_{143}	—	February 28, 2014	Haleakala	Pan-STARRS 1	cubewano (hot)	383 km	MPC · JPL
523688	2014 DK_{143}	—	February 28, 2014	Haleakala	Pan-STARRS 1	res · 3:5	296 km	MPC · JPL
523689	2014 DL_{143}	—	February 26, 2014	Haleakala	Pan-STARRS 1	cubewano (hot)	273 km	MPC · JPL
523690	2014 DN_{143}	—	February 28, 2014	Haleakala	Pan-STARRS 1	cubewano (hot)	419 km	MPC · JPL
523691	2014 DO_{143}	—	February 4, 2014	La Silla	D. L. Rabinowitz	twotino	278 km	MPC · JPL
523692	2014 EZ_{51}	—	April 28, 2014	Cerro Tololo	DECam	other TNO	1260 km	MPC · JPL
523693	2014 FT_{71}	—	March 24, 2014	Cerro Tololo	S. S. Sheppard, C. A. Trujillo	cubewano (hot)	500 km	MPC · JPL
523694	2014 GF_{50}	—	April 8, 2014	Mount Lemmon	Mount Lemmon Survey	AMO	250 m	MPC · JPL
523695	2014 GS_{53}	—	April 4, 2014	Haleakala	Pan-STARRS 1	centaur	292 km	MPC · JPL
523696	2014 GW_{53}	—	April 4, 2014	Haleakala	Pan-STARRS 1	cubewano (hot)	369 km	MPC · JPL
523697	2014 GY_{53}	—	April 5, 2014	Haleakala	Pan-STARRS 1	plutino	217 km	MPC · JPL
523698	2014 GD_{54}	—	April 5, 2014	Haleakala	Pan-STARRS 1	SDO	174 km	MPC · JPL
523699	2014 GH_{54}	—	April 5, 2014	Haleakala	Pan-STARRS 1	SDO	218 km	MPC · JPL
523700	2014 GM_{54}	—	May 17, 2010	Haleakala	Pan-STARRS 1	plutino	181 km	MPC · JPL

== 523701–523800 ==
back to top

Designation			Discovery			Properties		Ref
Permanent	Provisional	Named after	Date	Site	Discoverer(s)	Category	Diam.	Ref
523701	2014 HT_{199}	—	April 27, 2012	Haleakala	Pan-STARRS 1	plutino	166 km	MPC · JPL
523702	2014 HW_{199}	—	April 30, 2014	Haleakala	Pan-STARRS 1	cubewano (hot)	298 km	MPC · JPL
523703	2014 HX_{199}	—	April 24, 2014	Haleakala	Pan-STARRS 1	plutino	182 km	MPC · JPL
523704	2014 HB_{200}	—	April 28, 2014	Haleakala	Pan-STARRS 1	plutino	155 km	MPC · JPL
523705	2014 HE_{200}	—	April 29, 2014	Haleakala	Pan-STARRS 1	SDO	201 km	MPC · JPL
523706	2014 HF_{200}	—	April 30, 2014	Haleakala	Pan-STARRS 1	SDO	259 km	MPC · JPL
523707	2014 JM_{25}	—	May 4, 2014	Haleakala	Pan-STARRS 1	AMO	190 m	MPC · JPL
523708	2014 JB_{80}	—	May 7, 2014	Haleakala	Pan-STARRS 1	centaur	40 km	MPC · JPL
523709	2014 JD_{80}	—	May 9, 2014	Haleakala	Pan-STARRS 1	centaur	80 km	MPC · JPL
523710	2014 JF_{80}	—	May 7, 2014	Haleakala	Pan-STARRS 1	centaur	100 km	MPC · JPL
523711	2014 JH_{80}	—	May 7, 2014	Haleakala	Pan-STARRS 1	cubewano (hot)	195 km	MPC · JPL
523712	2014 JS_{80}	—	May 6, 2014	Haleakala	Pan-STARRS 1	cubewano (hot)	355 km	MPC · JPL
523713	2014 JX_{80}	—	May 9, 2014	Haleakala	Pan-STARRS 1	res · 2:5	220 km	MPC · JPL
523714	2014 KR_{101}	—	May 23, 2014	Haleakala	Pan-STARRS 1	centaur	30 km	MPC · JPL
523715	2014 KU_{101}	—	May 5, 2013	Calar Alto	S. Hellmich, G. Hahn	plutino	277 km	MPC · JPL
523716	2014 KW_{101}	—	May 31, 2014	Haleakala	Pan-STARRS 1	cubewano (hot)	310 km	MPC · JPL
523717	2014 KY_{101}	—	May 23, 2014	Haleakala	Pan-STARRS 1	plutino	246 km	MPC · JPL
523718	2014 KZ_{101}	—	May 23, 2014	Haleakala	Pan-STARRS 1	SDO	189 km	MPC · JPL
523719	2014 LM_{28}	—	June 2, 2014	Haleakala	Pan-STARRS 1	T_{j} (0.47) · centaur	60 km	MPC · JPL
523720	2014 LN_{28}	—	June 2, 2014	Haleakala	Pan-STARRS 1	centaur	121 km	MPC · JPL
523721	2014 LR_{28}	—	June 5, 2014	Haleakala	Pan-STARRS 1	cubewano (cold)	298 km	MPC · JPL
523722	2014 LV_{28}	—	June 4, 2014	Haleakala	Pan-STARRS 1	SDO	277 km	MPC · JPL
523723	2014 MY_{69}	—	June 28, 2014	Haleakala	Pan-STARRS 1	cubewano (hot)	330 km	MPC · JPL
523724	2014 MA_{70}	—	June 26, 2014	Haleakala	Pan-STARRS 1	cubewano (cold)	302 km	MPC · JPL
523725	2014 MC_{70}	—	June 27, 2014	Haleakala	Pan-STARRS 1	res · 6:11	224 km	MPC · JPL
523726	2014 MJ_{70}	—	June 28, 2014	Haleakala	Pan-STARRS 1	SDO	222 km	MPC · JPL
523727	2014 NW_{65}	—	July 2, 2014	Haleakala	Pan-STARRS 1	centaur	286 km	MPC · JPL
523728	2014 ON_{344}	—	July 28, 2014	Haleakala	Pan-STARRS 1	APO	110 m	MPC · JPL
523729	2014 OX_{393}	—	July 31, 2014	Haleakala	Pan-STARRS 1	centaur	30 km	MPC · JPL
523730	2014 OH_{394}	—	July 25, 2014	Haleakala	Pan-STARRS 1	cubewano (hot)	297 km	MPC · JPL
523731	2014 OK_{394}	—	September 20, 1995	Kitt Peak	Spacewatch	res · 3:5	217 km	MPC · JPL
523732	2014 PG_{51}	—	August 4, 2014	La Sagra	OAM	APO · PHA	260 m	MPC · JPL
523733	2014 PR_{70}	—	August 6, 2014	Haleakala	Pan-STARRS 1	centaur	50 km	MPC · JPL
523734	2014 QV_{441}	—	August 22, 2014	Haleakala	Pan-STARRS 1	centaur	100 km	MPC · JPL
523735	2014 QX_{441}	—	August 22, 2014	Haleakala	Pan-STARRS 1	other TNO	298 km	MPC · JPL
523736	2014 QA_{442}	—	October 6, 2010	La Silla	D. L. Rabinowitz, M. E. Schwamb, S. Tourtellotte	cubewano (hot)	150 km	MPC · JPL
523737	2014 RC_{11}	—	September 1, 2014	Catalina	CSS	AMO	260 m	MPC · JPL
523738	2014 SH_{349}	—	September 23, 2014	Haleakala	Pan-STARRS 1	cubewano (hot)	416 km	MPC · JPL
523739	2014 TZ_{33}	—	October 3, 2014	Mount Lemmon	Mount Lemmon Survey	T_{j} (0.39) · centaur	30 km	MPC · JPL
523740	2014 TV_{85}	—	October 1, 2014	Haleakala	Pan-STARRS 1	centaur	70 km	MPC · JPL
523741	2014 TY_{85}	—	October 3, 2014	Haleakala	Pan-STARRS 1	res · 5:8	177 km	MPC · JPL
523742	2014 TZ_{85}	—	October 1, 2014	Haleakala	Pan-STARRS 1	res · 4:7	412 km	MPC · JPL
523743	2014 TA_{86}	—	October 2, 2014	Haleakala	Pan-STARRS 1	res · 3:5	231 km	MPC · JPL
523744	2014 TC_{86}	—	October 1, 2014	Haleakala	Pan-STARRS 1	cubewano (cold)	240 km	MPC · JPL
523745	2014 TD_{86}	—	October 1, 2014	Haleakala	Pan-STARRS 1	cubewano (cold)	305 km	MPC · JPL
523746	2014 UT_{114}	—	October 22, 2014	Mount Lemmon	Mount Lemmon Survey	centaur	103 km	MPC · JPL
523747	2014 US_{192}	—	October 3, 2014	Haleakala	Pan-STARRS 1	APO	870 m	MPC · JPL
523748	2014 UP_{224}	—	October 26, 2014	Haleakala	Pan-STARRS 1	cubewano (hot)	302 km	MPC · JPL
523749	2014 UR_{224}	—	October 26, 2014	Haleakala	Pan-STARRS 1	other TNO	285 km	MPC · JPL
523750	2014 US_{224}	—	October 28, 2014	Haleakala	Pan-STARRS 1	cubewano (hot)	523 km	MPC · JPL
523751	2014 UU_{224}	—	October 26, 2014	Haleakala	Pan-STARRS 1	plutino	190 km	MPC · JPL
523752	2014 VU_{37}	—	November 12, 2014	Haleakala	Pan-STARRS 1	cubewano (hot)	493 km	MPC · JPL
523753	2014 WV_{508}	—	November 26, 2014	Haleakala	Pan-STARRS 1	centaur	70 km	MPC · JPL
523754	2014 WX_{508}	—	November 29, 2014	Haleakala	Pan-STARRS 1	centaur	30 km	MPC · JPL
523755	2014 WZ_{508}	—	March 3, 2011	Mount Lemmon	Mount Lemmon Survey	centaur	145 km	MPC · JPL
523756	2014 WD_{509}	—	November 18, 2014	Haleakala	Pan-STARRS 1	cubewano (cold) · moon	216 km	MPC · JPL
523757	2014 WH_{509}	—	November 21, 2014	Haleakala	Pan-STARRS 1	cubewano (hot)	458 km	MPC · JPL
523758	2014 WJ_{509}	—	November 21, 2014	Haleakala	Pan-STARRS 1	cubewano (hot)	364 km	MPC · JPL
523759	2014 WK_{509}	—	November 22, 2014	Haleakala	Pan-STARRS 1	other TNO	506 km	MPC · JPL
523760	2014 WQ_{509}	—	November 17, 2014	Haleakala	Pan-STARRS 1	plutino	359 km	MPC · JPL
523761	2014 WU_{509}	—	November 20, 2014	Haleakala	Pan-STARRS 1	cubewano (hot)	298 km	MPC · JPL
523762	2014 WX_{509}	—	November 26, 2014	Haleakala	Pan-STARRS 1	cubewano (hot)	276 km	MPC · JPL
523763	2014 WZ_{509}	—	November 28, 2014	Haleakala	Pan-STARRS 1	other TNO	295 km	MPC · JPL
523764	2014 WC_{510}	—	November 20, 2014	Haleakala	Pan-STARRS 1	plutino · moon	181 km	MPC · JPL
523765	2014 WD_{510}	—	December 4, 2011	Haleakala	Pan-STARRS 1	SDO	249 km	MPC · JPL
523766	2014 WF_{510}	—	November 22, 2014	Haleakala	Pan-STARRS 1	plutino	195 km	MPC · JPL
523767	2014 WH_{510}	—	November 23, 2014	Haleakala	Pan-STARRS 1	SDO	196 km	MPC · JPL
523768	2014 WQ_{510}	—	November 27, 2014	Haleakala	Pan-STARRS 1	plutino	371 km	MPC · JPL
523769	2014 WS_{510}	—	November 29, 2014	Haleakala	Pan-STARRS 1	res · 2:5	302 km	MPC · JPL
523770	2014 XO_{40}	—	December 10, 2014	Haleakala	Pan-STARRS 1	centaur	142 km	MPC · JPL
523771	2014 XP_{40}	—	December 1, 2014	Haleakala	Pan-STARRS 1	centaur	216 km	MPC · JPL
523772	2014 XR_{40}	—	December 2, 2014	Haleakala	Pan-STARRS 1	cubewano (hot)	447 km	MPC · JPL
523773	2014 XS_{40}	—	December 7, 2014	Haleakala	Pan-STARRS 1	cubewano (hot)	421 km	MPC · JPL
523774	2014 XV_{40}	—	December 1, 2014	Haleakala	Pan-STARRS 1	SDO	243 km	MPC · JPL
523775	2014 YB_{35}	—	December 27, 2014	Catalina	CSS	APO · PHA · moon	280 m	MPC · JPL
523776	2014 YB_{50}	—	December 26, 2014	Haleakala	Pan-STARRS 1	cubewano (hot)	304 km	MPC · JPL
523777	2014 YF_{50}	—	December 25, 2014	Haleakala	Pan-STARRS 1	SDO	321 km	MPC · JPL
523778	2014 YK_{50}	—	December 29, 2014	Haleakala	Pan-STARRS 1	SDO	258 km	MPC · JPL
523779	2015 AX_{16}	—	May 31, 2014	Haleakala	Pan-STARRS 1	AMO +1km	840 m	MPC · JPL
523780	2015 AN_{281}	—	January 15, 2015	Haleakala	Pan-STARRS 1	cubewano (hot)	439 km	MPC · JPL
523781	2015 BV_{92}	—	January 17, 2015	Mount Lemmon	Mount Lemmon Survey	AMO	370 m	MPC · JPL
523782	2015 BD_{518}	—	January 17, 2015	Haleakala	Pan-STARRS 1	centaur	70 km	MPC · JPL
523783	2015 BG_{518}	—	January 23, 2015	Haleakala	Pan-STARRS 1	centaur	20 km	MPC · JPL
523784	2015 BJ_{518}	—	January 19, 2015	Haleakala	Pan-STARRS 1	centaur	127 km	MPC · JPL
523785	2015 CM_{3}	—	December 21, 2014	Haleakala	Pan-STARRS 1	centaur	20 km	MPC · JPL
523786	2015 DP	—	January 24, 2015	Haleakala	Pan-STARRS 1	AMO	730 m	MPC · JPL
523787	2015 DV_{224}	—	February 23, 2015	Haleakala	Pan-STARRS 1	centaur	164 km	MPC · JPL
523788	2015 FP_{118}	—	March 21, 2015	Haleakala	Pan-STARRS 1	APO · PHA	450 m	MPC · JPL
523789	2015 FN_{345}	—	March 25, 2015	Haleakala	Pan-STARRS 1	cubewano (hot)	100 km	MPC · JPL
523790	2015 HP_{9}	—	May 1, 2016	Cerro Tololo	DECam	centaur	40 km	MPC · JPL
523791	2015 HT_{171}	—	March 27, 2014	Mount Lemmon	Mount Lemmon Survey	T_{j} (2.83) · centaur	20 km	MPC · JPL
523792	2015 MR_{101}	—	June 24, 2015	Haleakala	Pan-STARRS 1	APO	750 m	MPC · JPL
523793	2015 OV_{79}	—	July 26, 2015	Haleakala	Pan-STARRS 1	cubewano (hot)	304 km	MPC · JPL
523794	2015 RR_{245}	—	September 13, 2010	Haleakala	Pan-STARRS 1	res · 2:9 · moon	648 km	MPC · JPL
523795	2015 TQ_{178}	—	July 24, 1993	Kitt Peak	Spacewatch	AMO	290 m	MPC · JPL
523796	2016 LE_{51}	—	June 11, 2016	Mount Lemmon	Mount Lemmon Survey	APO	350 m	MPC · JPL
523797	2016 NM_{56}	—	July 14, 2016	Haleakala	Pan-STARRS 1	centaur	30 km	MPC · JPL
523798	2017 CX_{33}	—	February 1, 2017	Haleakala	Pan-STARRS 1	T_{j} (1.26) · centaur	30 km	MPC · JPL
523799	2017 DO_{36}	—	November 10, 2016	Haleakala	Pan-STARRS 1	AMO +1km	950 m	MPC · JPL
523800	2017 KZ_{31}	—	April 11, 2016	Haleakala	Pan-STARRS 1	centaur	50 km	MPC · JPL

== 523801–523900 ==
back to top

Designation			Discovery			Properties		Ref
Permanent	Provisional	Named after	Date	Site	Discoverer(s)	Category	Diam.	Ref
523801	1993 TQ_{2}	—	October 11, 1993	Kitt Peak	Spacewatch	AMO	350 m	MPC · JPL
523802	1998 KH_{9}	—	May 27, 1998	Socorro	LINEAR	AMO	730 m	MPC · JPL
523803	1999 RV_{2}	—	September 5, 1999	Catalina	CSS	AMO	600 m	MPC · JPL
523804	2000 YF_{29}	—	December 22, 2000	Haleakala	NEAT	APO · PHA	310 m	MPC · JPL
523805	2001 QA_{143}	—	August 25, 2001	Socorro	LINEAR	AMO	370 m	MPC · JPL
523806	2002 WW_{17}	—	November 28, 2002	Haleakala	NEAT	T_{j} (2.82) · AMO +1km	1.2 km	MPC · JPL
523807	2003 LG	—	June 2, 2003	Anderson Mesa	LONEOS	APO	690 m	MPC · JPL
523808	2007 ML_{24}	—	June 22, 2007	Mount Lemmon	Mount Lemmon Survey	ATE · PHA	480 m	MPC · JPL
523809	2007 TV_{18}	—	October 9, 2007	Mount Lemmon	Mount Lemmon Survey	APO	60 m	MPC · JPL
523810	2008 RG_{98}	—	September 9, 2008	Kitt Peak	Spacewatch	APO +1km	1.3 km	MPC · JPL
523811	2008 TQ_{2}	—	October 3, 2008	Mount Lemmon	Mount Lemmon Survey	AMO · fast	250 m	MPC · JPL
523812	2008 TY_{3}	—	October 6, 2008	Mount Lemmon	Mount Lemmon Survey	AMO	50 m	MPC · JPL
523813	2008 VB_{1}	—	November 3, 2008	Kitt Peak	Spacewatch	APO · PHA	260 m	MPC · JPL
523814	2008 WN_{2}	—	October 24, 2008	Kitt Peak	Spacewatch	APO · PHA	240 m	MPC · JPL
523815	2009 HW_{44}	—	April 22, 2009	Mount Lemmon	Mount Lemmon Survey	T_{j} (2.81) · AMO +1km	1.1 km	MPC · JPL
523816	2009 ST_{103}	—	September 26, 2009	Catalina	CSS	T_{j} (2.89) · APO +1km · PHA	850 m	MPC · JPL
523817	2009 TK	—	October 8, 2009	Siding Spring	SSS	AMO · fast	120 m	MPC · JPL
523818	2010 SH_{13}	—	September 27, 2010	Kitt Peak	Spacewatch	AMO · PHA	200 m	MPC · JPL
523819	2010 VB_{72}	—	November 8, 2010	Catalina	CSS	AMO	230 m	MPC · JPL
523820	2011 GN_{44}	—	April 3, 2011	Haleakala	Pan-STARRS 1	T_{j} (2.92) · APO +1km · PHA	810 m	MPC · JPL
523821	2011 RF	—	September 1, 2011	Haleakala	Pan-STARRS 1	AMO	280 m	MPC · JPL
523822	2012 DG_{61}	—	February 28, 2012	Haleakala	Pan-STARRS 1	T_{j} (2.63) · APO +1km	870 m	MPC · JPL
523823	2015 BG_{311}	—	November 29, 2014	Haleakala	Pan-STARRS 1	AMO	770 m	MPC · JPL
523824	2016 RO_{1}	—	September 3, 2016	Mount Lemmon	Mount Lemmon Survey	AMO	430 m	MPC · JPL
523825	1977 RS	—	September 8, 1977	Palomar	C. J. van Houten, I. van Houten-Groeneveld, T. Gehrels	·	1.5 km	MPC · JPL
523826	1990 UP	—	October 24, 1990	Kitt Peak	Spacewatch	AMO	300 m	MPC · JPL
523827	1990 XD_{1}	—	December 11, 1990	Kitt Peak	Spacewatch	·	1.7 km	MPC · JPL
523828	1992 BC	—	January 29, 1992	Palomar	K. J. Lawrence, E. F. Helin	APO	360 m	MPC · JPL
523829	1993 BJ_{9}	—	January 21, 1993	Kitt Peak	Spacewatch	KON	2.9 km	MPC · JPL
523830	1993 RS_{1}	—	September 15, 1993	Kitt Peak	Spacewatch	·	1.5 km	MPC · JPL
523831	1994 AQ_{7}	—	January 7, 1994	Kitt Peak	Spacewatch	BRA	1.7 km	MPC · JPL
523832	1994 GD_{2}	—	April 3, 1994	Kitt Peak	Spacewatch	·	2.9 km	MPC · JPL
523833	1994 RE_{3}	—	September 2, 1994	Kitt Peak	Spacewatch	T_{j} (2.98) · 3:2	4.6 km	MPC · JPL
523834	1994 RK_{7}	—	September 12, 1994	Kitt Peak	Spacewatch	·	2.8 km	MPC · JPL
523835	1994 UQ_{5}	—	October 28, 1994	Kitt Peak	Spacewatch	·	1.2 km	MPC · JPL
523836	1994 WU_{12}	—	November 28, 1994	Kitt Peak	Spacewatch	·	2.7 km	MPC · JPL
523837	1995 BE_{8}	—	January 29, 1995	Kitt Peak	Spacewatch	·	560 m	MPC · JPL
523838	1995 BQ_{13}	—	January 31, 1995	Kitt Peak	Spacewatch	·	1.8 km	MPC · JPL
523839	1995 CE_{9}	—	February 4, 1995	Kitt Peak	Spacewatch	HNS	1.3 km	MPC · JPL
523840	1995 FJ_{2}	—	March 23, 1995	Kitt Peak	Spacewatch	·	1.4 km	MPC · JPL
523841	1995 MS_{2}	—	June 24, 1995	Kitt Peak	Spacewatch	·	3.9 km	MPC · JPL
523842	1995 ON_{11}	—	February 24, 1998	Kitt Peak	Spacewatch	·	1.4 km	MPC · JPL
523843	1995 OK_{14}	—	July 24, 1995	Kitt Peak	Spacewatch	·	2.0 km	MPC · JPL
523844	1995 OQ_{15}	—	July 30, 1995	Kitt Peak	Spacewatch	·	3.0 km	MPC · JPL
523845	1995 SO_{8}	—	September 17, 1995	Kitt Peak	Spacewatch	·	2.4 km	MPC · JPL
523846	1995 SA_{21}	—	September 19, 1995	Kitt Peak	Spacewatch	·	2.1 km	MPC · JPL
523847	1995 SW_{26}	—	September 19, 1995	Kitt Peak	Spacewatch	·	900 m	MPC · JPL
523848	1995 SV_{38}	—	September 24, 1995	Kitt Peak	Spacewatch	·	3.2 km	MPC · JPL
523849	1995 SA_{47}	—	September 26, 1995	Kitt Peak	Spacewatch	·	2.3 km	MPC · JPL
523850	1995 SQ_{55}	—	September 22, 1995	Kitt Peak	Spacewatch	·	1 km	MPC · JPL
523851	1995 SX_{63}	—	September 26, 1995	Kitt Peak	Spacewatch	EOS	1.6 km	MPC · JPL
523852	1995 SK_{79}	—	September 21, 1995	Kitt Peak	Spacewatch	AEO	1.0 km	MPC · JPL
523853	1995 SV_{80}	—	September 30, 1995	Kitt Peak	Spacewatch	·	2.5 km	MPC · JPL
523854	1995 SW_{81}	—	September 22, 1995	Kitt Peak	Spacewatch	·	1.0 km	MPC · JPL
523855	1995 SK_{87}	—	September 26, 1995	Kitt Peak	Spacewatch	·	2.4 km	MPC · JPL
523856	1995 SL_{87}	—	September 26, 1995	Kitt Peak	Spacewatch	NAE	2.6 km	MPC · JPL
523857	1995 TW_{4}	—	October 15, 1995	Kitt Peak	Spacewatch	·	2.8 km	MPC · JPL
523858	1995 UL_{21}	—	October 19, 1995	Kitt Peak	Spacewatch	·	2.1 km	MPC · JPL
523859	1995 UV_{27}	—	October 20, 1995	Kitt Peak	Spacewatch	EOS	1.9 km	MPC · JPL
523860	1995 UU_{36}	—	October 21, 1995	Kitt Peak	Spacewatch	H	350 m	MPC · JPL
523861	1995 UZ_{52}	—	October 23, 1995	Kitt Peak	Spacewatch	ELF	4.5 km	MPC · JPL
523862	1995 UX_{66}	—	October 17, 1995	Kitt Peak	Spacewatch	·	2.3 km	MPC · JPL
523863	1995 UG_{74}	—	October 21, 1995	Kitt Peak	Spacewatch	EOS	1.6 km	MPC · JPL
523864	1995 UY_{74}	—	October 21, 1995	Kitt Peak	Spacewatch	·	1.6 km	MPC · JPL
523865	1995 UK_{77}	—	October 22, 1995	Kitt Peak	Spacewatch	THM	1.7 km	MPC · JPL
523866	1995 UT_{80}	—	October 25, 1995	Kitt Peak	Spacewatch	GAL	1.1 km	MPC · JPL
523867	1995 VW_{8}	—	November 14, 1995	Kitt Peak	Spacewatch	·	1.0 km	MPC · JPL
523868	1995 VE_{9}	—	November 14, 1995	Kitt Peak	Spacewatch	HYG	3.3 km	MPC · JPL
523869	1995 WD_{11}	—	November 16, 1995	Kitt Peak	Spacewatch	·	870 m	MPC · JPL
523870	1995 WO_{25}	—	November 18, 1995	Kitt Peak	Spacewatch	·	1.2 km	MPC · JPL
523871	1995 WC_{36}	—	September 5, 2010	Mount Lemmon	Mount Lemmon Survey	·	940 m	MPC · JPL
523872	1995 YM_{19}	—	December 22, 1995	Kitt Peak	Spacewatch	·	3.7 km	MPC · JPL
523873	1996 AA_{18}	—	January 13, 1996	Kitt Peak	Spacewatch	EOS	2.1 km	MPC · JPL
523874	1996 CP_{3}	—	February 10, 1996	Kitt Peak	Spacewatch	·	2.9 km	MPC · JPL
523875	1996 EE_{6}	—	March 11, 1996	Kitt Peak	Spacewatch	·	1.8 km	MPC · JPL
523876	1996 JX_{8}	—	May 12, 1996	Kitt Peak	Spacewatch	·	690 m	MPC · JPL
523877	1996 JU_{14}	—	May 12, 1996	Kitt Peak	Spacewatch	KON	2.4 km	MPC · JPL
523878	1996 JY_{14}	—	May 12, 1996	Kitt Peak	Spacewatch	·	2.4 km	MPC · JPL
523879	1996 RT_{9}	—	September 7, 1996	Kitt Peak	Spacewatch	·	1.4 km	MPC · JPL
523880	1996 RJ_{22}	—	September 8, 1996	Kitt Peak	Spacewatch	·	1.1 km	MPC · JPL
523881	1996 TU_{16}	—	October 4, 1996	Kitt Peak	Spacewatch	·	1.5 km	MPC · JPL
523882	1996 TK_{27}	—	October 7, 1996	Kitt Peak	Spacewatch	·	1.1 km	MPC · JPL
523883	1996 TY_{31}	—	October 9, 1996	Kitt Peak	Spacewatch	·	2.7 km	MPC · JPL
523884	1996 TF_{32}	—	October 9, 1996	Kitt Peak	Spacewatch	JUN	1.1 km	MPC · JPL
523885	1996 TY_{36}	—	October 12, 1996	Kitt Peak	Spacewatch	·	1.2 km	MPC · JPL
523886	1996 TS_{43}	—	October 5, 1996	Kitt Peak	Spacewatch	·	1.8 km	MPC · JPL
523887	1996 TZ_{44}	—	October 6, 1996	Kitt Peak	Spacewatch	·	2.4 km	MPC · JPL
523888	1996 VU_{9}	—	November 3, 1996	Kitt Peak	Spacewatch	·	810 m	MPC · JPL
523889	1996 VW_{10}	—	November 4, 1996	Kitt Peak	Spacewatch	JUN	2.1 km	MPC · JPL
523890	1996 VJ_{12}	—	November 5, 1996	Kitt Peak	Spacewatch	·	1.2 km	MPC · JPL
523891	1996 VL_{17}	—	November 6, 1996	Kitt Peak	Spacewatch	·	1.7 km	MPC · JPL
523892	1996 VX_{31}	—	November 4, 1996	Kitt Peak	Spacewatch	·	2.5 km	MPC · JPL
523893	1996 VB_{32}	—	November 4, 1996	Kitt Peak	Spacewatch	·	750 m	MPC · JPL
523894	1996 VR_{35}	—	November 9, 1996	Kitt Peak	Spacewatch	·	750 m	MPC · JPL
523895	1996 VQ_{36}	—	November 5, 1996	Kitt Peak	Spacewatch	·	2.2 km	MPC · JPL
523896	1996 XR_{27}	—	December 9, 1996	Kitt Peak	Spacewatch	·	2.7 km	MPC · JPL
523897	1996 XG_{35}	—	January 15, 2008	Kitt Peak	Spacewatch	·	3.0 km	MPC · JPL
523898	1997 AN_{11}	—	January 3, 1997	Kitt Peak	Spacewatch	·	1.5 km	MPC · JPL
523899	1997 CV_{29}	—	February 6, 1997	Mauna Kea	J. Chen, C. A. Trujillo, D. C. Jewitt, J. X. Luu	cubewano (hot)	159 km	MPC · JPL
523900	1997 ET_{5}	—	March 4, 1997	Kitt Peak	Spacewatch	·	970 m	MPC · JPL

== 523901–524000 ==
back to top

Designation			Discovery			Properties		Ref
Permanent	Provisional	Named after	Date	Site	Discoverer(s)	Category	Diam.	Ref
523901	1997 EB_{11}	—	March 8, 1997	Kitt Peak	Spacewatch	·	740 m	MPC · JPL
523902	1997 FH_{5}	—	March 30, 1997	Kitt Peak	Spacewatch	PHO	1.0 km	MPC · JPL
523903	1997 GT_{2}	—	April 7, 1997	Kitt Peak	Spacewatch	·	700 m	MPC · JPL
523904	1997 JF_{7}	—	May 5, 1997	Kitt Peak	Spacewatch	L5	10 km	MPC · JPL
523905	1997 MV_{5}	—	June 26, 1997	Kitt Peak	Spacewatch	·	3.6 km	MPC · JPL
523906	1997 QR_{4}	—	August 31, 1997	Caussols	ODAS	·	1.3 km	MPC · JPL
523907	1997 SF_{7}	—	September 23, 1997	Kitt Peak	Spacewatch	EOS	1.8 km	MPC · JPL
523908	1997 SO_{8}	—	September 23, 1997	Kitt Peak	Spacewatch	·	610 m	MPC · JPL
523909	1997 SJ_{9}	—	September 27, 1997	Kitt Peak	Spacewatch	·	1.5 km	MPC · JPL
523910	1997 SY_{14}	—	September 28, 1997	Kitt Peak	Spacewatch	·	660 m	MPC · JPL
523911	1997 SN_{15}	—	September 27, 1997	Caussols	ODAS	·	1.2 km	MPC · JPL
523912	1997 SV_{26}	—	September 29, 1997	Kitt Peak	Spacewatch	MAR	1.4 km	MPC · JPL
523913	1997 ST_{32}	—	September 28, 1997	Kitt Peak	Spacewatch	·	1.5 km	MPC · JPL
523914	1997 UE_{17}	—	October 25, 1997	Kitt Peak	Spacewatch	·	2.2 km	MPC · JPL
523915	1997 VM_{4}	—	November 6, 1997	Socorro	LINEAR	T_{j} (2.79) · APO	690 m	MPC · JPL
523916	1997 VE_{9}	—	March 16, 2004	Kitt Peak	Spacewatch	·	2.0 km	MPC · JPL
523917	1997 WY_{3}	—	November 20, 1997	Kitt Peak	Spacewatch	(5)	880 m	MPC · JPL
523918	1997 WF_{13}	—	November 23, 1997	Kitt Peak	Spacewatch	·	3.5 km	MPC · JPL
523919	1997 WB_{17}	—	November 23, 1997	Kitt Peak	Spacewatch	·	550 m	MPC · JPL
523920	1997 YO_{19}	—	December 31, 1997	Kitt Peak	Spacewatch	·	1.0 km	MPC · JPL
523921	1998 AQ_{3}	—	January 2, 1998	Kitt Peak	Spacewatch	·	2.7 km	MPC · JPL
523922	1998 BV_{5}	—	January 22, 1998	Kitt Peak	Spacewatch	·	1.4 km	MPC · JPL
523923	1998 BU_{13}	—	January 24, 1998	Kitt Peak	Spacewatch	·	1.5 km	MPC · JPL
523924	1998 BR_{22}	—	January 23, 1998	Kitt Peak	Spacewatch	·	640 m	MPC · JPL
523925	1998 BQ_{28}	—	January 25, 1998	Kitt Peak	Spacewatch	·	2.1 km	MPC · JPL
523926	1998 BD_{40}	—	January 31, 1998	Kitt Peak	Spacewatch	TEL	1.2 km	MPC · JPL
523927	1998 DH_{17}	—	February 23, 1998	Kitt Peak	Spacewatch	·	1.1 km	MPC · JPL
523928	1998 DA_{26}	—	February 23, 1998	Kitt Peak	Spacewatch	·	2.6 km	MPC · JPL
523929	1998 DN_{30}	—	February 23, 1998	Kitt Peak	Spacewatch	·	830 m	MPC · JPL
523930	1998 EC_{6}	—	March 3, 1998	Kitt Peak	Spacewatch	V	760 m	MPC · JPL
523931	1998 EC_{7}	—	March 1, 1998	Kitt Peak	Spacewatch	EOS	1.9 km	MPC · JPL
523932	1998 ET_{22}	—	July 25, 2006	Mount Lemmon	Mount Lemmon Survey	·	3.4 km	MPC · JPL
523933	1998 FS	—	March 18, 1998	Kitt Peak	Spacewatch	·	620 m	MPC · JPL
523934	1998 FF_{14}	—	March 24, 1998	Socorro	LINEAR	APO · PHA	270 m	MPC · JPL
523935	1998 FJ_{73}	—	March 29, 1998	Socorro	LINEAR	·	2.0 km	MPC · JPL
523936	1998 GE_{13}	—	April 4, 1998	Kitt Peak	Spacewatch	·	1.0 km	MPC · JPL
523937	1998 HV	—	April 17, 1998	Kitt Peak	Spacewatch	·	2.1 km	MPC · JPL
523938	1998 HX_{1}	—	April 19, 1998	Kitt Peak	Spacewatch	V	600 m	MPC · JPL
523939	1998 HB_{12}	—	April 19, 1998	Kitt Peak	Spacewatch	·	770 m	MPC · JPL
523940	1998 HW_{15}	—	April 22, 1998	Kitt Peak	Spacewatch	·	1.3 km	MPC · JPL
523941	1998 HK_{49}	—	April 29, 1998	Kitt Peak	Spacewatch	APO	130 m	MPC · JPL
523942	1998 KG_{42}	—	May 28, 1998	Kitt Peak	Spacewatch	PHO	2.8 km	MPC · JPL
523943	1998 KV_{58}	—	May 23, 1998	Socorro	LINEAR	·	2.1 km	MPC · JPL
523944	1998 QZ_{111}	—	August 26, 1998	Kitt Peak	Spacewatch	·	3.0 km	MPC · JPL
523945	1998 RN_{1}	—	September 14, 1998	Socorro	LINEAR	AMO	550 m	MPC · JPL
523946	1998 RT_{43}	—	August 26, 1998	Kitt Peak	Spacewatch	·	970 m	MPC · JPL
523947	1998 RO_{81}	—	September 15, 1998	Kitt Peak	Spacewatch	·	1.5 km	MPC · JPL
523948	1998 ST_{6}	—	September 20, 1998	Kitt Peak	Spacewatch	DOR	2.4 km	MPC · JPL
523949	1998 SY_{11}	—	September 19, 1998	Caussols	ODAS	·	3.0 km	MPC · JPL
523950	1998 SZ_{27}	—	September 21, 1998	Socorro	LINEAR	ATE · PHA	330 m	MPC · JPL
523951	1998 SR_{51}	—	September 27, 1998	Kitt Peak	Spacewatch	·	1.1 km	MPC · JPL
523952	1998 TB_{23}	—	October 14, 1998	Kitt Peak	Spacewatch	·	1.6 km	MPC · JPL
523953	1998 UA_{3}	—	October 20, 1998	Caussols	ODAS	·	600 m	MPC · JPL
523954 Guman	1998 UF_{23}	Guman	October 22, 1998	Piszkéstető	K. Sárneczky, Szabo, G.	·	490 m	MPC · JPL
523955	1998 UU_{43}	—	October 22, 1998	Kitt Peak	M. W. Buie	res · 3:4	134 km	MPC · JPL
523956	1998 UB_{46}	—	October 24, 1998	Kitt Peak	Spacewatch	·	1.4 km	MPC · JPL
523957	1998 UZ_{46}	—	October 24, 1998	Kitt Peak	Spacewatch	·	2.0 km	MPC · JPL
523958	1998 UD_{51}	—	October 20, 1998	Kitt Peak	Spacewatch	·	1.1 km	MPC · JPL
523959	1998 UE_{51}	—	October 24, 1998	Kitt Peak	Spacewatch	LUT	3.5 km	MPC · JPL
523960	1998 VB_{44}	—	November 15, 1998	Kitt Peak	Spacewatch	·	4.6 km	MPC · JPL
523961	1998 VO_{47}	—	November 15, 1998	Kitt Peak	Spacewatch	NYS	1.3 km	MPC · JPL
523962	1998 VQ_{48}	—	November 15, 1998	Kitt Peak	Spacewatch	·	770 m	MPC · JPL
523963	1998 WL_{36}	—	November 19, 1998	Kitt Peak	Spacewatch	·	990 m	MPC · JPL
523964	1998 WP_{45}	—	November 12, 2012	Mount Lemmon	Mount Lemmon Survey	HOF	2.3 km	MPC · JPL
523965	1998 XY_{95}	—	December 12, 1998	La Palma	A. Fitzsimmons, Fletcher, E.	SDO	210 km	MPC · JPL
523966	1998 YF_{10}	—	December 22, 1998	Kitt Peak	Spacewatch	AMO	260 m	MPC · JPL
523967	1998 YR_{11}	—	December 23, 1998	Socorro	LINEAR	AMO +1km	840 m	MPC · JPL
523968	1998 YP_{15}	—	December 22, 1998	Kitt Peak	Spacewatch	·	3.3 km	MPC · JPL
523969	1999 AU_{15}	—	January 9, 1999	Kitt Peak	Spacewatch	EUN	1.4 km	MPC · JPL
523970	1999 AP_{30}	—	January 14, 1999	Kitt Peak	Spacewatch	·	2.9 km	MPC · JPL
523971	1999 AJ_{39}	—	January 15, 1999	Kitt Peak	Spacewatch	APO	200 m	MPC · JPL
523972	1999 CW_{8}	—	February 12, 1999	Socorro	LINEAR	APO	660 m	MPC · JPL
523973	1999 CD_{139}	—	February 7, 1999	Kitt Peak	Spacewatch	·	1.6 km	MPC · JPL
523974	1999 CD_{145}	—	February 8, 1999	Kitt Peak	Spacewatch	·	2.5 km	MPC · JPL
523975	1999 CG_{145}	—	February 8, 1999	Kitt Peak	Spacewatch	EOS	1.6 km	MPC · JPL
523976	1999 CS_{148}	—	February 10, 1999	Kitt Peak	Spacewatch	·	2.3 km	MPC · JPL
523977	1999 ET_{2}	—	March 10, 1999	Kitt Peak	Spacewatch	H	600 m	MPC · JPL
523978	1999 EZ_{10}	—	March 14, 1999	Kitt Peak	Spacewatch	EOS	2.3 km	MPC · JPL
523979	1999 FS_{15}	—	March 20, 1999	Kitt Peak	Spacewatch	URS	3.9 km	MPC · JPL
523980	1999 GY_{55}	—	March 27, 1995	Kitt Peak	Spacewatch	MAR	1.1 km	MPC · JPL
523981	1999 NE_{51}	—	July 13, 1999	Socorro	LINEAR	PHO	1.3 km	MPC · JPL
523982	1999 RY_{5}	—	September 3, 1999	Kitt Peak	Spacewatch	·	2.9 km	MPC · JPL
523983	1999 RY_{214}	—	September 6, 1999	Mauna Kea	D. C. Jewitt, J. X. Luu, C. A. Trujillo	cubewano (hot) · moon	159 km	MPC · JPL
523984	1999 RA_{251}	—	September 5, 1999	Kitt Peak	Spacewatch	V	590 m	MPC · JPL
523985	1999 TX_{45}	—	October 3, 1999	Kitt Peak	Spacewatch	·	2.2 km	MPC · JPL
523986	1999 TO_{53}	—	September 30, 1999	Kitt Peak	Spacewatch	·	890 m	MPC · JPL
523987	1999 TO_{58}	—	October 6, 1999	Kitt Peak	Spacewatch	·	1.7 km	MPC · JPL
523988	1999 TN_{59}	—	October 6, 1999	Socorro	LINEAR	·	1.0 km	MPC · JPL
523989	1999 TP_{68}	—	October 9, 1999	Kitt Peak	Spacewatch	·	1.2 km	MPC · JPL
523990	1999 TA_{70}	—	October 9, 1999	Kitt Peak	Spacewatch	·	3.1 km	MPC · JPL
523991	1999 TA_{74}	—	October 3, 1999	Kitt Peak	Spacewatch	·	1.6 km	MPC · JPL
523992	1999 TO_{74}	—	October 10, 1999	Kitt Peak	Spacewatch	·	2.4 km	MPC · JPL
523993	1999 TU_{77}	—	October 7, 1999	Kitt Peak	Spacewatch	PHO	810 m	MPC · JPL
523994	1999 TF_{80}	—	October 11, 1999	Kitt Peak	Spacewatch	AGN	910 m	MPC · JPL
523995	1999 TT_{81}	—	October 12, 1999	Kitt Peak	Spacewatch	·	2.3 km	MPC · JPL
523996	1999 TL_{128}	—	October 5, 1999	Socorro	LINEAR	·	1.7 km	MPC · JPL
523997	1999 TJ_{132}	—	September 18, 1999	Kitt Peak	Spacewatch	·	1.7 km	MPC · JPL
523998	1999 TK_{135}	—	October 6, 1999	Socorro	LINEAR	·	980 m	MPC · JPL
523999	1999 TN_{182}	—	October 10, 1999	Socorro	LINEAR	(2076)	1.0 km	MPC · JPL
524000	1999 TV_{303}	—	October 4, 1999	Kitt Peak	Spacewatch	·	780 m	MPC · JPL

back to top

== Meaning of names ==
As minor planet discoveries are confirmed, they are given a permanent number by the IAU's Minor Planet Center (MPC), and the discoverers can then submit names for them, following the IAU's naming conventions. The list below concerns those minor planets in the specified number-range that have received names, and explains the meanings of those names.

Official naming citations of newly named small Solar System bodies are approved and published in a bulletin by IAU's Working Group for Small Bodies Nomenclature (WGSBN). Before May 2021, citations were published in MPC's Minor Planet Circulars for many decades. Recent citations can also be found on the JPL Small-Body Database (SBDB). Until his death in 2016, German astronomer Lutz D. Schmadel compiled these citations into the Dictionary of Minor Planet Names (DMP) and regularly updated the collection.

Based on Paul Herget's The Names of the Minor Planets, Schmadel also researched the unclear origin of numerous asteroids, most of which had been named prior to World War II. This article incorporates text from this source, which is in the public domain: SBDB New namings may only be added to this list below after official publication as the preannouncement of names is condemned. The WGSBN publishes a comprehensive guideline for the naming rules of non-cometary small Solar System bodies.

Named minor planet	Provisional	This minor planet was named for...	Ref · Catalog
523954 Guman	1998 UF_{23}	István Guman (1919–2019) was a Hungarian astronomer who studied variable stars using photographic measurements at the Konkoly Observatory and solar astronomy in the Debrecen Heliophysical Observatory. He was an active science communicator and contributor to the Hungarian Astronomical Almanac for many decades.	JPL · 523954
