= List of minor planets: 499001–500000 =

The following is a partial list of minor planets, running from minor-planet number 499001 through 500000, inclusive. The primary data for this and other partial lists is based on JPL's "Small-Body Orbital Elements" and data available from the Minor Planet Center. Critical list information is also provided by the MPC, unless otherwise specified from Lowell Observatory. A detailed description of the table's columns and additional sources are given on the main page including a complete list of every page in this series, and a statistical break-up on the dynamical classification of minor planets.

Also see the summary list of all named bodies in numerical and alphabetical order, and the corresponding naming citations for the number range of this particular list. New namings may only be added to this list after official publication, as the preannouncement of names is condemned by the Working Group for Small Bodies Nomenclature of the International Astronomical Union.

Near-Earth obj.	MBA (inner)	MBA (outer)	Centaur
Mars-crosser	MBA (middle)	Jupiter trojan	Trans-Neptunian obj.
Unclassified

== 499001–499100 ==
Designation			Discovery			Properties		Ref
Permanent	Provisional	Named after	Date	Site	Discoverer(s)	Category	Diam.	Ref
499001	2009 CH_{25}	—	February 1, 2009	Kitt Peak	Spacewatch	·	1.2 km	MPC · JPL
499002	2009 CK_{27}	—	February 1, 2009	Kitt Peak	Spacewatch	·	620 m	MPC · JPL
499003	2009 CK_{29}	—	January 17, 2009	Kitt Peak	Spacewatch	·	650 m	MPC · JPL
499004	2009 CU_{29}	—	February 1, 2009	Kitt Peak	Spacewatch	·	910 m	MPC · JPL
499005	2009 CM_{30}	—	February 1, 2009	Kitt Peak	Spacewatch	·	2.2 km	MPC · JPL
499006	2009 CS_{32}	—	February 1, 2009	Kitt Peak	Spacewatch	·	730 m	MPC · JPL
499007	2009 CK_{37}	—	November 20, 2007	Mount Lemmon	Mount Lemmon Survey	·	2.9 km	MPC · JPL
499008	2009 CV_{38}	—	November 3, 2007	Mount Lemmon	Mount Lemmon Survey	EOS	1.7 km	MPC · JPL
499009	2009 CX_{41}	—	January 20, 2009	Kitt Peak	Spacewatch	·	860 m	MPC · JPL
499010	2009 CE_{44}	—	February 14, 2009	Kitt Peak	Spacewatch	·	800 m	MPC · JPL
499011	2009 CW_{45}	—	February 14, 2009	Kitt Peak	Spacewatch	·	2.2 km	MPC · JPL
499012	2009 CS_{48}	—	December 29, 2008	Kitt Peak	Spacewatch	·	510 m	MPC · JPL
499013	2009 CW_{50}	—	February 14, 2009	La Sagra	OAM	·	3.4 km	MPC · JPL
499014	2009 CP_{51}	—	February 21, 2009	Socorro	LINEAR	·	2.7 km	MPC · JPL
499015	2009 CL_{52}	—	January 25, 2009	Kitt Peak	Spacewatch	·	630 m	MPC · JPL
499016	2009 CS_{52}	—	January 16, 2009	Kitt Peak	Spacewatch	·	2.2 km	MPC · JPL
499017	2009 CZ_{55}	—	February 1, 2009	Kitt Peak	Spacewatch	·	630 m	MPC · JPL
499018	2009 CK_{60}	—	February 3, 2009	Kitt Peak	Spacewatch	·	2.5 km	MPC · JPL
499019	2009 CV_{60}	—	December 30, 2008	Mount Lemmon	Mount Lemmon Survey	·	2.0 km	MPC · JPL
499020	2009 CF_{62}	—	February 3, 2009	Kitt Peak	Spacewatch	(2076)	740 m	MPC · JPL
499021	2009 CR_{62}	—	February 13, 2009	Mount Lemmon	Mount Lemmon Survey	·	2.5 km	MPC · JPL
499022	2009 DK_{8}	—	January 30, 2009	Mount Lemmon	Mount Lemmon Survey	·	550 m	MPC · JPL
499023	2009 DC_{18}	—	February 19, 2009	Kitt Peak	Spacewatch	·	3.3 km	MPC · JPL
499024	2009 DS_{18}	—	February 4, 2009	Kitt Peak	Spacewatch	·	3.4 km	MPC · JPL
499025	2009 DG_{20}	—	January 15, 2009	Kitt Peak	Spacewatch	·	1.7 km	MPC · JPL
499026	2009 DR_{20}	—	January 18, 2009	Kitt Peak	Spacewatch	·	2.2 km	MPC · JPL
499027	2009 DG_{21}	—	February 2, 2009	Mount Lemmon	Mount Lemmon Survey	·	2.8 km	MPC · JPL
499028	2009 DA_{22}	—	January 31, 2009	Kitt Peak	Spacewatch	·	2.4 km	MPC · JPL
499029	2009 DW_{28}	—	September 27, 2006	Kitt Peak	Spacewatch	·	2.5 km	MPC · JPL
499030	2009 DL_{29}	—	February 23, 2009	Calar Alto	F. Hormuth	·	500 m	MPC · JPL
499031	2009 DR_{42}	—	February 26, 2009	Catalina	CSS	·	840 m	MPC · JPL
499032	2009 DG_{44}	—	November 9, 2004	Catalina	CSS	·	790 m	MPC · JPL
499033	2009 DQ_{44}	—	February 20, 2009	Catalina	CSS	VER	2.9 km	MPC · JPL
499034	2009 DD_{49}	—	November 4, 2007	Kitt Peak	Spacewatch	·	2.1 km	MPC · JPL
499035	2009 DM_{53}	—	January 31, 2009	Kitt Peak	Spacewatch	·	650 m	MPC · JPL
499036	2009 DU_{53}	—	February 1, 2009	Kitt Peak	Spacewatch	NYS	800 m	MPC · JPL
499037	2009 DV_{55}	—	February 22, 2009	Kitt Peak	Spacewatch	·	2.5 km	MPC · JPL
499038	2009 DF_{57}	—	February 4, 2009	Mount Lemmon	Mount Lemmon Survey	·	530 m	MPC · JPL
499039	2009 DH_{57}	—	February 4, 2009	Mount Lemmon	Mount Lemmon Survey	·	2.7 km	MPC · JPL
499040	2009 DM_{58}	—	February 22, 2009	Kitt Peak	Spacewatch	·	660 m	MPC · JPL
499041	2009 DU_{58}	—	February 22, 2009	Kitt Peak	Spacewatch	·	2.4 km	MPC · JPL
499042	2009 DN_{59}	—	February 22, 2009	Mount Lemmon	Mount Lemmon Survey	(1118)	2.9 km	MPC · JPL
499043	2009 DO_{62}	—	January 25, 2009	Kitt Peak	Spacewatch	·	2.5 km	MPC · JPL
499044	2009 DG_{63}	—	February 22, 2009	Kitt Peak	Spacewatch	TIR	2.7 km	MPC · JPL
499045	2009 DO_{64}	—	February 22, 2009	Kitt Peak	Spacewatch	·	880 m	MPC · JPL
499046	2009 DY_{64}	—	January 15, 2009	Kitt Peak	Spacewatch	·	1.3 km	MPC · JPL
499047	2009 DD_{65}	—	January 31, 2009	Kitt Peak	Spacewatch	·	2.5 km	MPC · JPL
499048	2009 DK_{77}	—	February 3, 2009	Mount Lemmon	Mount Lemmon Survey	·	640 m	MPC · JPL
499049	2009 DK_{86}	—	February 19, 2009	Kitt Peak	Spacewatch	·	750 m	MPC · JPL
499050	2009 DY_{87}	—	February 27, 2009	Kitt Peak	Spacewatch	·	2.0 km	MPC · JPL
499051	2009 DF_{91}	—	January 25, 2009	Kitt Peak	Spacewatch	·	2.6 km	MPC · JPL
499052	2009 DR_{91}	—	February 19, 2009	Kitt Peak	Spacewatch	·	560 m	MPC · JPL
499053	2009 DQ_{94}	—	October 10, 2007	Mount Lemmon	Mount Lemmon Survey	·	1.6 km	MPC · JPL
499054	2009 DS_{98}	—	February 26, 2009	Kitt Peak	Spacewatch	·	2.2 km	MPC · JPL
499055	2009 DT_{105}	—	February 26, 2009	Kitt Peak	Spacewatch	MAS	530 m	MPC · JPL
499056	2009 DO_{116}	—	February 4, 2009	Mount Lemmon	Mount Lemmon Survey	·	650 m	MPC · JPL
499057	2009 DY_{117}	—	February 27, 2009	Kitt Peak	Spacewatch	·	630 m	MPC · JPL
499058	2009 DC_{118}	—	January 31, 2009	Mount Lemmon	Mount Lemmon Survey	·	2.9 km	MPC · JPL
499059	2009 DD_{119}	—	August 28, 2006	Kitt Peak	Spacewatch	VER	2.7 km	MPC · JPL
499060	2009 DT_{119}	—	February 27, 2009	Kitt Peak	Spacewatch	NYS	820 m	MPC · JPL
499061	2009 DG_{122}	—	February 27, 2009	Kitt Peak	Spacewatch	·	1.0 km	MPC · JPL
499062	2009 DK_{127}	—	February 20, 2009	Kitt Peak	Spacewatch	·	940 m	MPC · JPL
499063	2009 DE_{128}	—	February 21, 2009	Kitt Peak	Spacewatch	·	1.6 km	MPC · JPL
499064	2009 DM_{129}	—	February 27, 2009	Kitt Peak	Spacewatch	·	2.4 km	MPC · JPL
499065	2009 DP_{132}	—	January 19, 2009	Mount Lemmon	Mount Lemmon Survey	·	2.8 km	MPC · JPL
499066	2009 DT_{132}	—	February 26, 2009	Kitt Peak	Spacewatch	VER	2.4 km	MPC · JPL
499067	2009 DC_{133}	—	February 4, 2005	Mount Lemmon	Mount Lemmon Survey	NYS	1.0 km	MPC · JPL
499068	2009 DV_{139}	—	February 16, 2009	Kitt Peak	Spacewatch	·	2.5 km	MPC · JPL
499069	2009 EH	—	March 1, 2009	Tzec Maun	Tozzi, F.	·	4.9 km	MPC · JPL
499070	2009 EF_{5}	—	January 19, 2009	Mount Lemmon	Mount Lemmon Survey	·	550 m	MPC · JPL
499071	2009 EU_{7}	—	February 14, 2009	Kitt Peak	Spacewatch	EOS	2.0 km	MPC · JPL
499072	2009 ET_{10}	—	March 1, 2009	Kitt Peak	Spacewatch	MAS	550 m	MPC · JPL
499073	2009 EB_{22}	—	April 2, 2006	Kitt Peak	Spacewatch	·	600 m	MPC · JPL
499074	2009 EE_{24}	—	March 1, 2009	Kitt Peak	Spacewatch	VER	2.3 km	MPC · JPL
499075	2009 EJ_{26}	—	February 24, 2009	Kitt Peak	Spacewatch	ERI	1.4 km	MPC · JPL
499076	2009 EG_{29}	—	March 2, 2009	Kitt Peak	Spacewatch	EOS	1.9 km	MPC · JPL
499077	2009 EZ_{29}	—	March 1, 2009	Mount Lemmon	Mount Lemmon Survey	·	760 m	MPC · JPL
499078	2009 FA_{1}	—	February 26, 2009	Mount Lemmon	Mount Lemmon Survey	·	860 m	MPC · JPL
499079	2009 FQ_{3}	—	March 17, 2009	Heppenheim	Starkenburg	·	2.0 km	MPC · JPL
499080	2009 FE_{4}	—	February 28, 2009	Mount Lemmon	Mount Lemmon Survey	·	860 m	MPC · JPL
499081	2009 FG_{6}	—	March 3, 2009	Mount Lemmon	Mount Lemmon Survey	·	2.2 km	MPC · JPL
499082	2009 FX_{7}	—	March 1, 2009	Kitt Peak	Spacewatch	·	670 m	MPC · JPL
499083	2009 FZ_{11}	—	February 13, 2009	Kitt Peak	Spacewatch	·	3.7 km	MPC · JPL
499084	2009 FQ_{13}	—	February 19, 2009	Kitt Peak	Spacewatch	EOS	2.0 km	MPC · JPL
499085	2009 FA_{15}	—	February 1, 2009	Kitt Peak	Spacewatch	·	650 m	MPC · JPL
499086	2009 FK_{16}	—	January 30, 2009	Mount Lemmon	Mount Lemmon Survey	·	2.4 km	MPC · JPL
499087	2009 FR_{18}	—	March 19, 2009	La Sagra	OAM	·	910 m	MPC · JPL
499088	2009 FZ_{19}	—	March 16, 2009	Kanab	Sheridan, E.	·	3.3 km	MPC · JPL
499089	2009 FT_{37}	—	March 1, 2009	Kitt Peak	Spacewatch	·	1.1 km	MPC · JPL
499090	2009 FV_{38}	—	March 17, 2009	La Sagra	OAM	T_{j} (2.95)	4.0 km	MPC · JPL
499091	2009 FA_{41}	—	December 29, 2008	Mount Lemmon	Mount Lemmon Survey	·	3.0 km	MPC · JPL
499092	2009 FV_{42}	—	March 28, 2009	Catalina	CSS	EUP	3.9 km	MPC · JPL
499093	2009 FY_{47}	—	February 5, 2009	Mount Lemmon	Mount Lemmon Survey	·	1.1 km	MPC · JPL
499094	2009 FQ_{49}	—	March 1, 2009	Kitt Peak	Spacewatch	·	3.1 km	MPC · JPL
499095	2009 FB_{55}	—	March 21, 2009	Kitt Peak	Spacewatch	·	1.1 km	MPC · JPL
499096	2009 FK_{58}	—	February 26, 2009	Kitt Peak	Spacewatch	·	490 m	MPC · JPL
499097	2009 FE_{64}	—	March 21, 2009	Kitt Peak	Spacewatch	·	810 m	MPC · JPL
499098	2009 FF_{70}	—	March 19, 2009	Kitt Peak	Spacewatch	·	890 m	MPC · JPL
499099	2009 FG_{70}	—	January 15, 2005	Kitt Peak	Spacewatch	·	850 m	MPC · JPL
499100	2009 FV_{70}	—	March 23, 2009	XuYi	PMO NEO Survey Program	·	940 m	MPC · JPL

== 499101–499200 ==
back to top

Designation			Discovery			Properties		Ref
Permanent	Provisional	Named after	Date	Site	Discoverer(s)	Category	Diam.	Ref
499101	2009 FA_{76}	—	March 19, 2009	Catalina	CSS	·	1.5 km	MPC · JPL
499102	2009 GQ_{2}	—	March 19, 2009	Kitt Peak	Spacewatch	·	1.1 km	MPC · JPL
499103	2009 GF_{4}	—	March 21, 2009	Kitt Peak	Spacewatch	·	1.1 km	MPC · JPL
499104	2009 GA_{5}	—	April 2, 2009	Mount Lemmon	Mount Lemmon Survey	·	900 m	MPC · JPL
499105	2009 HU_{3}	—	April 17, 2009	Kitt Peak	Spacewatch	·	2.1 km	MPC · JPL
499106	2009 HP_{9}	—	April 2, 2009	Kitt Peak	Spacewatch	·	840 m	MPC · JPL
499107	2009 HJ_{11}	—	April 18, 2009	Mount Lemmon	Mount Lemmon Survey	·	1.3 km	MPC · JPL
499108	2009 HC_{15}	—	April 18, 2009	Kitt Peak	Spacewatch	·	3.5 km	MPC · JPL
499109	2009 HU_{15}	—	March 2, 2009	Mount Lemmon	Mount Lemmon Survey	·	2.8 km	MPC · JPL
499110	2009 HQ_{23}	—	March 31, 2009	Mount Lemmon	Mount Lemmon Survey	·	2.2 km	MPC · JPL
499111	2009 HX_{28}	—	March 18, 2009	Kitt Peak	Spacewatch	·	900 m	MPC · JPL
499112	2009 HP_{42}	—	April 20, 2009	Kitt Peak	Spacewatch	·	530 m	MPC · JPL
499113	2009 HZ_{54}	—	April 20, 2009	Kitt Peak	Spacewatch	L5	7.7 km	MPC · JPL
499114	2009 HJ_{74}	—	March 21, 2009	Catalina	CSS	·	1.2 km	MPC · JPL
499115	2009 HX_{75}	—	March 19, 2009	Kitt Peak	Spacewatch	·	1.2 km	MPC · JPL
499116	2009 HF_{78}	—	April 24, 2009	Mount Lemmon	Mount Lemmon Survey	·	860 m	MPC · JPL
499117	2009 HZ_{93}	—	April 27, 2009	XuYi	PMO NEO Survey Program	·	1.0 km	MPC · JPL
499118	2009 HY_{97}	—	April 19, 2009	Mount Lemmon	Mount Lemmon Survey	·	2.9 km	MPC · JPL
499119	2009 HW_{98}	—	April 20, 2009	Mount Lemmon	Mount Lemmon Survey	·	2.1 km	MPC · JPL
499120	2009 HA_{104}	—	April 20, 2009	Mount Lemmon	Mount Lemmon Survey	·	890 m	MPC · JPL
499121	2009 HJ_{105}	—	March 21, 2009	Kitt Peak	Spacewatch	·	820 m	MPC · JPL
499122	2009 JE_{11}	—	May 14, 2009	Siding Spring	SSS	·	1.3 km	MPC · JPL
499123	2009 KZ_{2}	—	May 20, 2009	Mayhill	Lowe, A.	·	1.3 km	MPC · JPL
499124	2009 KA_{10}	—	May 14, 2009	Kitt Peak	Spacewatch	·	1.1 km	MPC · JPL
499125	2009 KC_{19}	—	May 28, 2009	Mount Lemmon	Mount Lemmon Survey	MAS	630 m	MPC · JPL
499126	2009 KG_{30}	—	May 28, 2009	Mount Lemmon	Mount Lemmon Survey	NYS	1.0 km	MPC · JPL
499127	2009 LE_{1}	—	May 16, 2009	Kitt Peak	Spacewatch	·	1.1 km	MPC · JPL
499128	2009 OV_{22}	—	July 20, 2009	Siding Spring	SSS	·	2.0 km	MPC · JPL
499129	2009 PC_{9}	—	October 3, 2005	Kitt Peak	Spacewatch	·	560 m	MPC · JPL
499130	2009 PN_{9}	—	August 15, 2009	Kitt Peak	Spacewatch	·	680 m	MPC · JPL
499131	2009 PC_{10}	—	July 14, 2009	Kitt Peak	Spacewatch	T_{j} (2.95)	3.6 km	MPC · JPL
499132	2009 PZ_{19}	—	August 15, 2009	Kitt Peak	Spacewatch	T_{j} (2.98)	3.2 km	MPC · JPL
499133	2009 QA_{22}	—	August 20, 2009	La Sagra	OAM	·	1.2 km	MPC · JPL
499134	2009 QW_{30}	—	September 29, 2005	Catalina	CSS	(194)	1.1 km	MPC · JPL
499135	2009 QC_{33}	—	August 18, 2009	La Sagra	OAM	H	680 m	MPC · JPL
499136	2009 QO_{33}	—	July 29, 2009	Catalina	CSS	H	620 m	MPC · JPL
499137	2009 QX_{36}	—	August 30, 2009	Altschwendt	W. Ries	·	1.2 km	MPC · JPL
499138	2009 QC_{41}	—	August 26, 2009	Catalina	CSS	T_{j} (2.98)	3.7 km	MPC · JPL
499139	2009 QT_{62}	—	August 26, 2009	La Sagra	OAM	·	1.1 km	MPC · JPL
499140	2009 RL_{1}	—	September 10, 2009	La Sagra	OAM	·	960 m	MPC · JPL
499141	2009 RZ_{7}	—	September 12, 2009	Kitt Peak	Spacewatch	·	1.3 km	MPC · JPL
499142	2009 RJ_{12}	—	September 12, 2009	Kitt Peak	Spacewatch	(5) · critical	1.6 km	MPC · JPL
499143	2009 RE_{16}	—	September 12, 2009	Kitt Peak	Spacewatch	·	1.2 km	MPC · JPL
499144	2009 RT_{16}	—	September 12, 2009	Kitt Peak	Spacewatch	·	840 m	MPC · JPL
499145	2009 RF_{19}	—	September 13, 2009	Purple Mountain	PMO NEO Survey Program	·	940 m	MPC · JPL
499146	2009 RC_{29}	—	September 14, 2009	Kitt Peak	Spacewatch	·	930 m	MPC · JPL
499147	2009 RL_{45}	—	September 15, 2009	Kitt Peak	Spacewatch	(5)	710 m	MPC · JPL
499148	2009 RT_{49}	—	September 15, 2009	Kitt Peak	Spacewatch	KON	1.8 km	MPC · JPL
499149	2009 RG_{51}	—	September 15, 2009	Kitt Peak	Spacewatch	·	1.2 km	MPC · JPL
499150	2009 RY_{51}	—	September 15, 2009	Kitt Peak	Spacewatch	·	720 m	MPC · JPL
499151	2009 RC_{55}	—	April 23, 2007	Mount Lemmon	Mount Lemmon Survey	·	2.4 km	MPC · JPL
499152	2009 RB_{62}	—	September 14, 2009	Kitt Peak	Spacewatch	(194)	2.4 km	MPC · JPL
499153	2009 RF_{71}	—	September 15, 2009	Kitt Peak	Spacewatch	·	910 m	MPC · JPL
499154	2009 SM_{2}	—	June 29, 2005	Kitt Peak	Spacewatch	·	1.1 km	MPC · JPL
499155	2009 SK_{31}	—	September 16, 2009	Kitt Peak	Spacewatch	·	1.4 km	MPC · JPL
499156	2009 SW_{34}	—	September 16, 2009	Kitt Peak	Spacewatch	·	1.0 km	MPC · JPL
499157	2009 SC_{36}	—	September 16, 2009	Kitt Peak	Spacewatch	(5)	850 m	MPC · JPL
499158	2009 SC_{44}	—	November 25, 2005	Kitt Peak	Spacewatch	·	1.3 km	MPC · JPL
499159	2009 SJ_{46}	—	September 16, 2009	Kitt Peak	Spacewatch	·	1.2 km	MPC · JPL
499160	2009 SL_{50}	—	August 16, 2009	Kitt Peak	Spacewatch	·	900 m	MPC · JPL
499161	2009 SR_{50}	—	September 17, 2009	Kitt Peak	Spacewatch	·	660 m	MPC · JPL
499162	2009 SN_{54}	—	September 17, 2009	Mount Lemmon	Mount Lemmon Survey	3:2	4.4 km	MPC · JPL
499163	2009 SK_{61}	—	September 17, 2009	Kitt Peak	Spacewatch	KON	1.8 km	MPC · JPL
499164	2009 SC_{66}	—	September 17, 2009	Kitt Peak	Spacewatch	·	800 m	MPC · JPL
499165	2009 SV_{67}	—	September 17, 2009	Kitt Peak	Spacewatch	·	1.3 km	MPC · JPL
499166	2009 SL_{69}	—	September 17, 2009	Kitt Peak	Spacewatch	H	440 m	MPC · JPL
499167	2009 SG_{70}	—	September 17, 2009	Mount Lemmon	Mount Lemmon Survey	(5)	790 m	MPC · JPL
499168	2009 SB_{74}	—	September 17, 2009	Kitt Peak	Spacewatch	·	1.0 km	MPC · JPL
499169	2009 SX_{97}	—	September 20, 2009	Mount Lemmon	Mount Lemmon Survey	·	990 m	MPC · JPL
499170	2009 SP_{98}	—	September 23, 2009	Mayhill	Nevski, V.	·	1.3 km	MPC · JPL
499171	2009 SD_{103}	—	September 25, 2009	La Sagra	OAM	·	3.8 km	MPC · JPL
499172	2009 SY_{103}	—	September 25, 2009	La Sagra	OAM	H	550 m	MPC · JPL
499173	2009 SJ_{129}	—	September 18, 2009	Kitt Peak	Spacewatch	·	510 m	MPC · JPL
499174	2009 SG_{132}	—	September 18, 2009	Kitt Peak	Spacewatch	·	1.6 km	MPC · JPL
499175	2009 SW_{136}	—	September 18, 2009	Kitt Peak	Spacewatch	KON	1.8 km	MPC · JPL
499176	2009 SJ_{148}	—	September 30, 2005	Kitt Peak	Spacewatch	·	810 m	MPC · JPL
499177	2009 SU_{166}	—	September 22, 2009	Kitt Peak	Spacewatch	H	660 m	MPC · JPL
499178	2009 SA_{188}	—	September 21, 2009	Kitt Peak	Spacewatch	(5)	750 m	MPC · JPL
499179	2009 ST_{188}	—	September 21, 2009	Kitt Peak	Spacewatch	·	690 m	MPC · JPL
499180	2009 SN_{203}	—	September 22, 2009	Kitt Peak	Spacewatch	(5)	880 m	MPC · JPL
499181	2009 SK_{204}	—	October 29, 2005	Kitt Peak	Spacewatch	RAF	610 m	MPC · JPL
499182	2009 SG_{212}	—	September 15, 2009	Kitt Peak	Spacewatch	·	1.5 km	MPC · JPL
499183	2009 SZ_{228}	—	September 23, 2009	Mount Lemmon	Mount Lemmon Survey	·	890 m	MPC · JPL
499184	2009 SU_{233}	—	September 22, 2009	Kitt Peak	Spacewatch	·	1.7 km	MPC · JPL
499185	2009 SR_{250}	—	September 19, 2009	Kitt Peak	Spacewatch	·	760 m	MPC · JPL
499186	2009 SS_{290}	—	September 17, 2009	Kitt Peak	Spacewatch	(5)	1.1 km	MPC · JPL
499187	2009 SR_{291}	—	August 27, 2009	Kitt Peak	Spacewatch	·	1.4 km	MPC · JPL
499188	2009 SS_{310}	—	September 18, 2009	Kitt Peak	Spacewatch	·	1.1 km	MPC · JPL
499189	2009 SV_{336}	—	November 4, 2005	Kitt Peak	Spacewatch	·	1.2 km	MPC · JPL
499190	2009 SP_{338}	—	September 30, 2009	Mount Lemmon	Mount Lemmon Survey	·	1.9 km	MPC · JPL
499191	2009 SN_{347}	—	September 28, 2009	Mount Lemmon	Mount Lemmon Survey	·	990 m	MPC · JPL
499192	2009 SR_{350}	—	September 27, 2009	Catalina	CSS	·	1.4 km	MPC · JPL
499193	2009 SJ_{351}	—	September 16, 2009	Kitt Peak	Spacewatch	·	1.0 km	MPC · JPL
499194	2009 SW_{351}	—	September 20, 2009	Mount Lemmon	Mount Lemmon Survey	H	440 m	MPC · JPL
499195	2009 SG_{352}	—	September 30, 2009	Mount Lemmon	Mount Lemmon Survey	·	660 m	MPC · JPL
499196	2009 SE_{358}	—	September 20, 2009	Socorro	LINEAR	H	560 m	MPC · JPL
499197	2009 SW_{358}	—	September 18, 2009	Catalina	CSS	·	1.4 km	MPC · JPL
499198	2009 SD_{361}	—	September 28, 2009	Catalina	CSS	EUN	1.1 km	MPC · JPL
499199	2009 SE_{363}	—	September 16, 2009	Kitt Peak	Spacewatch	·	830 m	MPC · JPL
499200	2009 TS_{3}	—	October 11, 2009	Mount Lemmon	Mount Lemmon Survey	·	1.5 km	MPC · JPL

== 499201–499300 ==
back to top

Designation			Discovery			Properties		Ref
Permanent	Provisional	Named after	Date	Site	Discoverer(s)	Category	Diam.	Ref
499201	2009 TX_{4}	—	September 22, 2009	Kitt Peak	Spacewatch	H	470 m	MPC · JPL
499202	2009 TP_{30}	—	October 1, 2005	Kitt Peak	Spacewatch	·	1.2 km	MPC · JPL
499203	2009 TM_{44}	—	October 15, 2009	La Sagra	OAM	·	1.2 km	MPC · JPL
499204	2009 UB_{3}	—	September 25, 2009	Catalina	CSS	·	2.7 km	MPC · JPL
499205	2009 UO_{7}	—	October 16, 2009	Mount Lemmon	Mount Lemmon Survey	·	950 m	MPC · JPL
499206	2009 UJ_{11}	—	October 16, 2009	Mount Lemmon	Mount Lemmon Survey	·	900 m	MPC · JPL
499207	2009 UY_{15}	—	October 18, 2009	La Sagra	OAM	H	610 m	MPC · JPL
499208	2009 UH_{20}	—	September 16, 2009	Mount Lemmon	Mount Lemmon Survey	H	560 m	MPC · JPL
499209	2009 UW_{23}	—	September 29, 2009	Mount Lemmon	Mount Lemmon Survey	H	440 m	MPC · JPL
499210	2009 UK_{30}	—	September 23, 2009	Mount Lemmon	Mount Lemmon Survey	EUN	990 m	MPC · JPL
499211	2009 UT_{35}	—	September 19, 2009	Mount Lemmon	Mount Lemmon Survey	·	1.7 km	MPC · JPL
499212	2009 UT_{37}	—	October 22, 2009	Mount Lemmon	Mount Lemmon Survey	·	930 m	MPC · JPL
499213	2009 UC_{40}	—	October 14, 2009	XuYi	PMO NEO Survey Program	H	610 m	MPC · JPL
499214	2009 US_{45}	—	October 18, 2009	Mount Lemmon	Mount Lemmon Survey	(5)	790 m	MPC · JPL
499215	2009 UP_{46}	—	October 18, 2009	Mount Lemmon	Mount Lemmon Survey	EUN	1.0 km	MPC · JPL
499216	2009 UQ_{51}	—	October 22, 2009	Mount Lemmon	Mount Lemmon Survey	·	910 m	MPC · JPL
499217	2009 UX_{51}	—	October 30, 2005	Mount Lemmon	Mount Lemmon Survey	(5)	1.0 km	MPC · JPL
499218	2009 UC_{57}	—	October 23, 2009	Mount Lemmon	Mount Lemmon Survey	·	840 m	MPC · JPL
499219	2009 UA_{73}	—	September 22, 2009	Mount Lemmon	Mount Lemmon Survey	·	1.2 km	MPC · JPL
499220	2009 UB_{80}	—	November 12, 2005	Kitt Peak	Spacewatch	(5)	1.1 km	MPC · JPL
499221	2009 UC_{84}	—	September 19, 2009	Mount Lemmon	Mount Lemmon Survey	·	1.1 km	MPC · JPL
499222	2009 UH_{85}	—	October 23, 2009	Mount Lemmon	Mount Lemmon Survey	·	1.1 km	MPC · JPL
499223	2009 UO_{86}	—	October 18, 2009	Mount Lemmon	Mount Lemmon Survey	EUN	1.0 km	MPC · JPL
499224	2009 US_{88}	—	September 22, 2009	Catalina	CSS	·	1.3 km	MPC · JPL
499225	2009 UQ_{89}	—	October 25, 2009	Catalina	CSS	·	990 m	MPC · JPL
499226	2009 UH_{91}	—	October 18, 2009	La Sagra	OAM	·	1.9 km	MPC · JPL
499227	2009 UC_{98}	—	October 23, 2009	Mount Lemmon	Mount Lemmon Survey	L4	7.5 km	MPC · JPL
499228	2009 UL_{103}	—	October 24, 2009	Kitt Peak	Spacewatch	·	980 m	MPC · JPL
499229	2009 UT_{103}	—	September 27, 2009	Mount Lemmon	Mount Lemmon Survey	·	1.7 km	MPC · JPL
499230	2009 UX_{110}	—	October 23, 2009	Kitt Peak	Spacewatch	·	1.0 km	MPC · JPL
499231	2009 UC_{112}	—	October 25, 2009	Kitt Peak	Spacewatch	L4	9.1 km	MPC · JPL
499232	2009 UJ_{118}	—	October 25, 2005	Kitt Peak	Spacewatch	·	1.1 km	MPC · JPL
499233	2009 UO_{119}	—	October 23, 2009	Mount Lemmon	Mount Lemmon Survey	(5)	620 m	MPC · JPL
499234	2009 UD_{122}	—	October 26, 2009	Mount Lemmon	Mount Lemmon Survey	·	1.9 km	MPC · JPL
499235	2009 UZ_{122}	—	October 26, 2009	Mount Lemmon	Mount Lemmon Survey	·	1.1 km	MPC · JPL
499236	2009 UO_{129}	—	October 26, 2009	Mount Lemmon	Mount Lemmon Survey	H	510 m	MPC · JPL
499237	2009 UM_{131}	—	September 19, 2009	Catalina	CSS	·	1.3 km	MPC · JPL
499238	2009 UC_{133}	—	October 18, 2001	Kitt Peak	Spacewatch	·	590 m	MPC · JPL
499239	2009 UK_{137}	—	October 26, 2009	Kitt Peak	Spacewatch	·	1.6 km	MPC · JPL
499240	2009 UE_{141}	—	October 27, 2009	La Sagra	OAM	·	1.0 km	MPC · JPL
499241	2009 US_{141}	—	October 24, 2009	Kitt Peak	Spacewatch	·	850 m	MPC · JPL
499242	2009 UW_{141}	—	October 16, 2009	Mount Lemmon	Mount Lemmon Survey	·	1.0 km	MPC · JPL
499243	2009 UA_{143}	—	October 18, 2009	Mount Lemmon	Mount Lemmon Survey	·	780 m	MPC · JPL
499244	2009 UJ_{145}	—	October 16, 2009	Catalina	CSS	H	510 m	MPC · JPL
499245	2009 UX_{147}	—	October 18, 2009	Mount Lemmon	Mount Lemmon Survey	·	1.2 km	MPC · JPL
499246	2009 UF_{148}	—	October 21, 2009	Mount Lemmon	Mount Lemmon Survey	·	1.3 km	MPC · JPL
499247	2009 UR_{148}	—	October 23, 2009	Mount Lemmon	Mount Lemmon Survey	(5)	720 m	MPC · JPL
499248	2009 UC_{149}	—	October 24, 2009	Kitt Peak	Spacewatch	(5)	700 m	MPC · JPL
499249	2009 UQ_{149}	—	October 26, 2009	Kitt Peak	Spacewatch	·	870 m	MPC · JPL
499250	2009 UG_{152}	—	October 24, 2009	Socorro	LINEAR	·	1.4 km	MPC · JPL
499251	2009 VK	—	November 6, 2009	Catalina	CSS	·	1.9 km	MPC · JPL
499252	2009 VZ_{2}	—	November 9, 2009	Socorro	LINEAR	·	1.6 km	MPC · JPL
499253	2009 VT_{3}	—	November 8, 2009	Kitt Peak	Spacewatch	·	1.3 km	MPC · JPL
499254	2009 VN_{4}	—	November 8, 2009	Kitt Peak	Spacewatch	(5)	580 m	MPC · JPL
499255	2009 VZ_{4}	—	November 8, 2009	Kitt Peak	Spacewatch	·	1.6 km	MPC · JPL
499256	2009 VP_{5}	—	November 8, 2009	Kitt Peak	Spacewatch	(5)	1.1 km	MPC · JPL
499257	2009 VS_{6}	—	October 24, 2009	Kitt Peak	Spacewatch	·	930 m	MPC · JPL
499258	2009 VV_{9}	—	October 14, 2009	Kitt Peak	Spacewatch	·	1.1 km	MPC · JPL
499259	2009 VU_{23}	—	November 9, 2009	Mount Lemmon	Mount Lemmon Survey	(5)	1.1 km	MPC · JPL
499260	2009 VA_{28}	—	November 22, 2005	Kitt Peak	Spacewatch	·	850 m	MPC · JPL
499261	2009 VJ_{28}	—	October 23, 2009	Kitt Peak	Spacewatch	·	2.0 km	MPC · JPL
499262	2009 VE_{29}	—	November 9, 2009	Kitt Peak	Spacewatch	ADE	1.5 km	MPC · JPL
499263	2009 VD_{33}	—	September 21, 2009	Mount Lemmon	Mount Lemmon Survey	EUN	1.1 km	MPC · JPL
499264	2009 VM_{35}	—	September 19, 2009	Mount Lemmon	Mount Lemmon Survey	MAR	990 m	MPC · JPL
499265	2009 VQ_{39}	—	November 11, 2009	La Sagra	OAM	HNS	1.7 km	MPC · JPL
499266	2009 VZ_{41}	—	October 30, 2009	Mount Lemmon	Mount Lemmon Survey	·	1.4 km	MPC · JPL
499267	2009 VG_{47}	—	November 9, 2009	Mount Lemmon	Mount Lemmon Survey	·	940 m	MPC · JPL
499268	2009 VM_{47}	—	November 9, 2009	Mount Lemmon	Mount Lemmon Survey	·	1.3 km	MPC · JPL
499269	2009 VN_{49}	—	August 28, 2009	Kitt Peak	Spacewatch	·	1.2 km	MPC · JPL
499270	2009 VS_{54}	—	October 23, 2009	Mount Lemmon	Mount Lemmon Survey	·	1.6 km	MPC · JPL
499271	2009 VW_{57}	—	October 23, 2009	Mount Lemmon	Mount Lemmon Survey	WAT	1.9 km	MPC · JPL
499272	2009 VB_{58}	—	October 27, 2009	Kitt Peak	Spacewatch	·	1.1 km	MPC · JPL
499273	2009 VU_{61}	—	November 8, 2009	Kitt Peak	Spacewatch	·	990 m	MPC · JPL
499274	2009 VD_{62}	—	November 8, 2009	Kitt Peak	Spacewatch	·	1.5 km	MPC · JPL
499275	2009 VG_{62}	—	October 22, 2009	Mount Lemmon	Mount Lemmon Survey	·	1.0 km	MPC · JPL
499276	2009 VH_{66}	—	November 9, 2009	Kitt Peak	Spacewatch	·	1.7 km	MPC · JPL
499277	2009 VN_{68}	—	December 29, 2005	Kitt Peak	Spacewatch	·	1.1 km	MPC · JPL
499278	2009 VS_{68}	—	January 6, 2006	Kitt Peak	Spacewatch	·	1.4 km	MPC · JPL
499279	2009 VW_{70}	—	November 9, 2009	Kitt Peak	Spacewatch	·	2.0 km	MPC · JPL
499280	2009 VD_{72}	—	November 14, 2009	Socorro	LINEAR	·	970 m	MPC · JPL
499281	2009 VS_{75}	—	November 13, 2009	La Sagra	OAM	·	1.2 km	MPC · JPL
499282	2009 VX_{75}	—	October 28, 2009	La Sagra	OAM	·	1.7 km	MPC · JPL
499283	2009 VH_{79}	—	November 10, 2009	Catalina	CSS	·	1.2 km	MPC · JPL
499284	2009 VF_{92}	—	September 19, 2009	Mount Lemmon	Mount Lemmon Survey	ADE	2.5 km	MPC · JPL
499285	2009 VY_{93}	—	October 24, 2009	Catalina	CSS	·	1.3 km	MPC · JPL
499286	2009 VH_{95}	—	October 16, 2009	Mount Lemmon	Mount Lemmon Survey	·	1.2 km	MPC · JPL
499287	2009 VC_{99}	—	November 29, 2005	Mount Lemmon	Mount Lemmon Survey	·	2.2 km	MPC · JPL
499288	2009 VA_{113}	—	November 9, 2009	Kitt Peak	Spacewatch	·	1.4 km	MPC · JPL
499289	2009 VB_{114}	—	November 9, 2009	Mount Lemmon	Mount Lemmon Survey	·	2.3 km	MPC · JPL
499290	2009 VE_{116}	—	November 10, 2009	Kitt Peak	Spacewatch	EUN	1.3 km	MPC · JPL
499291	2009 WD_{1}	—	January 8, 2002	Socorro	LINEAR	(5)	1.0 km	MPC · JPL
499292	2009 WR_{5}	—	November 16, 2009	La Sagra	OAM	·	1.2 km	MPC · JPL
499293	2009 WS_{6}	—	October 16, 2009	Mount Lemmon	Mount Lemmon Survey	·	1.2 km	MPC · JPL
499294	2009 WU_{7}	—	November 8, 2009	Mount Lemmon	Mount Lemmon Survey	EUN	1.8 km	MPC · JPL
499295	2009 WR_{8}	—	October 30, 2009	Mount Lemmon	Mount Lemmon Survey	·	1.9 km	MPC · JPL
499296	2009 WT_{8}	—	October 15, 2009	Socorro	LINEAR	·	1.2 km	MPC · JPL
499297	2009 WH_{11}	—	November 19, 2009	Kitt Peak	Spacewatch	·	1.6 km	MPC · JPL
499298	2009 WP_{14}	—	November 16, 2009	Mount Lemmon	Mount Lemmon Survey	(5)	1.4 km	MPC · JPL
499299	2009 WN_{15}	—	November 16, 2009	Mount Lemmon	Mount Lemmon Survey	·	1.3 km	MPC · JPL
499300	2009 WB_{20}	—	November 17, 2009	Mount Lemmon	Mount Lemmon Survey	·	1.7 km	MPC · JPL

== 499301–499400 ==
back to top

Designation			Discovery			Properties		Ref
Permanent	Provisional	Named after	Date	Site	Discoverer(s)	Category	Diam.	Ref
499301	2009 WZ_{22}	—	October 26, 2009	Kitt Peak	Spacewatch	·	1.7 km	MPC · JPL
499302	2009 WZ_{25}	—	November 22, 2009	Mayhill	Lowe, A.	·	840 m	MPC · JPL
499303	2009 WT_{32}	—	November 16, 2009	Kitt Peak	Spacewatch	·	1.1 km	MPC · JPL
499304	2009 WH_{33}	—	November 16, 2009	Kitt Peak	Spacewatch	·	1.6 km	MPC · JPL
499305	2009 WJ_{36}	—	September 21, 2009	Mount Lemmon	Mount Lemmon Survey	·	850 m	MPC · JPL
499306	2009 WZ_{36}	—	November 17, 2009	Kitt Peak	Spacewatch	·	1.4 km	MPC · JPL
499307	2009 WC_{52}	—	November 22, 2009	Catalina	CSS	AMO	650 m	MPC · JPL
499308	2009 WP_{53}	—	October 27, 2009	Mount Lemmon	Mount Lemmon Survey	slow	1.6 km	MPC · JPL
499309	2009 WA_{70}	—	October 12, 2009	Mount Lemmon	Mount Lemmon Survey	·	1.4 km	MPC · JPL
499310	2009 WC_{71}	—	November 10, 2009	Kitt Peak	Spacewatch	·	2.1 km	MPC · JPL
499311	2009 WD_{73}	—	November 18, 2009	Kitt Peak	Spacewatch	·	810 m	MPC · JPL
499312	2009 WH_{75}	—	November 18, 2009	Kitt Peak	Spacewatch	·	920 m	MPC · JPL
499313	2009 WX_{79}	—	November 18, 2009	Kitt Peak	Spacewatch	(5)	1.0 km	MPC · JPL
499314	2009 WO_{84}	—	November 19, 2009	Kitt Peak	Spacewatch	(5)	980 m	MPC · JPL
499315	2009 WH_{86}	—	November 19, 2009	Kitt Peak	Spacewatch	·	1.9 km	MPC · JPL
499316	2009 WG_{89}	—	September 20, 2009	Mount Lemmon	Mount Lemmon Survey	·	890 m	MPC · JPL
499317	2009 WH_{103}	—	November 22, 2009	Catalina	CSS	·	1.1 km	MPC · JPL
499318	2009 WR_{116}	—	November 20, 2009	Kitt Peak	Spacewatch	·	900 m	MPC · JPL
499319	2009 WU_{125}	—	November 20, 2009	Kitt Peak	Spacewatch	EOS	1.6 km	MPC · JPL
499320	2009 WO_{128}	—	November 20, 2009	Kitt Peak	Spacewatch	MIS	2.2 km	MPC · JPL
499321	2009 WW_{130}	—	October 27, 2009	Mount Lemmon	Mount Lemmon Survey	·	2.4 km	MPC · JPL
499322	2009 WV_{133}	—	November 22, 2009	Catalina	CSS	·	930 m	MPC · JPL
499323	2009 WB_{144}	—	November 19, 2009	Kitt Peak	Spacewatch	·	2.8 km	MPC · JPL
499324	2009 WK_{144}	—	November 19, 2009	Mount Lemmon	Mount Lemmon Survey	·	970 m	MPC · JPL
499325	2009 WF_{149}	—	September 22, 2009	Mount Lemmon	Mount Lemmon Survey	·	1.1 km	MPC · JPL
499326	2009 WJ_{153}	—	November 19, 2009	Mount Lemmon	Mount Lemmon Survey	·	900 m	MPC · JPL
499327	2009 WQ_{154}	—	November 19, 2009	Mount Lemmon	Mount Lemmon Survey	·	1.2 km	MPC · JPL
499328	2009 WR_{155}	—	December 22, 2005	Catalina	CSS	·	920 m	MPC · JPL
499329	2009 WR_{159}	—	November 9, 2009	Mount Lemmon	Mount Lemmon Survey	·	2.8 km	MPC · JPL
499330	2009 WA_{161}	—	November 9, 2009	Mount Lemmon	Mount Lemmon Survey	·	1.0 km	MPC · JPL
499331	2009 WA_{172}	—	November 11, 2009	Kitt Peak	Spacewatch	·	2.7 km	MPC · JPL
499332	2009 WE_{178}	—	December 28, 2005	Kitt Peak	Spacewatch	(11882)	1.6 km	MPC · JPL
499333	2009 WU_{189}	—	October 26, 2009	Mount Lemmon	Mount Lemmon Survey	·	1.3 km	MPC · JPL
499334	2009 WA_{201}	—	November 26, 2009	Mount Lemmon	Mount Lemmon Survey	(5)	1.0 km	MPC · JPL
499335	2009 WE_{201}	—	November 26, 2009	Mount Lemmon	Mount Lemmon Survey	·	1.4 km	MPC · JPL
499336	2009 WN_{208}	—	November 17, 2009	Kitt Peak	Spacewatch	·	1.0 km	MPC · JPL
499337	2009 WA_{209}	—	November 9, 2009	Kitt Peak	Spacewatch	·	1.6 km	MPC · JPL
499338	2009 WG_{209}	—	November 8, 2009	Catalina	CSS	·	1.4 km	MPC · JPL
499339	2009 WA_{213}	—	November 18, 2009	Kitt Peak	Spacewatch	EUN	1.5 km	MPC · JPL
499340	2009 WK_{214}	—	November 8, 2009	Kitt Peak	Spacewatch	·	1.6 km	MPC · JPL
499341	2009 WY_{215}	—	November 17, 2009	Kitt Peak	Spacewatch	·	2.0 km	MPC · JPL
499342	2009 WS_{217}	—	December 25, 2005	Kitt Peak	Spacewatch	·	1.1 km	MPC · JPL
499343	2009 WL_{224}	—	November 8, 2009	Kitt Peak	Spacewatch	·	1.6 km	MPC · JPL
499344	2009 WX_{224}	—	November 16, 2009	Mount Lemmon	Mount Lemmon Survey	·	2.3 km	MPC · JPL
499345	2009 WU_{242}	—	November 19, 2009	Kitt Peak	Spacewatch	·	1.4 km	MPC · JPL
499346	2009 WB_{245}	—	November 20, 2009	Mount Lemmon	Mount Lemmon Survey	·	1.1 km	MPC · JPL
499347	2009 WC_{247}	—	November 26, 2009	Catalina	CSS	·	1.4 km	MPC · JPL
499348	2009 WU_{250}	—	November 25, 2009	Kitt Peak	Spacewatch	·	1.2 km	MPC · JPL
499349	2009 WC_{254}	—	November 17, 2009	Kitt Peak	Spacewatch	·	2.4 km	MPC · JPL
499350	2009 WL_{254}	—	November 17, 2009	Kitt Peak	Spacewatch	·	1.3 km	MPC · JPL
499351	2009 WO_{260}	—	November 26, 2009	Kitt Peak	Spacewatch	·	2.6 km	MPC · JPL
499352	2009 WB_{261}	—	November 25, 2009	Mount Lemmon	Mount Lemmon Survey	·	1.2 km	MPC · JPL
499353	2009 WL_{261}	—	February 2, 2006	Mount Lemmon	Mount Lemmon Survey	·	2.2 km	MPC · JPL
499354	2009 XW_{15}	—	November 17, 2009	Mount Lemmon	Mount Lemmon Survey	·	1.4 km	MPC · JPL
499355	2009 XY_{15}	—	October 26, 2009	Mount Lemmon	Mount Lemmon Survey	·	2.6 km	MPC · JPL
499356	2009 XN_{18}	—	November 21, 2009	Mount Lemmon	Mount Lemmon Survey	·	1.6 km	MPC · JPL
499357	2009 XT_{18}	—	November 11, 2009	Mount Lemmon	Mount Lemmon Survey	·	2.3 km	MPC · JPL
499358	2009 XA_{23}	—	December 15, 2009	Mount Lemmon	Mount Lemmon Survey	·	1.8 km	MPC · JPL
499359	2009 YX	—	November 21, 2009	Kitt Peak	Spacewatch	·	2.5 km	MPC · JPL
499360	2009 YH_{4}	—	October 27, 2009	Mount Lemmon	Mount Lemmon Survey	JUN	930 m	MPC · JPL
499361	2009 YP_{4}	—	December 17, 2009	Mount Lemmon	Mount Lemmon Survey	·	1.3 km	MPC · JPL
499362	2009 YQ_{7}	—	December 16, 2009	Kitt Peak	Spacewatch	(5)	1.8 km	MPC · JPL
499363	2009 YZ_{16}	—	December 10, 2009	Mount Lemmon	Mount Lemmon Survey	EUN	1.5 km	MPC · JPL
499364	2009 YJ_{20}	—	November 17, 2009	Mount Lemmon	Mount Lemmon Survey	·	1.2 km	MPC · JPL
499365	2009 YL_{20}	—	December 26, 2009	Kitt Peak	Spacewatch	·	1.9 km	MPC · JPL
499366	2009 YO_{21}	—	December 19, 2009	Mount Lemmon	Mount Lemmon Survey	·	1.0 km	MPC · JPL
499367 Monikasirp	2010 AB	Monikasirp	January 5, 2010	Sierra Stars	R. Kracht	·	990 m	MPC · JPL
499368	2010 AT_{1}	—	January 4, 2010	Kitt Peak	Spacewatch	·	1.5 km	MPC · JPL
499369	2010 AY_{1}	—	December 20, 2009	Kitt Peak	Spacewatch	·	2.4 km	MPC · JPL
499370	2010 AJ_{10}	—	December 19, 2009	Mount Lemmon	Mount Lemmon Survey	·	2.5 km	MPC · JPL
499371	2010 AO_{12}	—	January 6, 2010	Kitt Peak	Spacewatch	JUN	1.1 km	MPC · JPL
499372	2010 AN_{24}	—	January 6, 2010	Kitt Peak	Spacewatch	·	1.5 km	MPC · JPL
499373	2010 AO_{24}	—	January 6, 2010	Kitt Peak	Spacewatch	·	2.5 km	MPC · JPL
499374	2010 AB_{40}	—	December 20, 2009	Kitt Peak	Spacewatch	H	650 m	MPC · JPL
499375	2010 AZ_{43}	—	December 17, 2009	Kitt Peak	Spacewatch	·	2.0 km	MPC · JPL
499376	2010 AU_{54}	—	January 8, 2010	Kitt Peak	Spacewatch	·	1.9 km	MPC · JPL
499377	2010 AY_{55}	—	January 8, 2010	Kitt Peak	Spacewatch	·	2.2 km	MPC · JPL
499378	2010 AO_{65}	—	January 11, 2010	Kitt Peak	Spacewatch	·	2.7 km	MPC · JPL
499379	2010 AX_{65}	—	January 11, 2010	Kitt Peak	Spacewatch	·	2.8 km	MPC · JPL
499380	2010 AK_{71}	—	January 12, 2010	Mount Lemmon	Mount Lemmon Survey	·	3.0 km	MPC · JPL
499381	2010 AU_{72}	—	November 19, 1995	Kitt Peak	Spacewatch	AEO	990 m	MPC · JPL
499382	2010 AR_{73}	—	October 14, 2009	Mount Lemmon	Mount Lemmon Survey	·	2.3 km	MPC · JPL
499383	2010 AB_{74}	—	December 20, 2009	Kitt Peak	Spacewatch	·	1.2 km	MPC · JPL
499384	2010 AE_{76}	—	January 13, 2010	Socorro	LINEAR	·	1.2 km	MPC · JPL
499385	2010 AX_{78}	—	January 7, 2010	Catalina	CSS	·	2.9 km	MPC · JPL
499386	2010 AQ_{79}	—	January 5, 2010	Kitt Peak	Spacewatch	·	1.9 km	MPC · JPL
499387	2010 AW_{85}	—	January 8, 2010	WISE	WISE	·	3.2 km	MPC · JPL
499388	2010 AD_{89}	—	January 8, 2010	WISE	WISE	·	3.1 km	MPC · JPL
499389	2010 AR_{90}	—	February 12, 2004	Kitt Peak	Spacewatch	·	5.0 km	MPC · JPL
499390	2010 AK_{93}	—	April 4, 2010	Catalina	CSS	·	3.6 km	MPC · JPL
499391	2010 AA_{131}	—	January 15, 2010	WISE	WISE	·	5.3 km	MPC · JPL
499392	2010 BF	—	December 26, 2009	Kitt Peak	Spacewatch	EUP	4.3 km	MPC · JPL
499393	2010 BA_{2}	—	January 6, 2010	Catalina	CSS	·	1.4 km	MPC · JPL
499394	2010 BN_{2}	—	November 21, 2009	Mount Lemmon	Mount Lemmon Survey	·	1.1 km	MPC · JPL
499395	2010 BK_{9}	—	January 16, 2010	WISE	WISE	LUT	3.5 km	MPC · JPL
499396	2010 BK_{26}	—	January 18, 2010	WISE	WISE	·	3.2 km	MPC · JPL
499397	2010 BV_{29}	—	May 6, 2010	Catalina	CSS	·	3.8 km	MPC · JPL
499398	2010 BF_{48}	—	January 20, 2010	WISE	WISE	·	5.4 km	MPC · JPL
499399	2010 BA_{55}	—	September 28, 2009	Mount Lemmon	Mount Lemmon Survey	critical	1.3 km	MPC · JPL
499400	2010 BZ_{58}	—	March 19, 2010	Kitt Peak	Spacewatch	·	2.5 km	MPC · JPL

== 499401–499500 ==
back to top

Designation			Discovery			Properties		Ref
Permanent	Provisional	Named after	Date	Site	Discoverer(s)	Category	Diam.	Ref
499401	2010 BL_{71}	—	January 22, 2010	WISE	WISE	·	3.2 km	MPC · JPL
499402	2010 BJ_{74}	—	January 23, 2010	WISE	WISE	·	4.4 km	MPC · JPL
499403	2010 BQ_{77}	—	February 16, 2004	Kitt Peak	Spacewatch	·	3.2 km	MPC · JPL
499404	2010 BH_{81}	—	January 25, 2010	WISE	WISE	·	3.9 km	MPC · JPL
499405	2010 BG_{87}	—	January 26, 2010	WISE	WISE	·	4.3 km	MPC · JPL
499406	2010 BU_{98}	—	May 22, 2010	Mount Lemmon	Mount Lemmon Survey	EUP	3.2 km	MPC · JPL
499407	2010 BZ_{127}	—	July 25, 2010	WISE	WISE	EUP	4.2 km	MPC · JPL
499408	2010 CW_{2}	—	February 5, 2010	Kitt Peak	Spacewatch	·	1.6 km	MPC · JPL
499409	2010 CL_{9}	—	February 8, 2010	WISE	WISE	·	3.1 km	MPC · JPL
499410	2010 CA_{25}	—	January 15, 2010	Kitt Peak	Spacewatch	·	1.5 km	MPC · JPL
499411	2010 CH_{25}	—	January 11, 2010	Kitt Peak	Spacewatch	T_{j} (2.97)	2.9 km	MPC · JPL
499412	2010 CC_{29}	—	February 9, 2010	Kitt Peak	Spacewatch	·	2.9 km	MPC · JPL
499413	2010 CS_{35}	—	February 10, 2010	Kitt Peak	Spacewatch	T_{j} (2.98) · EUP	3.6 km	MPC · JPL
499414	2010 CB_{39}	—	January 8, 2010	Mount Lemmon	Mount Lemmon Survey	EUP	2.9 km	MPC · JPL
499415	2010 CQ_{42}	—	February 6, 2010	La Sagra	OAM	·	1.8 km	MPC · JPL
499416	2010 CE_{56}	—	September 24, 2008	Mount Lemmon	Mount Lemmon Survey	·	2.4 km	MPC · JPL
499417	2010 CH_{57}	—	February 14, 2010	Socorro	LINEAR	·	1.4 km	MPC · JPL
499418	2010 CU_{58}	—	February 17, 2010	Mount Lemmon	Mount Lemmon Survey	·	2.3 km	MPC · JPL
499419	2010 CQ_{65}	—	February 9, 2010	Kitt Peak	Spacewatch	·	3.2 km	MPC · JPL
499420	2010 CU_{73}	—	February 13, 2010	Mount Lemmon	Mount Lemmon Survey	ADE	2.7 km	MPC · JPL
499421	2010 CF_{78}	—	February 17, 2001	Kitt Peak	Spacewatch	·	1.4 km	MPC · JPL
499422	2010 CU_{82}	—	February 13, 2010	Kitt Peak	Spacewatch	·	2.0 km	MPC · JPL
499423	2010 CQ_{92}	—	February 14, 2010	Kitt Peak	Spacewatch	·	3.5 km	MPC · JPL
499424	2010 CX_{109}	—	May 6, 2006	Kitt Peak	Spacewatch	KOR	1.2 km	MPC · JPL
499425	2010 CL_{116}	—	February 14, 2010	Mount Lemmon	Mount Lemmon Survey	·	1.6 km	MPC · JPL
499426	2010 CN_{120}	—	November 17, 2009	Kitt Peak	Spacewatch	·	1.6 km	MPC · JPL
499427	2010 CV_{126}	—	February 15, 2010	Mount Lemmon	Mount Lemmon Survey	·	1.8 km	MPC · JPL
499428	2010 CE_{164}	—	February 10, 2010	Kitt Peak	Spacewatch	·	2.0 km	MPC · JPL
499429	2010 CT_{173}	—	February 9, 2010	Kitt Peak	Spacewatch	·	3.7 km	MPC · JPL
499430	2010 CS_{175}	—	February 9, 2010	Kitt Peak	Spacewatch	·	2.2 km	MPC · JPL
499431	2010 CX_{175}	—	February 9, 2010	Kitt Peak	Spacewatch	·	2.3 km	MPC · JPL
499432	2010 CQ_{176}	—	February 10, 2010	Kitt Peak	Spacewatch	·	2.4 km	MPC · JPL
499433	2010 CF_{180}	—	January 12, 2010	Catalina	CSS	·	1.4 km	MPC · JPL
499434	2010 CN_{181}	—	February 14, 2010	Haleakala	Pan-STARRS 1	·	3.2 km	MPC · JPL
499435	2010 CB_{185}	—	February 12, 2010	Socorro	LINEAR	·	2.1 km	MPC · JPL
499436	2010 CL_{203}	—	May 6, 2010	Mount Lemmon	Mount Lemmon Survey	·	4.3 km	MPC · JPL
499437	2010 CB_{216}	—	October 11, 2004	Kitt Peak	Spacewatch	·	2.3 km	MPC · JPL
499438	2010 CL_{244}	—	July 25, 2010	WISE	WISE	·	4.1 km	MPC · JPL
499439	2010 CW_{244}	—	November 11, 2005	Kitt Peak	Spacewatch	·	1.6 km	MPC · JPL
499440	2010 DP_{23}	—	February 18, 2010	WISE	WISE	·	3.9 km	MPC · JPL
499441	2010 DM_{37}	—	February 16, 2010	Kitt Peak	Spacewatch	TRE	3.2 km	MPC · JPL
499442	2010 DG_{78}	—	February 20, 2010	Siding Spring	SSS	·	450 m	MPC · JPL
499443	2010 ED_{7}	—	March 3, 2010	WISE	WISE	EUP	4.1 km	MPC · JPL
499444	2010 EW_{27}	—	March 11, 2010	WISE	WISE	·	2.1 km	MPC · JPL
499445	2010 EC_{36}	—	March 11, 2010	La Sagra	OAM	·	2.4 km	MPC · JPL
499446	2010 EF_{46}	—	December 18, 2009	Kitt Peak	Spacewatch	·	2.8 km	MPC · JPL
499447	2010 ES_{69}	—	March 13, 2010	Mount Lemmon	Mount Lemmon Survey	·	3.3 km	MPC · JPL
499448	2010 EG_{70}	—	February 19, 2010	Mount Lemmon	Mount Lemmon Survey	·	2.9 km	MPC · JPL
499449	2010 EK_{75}	—	March 10, 2005	Mount Lemmon	Mount Lemmon Survey	·	1.5 km	MPC · JPL
499450	2010 EC_{81}	—	February 15, 2010	Kitt Peak	Spacewatch	·	2.4 km	MPC · JPL
499451	2010 EB_{86}	—	January 8, 2010	Kitt Peak	Spacewatch	·	1.9 km	MPC · JPL
499452	2010 EU_{95}	—	February 18, 2010	Kitt Peak	Spacewatch	KOR	1.5 km	MPC · JPL
499453	2010 EQ_{98}	—	March 14, 2010	Kitt Peak	Spacewatch	·	3.2 km	MPC · JPL
499454	2010 EA_{101}	—	March 15, 2010	Kitt Peak	Spacewatch	·	2.5 km	MPC · JPL
499455	2010 EO_{104}	—	November 17, 2000	Kitt Peak	Spacewatch	·	1.2 km	MPC · JPL
499456	2010 EG_{106}	—	March 15, 2010	La Sagra	OAM	·	3.1 km	MPC · JPL
499457	2010 EL_{109}	—	March 4, 2010	Kitt Peak	Spacewatch	·	2.7 km	MPC · JPL
499458	2010 EU_{121}	—	March 15, 2010	Kitt Peak	Spacewatch	·	1.8 km	MPC · JPL
499459	2010 ET_{126}	—	February 18, 2010	Mount Lemmon	Mount Lemmon Survey	·	5.7 km	MPC · JPL
499460	2010 EC_{137}	—	March 13, 2010	Mount Lemmon	Mount Lemmon Survey	·	2.0 km	MPC · JPL
499461	2010 EA_{141}	—	February 18, 2010	Mount Lemmon	Mount Lemmon Survey	THB	2.8 km	MPC · JPL
499462	2010 EV_{171}	—	December 21, 2008	Kitt Peak	Spacewatch	·	3.4 km	MPC · JPL
499463	2010 FB_{1}	—	March 12, 2010	Kitt Peak	Spacewatch	EOS	1.8 km	MPC · JPL
499464	2010 FX_{4}	—	October 15, 2007	Mount Lemmon	Mount Lemmon Survey	KOR	1.8 km	MPC · JPL
499465	2010 FR_{93}	—	March 18, 2010	Kitt Peak	Spacewatch	·	530 m	MPC · JPL
499466	2010 GE_{101}	—	April 5, 2010	Kitt Peak	Spacewatch	EOS	1.7 km	MPC · JPL
499467	2010 GJ_{105}	—	April 7, 2010	Kitt Peak	Spacewatch	·	2.8 km	MPC · JPL
499468	2010 GY_{117}	—	April 10, 2010	Kitt Peak	Spacewatch	·	3.0 km	MPC · JPL
499469	2010 GA_{132}	—	April 10, 2010	Kitt Peak	Spacewatch	·	2.8 km	MPC · JPL
499470	2010 GN_{138}	—	April 6, 2010	Mount Lemmon	Mount Lemmon Survey	DOR	2.3 km	MPC · JPL
499471	2010 HO_{23}	—	April 20, 2010	Mount Lemmon	Mount Lemmon Survey	TIR	3.0 km	MPC · JPL
499472	2010 HL_{77}	—	April 19, 2010	Bergisch Gladbach	W. Bickel	LIX	4.5 km	MPC · JPL
499473	2010 JA_{9}	—	May 1, 2010	WISE	WISE	·	3.0 km	MPC · JPL
499474	2010 JG_{37}	—	May 7, 2010	Mount Lemmon	Mount Lemmon Survey	·	3.4 km	MPC · JPL
499475	2010 JC_{38}	—	May 3, 2010	Kitt Peak	Spacewatch	·	630 m	MPC · JPL
499476	2010 JZ_{47}	—	May 4, 2010	Kitt Peak	Spacewatch	·	2.4 km	MPC · JPL
499477	2010 JG_{48}	—	April 10, 2010	Kitt Peak	Spacewatch	·	530 m	MPC · JPL
499478	2010 JW_{71}	—	May 4, 2010	Kitt Peak	Spacewatch	·	640 m	MPC · JPL
499479	2010 JK_{88}	—	May 15, 2010	Mount Lemmon	Mount Lemmon Survey	H	510 m	MPC · JPL
499480	2010 JQ_{103}	—	November 21, 2003	Kitt Peak	Spacewatch	·	3.1 km	MPC · JPL
499481	2010 JF_{109}	—	February 6, 2010	Mount Lemmon	Mount Lemmon Survey	·	3.5 km	MPC · JPL
499482	2010 JY_{110}	—	May 11, 2010	Mount Lemmon	Mount Lemmon Survey	·	2.8 km	MPC · JPL
499483	2010 JK_{112}	—	March 16, 2004	Kitt Peak	Spacewatch	THM	2.2 km	MPC · JPL
499484	2010 JP_{125}	—	May 12, 2010	WISE	WISE	·	1.5 km	MPC · JPL
499485	2010 JE_{178}	—	January 30, 2009	Mount Lemmon	Mount Lemmon Survey	EOS	1.9 km	MPC · JPL
499486	2010 KB_{89}	—	February 17, 2010	Kitt Peak	Spacewatch	·	2.8 km	MPC · JPL
499487	2010 KM_{125}	—	May 31, 2010	WISE	WISE	·	1.3 km	MPC · JPL
499488	2010 LY_{67}	—	June 7, 2010	Kitt Peak	Spacewatch	·	510 m	MPC · JPL
499489	2010 LQ_{93}	—	June 12, 2010	WISE	WISE	·	1.5 km	MPC · JPL
499490	2010 MW	—	June 18, 2010	Mount Lemmon	Mount Lemmon Survey	AMO +1km	1.2 km	MPC · JPL
499491	2010 MN_{52}	—	June 24, 2010	WISE	WISE	·	1.9 km	MPC · JPL
499492	2010 MZ_{64}	—	June 24, 2010	WISE	WISE	·	1.5 km	MPC · JPL
499493	2010 MY_{65}	—	June 25, 2010	WISE	WISE	·	1.3 km	MPC · JPL
499494	2010 MM_{72}	—	June 25, 2010	WISE	WISE	·	1.2 km	MPC · JPL
499495	2010 MV_{82}	—	June 27, 2010	WISE	WISE	·	1.3 km	MPC · JPL
499496	2010 MR_{87}	—	June 22, 2010	WISE	WISE	AMO	360 m	MPC · JPL
499497	2010 MA_{94}	—	June 28, 2010	WISE	WISE	PHO	1.6 km	MPC · JPL
499498	2010 MB_{98}	—	June 28, 2010	WISE	WISE	·	1.2 km	MPC · JPL
499499	2010 NS_{2}	—	July 11, 2010	WISE	WISE	·	3.8 km	MPC · JPL
499500	2010 NG_{38}	—	March 20, 2010	Kitt Peak	Spacewatch	·	2.7 km	MPC · JPL

== 499501–499600 ==
back to top

Designation			Discovery			Properties		Ref
Permanent	Provisional	Named after	Date	Site	Discoverer(s)	Category	Diam.	Ref
499501	2010 NP_{42}	—	July 9, 2010	WISE	WISE	·	1.6 km	MPC · JPL
499502	2010 NE_{50}	—	July 9, 2010	WISE	WISE	3:2	4.1 km	MPC · JPL
499503	2010 NO_{56}	—	July 10, 2010	WISE	WISE	·	3.2 km	MPC · JPL
499504	2010 NZ_{86}	—	July 1, 2010	WISE	WISE	·	1.2 km	MPC · JPL
499505	2010 OW_{11}	—	July 17, 2010	WISE	WISE	·	1.2 km	MPC · JPL
499506	2010 OU_{14}	—	July 17, 2010	WISE	WISE	·	1.4 km	MPC · JPL
499507	2010 OX_{26}	—	May 5, 2008	Mount Lemmon	Mount Lemmon Survey	3:2 · SHU	4.2 km	MPC · JPL
499508	2010 OC_{38}	—	July 21, 2010	WISE	WISE	EUP	4.2 km	MPC · JPL
499509	2010 OX_{39}	—	July 21, 2010	WISE	WISE	·	1.2 km	MPC · JPL
499510	2010 OR_{85}	—	July 26, 2010	WISE	WISE	·	5.3 km	MPC · JPL
499511	2010 OF_{88}	—	July 27, 2010	WISE	WISE	·	1.6 km	MPC · JPL
499512	2010 OY_{103}	—	July 29, 2010	WISE	WISE	LIX	3.7 km	MPC · JPL
499513	2010 OO_{114}	—	July 30, 2010	WISE	WISE	·	1.2 km	MPC · JPL
499514	2010 OO_{127}	—	July 31, 2010	Haleakala	Pan-STARRS 1	res · 3:5	200 km	MPC · JPL
499515	2010 PQ_{24}	—	October 14, 2007	Mount Lemmon	Mount Lemmon Survey	·	620 m	MPC · JPL
499516	2010 PU_{24}	—	August 7, 2010	La Sagra	OAM	NYS	780 m	MPC · JPL
499517	2010 PX_{24}	—	August 7, 2010	La Sagra	OAM	·	730 m	MPC · JPL
499518	2010 PZ_{54}	—	February 15, 2010	WISE	WISE	·	3.7 km	MPC · JPL
499519	2010 PN_{63}	—	August 13, 2010	Socorro	LINEAR	PHO	770 m	MPC · JPL
499520	2010 PQ_{64}	—	August 10, 2010	Kitt Peak	Spacewatch	·	700 m	MPC · JPL
499521	2010 PK_{65}	—	August 10, 2010	Kitt Peak	Spacewatch	·	600 m	MPC · JPL
499522	2010 PL_{66}	—	August 14, 2010	La Silla	D. L. Rabinowitz, M. E. Schwamb, S. Tourtellotte	centaur	151 km	MPC · JPL
499523	2010 PV_{74}	—	August 11, 2010	La Sagra	OAM	·	730 m	MPC · JPL
499524	2010 PZ_{76}	—	August 11, 2010	La Sagra	OAM	·	630 m	MPC · JPL
499525	2010 PH_{77}	—	August 14, 2010	Kitt Peak	Spacewatch	·	930 m	MPC · JPL
499526 Romhányi	2010 RO_{11}	Romhányi	September 2, 2010	Piszkéstető	K. Sárneczky, Z. Kuli	·	1.6 km	MPC · JPL
499527	2010 RO_{16}	—	December 18, 2000	Kitt Peak	Spacewatch	·	750 m	MPC · JPL
499528	2010 RU_{50}	—	September 21, 2003	Kitt Peak	Spacewatch	·	460 m	MPC · JPL
499529	2010 RL_{51}	—	September 4, 2010	Kitt Peak	Spacewatch	·	860 m	MPC · JPL
499530	2010 RZ_{54}	—	September 5, 2010	La Sagra	OAM	·	650 m	MPC · JPL
499531	2010 RK_{71}	—	September 2, 2010	Mount Lemmon	Mount Lemmon Survey	·	720 m	MPC · JPL
499532	2010 RP_{73}	—	October 21, 2003	Kitt Peak	Spacewatch	NYS	870 m	MPC · JPL
499533	2010 RF_{76}	—	June 15, 2010	Mount Lemmon	Mount Lemmon Survey	·	660 m	MPC · JPL
499534	2010 RU_{81}	—	September 11, 2010	Kitt Peak	Spacewatch	·	720 m	MPC · JPL
499535	2010 RJ_{83}	—	October 25, 2005	Kitt Peak	Spacewatch	THM	2.0 km	MPC · JPL
499536	2010 RW_{88}	—	September 4, 2010	La Sagra	OAM	·	730 m	MPC · JPL
499537	2010 RN_{94}	—	November 17, 2007	Mount Lemmon	Mount Lemmon Survey	·	830 m	MPC · JPL
499538	2010 RO_{99}	—	September 10, 2010	Kitt Peak	Spacewatch	V	490 m	MPC · JPL
499539	2010 RS_{99}	—	October 18, 2003	Kitt Peak	Spacewatch	·	810 m	MPC · JPL
499540	2010 RG_{103}	—	September 10, 2010	Kitt Peak	Spacewatch	·	880 m	MPC · JPL
499541	2010 RV_{108}	—	September 11, 2010	Kitt Peak	Spacewatch	MAS	640 m	MPC · JPL
499542	2010 RL_{110}	—	September 10, 2010	La Sagra	OAM	·	690 m	MPC · JPL
499543	2010 RP_{111}	—	September 11, 2010	Kitt Peak	Spacewatch	MAS	590 m	MPC · JPL
499544	2010 RA_{114}	—	September 11, 2010	Kitt Peak	Spacewatch	·	980 m	MPC · JPL
499545	2010 RX_{115}	—	February 8, 2008	Kitt Peak	Spacewatch	NYS	1.1 km	MPC · JPL
499546	2010 RM_{119}	—	September 18, 2003	Kitt Peak	Spacewatch	NYS	890 m	MPC · JPL
499547	2010 RP_{124}	—	March 23, 2009	Mount Lemmon	Mount Lemmon Survey	·	980 m	MPC · JPL
499548	2010 RU_{125}	—	September 12, 2010	Kitt Peak	Spacewatch	NYS	750 m	MPC · JPL
499549	2010 RA_{126}	—	September 12, 2010	Kitt Peak	Spacewatch	PHO	1.0 km	MPC · JPL
499550	2010 RF_{127}	—	August 14, 2010	Kitt Peak	Spacewatch	MAS	540 m	MPC · JPL
499551	2010 RQ_{138}	—	September 16, 2003	Kitt Peak	Spacewatch	·	550 m	MPC · JPL
499552	2010 RU_{138}	—	September 11, 2010	Kitt Peak	Spacewatch	V	470 m	MPC · JPL
499553	2010 RT_{141}	—	February 13, 2008	Mount Lemmon	Mount Lemmon Survey	·	760 m	MPC · JPL
499554	2010 RM_{143}	—	September 14, 2010	Kitt Peak	Spacewatch	·	770 m	MPC · JPL
499555	2010 RV_{144}	—	September 14, 2010	Kitt Peak	Spacewatch	·	880 m	MPC · JPL
499556	2010 RW_{145}	—	June 23, 2010	Mount Lemmon	Mount Lemmon Survey	·	940 m	MPC · JPL
499557	2010 RG_{146}	—	September 4, 2010	Kitt Peak	Spacewatch	V	660 m	MPC · JPL
499558	2010 RF_{147}	—	February 9, 2008	Kitt Peak	Spacewatch	MAS	530 m	MPC · JPL
499559	2010 RX_{150}	—	September 15, 2010	Kitt Peak	Spacewatch	V	500 m	MPC · JPL
499560	2010 RR_{154}	—	November 24, 2003	Anderson Mesa	LONEOS	·	830 m	MPC · JPL
499561	2010 RD_{155}	—	September 15, 2010	Kitt Peak	Spacewatch	·	870 m	MPC · JPL
499562	2010 RM_{159}	—	September 2, 2010	Mount Lemmon	Mount Lemmon Survey	·	620 m	MPC · JPL
499563	2010 RA_{175}	—	September 9, 2010	Kitt Peak	Spacewatch	·	590 m	MPC · JPL
499564	2010 RH_{181}	—	September 3, 2010	Mount Lemmon	Mount Lemmon Survey	·	1.2 km	MPC · JPL
499565	2010 SC_{8}	—	September 4, 2010	Mount Lemmon	Mount Lemmon Survey	·	590 m	MPC · JPL
499566	2010 SE_{19}	—	September 27, 2010	Kitt Peak	Spacewatch	·	780 m	MPC · JPL
499567	2010 SR_{20}	—	September 17, 2003	Kitt Peak	Spacewatch	·	450 m	MPC · JPL
499568	2010 ST_{22}	—	September 29, 2010	Mount Lemmon	Mount Lemmon Survey	·	1.0 km	MPC · JPL
499569	2010 SK_{26}	—	September 19, 2003	Kitt Peak	Spacewatch	·	860 m	MPC · JPL
499570	2010 SR_{27}	—	October 27, 2003	Kitt Peak	Spacewatch	·	720 m	MPC · JPL
499571	2010 SV_{27}	—	September 29, 2010	Kitt Peak	Spacewatch	MAS	560 m	MPC · JPL
499572	2010 SE_{30}	—	September 17, 2010	Kitt Peak	Spacewatch	·	900 m	MPC · JPL
499573	2010 SP_{35}	—	September 15, 2010	Kitt Peak	Spacewatch	·	970 m	MPC · JPL
499574	2010 SM_{36}	—	February 8, 2008	Kitt Peak	Spacewatch	·	1.1 km	MPC · JPL
499575	2010 TG	—	September 10, 2010	Kitt Peak	Spacewatch	·	700 m	MPC · JPL
499576	2010 TA_{1}	—	November 19, 2007	Mount Lemmon	Mount Lemmon Survey	·	860 m	MPC · JPL
499577	2010 TB_{1}	—	September 15, 2010	Kitt Peak	Spacewatch	·	740 m	MPC · JPL
499578	2010 TR_{2}	—	October 2, 2010	La Sagra	OAM	·	1.4 km	MPC · JPL
499579	2010 TL_{13}	—	October 3, 2010	Kitt Peak	Spacewatch	·	1.0 km	MPC · JPL
499580	2010 TT_{15}	—	October 3, 2010	Kitt Peak	Spacewatch	·	880 m	MPC · JPL
499581	2010 TK_{17}	—	December 31, 2007	Mount Lemmon	Mount Lemmon Survey	·	820 m	MPC · JPL
499582	2010 TH_{19}	—	October 7, 2010	Catalina	CSS	AMO · APO · PHA	460 m	MPC · JPL
499583	2010 TG_{35}	—	October 8, 2010	Catalina	CSS	·	870 m	MPC · JPL
499584	2010 TH_{36}	—	October 1, 2003	Kitt Peak	Spacewatch	·	610 m	MPC · JPL
499585	2010 TF_{42}	—	October 2, 2010	Kitt Peak	Spacewatch	V	500 m	MPC · JPL
499586	2010 TB_{43}	—	September 28, 2003	Kitt Peak	Spacewatch	NYS	540 m	MPC · JPL
499587	2010 TX_{49}	—	January 30, 2008	Mount Lemmon	Mount Lemmon Survey	NYS	810 m	MPC · JPL
499588	2010 TX_{55}	—	October 9, 2010	Catalina	CSS	·	1.1 km	MPC · JPL
499589	2010 TV_{58}	—	September 16, 2010	Mount Lemmon	Mount Lemmon Survey	·	1.2 km	MPC · JPL
499590	2010 TS_{60}	—	September 19, 2010	Kitt Peak	Spacewatch	NYS	790 m	MPC · JPL
499591	2010 TA_{65}	—	September 19, 2010	Kitt Peak	Spacewatch	V	560 m	MPC · JPL
499592	2010 TV_{65}	—	October 18, 2003	Kitt Peak	Spacewatch	·	810 m	MPC · JPL
499593	2010 TL_{75}	—	October 8, 2010	Kitt Peak	Spacewatch	·	760 m	MPC · JPL
499594	2010 TQ_{87}	—	September 4, 2010	Kitt Peak	Spacewatch	·	830 m	MPC · JPL
499595	2010 TM_{92}	—	September 18, 2010	Mount Lemmon	Mount Lemmon Survey	·	780 m	MPC · JPL
499596	2010 TL_{94}	—	October 20, 2003	Kitt Peak	Spacewatch	·	570 m	MPC · JPL
499597	2010 TD_{99}	—	September 4, 2010	Kitt Peak	Spacewatch	·	720 m	MPC · JPL
499598	2010 TT_{114}	—	September 10, 2010	Kitt Peak	Spacewatch	·	510 m	MPC · JPL
499599	2010 TV_{115}	—	October 9, 2010	Catalina	CSS	H	430 m	MPC · JPL
499600	2010 TS_{120}	—	September 17, 2003	Kitt Peak	Spacewatch	·	700 m	MPC · JPL

== 499601–499700 ==
back to top

Designation			Discovery			Properties		Ref
Permanent	Provisional	Named after	Date	Site	Discoverer(s)	Category	Diam.	Ref
499601	2010 TF_{142}	—	November 20, 2003	Socorro	LINEAR	PHO	790 m	MPC · JPL
499602	2010 TK_{153}	—	October 9, 2010	Catalina	CSS	V	610 m	MPC · JPL
499603	2010 TD_{157}	—	October 10, 2010	Kitt Peak	Spacewatch	·	910 m	MPC · JPL
499604	2010 TL_{163}	—	September 17, 2010	Kitt Peak	Spacewatch	MAS	550 m	MPC · JPL
499605	2010 TK_{165}	—	December 1, 2003	Kitt Peak	Spacewatch	·	620 m	MPC · JPL
499606	2010 TK_{168}	—	September 17, 2010	Mount Lemmon	Mount Lemmon Survey	·	860 m	MPC · JPL
499607	2010 TV_{170}	—	October 23, 2003	Kitt Peak	Spacewatch	·	860 m	MPC · JPL
499608	2010 TA_{172}	—	September 30, 2006	Mount Lemmon	Mount Lemmon Survey	·	1.4 km	MPC · JPL
499609	2010 TF_{175}	—	October 7, 2010	Catalina	CSS	·	850 m	MPC · JPL
499610	2010 TK_{184}	—	October 2, 2003	Kitt Peak	Spacewatch	·	550 m	MPC · JPL
499611	2010 TD_{187}	—	September 7, 1999	Socorro	LINEAR	·	1.3 km	MPC · JPL
499612	2010 UF_{6}	—	October 17, 2010	Mount Lemmon	Mount Lemmon Survey	NYS	970 m	MPC · JPL
499613	2010 UP_{15}	—	June 18, 2006	Kitt Peak	Spacewatch	MAS	610 m	MPC · JPL
499614	2010 US_{24}	—	November 30, 2003	Kitt Peak	Spacewatch	·	740 m	MPC · JPL
499615	2010 UT_{28}	—	September 18, 2006	Anderson Mesa	LONEOS	MAS	700 m	MPC · JPL
499616	2010 UD_{36}	—	October 29, 2010	Mount Lemmon	Mount Lemmon Survey	·	1.2 km	MPC · JPL
499617	2010 UB_{41}	—	September 17, 2006	Kitt Peak	Spacewatch	·	1 km	MPC · JPL
499618	2010 UL_{50}	—	September 15, 2006	Kitt Peak	Spacewatch	·	720 m	MPC · JPL
499619	2010 UC_{52}	—	July 24, 2010	WISE	WISE	·	2.2 km	MPC · JPL
499620	2010 UG_{53}	—	October 11, 2010	Mount Lemmon	Mount Lemmon Survey	·	890 m	MPC · JPL
499621	2010 UL_{55}	—	September 17, 2006	Kitt Peak	Spacewatch	·	850 m	MPC · JPL
499622	2010 UY_{55}	—	February 12, 2008	Kitt Peak	Spacewatch	·	1.1 km	MPC · JPL
499623	2010 UO_{65}	—	October 31, 2010	Kitt Peak	Spacewatch	NYS	930 m	MPC · JPL
499624	2010 US_{80}	—	October 14, 2010	Mount Lemmon	Mount Lemmon Survey	·	950 m	MPC · JPL
499625	2010 UD_{83}	—	October 19, 2010	Mount Lemmon	Mount Lemmon Survey	·	910 m	MPC · JPL
499626	2010 UN_{83}	—	July 27, 2009	Kitt Peak	Spacewatch	3:2 · SHU	6.0 km	MPC · JPL
499627	2010 UO_{84}	—	October 30, 2010	Kitt Peak	Spacewatch	·	730 m	MPC · JPL
499628	2010 UQ_{85}	—	January 12, 2008	Mount Lemmon	Mount Lemmon Survey	·	1.1 km	MPC · JPL
499629	2010 UU_{87}	—	October 2, 2010	La Sagra	OAM	NYS	990 m	MPC · JPL
499630	2010 UT_{89}	—	September 17, 2010	Kitt Peak	Spacewatch	V	590 m	MPC · JPL
499631	2010 US_{98}	—	August 21, 2006	Kitt Peak	Spacewatch	·	910 m	MPC · JPL
499632	2010 UW_{98}	—	November 16, 2006	Kitt Peak	Spacewatch	·	1.0 km	MPC · JPL
499633	2010 UO_{99}	—	February 15, 1997	Kitt Peak	Spacewatch	·	1.3 km	MPC · JPL
499634	2010 US_{107}	—	October 13, 2010	Mount Lemmon	Mount Lemmon Survey	V	540 m	MPC · JPL
499635	2010 VD_{15}	—	October 11, 2010	Mount Lemmon	Mount Lemmon Survey	V	590 m	MPC · JPL
499636	2010 VS_{15}	—	October 17, 2010	Mount Lemmon	Mount Lemmon Survey	V	600 m	MPC · JPL
499637	2010 VP_{20}	—	October 2, 2010	Kitt Peak	Spacewatch	NYS	890 m	MPC · JPL
499638	2010 VP_{22}	—	October 28, 2010	Kitt Peak	Spacewatch	·	940 m	MPC · JPL
499639	2010 VQ_{24}	—	September 18, 2010	Mount Lemmon	Mount Lemmon Survey	NYS	1.0 km	MPC · JPL
499640	2010 VL_{26}	—	November 1, 2010	Kitt Peak	Spacewatch	NYS	860 m	MPC · JPL
499641	2010 VS_{32}	—	April 18, 2009	Mount Lemmon	Mount Lemmon Survey	NYS	930 m	MPC · JPL
499642	2010 VR_{48}	—	November 2, 2010	Kitt Peak	Spacewatch	·	850 m	MPC · JPL
499643	2010 VB_{49}	—	October 16, 2006	Mount Lemmon	Mount Lemmon Survey	V	530 m	MPC · JPL
499644	2010 VG_{53}	—	September 11, 2010	Mount Lemmon	Mount Lemmon Survey	NYS	750 m	MPC · JPL
499645	2010 VZ_{57}	—	October 30, 2010	Kitt Peak	Spacewatch	·	1.0 km	MPC · JPL
499646	2010 VW_{61}	—	November 5, 2010	Mount Lemmon	Mount Lemmon Survey	·	1.2 km	MPC · JPL
499647	2010 VP_{67}	—	February 10, 2008	Kitt Peak	Spacewatch	·	750 m	MPC · JPL
499648	2010 VC_{71}	—	November 6, 2010	Catalina	CSS	·	1.2 km	MPC · JPL
499649	2010 VA_{78}	—	November 3, 2010	Mount Lemmon	Mount Lemmon Survey	MAS	550 m	MPC · JPL
499650	2010 VM_{83}	—	October 14, 2010	Mount Lemmon	Mount Lemmon Survey	3:2	5.3 km	MPC · JPL
499651	2010 VL_{87}	—	September 14, 2006	Catalina	CSS	NYS	870 m	MPC · JPL
499652	2010 VN_{88}	—	November 6, 2010	Kitt Peak	Spacewatch	·	670 m	MPC · JPL
499653	2010 VX_{96}	—	November 2, 2010	Kitt Peak	Spacewatch	·	1.1 km	MPC · JPL
499654	2010 VY_{96}	—	September 17, 2010	Mount Lemmon	Mount Lemmon Survey	·	810 m	MPC · JPL
499655	2010 VL_{97}	—	September 11, 2010	Mount Lemmon	Mount Lemmon Survey	NYS	940 m	MPC · JPL
499656	2010 VP_{97}	—	November 12, 1999	Socorro	LINEAR	·	940 m	MPC · JPL
499657	2010 VK_{105}	—	September 17, 2006	Kitt Peak	Spacewatch	·	880 m	MPC · JPL
499658	2010 VU_{108}	—	October 12, 2010	Mount Lemmon	Mount Lemmon Survey	·	760 m	MPC · JPL
499659	2010 VY_{114}	—	October 30, 2010	Mount Lemmon	Mount Lemmon Survey	·	930 m	MPC · JPL
499660	2010 VC_{119}	—	February 28, 2008	Kitt Peak	Spacewatch	NYS	830 m	MPC · JPL
499661	2010 VE_{124}	—	September 11, 2010	Mount Lemmon	Mount Lemmon Survey	·	1.8 km	MPC · JPL
499662	2010 VM_{127}	—	December 6, 1997	Caussols	ODAS	H	460 m	MPC · JPL
499663	2010 VT_{133}	—	November 1, 2010	Kitt Peak	Spacewatch	NYS	850 m	MPC · JPL
499664	2010 VD_{135}	—	November 5, 2010	Kitt Peak	Spacewatch	·	670 m	MPC · JPL
499665	2010 VK_{142}	—	November 6, 2010	Mount Lemmon	Mount Lemmon Survey	NYS	760 m	MPC · JPL
499666	2010 VD_{150}	—	February 18, 2008	Mount Lemmon	Mount Lemmon Survey	·	860 m	MPC · JPL
499667	2010 VZ_{156}	—	October 30, 2010	Kitt Peak	Spacewatch	·	860 m	MPC · JPL
499668	2010 VO_{161}	—	November 14, 1999	Socorro	LINEAR	NYS	900 m	MPC · JPL
499669	2010 VD_{164}	—	October 30, 1999	Kitt Peak	Spacewatch	·	630 m	MPC · JPL
499670	2010 VQ_{165}	—	February 10, 2008	Kitt Peak	Spacewatch	·	880 m	MPC · JPL
499671	2010 VT_{165}	—	October 14, 2010	Mount Lemmon	Mount Lemmon Survey	NYS	800 m	MPC · JPL
499672	2010 VK_{188}	—	October 25, 1981	Palomar	S. J. Bus	AMO	680 m	MPC · JPL
499673	2010 VD_{195}	—	February 10, 2008	Kitt Peak	Spacewatch	·	1.1 km	MPC · JPL
499674	2010 VG_{195}	—	December 22, 2003	Kitt Peak	Spacewatch	·	1.2 km	MPC · JPL
499675	2010 VC_{200}	—	November 6, 2010	Catalina	CSS	PHO	940 m	MPC · JPL
499676	2010 VF_{203}	—	October 9, 2010	Catalina	CSS	·	1.0 km	MPC · JPL
499677	2010 VT_{204}	—	September 17, 2010	Mount Lemmon	Mount Lemmon Survey	V	500 m	MPC · JPL
499678	2010 VE_{205}	—	October 9, 1999	Catalina	CSS	·	1.1 km	MPC · JPL
499679	2010 VV_{208}	—	September 17, 2010	Mount Lemmon	Mount Lemmon Survey	NYS	1.0 km	MPC · JPL
499680	2010 VF_{211}	—	September 14, 2006	Kitt Peak	Spacewatch	V	550 m	MPC · JPL
499681	2010 VM_{214}	—	October 22, 2003	Kitt Peak	Spacewatch	V	450 m	MPC · JPL
499682	2010 VO_{214}	—	February 17, 2004	Kitt Peak	Spacewatch	NYS	1.0 km	MPC · JPL
499683	2010 VZ_{217}	—	October 17, 2010	Mount Lemmon	Mount Lemmon Survey	MAS	550 m	MPC · JPL
499684	2010 VS_{219}	—	April 7, 2005	Mount Lemmon	Mount Lemmon Survey	V	610 m	MPC · JPL
499685	2010 WA_{16}	—	November 8, 2010	Kitt Peak	Spacewatch	MAS	730 m	MPC · JPL
499686	2010 WU_{22}	—	November 13, 2010	Kitt Peak	Spacewatch	·	820 m	MPC · JPL
499687	2010 WJ_{24}	—	November 24, 2006	Mount Lemmon	Mount Lemmon Survey	·	1.2 km	MPC · JPL
499688	2010 WZ_{28}	—	November 10, 2010	Mount Lemmon	Mount Lemmon Survey	·	980 m	MPC · JPL
499689	2010 WL_{45}	—	September 27, 2006	Kitt Peak	Spacewatch	·	790 m	MPC · JPL
499690	2010 WG_{48}	—	October 19, 2006	Kitt Peak	Spacewatch	·	910 m	MPC · JPL
499691	2010 WP_{49}	—	October 28, 2006	Mount Lemmon	Mount Lemmon Survey	·	830 m	MPC · JPL
499692	2010 WO_{73}	—	November 30, 2010	Mount Lemmon	Mount Lemmon Survey	NYS	870 m	MPC · JPL
499693	2010 XX_{12}	—	March 18, 2004	Kitt Peak	Spacewatch	·	1.5 km	MPC · JPL
499694	2010 XK_{33}	—	November 12, 2010	Mount Lemmon	Mount Lemmon Survey	·	1.0 km	MPC · JPL
499695	2010 XN_{53}	—	October 13, 2010	Mount Lemmon	Mount Lemmon Survey	·	910 m	MPC · JPL
499696	2010 XA_{77}	—	December 3, 2010	Mount Lemmon	Mount Lemmon Survey	·	860 m	MPC · JPL
499697	2010 XS_{88}	—	December 3, 2010	Mount Lemmon	Mount Lemmon Survey	·	1.2 km	MPC · JPL
499698	2010 YP_{3}	—	November 5, 2010	Mount Lemmon	Mount Lemmon Survey	·	1.5 km	MPC · JPL
499699	2010 YG_{5}	—	November 21, 2006	Mount Lemmon	Mount Lemmon Survey	·	1.0 km	MPC · JPL
499700	2011 AH	—	December 15, 2006	Mount Lemmon	Mount Lemmon Survey	·	1.6 km	MPC · JPL

== 499701–499800 ==
back to top

Designation			Discovery			Properties		Ref
Permanent	Provisional	Named after	Date	Site	Discoverer(s)	Category	Diam.	Ref
499701	2011 AR	—	December 14, 2010	Mount Lemmon	Mount Lemmon Survey	·	1.3 km	MPC · JPL
499702	2011 AB_{2}	—	December 8, 2010	Kitt Peak	Spacewatch	·	900 m	MPC · JPL
499703	2011 AA_{8}	—	December 10, 2006	Kitt Peak	Spacewatch	·	990 m	MPC · JPL
499704	2011 AM_{20}	—	January 8, 2011	Catalina	CSS	H	610 m	MPC · JPL
499705	2011 AA_{21}	—	January 9, 2011	Mount Lemmon	Mount Lemmon Survey	·	2.1 km	MPC · JPL
499706	2011 AZ_{24}	—	November 11, 2010	Mount Lemmon	Mount Lemmon Survey	·	1.6 km	MPC · JPL
499707	2011 AH_{31}	—	January 9, 2011	Kitt Peak	Spacewatch	·	920 m	MPC · JPL
499708	2011 AN_{35}	—	September 14, 2005	Kitt Peak	Spacewatch	·	1.1 km	MPC · JPL
499709	2011 AN_{42}	—	December 8, 2010	Mount Lemmon	Mount Lemmon Survey	·	2.1 km	MPC · JPL
499710	2011 AV_{43}	—	November 23, 2009	Mount Lemmon	Mount Lemmon Survey	3:2	4.8 km	MPC · JPL
499711	2011 AJ_{56}	—	January 10, 2011	Kitt Peak	Spacewatch	·	1.2 km	MPC · JPL
499712	2011 AD_{59}	—	November 20, 2006	Kitt Peak	Spacewatch	·	770 m	MPC · JPL
499713	2011 AU_{61}	—	December 13, 2010	Mount Lemmon	Mount Lemmon Survey	·	1.0 km	MPC · JPL
499714	2011 AJ_{65}	—	February 6, 2007	Kitt Peak	Spacewatch	(5)	1.1 km	MPC · JPL
499715	2011 AA_{66}	—	December 27, 2006	Mount Lemmon	Mount Lemmon Survey	·	1.2 km	MPC · JPL
499716	2011 AQ_{73}	—	December 25, 2010	Mount Lemmon	Mount Lemmon Survey	EUN	1.3 km	MPC · JPL
499717	2011 AS_{75}	—	January 11, 2011	Kitt Peak	Spacewatch	H	470 m	MPC · JPL
499718	2011 AL_{77}	—	December 25, 2006	Anderson Mesa	LONEOS	·	1.6 km	MPC · JPL
499719	2011 BM_{1}	—	November 7, 2010	Mount Lemmon	Mount Lemmon Survey	·	990 m	MPC · JPL
499720	2011 BV_{3}	—	January 16, 2011	Mount Lemmon	Mount Lemmon Survey	·	960 m	MPC · JPL
499721	2011 BQ_{6}	—	November 21, 2006	Mount Lemmon	Mount Lemmon Survey	·	780 m	MPC · JPL
499722	2011 BE_{7}	—	January 16, 2011	Mount Lemmon	Mount Lemmon Survey	·	1.5 km	MPC · JPL
499723	2011 BG_{7}	—	December 5, 2010	Mount Lemmon	Mount Lemmon Survey	(5)	1.1 km	MPC · JPL
499724	2011 BJ_{9}	—	January 16, 2011	Mount Lemmon	Mount Lemmon Survey	·	900 m	MPC · JPL
499725	2011 BS_{10}	—	December 8, 2010	Mount Lemmon	Mount Lemmon Survey	·	2.0 km	MPC · JPL
499726	2011 BA_{17}	—	December 10, 2010	Mount Lemmon	Mount Lemmon Survey	·	1.3 km	MPC · JPL
499727	2011 BA_{18}	—	January 25, 2011	Kitt Peak	Spacewatch	·	1.0 km	MPC · JPL
499728	2011 BK_{18}	—	January 14, 2011	Kitt Peak	Spacewatch	ADE	1.8 km	MPC · JPL
499729	2011 BD_{20}	—	January 11, 2011	Mount Lemmon	Mount Lemmon Survey	EUN	1.5 km	MPC · JPL
499730	2011 BJ_{22}	—	December 2, 2005	Mount Lemmon	Mount Lemmon Survey	·	1.4 km	MPC · JPL
499731	2011 BN_{25}	—	December 8, 2010	Mount Lemmon	Mount Lemmon Survey	·	1.1 km	MPC · JPL
499732	2011 BT_{25}	—	April 29, 2003	Kitt Peak	Spacewatch	·	1.4 km	MPC · JPL
499733	2011 BE_{29}	—	January 26, 2011	Mount Lemmon	Mount Lemmon Survey	·	1.3 km	MPC · JPL
499734	2011 BM_{29}	—	December 9, 2010	Mount Lemmon	Mount Lemmon Survey	·	1.2 km	MPC · JPL
499735	2011 BA_{36}	—	January 13, 2011	Kitt Peak	Spacewatch	HNS	1.0 km	MPC · JPL
499736	2011 BO_{39}	—	January 3, 2011	Catalina	CSS	·	1.3 km	MPC · JPL
499737	2011 BN_{46}	—	January 30, 2011	Piszkéstető	K. Sárneczky, Z. Kuli	·	1.3 km	MPC · JPL
499738	2011 BC_{59}	—	January 30, 2011	Mount Lemmon	Mount Lemmon Survey	·	2.3 km	MPC · JPL
499739	2011 BV_{61}	—	January 26, 2011	Kitt Peak	Spacewatch	·	2.0 km	MPC · JPL
499740	2011 BJ_{64}	—	January 8, 2011	Mount Lemmon	Mount Lemmon Survey	·	1.1 km	MPC · JPL
499741	2011 BG_{72}	—	February 11, 2011	Mayhill	L. Elenin	(5)	980 m	MPC · JPL
499742	2011 BW_{72}	—	February 5, 2011	Haleakala	Pan-STARRS 1	·	1.5 km	MPC · JPL
499743	2011 BQ_{74}	—	September 16, 2009	Catalina	CSS	·	1.2 km	MPC · JPL
499744	2011 BY_{76}	—	February 25, 2011	Mount Lemmon	Mount Lemmon Survey	MAR	810 m	MPC · JPL
499745	2011 BX_{80}	—	December 8, 2010	Mount Lemmon	Mount Lemmon Survey	·	1.0 km	MPC · JPL
499746	2011 BA_{82}	—	January 16, 2011	Mount Lemmon	Mount Lemmon Survey	·	1.2 km	MPC · JPL
499747	2011 BR_{91}	—	March 9, 2007	Kitt Peak	Spacewatch	·	1.2 km	MPC · JPL
499748	2011 BU_{91}	—	December 5, 2002	Socorro	LINEAR	·	1.1 km	MPC · JPL
499749	2011 BF_{93}	—	January 28, 2011	Mount Lemmon	Mount Lemmon Survey	H	430 m	MPC · JPL
499750	2011 BW_{96}	—	December 8, 2010	Mount Lemmon	Mount Lemmon Survey	·	2.0 km	MPC · JPL
499751	2011 BY_{99}	—	December 27, 2006	Mount Lemmon	Mount Lemmon Survey	·	1.2 km	MPC · JPL
499752	2011 BA_{100}	—	February 12, 2011	Mount Lemmon	Mount Lemmon Survey	·	1.0 km	MPC · JPL
499753	2011 BP_{100}	—	January 27, 2011	Catalina	CSS	(5)	1.0 km	MPC · JPL
499754	2011 BM_{101}	—	January 10, 2007	Kitt Peak	Spacewatch	·	910 m	MPC · JPL
499755	2011 BA_{105}	—	August 26, 2009	Catalina	CSS	·	1.0 km	MPC · JPL
499756	2011 BK_{109}	—	March 2, 2011	Mount Lemmon	Mount Lemmon Survey	EUN	870 m	MPC · JPL
499757	2011 BR_{111}	—	February 17, 2007	Mount Lemmon	Mount Lemmon Survey	·	1.6 km	MPC · JPL
499758	2011 BC_{112}	—	January 2, 2011	Mount Lemmon	Mount Lemmon Survey	·	1.3 km	MPC · JPL
499759	2011 BB_{118}	—	January 25, 2011	Mount Lemmon	Mount Lemmon Survey	·	1.4 km	MPC · JPL
499760	2011 BM_{144}	—	January 14, 2011	Kitt Peak	Spacewatch	·	790 m	MPC · JPL
499761	2011 BH_{157}	—	January 27, 2007	Mount Lemmon	Mount Lemmon Survey	·	860 m	MPC · JPL
499762	2011 BK_{157}	—	January 14, 2011	Kitt Peak	Spacewatch	·	1.2 km	MPC · JPL
499763	2011 CJ_{2}	—	April 14, 2008	Mount Lemmon	Mount Lemmon Survey	·	1.3 km	MPC · JPL
499764	2011 CJ_{3}	—	November 24, 2006	Mount Lemmon	Mount Lemmon Survey	·	840 m	MPC · JPL
499765	2011 CJ_{6}	—	February 5, 2011	Kitt Peak	Spacewatch	·	1.0 km	MPC · JPL
499766	2011 CU_{8}	—	January 14, 2011	Kitt Peak	Spacewatch	·	1.6 km	MPC · JPL
499767	2011 CV_{10}	—	February 5, 2011	Catalina	CSS	·	1.4 km	MPC · JPL
499768	2011 CC_{13}	—	January 11, 2011	Kitt Peak	Spacewatch	·	1.3 km	MPC · JPL
499769	2011 CG_{13}	—	February 5, 2011	Mount Lemmon	Mount Lemmon Survey	·	1.4 km	MPC · JPL
499770	2011 CH_{13}	—	January 11, 2011	Kitt Peak	Spacewatch	·	910 m	MPC · JPL
499771	2011 CM_{18}	—	November 13, 2006	Catalina	CSS	·	1.0 km	MPC · JPL
499772	2011 CQ_{21}	—	February 7, 2011	Mount Lemmon	Mount Lemmon Survey	·	1.3 km	MPC · JPL
499773	2011 CE_{24}	—	February 7, 2011	Mount Lemmon	Mount Lemmon Survey	·	810 m	MPC · JPL
499774	2011 CZ_{24}	—	January 11, 2011	Kitt Peak	Spacewatch	BRU	2.7 km	MPC · JPL
499775	2011 CZ_{27}	—	October 28, 2005	Mount Lemmon	Mount Lemmon Survey	·	1.1 km	MPC · JPL
499776	2011 CZ_{31}	—	January 28, 2011	Mount Lemmon	Mount Lemmon Survey	·	2.4 km	MPC · JPL
499777	2011 CR_{38}	—	February 5, 2011	Mount Lemmon	Mount Lemmon Survey	·	1.9 km	MPC · JPL
499778	2011 CT_{38}	—	March 12, 2007	Mount Lemmon	Mount Lemmon Survey	·	1.4 km	MPC · JPL
499779	2011 CE_{39}	—	February 5, 2011	Catalina	CSS	H	460 m	MPC · JPL
499780	2011 CS_{39}	—	November 14, 2006	Mount Lemmon	Mount Lemmon Survey	·	1.1 km	MPC · JPL
499781	2011 CO_{42}	—	December 28, 2005	Kitt Peak	Spacewatch	DOR	1.8 km	MPC · JPL
499782	2011 CE_{49}	—	March 15, 2007	Mount Lemmon	Mount Lemmon Survey	·	910 m	MPC · JPL
499783	2011 CH_{49}	—	January 30, 2011	Mount Lemmon	Mount Lemmon Survey	KON	2.1 km	MPC · JPL
499784	2011 CA_{53}	—	February 7, 2011	Mount Lemmon	Mount Lemmon Survey	(18466)	2.7 km	MPC · JPL
499785	2011 CC_{53}	—	February 7, 2011	Mount Lemmon	Mount Lemmon Survey	·	1.5 km	MPC · JPL
499786	2011 CE_{53}	—	February 7, 2011	Mount Lemmon	Mount Lemmon Survey	·	1.2 km	MPC · JPL
499787	2011 CF_{53}	—	January 26, 2011	Kitt Peak	Spacewatch	·	1.2 km	MPC · JPL
499788	2011 CL_{54}	—	October 27, 2005	Kitt Peak	Spacewatch	·	1.1 km	MPC · JPL
499789	2011 CV_{54}	—	November 25, 2009	Mount Lemmon	Mount Lemmon Survey	·	1.2 km	MPC · JPL
499790	2011 CF_{56}	—	March 14, 2007	Kitt Peak	Spacewatch	·	1.6 km	MPC · JPL
499791	2011 CJ_{58}	—	February 8, 2011	Mount Lemmon	Mount Lemmon Survey	·	1.8 km	MPC · JPL
499792	2011 CK_{60}	—	January 27, 2011	Mount Lemmon	Mount Lemmon Survey	·	1.5 km	MPC · JPL
499793	2011 CE_{70}	—	December 9, 2010	Mount Lemmon	Mount Lemmon Survey	·	1.8 km	MPC · JPL
499794	2011 CB_{71}	—	January 30, 2011	Kitt Peak	Spacewatch	H	530 m	MPC · JPL
499795	2011 CT_{72}	—	January 13, 2011	Catalina	CSS	EUN	1.5 km	MPC · JPL
499796	2011 CX_{76}	—	February 11, 2011	Mount Lemmon	Mount Lemmon Survey	·	1.6 km	MPC · JPL
499797	2011 CD_{78}	—	February 11, 2011	Mount Lemmon	Mount Lemmon Survey	H	370 m	MPC · JPL
499798	2011 CL_{78}	—	February 10, 2011	Mount Lemmon	Mount Lemmon Survey	·	1.3 km	MPC · JPL
499799	2011 CY_{84}	—	February 21, 2007	Kitt Peak	Spacewatch	·	800 m	MPC · JPL
499800	2011 CD_{85}	—	January 28, 2011	Kitt Peak	Spacewatch	·	1.5 km	MPC · JPL

== 499801–499900 ==
back to top

Designation			Discovery			Properties		Ref
Permanent	Provisional	Named after	Date	Site	Discoverer(s)	Category	Diam.	Ref
499801	2011 CC_{86}	—	January 11, 2011	Mount Lemmon	Mount Lemmon Survey	·	2.2 km	MPC · JPL
499802	2011 CX_{87}	—	March 6, 2011	Mount Lemmon	Mount Lemmon Survey	·	2.0 km	MPC · JPL
499803	2011 CE_{88}	—	January 25, 2011	Kitt Peak	Spacewatch	HNS	960 m	MPC · JPL
499804	2011 CX_{88}	—	March 1, 2011	Catalina	CSS	ADE	1.8 km	MPC · JPL
499805	2011 CB_{90}	—	March 20, 2007	Mount Lemmon	Mount Lemmon Survey	·	1.3 km	MPC · JPL
499806	2011 CZ_{90}	—	February 12, 2011	Mount Lemmon	Mount Lemmon Survey	·	1.3 km	MPC · JPL
499807	2011 CS_{91}	—	January 15, 2011	Mount Lemmon	Mount Lemmon Survey	EUN	1.2 km	MPC · JPL
499808	2011 CD_{101}	—	February 1, 2010	WISE	WISE	·	2.4 km	MPC · JPL
499809	2011 CE_{105}	—	February 21, 2007	Mount Lemmon	Mount Lemmon Survey	·	820 m	MPC · JPL
499810	2011 CT_{107}	—	February 25, 2011	Mount Lemmon	Mount Lemmon Survey	·	1.2 km	MPC · JPL
499811	2011 CW_{107}	—	February 25, 2011	Mount Lemmon	Mount Lemmon Survey	HNS	810 m	MPC · JPL
499812	2011 CD_{108}	—	March 15, 2007	Kitt Peak	Spacewatch	·	1.2 km	MPC · JPL
499813	2011 CJ_{110}	—	December 30, 2005	Kitt Peak	Spacewatch	·	1.6 km	MPC · JPL
499814	2011 CT_{112}	—	February 11, 2011	Mount Lemmon	Mount Lemmon Survey	·	1.5 km	MPC · JPL
499815	2011 CR_{115}	—	March 6, 2011	Mount Lemmon	Mount Lemmon Survey	·	2.0 km	MPC · JPL
499816	2011 DP_{7}	—	February 25, 2011	Mount Lemmon	Mount Lemmon Survey	·	1.1 km	MPC · JPL
499817	2011 DL_{8}	—	February 22, 2011	Kitt Peak	Spacewatch	·	940 m	MPC · JPL
499818	2011 DX_{9}	—	February 22, 2011	Kitt Peak	Spacewatch	(116763)	1.7 km	MPC · JPL
499819	2011 DR_{10}	—	January 28, 2011	Kitt Peak	Spacewatch	·	1.8 km	MPC · JPL
499820	2011 DF_{11}	—	February 25, 2011	La Sagra	OAM	·	2.1 km	MPC · JPL
499821	2011 DK_{11}	—	February 25, 2011	Catalina	CSS	H	540 m	MPC · JPL
499822	2011 DT_{13}	—	March 13, 2007	Mount Lemmon	Mount Lemmon Survey	·	780 m	MPC · JPL
499823	2011 DN_{14}	—	February 9, 2011	Mount Lemmon	Mount Lemmon Survey	·	1.1 km	MPC · JPL
499824	2011 DE_{19}	—	November 3, 2010	Kitt Peak	Spacewatch	·	2.1 km	MPC · JPL
499825	2011 DB_{22}	—	February 10, 2011	Catalina	CSS	·	1.3 km	MPC · JPL
499826	2011 DS_{22}	—	March 14, 2007	Mount Lemmon	Mount Lemmon Survey	·	1.5 km	MPC · JPL
499827	2011 DW_{23}	—	February 26, 2011	Kitt Peak	Spacewatch	·	1.9 km	MPC · JPL
499828	2011 DY_{24}	—	January 29, 2011	Mount Lemmon	Mount Lemmon Survey	MAR	880 m	MPC · JPL
499829	2011 DE_{28}	—	March 20, 2007	Kitt Peak	Spacewatch	·	1.2 km	MPC · JPL
499830	2011 DS_{30}	—	December 10, 2010	Mount Lemmon	Mount Lemmon Survey	·	1.2 km	MPC · JPL
499831	2011 DK_{31}	—	January 2, 2011	Mount Lemmon	Mount Lemmon Survey	·	1.3 km	MPC · JPL
499832	2011 DH_{36}	—	February 25, 2011	Mount Lemmon	Mount Lemmon Survey	·	1.3 km	MPC · JPL
499833	2011 DV_{40}	—	February 25, 2011	Mount Lemmon	Mount Lemmon Survey	·	1.5 km	MPC · JPL
499834	2011 DC_{41}	—	February 25, 2011	Mount Lemmon	Mount Lemmon Survey	GAL	1.9 km	MPC · JPL
499835	2011 DE_{46}	—	April 25, 2007	Kitt Peak	Spacewatch	·	1.6 km	MPC · JPL
499836	2011 DY_{47}	—	October 22, 2009	Mount Lemmon	Mount Lemmon Survey	·	2.8 km	MPC · JPL
499837	2011 EG	—	April 20, 2007	Mount Lemmon	Mount Lemmon Survey	·	1.5 km	MPC · JPL
499838	2011 EQ_{2}	—	February 21, 2007	Kitt Peak	Spacewatch	(5)	1.1 km	MPC · JPL
499839	2011 EC_{10}	—	February 10, 2011	Mount Lemmon	Mount Lemmon Survey	JUN	1.0 km	MPC · JPL
499840	2011 EZ_{11}	—	January 27, 2003	Socorro	LINEAR	H	560 m	MPC · JPL
499841	2011 EJ_{13}	—	August 30, 2005	Kitt Peak	Spacewatch	RAF	910 m	MPC · JPL
499842	2011 EN_{14}	—	February 20, 2010	WISE	WISE	·	5.1 km	MPC · JPL
499843	2011 ER_{23}	—	January 29, 2011	Kitt Peak	Spacewatch	·	1.5 km	MPC · JPL
499844	2011 ES_{23}	—	January 16, 2010	WISE	WISE	·	2.0 km	MPC · JPL
499845	2011 ET_{23}	—	March 15, 2007	Mount Lemmon	Mount Lemmon Survey	·	1.4 km	MPC · JPL
499846	2011 EX_{25}	—	February 25, 2011	Kitt Peak	Spacewatch	GEF	1.0 km	MPC · JPL
499847	2011 EE_{27}	—	March 6, 2011	Kitt Peak	Spacewatch	·	1.4 km	MPC · JPL
499848	2011 EH_{29}	—	February 12, 2011	Mount Lemmon	Mount Lemmon Survey	·	1.6 km	MPC · JPL
499849	2011 EA_{30}	—	January 11, 2011	Mount Lemmon	Mount Lemmon Survey	H	510 m	MPC · JPL
499850	2011 EZ_{31}	—	January 29, 2011	Kitt Peak	Spacewatch	·	810 m	MPC · JPL
499851	2011 EZ_{34}	—	March 14, 2007	Mount Lemmon	Mount Lemmon Survey	·	1.1 km	MPC · JPL
499852	2011 ER_{42}	—	April 26, 2007	Mount Lemmon	Mount Lemmon Survey	·	2.5 km	MPC · JPL
499853	2011 EF_{43}	—	December 26, 2005	Kitt Peak	Spacewatch	·	2.2 km	MPC · JPL
499854	2011 EW_{43}	—	February 23, 2011	Kitt Peak	Spacewatch	·	980 m	MPC · JPL
499855	2011 ET_{58}	—	March 12, 2011	Mount Lemmon	Mount Lemmon Survey	·	1.9 km	MPC · JPL
499856	2011 ET_{67}	—	February 8, 2011	Mount Lemmon	Mount Lemmon Survey	·	1.1 km	MPC · JPL
499857	2011 EB_{69}	—	March 10, 2011	Kitt Peak	Spacewatch	·	1.8 km	MPC · JPL
499858	2011 EH_{70}	—	March 10, 2011	Kitt Peak	Spacewatch	·	1.5 km	MPC · JPL
499859	2011 EH_{73}	—	March 2, 2011	Kitt Peak	Spacewatch	·	1.4 km	MPC · JPL
499860	2011 EE_{74}	—	March 7, 2011	Siding Spring	SSS	·	2.5 km	MPC · JPL
499861	2011 EL_{76}	—	February 25, 2011	Kitt Peak	Spacewatch	·	1.9 km	MPC · JPL
499862	2011 EU_{76}	—	March 7, 2011	XuYi	PMO NEO Survey Program	(194)	2.0 km	MPC · JPL
499863	2011 EZ_{84}	—	September 28, 2009	Mount Lemmon	Mount Lemmon Survey	·	1.1 km	MPC · JPL
499864	2011 EC_{85}	—	February 25, 2011	Kitt Peak	Spacewatch	·	1.6 km	MPC · JPL
499865	2011 FX_{4}	—	March 11, 2011	Catalina	CSS	·	1.2 km	MPC · JPL
499866	2011 FS_{11}	—	September 23, 2008	Mount Lemmon	Mount Lemmon Survey	·	2.9 km	MPC · JPL
499867	2011 FS_{12}	—	January 14, 2011	Mount Lemmon	Mount Lemmon Survey	·	2.6 km	MPC · JPL
499868	2011 FW_{17}	—	February 25, 2011	Kitt Peak	Spacewatch	EUN	1.2 km	MPC · JPL
499869	2011 FK_{18}	—	January 30, 2006	Kitt Peak	Spacewatch	·	1.5 km	MPC · JPL
499870	2011 FP_{20}	—	March 1, 2011	Mount Lemmon	Mount Lemmon Survey	·	1.4 km	MPC · JPL
499871	2011 FV_{20}	—	June 30, 2008	Kitt Peak	Spacewatch	·	1.2 km	MPC · JPL
499872	2011 FR_{23}	—	January 14, 2011	Mount Lemmon	Mount Lemmon Survey	·	2.3 km	MPC · JPL
499873	2011 FD_{24}	—	March 15, 2007	Mount Lemmon	Mount Lemmon Survey	·	1.0 km	MPC · JPL
499874	2011 FK_{24}	—	October 8, 2004	Socorro	LINEAR	·	1.8 km	MPC · JPL
499875	2011 FT_{27}	—	February 10, 2011	Mount Lemmon	Mount Lemmon Survey	·	1.7 km	MPC · JPL
499876	2011 FO_{30}	—	March 11, 2011	Kitt Peak	Spacewatch	·	2.1 km	MPC · JPL
499877	2011 FY_{30}	—	March 27, 2011	Mount Lemmon	Mount Lemmon Survey	·	2.2 km	MPC · JPL
499878	2011 FF_{40}	—	March 13, 2011	Kitt Peak	Spacewatch	·	2.0 km	MPC · JPL
499879	2011 FJ_{46}	—	January 4, 2006	Kitt Peak	Spacewatch	·	1.9 km	MPC · JPL
499880	2011 FQ_{51}	—	January 10, 2011	Mount Lemmon	Mount Lemmon Survey	·	1.2 km	MPC · JPL
499881	2011 FO_{55}	—	February 2, 2005	Kitt Peak	Spacewatch	·	4.0 km	MPC · JPL
499882	2011 FU_{67}	—	March 27, 2011	Mount Lemmon	Mount Lemmon Survey	·	1.0 km	MPC · JPL
499883	2011 FL_{73}	—	February 25, 2011	Mount Lemmon	Mount Lemmon Survey	(5)	1.0 km	MPC · JPL
499884	2011 FJ_{78}	—	October 6, 1999	Kitt Peak	Spacewatch	H	420 m	MPC · JPL
499885	2011 FJ_{87}	—	March 24, 2011	Catalina	CSS	·	1.8 km	MPC · JPL
499886	2011 FH_{89}	—	March 11, 2011	Catalina	CSS	·	2.5 km	MPC · JPL
499887	2011 FM_{90}	—	October 5, 2004	Kitt Peak	Spacewatch	·	1.6 km	MPC · JPL
499888	2011 FD_{102}	—	January 8, 2011	Mount Lemmon	Mount Lemmon Survey	·	1.3 km	MPC · JPL
499889	2011 FT_{102}	—	March 13, 2011	Mount Lemmon	Mount Lemmon Survey	(5)	1.2 km	MPC · JPL
499890	2011 FF_{121}	—	March 14, 2011	Mount Lemmon	Mount Lemmon Survey	KOR	970 m	MPC · JPL
499891	2011 FY_{126}	—	January 22, 2010	WISE	WISE	·	1.7 km	MPC · JPL
499892	2011 FE_{130}	—	January 21, 2010	WISE	WISE	·	2.6 km	MPC · JPL
499893	2011 FH_{130}	—	December 30, 2005	Kitt Peak	Spacewatch	·	1.6 km	MPC · JPL
499894	2011 FC_{134}	—	February 25, 2011	Mount Lemmon	Mount Lemmon Survey	NEM	2.0 km	MPC · JPL
499895	2011 FV_{137}	—	October 1, 2008	Mount Lemmon	Mount Lemmon Survey	·	1.6 km	MPC · JPL
499896	2011 FN_{147}	—	April 1, 2011	Catalina	CSS	H	540 m	MPC · JPL
499897	2011 FW_{149}	—	September 10, 2007	Kitt Peak	Spacewatch	·	1.6 km	MPC · JPL
499898	2011 FN_{155}	—	April 18, 2007	Kitt Peak	Spacewatch	NEM	2.5 km	MPC · JPL
499899	2011 FY_{157}	—	May 11, 2007	Mount Lemmon	Mount Lemmon Survey	·	2.0 km	MPC · JPL
499900	2011 GD_{5}	—	April 2, 2011	Mount Lemmon	Mount Lemmon Survey	·	1.0 km	MPC · JPL

== 499901–500000 ==
back to top

Designation			Discovery			Properties		Ref
Permanent	Provisional	Named after	Date	Site	Discoverer(s)	Category	Diam.	Ref
499901	2011 GF_{6}	—	January 16, 2011	Mount Lemmon	Mount Lemmon Survey	·	1.6 km	MPC · JPL
499902	2011 GZ_{20}	—	March 11, 2011	Mount Lemmon	Mount Lemmon Survey	·	2.2 km	MPC · JPL
499903	2011 GV_{23}	—	January 14, 2011	Kitt Peak	Spacewatch	HNS	1.5 km	MPC · JPL
499904	2011 GG_{27}	—	September 4, 2008	Kitt Peak	Spacewatch	·	1.7 km	MPC · JPL
499905	2011 GG_{32}	—	March 28, 2011	Kitt Peak	Spacewatch	AGN	1.1 km	MPC · JPL
499906	2011 GE_{35}	—	September 6, 2008	Kitt Peak	Spacewatch	·	1.5 km	MPC · JPL
499907	2011 GX_{39}	—	March 27, 2011	Mount Lemmon	Mount Lemmon Survey	MRX	880 m	MPC · JPL
499908	2011 GB_{51}	—	March 14, 2007	Kitt Peak	Spacewatch	·	790 m	MPC · JPL
499909	2011 GQ_{60}	—	May 25, 2006	Mount Lemmon	Mount Lemmon Survey	·	2.0 km	MPC · JPL
499910	2011 GS_{61}	—	March 1, 2011	Mount Lemmon	Mount Lemmon Survey	H	480 m	MPC · JPL
499911	2011 GC_{63}	—	March 9, 2011	Kitt Peak	Spacewatch	·	1.8 km	MPC · JPL
499912	2011 GP_{69}	—	January 22, 2006	Mount Lemmon	Mount Lemmon Survey	·	1.5 km	MPC · JPL
499913	2011 GX_{71}	—	February 27, 2006	Catalina	CSS	·	3.3 km	MPC · JPL
499914	2011 GC_{75}	—	March 2, 2011	Kitt Peak	Spacewatch	·	1.7 km	MPC · JPL
499915	2011 GN_{76}	—	March 26, 2011	Mount Lemmon	Mount Lemmon Survey	·	2.1 km	MPC · JPL
499916	2011 GP_{76}	—	January 28, 2006	Kitt Peak	Spacewatch	DOR	2.0 km	MPC · JPL
499917	2011 GS_{77}	—	April 2, 2011	Haleakala	Pan-STARRS 1	H	500 m	MPC · JPL
499918	2011 GV_{78}	—	April 13, 2011	Mount Lemmon	Mount Lemmon Survey	·	1.7 km	MPC · JPL
499919	2011 GO_{79}	—	January 6, 2010	Kitt Peak	Spacewatch	EOS	1.9 km	MPC · JPL
499920	2011 HX_{2}	—	April 13, 2011	Mount Lemmon	Mount Lemmon Survey	EOS	1.5 km	MPC · JPL
499921	2011 HC_{8}	—	May 28, 2000	Socorro	LINEAR	H	650 m	MPC · JPL
499922	2011 HJ_{8}	—	April 6, 2011	Mount Lemmon	Mount Lemmon Survey	H	590 m	MPC · JPL
499923	2011 HK_{11}	—	September 16, 2009	Kitt Peak	Spacewatch	H	550 m	MPC · JPL
499924	2011 HO_{19}	—	April 26, 2011	Kitt Peak	Spacewatch	EUN	1.4 km	MPC · JPL
499925	2011 HN_{20}	—	March 30, 2011	Mount Lemmon	Mount Lemmon Survey	·	1.7 km	MPC · JPL
499926	2011 HQ_{22}	—	April 4, 2011	Kitt Peak	Spacewatch	·	1.6 km	MPC · JPL
499927	2011 HR_{22}	—	April 8, 2006	Kitt Peak	Spacewatch	·	1.8 km	MPC · JPL
499928	2011 HA_{26}	—	April 12, 2002	Palomar	NEAT	·	2.0 km	MPC · JPL
499929	2011 HQ_{26}	—	February 4, 2005	Kitt Peak	Spacewatch	·	2.0 km	MPC · JPL
499930	2011 HT_{32}	—	September 22, 2006	Catalina	CSS	·	2.1 km	MPC · JPL
499931	2011 HK_{39}	—	April 28, 2011	Haleakala	Pan-STARRS 1	H	750 m	MPC · JPL
499932	2011 HS_{41}	—	April 6, 2011	Mount Lemmon	Mount Lemmon Survey	·	2.5 km	MPC · JPL
499933	2011 HU_{41}	—	September 5, 2008	Kitt Peak	Spacewatch	·	1.7 km	MPC · JPL
499934	2011 HW_{41}	—	April 5, 2011	Mount Lemmon	Mount Lemmon Survey	H	490 m	MPC · JPL
499935	2011 HA_{42}	—	April 27, 2011	Kitt Peak	Spacewatch	·	2.0 km	MPC · JPL
499936	2011 HX_{43}	—	March 31, 2011	Mount Lemmon	Mount Lemmon Survey	·	930 m	MPC · JPL
499937	2011 HB_{44}	—	March 1, 2011	Mount Lemmon	Mount Lemmon Survey	·	1.7 km	MPC · JPL
499938	2011 HU_{44}	—	April 27, 2011	Haleakala	Pan-STARRS 1	·	2.5 km	MPC · JPL
499939	2011 HC_{51}	—	April 30, 2011	Kitt Peak	Spacewatch	·	1.8 km	MPC · JPL
499940	2011 HF_{52}	—	February 23, 2006	Anderson Mesa	LONEOS	·	2.5 km	MPC · JPL
499941	2011 HH_{53}	—	April 28, 2011	Kitt Peak	Spacewatch	·	1.9 km	MPC · JPL
499942	2011 HC_{59}	—	April 24, 2011	Kitt Peak	Spacewatch	·	2.2 km	MPC · JPL
499943	2011 HO_{61}	—	May 26, 2006	Kitt Peak	Spacewatch	H	410 m	MPC · JPL
499944	2011 HP_{66}	—	April 22, 2011	Kitt Peak	Spacewatch	·	1.9 km	MPC · JPL
499945	2011 HU_{69}	—	March 27, 2011	Mount Lemmon	Mount Lemmon Survey	·	2.0 km	MPC · JPL
499946	2011 HN_{75}	—	April 28, 2011	Kitt Peak	Spacewatch	·	2.1 km	MPC · JPL
499947	2011 HW_{76}	—	March 2, 2006	Mount Lemmon	Mount Lemmon Survey	GEF	1.6 km	MPC · JPL
499948	2011 HR_{93}	—	November 7, 2008	Mount Lemmon	Mount Lemmon Survey	·	1.7 km	MPC · JPL
499949	2011 HE_{95}	—	April 6, 2011	Mount Lemmon	Mount Lemmon Survey	·	1.4 km	MPC · JPL
499950	2011 HG_{95}	—	June 12, 2007	Kitt Peak	Spacewatch	·	1.8 km	MPC · JPL
499951	2011 HA_{98}	—	October 11, 2007	Catalina	CSS	·	2.6 km	MPC · JPL
499952	2011 HP_{100}	—	April 27, 2011	Kitt Peak	Spacewatch	·	1.6 km	MPC · JPL
499953	2011 HU_{100}	—	April 28, 2011	Haleakala	Pan-STARRS 1	·	2.6 km	MPC · JPL
499954	2011 JT_{3}	—	May 1, 2011	Haleakala	Pan-STARRS 1	·	2.4 km	MPC · JPL
499955	2011 JM_{6}	—	April 1, 2011	Kitt Peak	Spacewatch	·	1.4 km	MPC · JPL
499956	2011 JR_{6}	—	March 27, 2011	Mount Lemmon	Mount Lemmon Survey	·	2.3 km	MPC · JPL
499957	2011 JE_{10}	—	April 4, 2011	Catalina	CSS	H	520 m	MPC · JPL
499958	2011 JN_{13}	—	March 10, 2005	Mount Lemmon	Mount Lemmon Survey	AEG	1.8 km	MPC · JPL
499959	2011 JN_{16}	—	May 1, 2011	Haleakala	Pan-STARRS 1	·	3.1 km	MPC · JPL
499960	2011 JQ_{17}	—	April 28, 2011	Kitt Peak	Spacewatch	LIX	3.1 km	MPC · JPL
499961	2011 JN_{21}	—	April 2, 2011	Mount Lemmon	Mount Lemmon Survey	·	1.2 km	MPC · JPL
499962	2011 JY_{27}	—	April 13, 2011	Haleakala	Pan-STARRS 1	·	2.1 km	MPC · JPL
499963	2011 JT_{30}	—	January 30, 2011	Haleakala	Pan-STARRS 1	·	2.0 km	MPC · JPL
499964	2011 KQ_{5}	—	May 3, 2011	Mount Lemmon	Mount Lemmon Survey	·	1.7 km	MPC · JPL
499965	2011 KS_{14}	—	January 30, 2011	Haleakala	Pan-STARRS 1	·	1.8 km	MPC · JPL
499966	2011 KP_{18}	—	May 24, 2011	Haleakala	Pan-STARRS 1	EMA	3.4 km	MPC · JPL
499967	2011 KG_{22}	—	March 8, 2005	Mount Lemmon	Mount Lemmon Survey	·	1.9 km	MPC · JPL
499968	2011 KM_{22}	—	May 27, 2011	Kitt Peak	Spacewatch	·	2.3 km	MPC · JPL
499969	2011 KN_{23}	—	May 9, 2011	Mount Lemmon	Mount Lemmon Survey	·	2.5 km	MPC · JPL
499970	2011 KL_{24}	—	May 30, 2011	Haleakala	Pan-STARRS 1	·	1.2 km	MPC · JPL
499971	2011 KM_{25}	—	March 31, 2010	WISE	WISE	·	2.4 km	MPC · JPL
499972	2011 KO_{25}	—	September 13, 2007	Mount Lemmon	Mount Lemmon Survey	·	2.4 km	MPC · JPL
499973	2011 KS_{25}	—	April 27, 2011	Mount Lemmon	Mount Lemmon Survey	GEF	1.2 km	MPC · JPL
499974	2011 KN_{26}	—	April 30, 2011	Mount Lemmon	Mount Lemmon Survey	·	1.9 km	MPC · JPL
499975	2011 KT_{30}	—	January 30, 2011	Haleakala	Pan-STARRS 1	·	2.9 km	MPC · JPL
499976	2011 KH_{38}	—	March 4, 2005	Mount Lemmon	Mount Lemmon Survey	·	1.9 km	MPC · JPL
499977	2011 KK_{44}	—	May 27, 2011	Kitt Peak	Spacewatch	·	1.7 km	MPC · JPL
499978	2011 KC_{48}	—	May 7, 2010	WISE	WISE	·	1.8 km	MPC · JPL
499979	2011 LF_{10}	—	May 7, 2000	Kitt Peak	Spacewatch	·	2.9 km	MPC · JPL
499980	2011 LX_{18}	—	August 25, 2001	Socorro	LINEAR	·	2.2 km	MPC · JPL
499981	2011 LU_{19}	—	June 11, 2011	Mount Lemmon	Mount Lemmon Survey	·	2.7 km	MPC · JPL
499982	2011 LU_{27}	—	February 2, 2005	Kitt Peak	Spacewatch	·	1.7 km	MPC · JPL
499983	2011 MK_{3}	—	July 2, 2010	WISE	WISE	THB	2.6 km	MPC · JPL
499984	2011 MG_{6}	—	November 8, 2007	Catalina	CSS	·	2.8 km	MPC · JPL
499985	2011 MO_{6}	—	May 17, 2001	Kitt Peak	Spacewatch	·	2.8 km	MPC · JPL
499986	2011 NP	—	July 3, 2011	Catalina	CSS	AMO	370 m	MPC · JPL
499987	2011 OW_{2}	—	July 23, 2011	Haleakala	Pan-STARRS 1	·	2.2 km	MPC · JPL
499988	2011 OM_{6}	—	July 26, 2011	Haleakala	Pan-STARRS 1	·	3.3 km	MPC · JPL
499989	2011 OM_{10}	—	July 22, 2011	Haleakala	Pan-STARRS 1	·	2.8 km	MPC · JPL
499990	2011 OH_{11}	—	June 27, 2011	Kitt Peak	Spacewatch	·	2.8 km	MPC · JPL
499991	2011 OA_{15}	—	July 26, 2010	WISE	WISE	T_{j} (2.96)	3.8 km	MPC · JPL
499992	2011 OP_{15}	—	August 31, 2000	Socorro	LINEAR	·	3.5 km	MPC · JPL
499993	2011 OJ_{34}	—	June 23, 2010	WISE	WISE	LIX	3.6 km	MPC · JPL
499994	2011 OR_{41}	—	July 2, 2010	WISE	WISE	·	2.9 km	MPC · JPL
499995	2011 OP_{45}	—	July 6, 2010	WISE	WISE	LIX	3.4 km	MPC · JPL
499996	2011 OL_{55}	—	January 30, 2008	Catalina	CSS	·	4.2 km	MPC · JPL
499997	2011 OO_{56}	—	July 27, 2011	Haleakala	Pan-STARRS 1	·	3.7 km	MPC · JPL
499998	2011 PT	—	August 1, 2011	Haleakala	Pan-STARRS 1	AMO	60 m	MPC · JPL
499999	2011 PZ_{3}	—	April 15, 2010	Mount Lemmon	Mount Lemmon Survey	LIX	3.3 km	MPC · JPL
500000 Kaichi	2011 PM_{6}	Kaichi	August 4, 2011	Haleakala	Pan-STARRS 1	·	3.7 km	MPC · JPL

back to top

== Meaning of names ==
As minor planet discoveries are confirmed, they are given a permanent number by the IAU's Minor Planet Center (MPC), and the discoverers can then submit names for them, following the IAU's naming conventions. The list below concerns those minor planets in the specified number-range that have received names, and explains the meanings of those names.

Official naming citations of newly named small Solar System bodies are approved and published in a bulletin by IAU's Working Group for Small Bodies Nomenclature (WGSBN). Before May 2021, citations were published in MPC's Minor Planet Circulars for many decades. Recent citations can also be found on the JPL Small-Body Database (SBDB). Until his death in 2016, German astronomer Lutz D. Schmadel compiled these citations into the Dictionary of Minor Planet Names (DMP) and regularly updated the collection.

Based on Paul Herget's The Names of the Minor Planets, Schmadel also researched the unclear origin of numerous asteroids, most of which had been named prior to World War II. This article incorporates text from this source, which is in the public domain: SBDB New namings may only be added to this list below after official publication as the preannouncement of names is condemned. The WGSBN publishes a comprehensive guideline for the naming rules of non-cometary small Solar System bodies.

Named minor planet	Provisional	This minor planet was named for...	Ref · Catalog
499367 Monikasirp	2010 AB	Monika Sirp (b. 1958) was drawn to physics and mathematics from Asimov's sciencefiction novels. In her professional life, she has worked in the energy field, focusing on fossil-free possibilities. Monika supports her husband, Dietrich Kracht, a German amateur astronomer.	IAU · 499367
499526 Romhányi	2010 RO_{11}	Romhányi, a Hungarian writer	IAU · 499526
500000 Kaichi	2011 PM_{6}	Carolyn Kaichi, American astronomy educator.	IAU · 500000
