= List of minor planets: 728001–729000 =

The following is a partial list of minor planets, running from minor-planet number 728001 through 729000, inclusive. The primary data for this and other partial lists is based on JPL's "Small-Body Orbital Elements" and data available from the Minor Planet Center. Critical list information is also provided by the MPC, unless otherwise specified from Lowell Observatory. A detailed description of the table's columns and additional sources are given on the main page including a complete list of every page in this series, and a statistical break-up on the dynamical classification of minor planets.

Also see the summary list of all named bodies in numerical and alphabetical order, and the corresponding naming citations for the number range of this particular list. New namings may only be added to this list after official publication, as the preannouncement of names is condemned by the Working Group for Small Bodies Nomenclature of the International Astronomical Union.

Near-Earth obj.	MBA (inner)	MBA (outer)	Centaur
Mars-crosser	MBA (middle)	Jupiter trojan	Trans-Neptunian obj.
Unclassified

== 728001–728100 ==
Designation			Discovery			Properties		Ref
Permanent	Provisional	Named after	Date	Site	Discoverer(s)	Category	Diam.	Ref
728001	2010 KT_{110}	—	May 29, 2010	WISE	WISE	·	3.5 km	MPC · JPL
728002	2010 KB_{111}	—	October 16, 2003	Kitt Peak	Spacewatch	·	2.5 km	MPC · JPL
728003	2010 KG_{111}	—	May 30, 2010	WISE	WISE	·	3.1 km	MPC · JPL
728004	2010 KP_{112}	—	May 30, 2010	WISE	WISE	·	1.5 km	MPC · JPL
728005	2010 KS_{112}	—	October 27, 2005	Catalina	CSS	·	3.5 km	MPC · JPL
728006	2010 KG_{113}	—	May 30, 2010	WISE	WISE	·	2.2 km	MPC · JPL
728007	2010 KX_{113}	—	May 30, 2010	WISE	WISE	·	3.2 km	MPC · JPL
728008	2010 KE_{114}	—	May 30, 2010	WISE	WISE	·	2.9 km	MPC · JPL
728009	2010 KH_{114}	—	May 30, 2010	WISE	WISE	·	2.6 km	MPC · JPL
728010	2010 KX_{115}	—	March 26, 2006	Kitt Peak	Spacewatch	MIS	2.3 km	MPC · JPL
728011	2010 KX_{116}	—	October 20, 2006	Palomar	NEAT	·	2.2 km	MPC · JPL
728012	2010 KA_{118}	—	May 18, 2010	La Sagra	OAM	H	510 m	MPC · JPL
728013	2010 KW_{118}	—	May 30, 2010	WISE	WISE	·	3.4 km	MPC · JPL
728014	2010 KM_{119}	—	May 30, 2010	WISE	WISE	·	1.7 km	MPC · JPL
728015	2010 KG_{120}	—	May 31, 2010	WISE	WISE	·	3.2 km	MPC · JPL
728016	2010 KJ_{121}	—	April 17, 2009	Mount Lemmon	Mount Lemmon Survey	·	3.3 km	MPC · JPL
728017	2010 KT_{121}	—	May 31, 2010	WISE	WISE	·	5.2 km	MPC · JPL
728018	2010 KA_{122}	—	June 5, 2010	WISE	WISE	·	1.4 km	MPC · JPL
728019	2010 KR_{123}	—	May 31, 2010	WISE	WISE	EUP	3.8 km	MPC · JPL
728020	2010 KX_{123}	—	May 31, 2010	WISE	WISE	·	3.8 km	MPC · JPL
728021	2010 KK_{124}	—	May 31, 2010	WISE	WISE	·	3.4 km	MPC · JPL
728022	2010 KS_{124}	—	May 31, 2010	WISE	WISE	·	3.3 km	MPC · JPL
728023	2010 KV_{124}	—	May 31, 2010	WISE	WISE	EUP	3.4 km	MPC · JPL
728024	2010 KW_{125}	—	September 29, 2008	Mount Lemmon	Mount Lemmon Survey	·	4.0 km	MPC · JPL
728025	2010 KU_{126}	—	May 16, 2005	Palomar	NEAT	·	3.9 km	MPC · JPL
728026	2010 KY_{126}	—	May 31, 2010	WISE	WISE	·	1.6 km	MPC · JPL
728027	2010 KC_{132}	—	May 16, 2010	WISE	WISE	ULA	3.5 km	MPC · JPL
728028	2010 KK_{136}	—	January 20, 2015	Haleakala	Pan-STARRS 1	·	2.3 km	MPC · JPL
728029	2010 KN_{141}	—	July 12, 2016	Mount Lemmon	Mount Lemmon Survey	·	3.3 km	MPC · JPL
728030	2010 KC_{146}	—	November 1, 2006	Mount Lemmon	Mount Lemmon Survey	·	1.4 km	MPC · JPL
728031	2010 KC_{155}	—	July 27, 2005	Palomar	NEAT	·	2.3 km	MPC · JPL
728032	2010 KT_{156}	—	February 16, 2015	Haleakala	Pan-STARRS 1	·	2.3 km	MPC · JPL
728033	2010 LA_{1}	—	July 2, 2006	Bergisch Gladbach	W. Bickel	·	1.0 km	MPC · JPL
728034	2010 LC_{3}	—	March 20, 2010	Mount Lemmon	Mount Lemmon Survey	ADE	2.3 km	MPC · JPL
728035	2010 LA_{4}	—	April 25, 2006	Kitt Peak	Spacewatch	·	2.2 km	MPC · JPL
728036	2010 LA_{5}	—	June 1, 2010	WISE	WISE	T_{j} (2.99) · EUP	5.2 km	MPC · JPL
728037	2010 LB_{6}	—	June 1, 2010	WISE	WISE	·	2.8 km	MPC · JPL
728038	2010 LK_{7}	—	June 1, 2010	WISE	WISE	·	2.8 km	MPC · JPL
728039	2010 LX_{7}	—	June 1, 2010	WISE	WISE	·	1.6 km	MPC · JPL
728040	2010 LY_{7}	—	June 1, 2010	WISE	WISE	ADE	2.0 km	MPC · JPL
728041	2010 LX_{8}	—	April 8, 2003	Palomar	NEAT	ERI	1.9 km	MPC · JPL
728042	2010 LE_{9}	—	June 6, 2010	WISE	WISE	·	2.2 km	MPC · JPL
728043	2010 LG_{9}	—	November 20, 2006	Kitt Peak	Spacewatch	HOF	3.1 km	MPC · JPL
728044	2010 LO_{9}	—	June 2, 2010	WISE	WISE	·	3.2 km	MPC · JPL
728045	2010 LM_{11}	—	June 2, 2010	WISE	WISE	·	2.3 km	MPC · JPL
728046	2010 LP_{11}	—	June 2, 2010	WISE	WISE	·	1.4 km	MPC · JPL
728047	2010 LQ_{11}	—	June 2, 2010	WISE	WISE	·	2.1 km	MPC · JPL
728048	2010 LV_{11}	—	June 2, 2010	WISE	WISE	·	3.6 km	MPC · JPL
728049	2010 LF_{12}	—	June 5, 2010	WISE	WISE	·	3.2 km	MPC · JPL
728050	2010 LO_{12}	—	October 1, 2005	Mount Lemmon	Mount Lemmon Survey	·	4.4 km	MPC · JPL
728051	2010 LA_{13}	—	June 2, 2010	WISE	WISE	·	3.3 km	MPC · JPL
728052	2010 LC_{13}	—	April 22, 2009	Mount Lemmon	Mount Lemmon Survey	·	2.5 km	MPC · JPL
728053	2010 LO_{13}	—	June 2, 2010	WISE	WISE	·	3.2 km	MPC · JPL
728054	2010 LK_{14}	—	May 23, 2010	Bergisch Gladbach	W. Bickel	·	2.9 km	MPC · JPL
728055	2010 LN_{15}	—	June 6, 2010	WISE	WISE	T_{j} (2.97) · EUP	4.7 km	MPC · JPL
728056	2010 LT_{15}	—	June 3, 2010	Nogales	M. Schwartz, P. R. Holvorcem	·	1.6 km	MPC · JPL
728057	2010 LV_{15}	—	July 22, 2003	Haleakala	NEAT	PHO	1.7 km	MPC · JPL
728058	2010 LK_{16}	—	December 4, 2008	Mount Lemmon	Mount Lemmon Survey	·	2.8 km	MPC · JPL
728059	2010 LU_{16}	—	April 24, 2009	Mount Lemmon	Mount Lemmon Survey	·	5.0 km	MPC · JPL
728060	2010 LT_{17}	—	October 12, 2006	Kitt Peak	Spacewatch	MIS	2.4 km	MPC · JPL
728061	2010 LW_{17}	—	June 3, 2010	WISE	WISE	·	3.0 km	MPC · JPL
728062	2010 LT_{18}	—	February 19, 2010	Kitt Peak	Spacewatch	3:2	4.6 km	MPC · JPL
728063	2010 LX_{19}	—	June 3, 2010	WISE	WISE	·	4.1 km	MPC · JPL
728064	2010 LG_{20}	—	June 3, 2010	WISE	WISE	·	1.5 km	MPC · JPL
728065	2010 LS_{21}	—	October 9, 2008	Mount Lemmon	Mount Lemmon Survey	BRG	1.3 km	MPC · JPL
728066	2010 LD_{22}	—	June 4, 2010	WISE	WISE	·	1.2 km	MPC · JPL
728067	2010 LF_{22}	—	June 4, 2010	WISE	WISE	·	3.2 km	MPC · JPL
728068	2010 LY_{22}	—	September 12, 2007	Catalina	CSS	·	2.0 km	MPC · JPL
728069	2010 LH_{23}	—	June 4, 2010	WISE	WISE	BRU	3.9 km	MPC · JPL
728070	2010 LM_{23}	—	June 4, 2010	WISE	WISE	PHO	2.1 km	MPC · JPL
728071	2010 LV_{23}	—	April 12, 2002	Socorro	LINEAR	KON	2.3 km	MPC · JPL
728072	2010 LC_{24}	—	June 4, 2005	Kitt Peak	Spacewatch	LUT	3.3 km	MPC · JPL
728073	2010 LJ_{24}	—	July 20, 2006	Lulin	LUSS	·	3.5 km	MPC · JPL
728074	2010 LW_{25}	—	June 5, 2010	WISE	WISE	·	2.8 km	MPC · JPL
728075	2010 LA_{27}	—	June 5, 2010	WISE	WISE	·	3.3 km	MPC · JPL
728076	2010 LV_{27}	—	June 5, 2010	WISE	WISE	·	1.8 km	MPC · JPL
728077	2010 LY_{27}	—	March 16, 2010	Mount Lemmon	Mount Lemmon Survey	·	1.6 km	MPC · JPL
728078	2010 LY_{30}	—	March 21, 2010	Mount Lemmon	Mount Lemmon Survey	·	4.4 km	MPC · JPL
728079	2010 LO_{31}	—	June 6, 2010	WISE	WISE	·	2.1 km	MPC · JPL
728080	2010 LR_{31}	—	June 6, 2010	WISE	WISE	·	2.8 km	MPC · JPL
728081	2010 LX_{31}	—	March 21, 2010	Catalina	CSS	T_{j} (2.99)	3.1 km	MPC · JPL
728082	2010 LG_{32}	—	June 6, 2010	WISE	WISE	·	2.3 km	MPC · JPL
728083	2010 LW_{32}	—	June 6, 2010	WISE	WISE	·	2.5 km	MPC · JPL
728084	2010 LA_{33}	—	March 20, 2010	Mount Lemmon	Mount Lemmon Survey	·	2.7 km	MPC · JPL
728085	2010 LU_{36}	—	November 13, 2002	Palomar	NEAT	·	3.1 km	MPC · JPL
728086	2010 LX_{38}	—	January 28, 2004	Socorro	LINEAR	EUP	4.1 km	MPC · JPL
728087	2010 LG_{39}	—	April 21, 2009	Mount Lemmon	Mount Lemmon Survey	·	2.2 km	MPC · JPL
728088	2010 LZ_{39}	—	June 7, 2010	WISE	WISE	·	2.9 km	MPC · JPL
728089	2010 LM_{40}	—	October 20, 2008	Mount Lemmon	Mount Lemmon Survey	·	1.9 km	MPC · JPL
728090	2010 LY_{41}	—	June 7, 2010	WISE	WISE	EOS	2.6 km	MPC · JPL
728091	2010 LR_{42}	—	September 16, 2006	Catalina	CSS	·	1.1 km	MPC · JPL
728092	2010 LW_{42}	—	June 7, 2010	WISE	WISE	DOR	2.0 km	MPC · JPL
728093	2010 LF_{43}	—	September 10, 2016	Kitt Peak	Spacewatch	·	2.6 km	MPC · JPL
728094	2010 LY_{43}	—	June 7, 2010	WISE	WISE	·	2.1 km	MPC · JPL
728095	2010 LN_{46}	—	April 10, 2005	Mount Lemmon	Mount Lemmon Survey	·	2.4 km	MPC · JPL
728096	2010 LF_{47}	—	September 30, 2005	Mount Lemmon	Mount Lemmon Survey	·	3.7 km	MPC · JPL
728097	2010 LB_{48}	—	February 7, 2002	Palomar	NEAT	·	2.7 km	MPC · JPL
728098	2010 LC_{48}	—	June 8, 2010	WISE	WISE	·	2.3 km	MPC · JPL
728099	2010 LJ_{48}	—	May 4, 2006	Mount Lemmon	Mount Lemmon Survey	·	1.8 km	MPC · JPL
728100	2010 LF_{49}	—	June 8, 2010	WISE	WISE	·	4.2 km	MPC · JPL

== 728101–728200 ==
back to top

Designation			Discovery			Properties		Ref
Permanent	Provisional	Named after	Date	Site	Discoverer(s)	Category	Diam.	Ref
728101	2010 LD_{50}	—	June 8, 2010	WISE	WISE	·	2.1 km	MPC · JPL
728102	2010 LZ_{50}	—	September 5, 2007	Mount Lemmon	Mount Lemmon Survey	·	4.9 km	MPC · JPL
728103	2010 LC_{51}	—	November 30, 2008	Mount Lemmon	Mount Lemmon Survey	·	3.6 km	MPC · JPL
728104	2010 LN_{51}	—	June 8, 2010	WISE	WISE	·	3.2 km	MPC · JPL
728105	2010 LW_{51}	—	June 8, 2010	WISE	WISE	·	1.9 km	MPC · JPL
728106	2010 LG_{52}	—	June 8, 2010	WISE	WISE	TEL	1.0 km	MPC · JPL
728107	2010 LH_{52}	—	February 15, 2010	Mount Lemmon	Mount Lemmon Survey	·	1.0 km	MPC · JPL
728108	2010 LY_{52}	—	June 8, 2010	WISE	WISE	·	3.0 km	MPC · JPL
728109	2010 LU_{53}	—	June 8, 2010	WISE	WISE	·	2.6 km	MPC · JPL
728110	2010 LX_{53}	—	October 23, 2005	Kitt Peak	Spacewatch	URS	3.4 km	MPC · JPL
728111	2010 LP_{54}	—	June 9, 2010	WISE	WISE	·	2.6 km	MPC · JPL
728112	2010 LA_{56}	—	June 9, 2010	WISE	WISE	·	2.7 km	MPC · JPL
728113	2010 LM_{57}	—	May 3, 2014	Mount Lemmon	Mount Lemmon Survey	·	2.7 km	MPC · JPL
728114	2010 LQ_{57}	—	June 9, 2010	WISE	WISE	·	2.9 km	MPC · JPL
728115	2010 LT_{57}	—	October 26, 2005	Kitt Peak	Spacewatch	·	5.5 km	MPC · JPL
728116	2010 LX_{57}	—	June 9, 2010	WISE	WISE	·	2.8 km	MPC · JPL
728117	2010 LR_{59}	—	June 9, 2010	WISE	WISE	·	2.3 km	MPC · JPL
728118	2010 LX_{59}	—	March 15, 2010	Mount Lemmon	Mount Lemmon Survey	·	1.9 km	MPC · JPL
728119	2010 LA_{60}	—	March 21, 2010	Mount Lemmon	Mount Lemmon Survey	·	3.2 km	MPC · JPL
728120	2010 LF_{60}	—	June 9, 2010	WISE	WISE	·	2.7 km	MPC · JPL
728121	2010 LE_{65}	—	December 1, 2005	Palomar	NEAT	H	670 m	MPC · JPL
728122	2010 LO_{66}	—	May 24, 2006	Mount Lemmon	Mount Lemmon Survey	·	3.5 km	MPC · JPL
728123	2010 LT_{66}	—	June 12, 2010	WISE	WISE	T_{j} (2.99) · 3:2	5.6 km	MPC · JPL
728124	2010 LE_{69}	—	January 10, 2007	Mount Lemmon	Mount Lemmon Survey	·	3.9 km	MPC · JPL
728125	2010 LC_{70}	—	June 9, 2010	WISE	WISE	·	3.0 km	MPC · JPL
728126	2010 LM_{70}	—	June 9, 2010	WISE	WISE	·	3.1 km	MPC · JPL
728127	2010 LC_{71}	—	June 10, 2010	WISE	WISE	·	3.6 km	MPC · JPL
728128	2010 LO_{72}	—	June 10, 2010	WISE	WISE	·	2.6 km	MPC · JPL
728129	2010 LO_{73}	—	October 7, 2005	Kitt Peak	Spacewatch	·	1.9 km	MPC · JPL
728130	2010 LA_{74}	—	March 3, 2006	Kitt Peak	Spacewatch	·	2.0 km	MPC · JPL
728131	2010 LS_{74}	—	June 10, 2010	WISE	WISE	·	3.0 km	MPC · JPL
728132	2010 LT_{74}	—	June 10, 2010	WISE	WISE	·	1.6 km	MPC · JPL
728133	2010 LU_{74}	—	November 15, 2006	Mount Lemmon	Mount Lemmon Survey	·	2.9 km	MPC · JPL
728134	2010 LE_{75}	—	June 10, 2010	WISE	WISE	·	1.7 km	MPC · JPL
728135	2010 LG_{75}	—	June 10, 2010	WISE	WISE	·	2.6 km	MPC · JPL
728136	2010 LC_{76}	—	February 18, 2008	Mount Lemmon	Mount Lemmon Survey	·	2.8 km	MPC · JPL
728137	2010 LK_{76}	—	June 10, 2010	WISE	WISE	·	3.9 km	MPC · JPL
728138	2010 LM_{76}	—	June 10, 2010	WISE	WISE	·	3.0 km	MPC · JPL
728139	2010 LE_{77}	—	June 10, 2010	WISE	WISE	EUP	2.8 km	MPC · JPL
728140	2010 LL_{77}	—	June 10, 2010	WISE	WISE	·	690 m	MPC · JPL
728141	2010 LO_{77}	—	June 10, 2010	WISE	WISE	·	2.8 km	MPC · JPL
728142	2010 LP_{77}	—	June 10, 2010	WISE	WISE	·	2.4 km	MPC · JPL
728143	2010 LA_{79}	—	June 10, 2010	WISE	WISE	·	2.0 km	MPC · JPL
728144	2010 LB_{79}	—	June 10, 2010	WISE	WISE	·	3.0 km	MPC · JPL
728145	2010 LP_{79}	—	June 10, 2010	WISE	WISE	·	3.0 km	MPC · JPL
728146	2010 LZ_{79}	—	June 10, 2010	WISE	WISE	·	3.6 km	MPC · JPL
728147	2010 LO_{81}	—	June 11, 2010	WISE	WISE	KON	1.7 km	MPC · JPL
728148	2010 LR_{81}	—	December 30, 2008	Kitt Peak	Spacewatch	·	3.9 km	MPC · JPL
728149	2010 LY_{81}	—	June 11, 2010	WISE	WISE	URS	3.9 km	MPC · JPL
728150	2010 LZ_{81}	—	June 11, 2010	WISE	WISE	·	3.9 km	MPC · JPL
728151	2010 LF_{82}	—	June 11, 2010	WISE	WISE	(58892)	2.6 km	MPC · JPL
728152	2010 LL_{83}	—	June 11, 2010	WISE	WISE	·	3.4 km	MPC · JPL
728153	2010 LC_{84}	—	June 11, 2010	WISE	WISE	·	2.8 km	MPC · JPL
728154	2010 LN_{84}	—	November 29, 2005	Palomar	NEAT	·	3.9 km	MPC · JPL
728155	2010 LA_{85}	—	September 20, 2008	Mount Lemmon	Mount Lemmon Survey	·	1.4 km	MPC · JPL
728156	2010 LS_{85}	—	March 17, 2005	Mount Lemmon	Mount Lemmon Survey	·	2.3 km	MPC · JPL
728157	2010 LB_{86}	—	June 11, 2010	WISE	WISE	ULA	3.9 km	MPC · JPL
728158	2010 LK_{86}	—	June 11, 2010	WISE	WISE	·	2.5 km	MPC · JPL
728159	2010 LS_{86}	—	October 25, 2016	Haleakala	Pan-STARRS 1	·	2.7 km	MPC · JPL
728160	2010 LT_{86}	—	June 11, 2010	WISE	WISE	EOS	3.2 km	MPC · JPL
728161	2010 LO_{88}	—	June 12, 2010	WISE	WISE	·	1.5 km	MPC · JPL
728162	2010 LH_{89}	—	October 20, 2007	Mount Lemmon	Mount Lemmon Survey	URS	3.8 km	MPC · JPL
728163	2010 LS_{89}	—	June 12, 2010	WISE	WISE	·	3.7 km	MPC · JPL
728164	2010 LC_{90}	—	December 22, 2003	Kitt Peak	Spacewatch	·	4.1 km	MPC · JPL
728165	2010 LF_{91}	—	June 12, 2010	WISE	WISE	·	2.0 km	MPC · JPL
728166	2010 LA_{92}	—	October 4, 2006	Mount Lemmon	Mount Lemmon Survey	·	2.8 km	MPC · JPL
728167	2010 LS_{92}	—	June 12, 2010	WISE	WISE	EOS	3.0 km	MPC · JPL
728168	2010 LT_{92}	—	October 9, 2005	Kitt Peak	Spacewatch	EOS	2.9 km	MPC · JPL
728169	2010 LW_{92}	—	June 12, 2010	WISE	WISE	·	5.3 km	MPC · JPL
728170	2010 LZ_{92}	—	June 12, 2010	WISE	WISE	T_{j} (2.99) · (895)	4.3 km	MPC · JPL
728171	2010 LG_{94}	—	June 12, 2010	WISE	WISE	·	1.8 km	MPC · JPL
728172	2010 LN_{94}	—	March 21, 2010	Mount Lemmon	Mount Lemmon Survey	ADE	2.7 km	MPC · JPL
728173	2010 LO_{94}	—	June 12, 2010	WISE	WISE	·	4.5 km	MPC · JPL
728174	2010 LT_{94}	—	June 12, 2010	WISE	WISE	KON	2.6 km	MPC · JPL
728175	2010 LU_{95}	—	October 7, 2005	Mount Lemmon	Mount Lemmon Survey	·	1.7 km	MPC · JPL
728176	2010 LC_{96}	—	April 10, 2003	Kitt Peak	Spacewatch	·	2.4 km	MPC · JPL
728177	2010 LK_{97}	—	June 13, 2010	WISE	WISE	ERI	1.6 km	MPC · JPL
728178	2010 LG_{98}	—	June 13, 2010	WISE	WISE	·	2.3 km	MPC · JPL
728179	2010 LT_{98}	—	June 13, 2010	WISE	WISE	(7605)	3.7 km	MPC · JPL
728180	2010 LX_{98}	—	June 13, 2010	WISE	WISE	·	2.9 km	MPC · JPL
728181	2010 LZ_{101}	—	June 13, 2010	WISE	WISE	KON	2.0 km	MPC · JPL
728182	2010 LD_{103}	—	June 13, 2010	WISE	WISE	·	3.7 km	MPC · JPL
728183	2010 LE_{103}	—	June 13, 2010	WISE	WISE	·	1.2 km	MPC · JPL
728184	2010 LH_{103}	—	October 25, 2005	Catalina	CSS	·	3.3 km	MPC · JPL
728185	2010 LQ_{108}	—	October 21, 2006	Catalina	CSS	·	2.4 km	MPC · JPL
728186	2010 LY_{108}	—	August 25, 1995	Kitt Peak	Spacewatch	EUP	4.4 km	MPC · JPL
728187	2010 LA_{109}	—	June 14, 2010	WISE	WISE	T_{j} (2.99) · EUP · slow	5.2 km	MPC · JPL
728188	2010 LY_{109}	—	June 11, 2010	Mount Lemmon	Mount Lemmon Survey	·	1.3 km	MPC · JPL
728189	2010 LS_{110}	—	December 4, 2008	Mount Lemmon	Mount Lemmon Survey	EUN	950 m	MPC · JPL
728190	2010 LX_{114}	—	June 13, 2010	WISE	WISE	EMA	2.4 km	MPC · JPL
728191	2010 LO_{117}	—	April 30, 2006	Kitt Peak	Spacewatch	ADE	2.0 km	MPC · JPL
728192	2010 LY_{118}	—	June 14, 2010	WISE	WISE	DOR	2.2 km	MPC · JPL
728193	2010 LX_{119}	—	June 14, 2010	WISE	WISE	·	3.1 km	MPC · JPL
728194	2010 LD_{120}	—	June 14, 2010	WISE	WISE	·	2.3 km	MPC · JPL
728195	2010 LP_{120}	—	June 14, 2010	WISE	WISE	·	3.3 km	MPC · JPL
728196	2010 LQ_{120}	—	June 14, 2010	WISE	WISE	VER	2.7 km	MPC · JPL
728197	2010 LA_{121}	—	June 14, 2010	WISE	WISE	·	3.6 km	MPC · JPL
728198	2010 LH_{121}	—	June 14, 2010	WISE	WISE	·	2.2 km	MPC · JPL
728199	2010 LY_{121}	—	April 9, 2003	Kitt Peak	Spacewatch	·	4.4 km	MPC · JPL
728200	2010 LN_{122}	—	June 14, 2010	WISE	WISE	·	2.0 km	MPC · JPL

== 728201–728300 ==
back to top

Designation			Discovery			Properties		Ref
Permanent	Provisional	Named after	Date	Site	Discoverer(s)	Category	Diam.	Ref
728201	2010 LN_{123}	—	October 1, 2008	Kitt Peak	Spacewatch	·	1.7 km	MPC · JPL
728202	2010 LO_{123}	—	April 18, 2006	Kitt Peak	Spacewatch	·	1.9 km	MPC · JPL
728203	2010 LT_{123}	—	June 14, 2010	WISE	WISE	·	2.2 km	MPC · JPL
728204	2010 LV_{124}	—	March 19, 2010	Mount Lemmon	Mount Lemmon Survey	(21885)	2.5 km	MPC · JPL
728205	2010 LA_{126}	—	June 15, 2010	WISE	WISE	URS	3.7 km	MPC · JPL
728206	2010 LF_{127}	—	June 15, 2010	WISE	WISE	·	1.2 km	MPC · JPL
728207	2010 LT_{127}	—	December 28, 1998	Kitt Peak	Spacewatch	·	860 m	MPC · JPL
728208	2010 LY_{127}	—	March 16, 2010	Mount Lemmon	Mount Lemmon Survey	·	2.1 km	MPC · JPL
728209	2010 LN_{129}	—	August 19, 2006	Kitt Peak	Spacewatch	·	3.4 km	MPC · JPL
728210	2010 LV_{129}	—	June 15, 2010	WISE	WISE	·	1.3 km	MPC · JPL
728211	2010 LX_{130}	—	October 1, 2005	Kitt Peak	Spacewatch	·	3.4 km	MPC · JPL
728212	2010 LZ_{130}	—	March 11, 2003	Palomar	NEAT	·	4.7 km	MPC · JPL
728213	2010 LO_{131}	—	June 15, 2010	WISE	WISE	·	3.3 km	MPC · JPL
728214	2010 LV_{131}	—	August 30, 2005	Kitt Peak	Spacewatch	·	2.8 km	MPC · JPL
728215	2010 LW_{134}	—	June 14, 2010	Mount Lemmon	Mount Lemmon Survey	L5	7.8 km	MPC · JPL
728216	2010 LB_{136}	—	June 4, 2010	Haleakala	Pan-STARRS 1	plutino	301 km	MPC · JPL
728217	2010 LF_{138}	—	June 2, 2010	WISE	WISE	URS	2.8 km	MPC · JPL
728218	2010 LD_{140}	—	November 23, 2014	Haleakala	Pan-STARRS 1	·	1.9 km	MPC · JPL
728219	2010 LH_{145}	—	June 12, 2011	Mount Lemmon	Mount Lemmon Survey	·	2.0 km	MPC · JPL
728220	2010 LF_{158}	—	October 22, 2012	Haleakala	Pan-STARRS 1	·	2.4 km	MPC · JPL
728221	2010 LB_{159}	—	April 26, 2010	WISE	WISE	L5	7.5 km	MPC · JPL
728222	2010 LL_{159}	—	June 10, 2010	Mount Lemmon	Mount Lemmon Survey	JUN	930 m	MPC · JPL
728223	2010 LP_{159}	—	June 15, 2010	Mount Lemmon	Mount Lemmon Survey	·	2.7 km	MPC · JPL
728224	2010 MF	—	June 16, 2010	Kitt Peak	Spacewatch	·	1.5 km	MPC · JPL
728225	2010 ML_{1}	—	May 11, 2005	Mount Lemmon	Mount Lemmon Survey	EUP	3.1 km	MPC · JPL
728226	2010 MS_{6}	—	June 16, 2010	WISE	WISE	·	3.6 km	MPC · JPL
728227	2010 MR_{7}	—	June 16, 2010	WISE	WISE	·	3.0 km	MPC · JPL
728228	2010 MH_{8}	—	June 16, 2010	WISE	WISE	·	2.4 km	MPC · JPL
728229	2010 MB_{9}	—	June 16, 2010	WISE	WISE	·	2.1 km	MPC · JPL
728230	2010 ME_{9}	—	October 27, 2008	Kitt Peak	Spacewatch	·	2.5 km	MPC · JPL
728231	2010 MM_{9}	—	June 16, 2010	WISE	WISE	·	2.0 km	MPC · JPL
728232	2010 MT_{9}	—	June 16, 2010	WISE	WISE	·	2.8 km	MPC · JPL
728233	2010 MZ_{9}	—	September 15, 2006	Kitt Peak	Spacewatch	·	2.0 km	MPC · JPL
728234	2010 MG_{11}	—	June 17, 2010	WISE	WISE	EOS	3.0 km	MPC · JPL
728235	2010 MN_{12}	—	June 17, 2010	WISE	WISE	·	3.0 km	MPC · JPL
728236	2010 MO_{12}	—	June 17, 2010	WISE	WISE	·	3.9 km	MPC · JPL
728237	2010 MS_{12}	—	February 7, 2008	Kitt Peak	Spacewatch	(22805)	3.0 km	MPC · JPL
728238	2010 MA_{15}	—	June 17, 2010	WISE	WISE	·	3.1 km	MPC · JPL
728239	2010 ME_{15}	—	October 24, 2005	Kitt Peak	Spacewatch	·	3.6 km	MPC · JPL
728240	2010 MK_{15}	—	March 25, 2010	Mount Lemmon	Mount Lemmon Survey	·	2.6 km	MPC · JPL
728241	2010 ML_{16}	—	October 29, 2005	Mount Lemmon	Mount Lemmon Survey	LIX	4.3 km	MPC · JPL
728242	2010 MZ_{16}	—	June 17, 2010	WISE	WISE	·	3.0 km	MPC · JPL
728243	2010 ME_{17}	—	June 17, 2010	WISE	WISE	·	3.5 km	MPC · JPL
728244	2010 ML_{19}	—	June 18, 2010	WISE	WISE	·	3.3 km	MPC · JPL
728245	2010 MH_{21}	—	March 4, 2001	Kitt Peak	Spacewatch	T_{j} (2.99) · EUP	4.2 km	MPC · JPL
728246	2010 MR_{21}	—	September 27, 2005	Palomar	NEAT	·	2.0 km	MPC · JPL
728247	2010 MN_{22}	—	June 18, 2010	WISE	WISE	·	3.2 km	MPC · JPL
728248	2010 MX_{23}	—	November 21, 2006	Catalina	CSS	EUN	1.9 km	MPC · JPL
728249	2010 MZ_{23}	—	June 18, 2010	WISE	WISE	SYL	3.1 km	MPC · JPL
728250	2010 MA_{24}	—	June 18, 2010	WISE	WISE	·	3.6 km	MPC · JPL
728251	2010 MD_{24}	—	March 3, 2009	Kitt Peak	Spacewatch	·	1.1 km	MPC · JPL
728252	2010 MG_{25}	—	June 18, 2010	WISE	WISE	·	2.5 km	MPC · JPL
728253	2010 MN_{25}	—	October 21, 2003	Kitt Peak	Spacewatch	·	1.9 km	MPC · JPL
728254	2010 MO_{25}	—	June 19, 2010	WISE	WISE	EOS	3.1 km	MPC · JPL
728255	2010 MT_{25}	—	June 19, 2010	WISE	WISE	·	2.6 km	MPC · JPL
728256	2010 MB_{26}	—	July 30, 2005	Palomar	NEAT	·	2.9 km	MPC · JPL
728257	2010 ME_{26}	—	June 19, 2010	WISE	WISE	HOF	2.5 km	MPC · JPL
728258	2010 MG_{27}	—	June 19, 2010	WISE	WISE	EOS	2.0 km	MPC · JPL
728259	2010 MW_{27}	—	June 19, 2010	WISE	WISE	·	1.7 km	MPC · JPL
728260	2010 MU_{28}	—	June 19, 2010	WISE	WISE	·	650 m	MPC · JPL
728261	2010 MV_{28}	—	June 19, 2010	WISE	WISE	·	3.0 km	MPC · JPL
728262	2010 MX_{28}	—	June 19, 2010	WISE	WISE	·	1.7 km	MPC · JPL
728263	2010 MF_{29}	—	June 19, 2010	WISE	WISE	·	2.4 km	MPC · JPL
728264	2010 ML_{30}	—	June 20, 2010	WISE	WISE	EUN	2.1 km	MPC · JPL
728265	2010 MP_{30}	—	June 20, 2010	WISE	WISE	·	2.9 km	MPC · JPL
728266	2010 MQ_{31}	—	June 20, 2010	WISE	WISE	·	2.8 km	MPC · JPL
728267	2010 MB_{32}	—	September 8, 2016	Haleakala	Pan-STARRS 1	LUT	3.6 km	MPC · JPL
728268	2010 MG_{32}	—	June 20, 2010	WISE	WISE	3:2 · SHU	5.1 km	MPC · JPL
728269	2010 MW_{32}	—	October 22, 2003	Kitt Peak	Spacewatch	·	1.4 km	MPC · JPL
728270	2010 MN_{33}	—	June 21, 2010	WISE	WISE	·	3.8 km	MPC · JPL
728271	2010 MT_{33}	—	June 21, 2010	WISE	WISE	CLA	1.5 km	MPC · JPL
728272	2010 MP_{36}	—	September 25, 2001	Palomar	NEAT	·	4.6 km	MPC · JPL
728273	2010 MK_{37}	—	August 9, 2001	Palomar	NEAT	·	2.4 km	MPC · JPL
728274	2010 MM_{37}	—	September 28, 2006	Catalina	CSS	EUN	930 m	MPC · JPL
728275	2010 MP_{37}	—	June 21, 2010	WISE	WISE	·	1.8 km	MPC · JPL
728276	2010 MN_{38}	—	March 4, 2008	Mount Lemmon	Mount Lemmon Survey	·	2.5 km	MPC · JPL
728277	2010 MD_{39}	—	June 21, 2010	WISE	WISE	·	3.1 km	MPC · JPL
728278	2010 MR_{39}	—	June 19, 2004	Kitt Peak	Spacewatch	·	2.9 km	MPC · JPL
728279	2010 MP_{42}	—	April 10, 2005	Kitt Peak	Spacewatch	·	4.1 km	MPC · JPL
728280	2010 MJ_{44}	—	June 22, 2010	WISE	WISE	·	2.6 km	MPC · JPL
728281	2010 MF_{46}	—	June 23, 2010	WISE	WISE	·	1.9 km	MPC · JPL
728282	2010 MB_{47}	—	April 3, 2008	Mount Lemmon	Mount Lemmon Survey	·	3.7 km	MPC · JPL
728283	2010 ME_{47}	—	March 28, 2008	Mount Lemmon	Mount Lemmon Survey	·	2.5 km	MPC · JPL
728284	2010 MC_{48}	—	June 23, 2010	WISE	WISE	·	2.1 km	MPC · JPL
728285	2010 MR_{48}	—	March 11, 2005	Mount Lemmon	Mount Lemmon Survey	·	1.5 km	MPC · JPL
728286	2010 MV_{48}	—	December 30, 2003	Nashville	Clingan, R.	·	3.5 km	MPC · JPL
728287	2010 MH_{50}	—	June 23, 2010	WISE	WISE	EUP	5.1 km	MPC · JPL
728288	2010 MO_{51}	—	June 22, 2010	WISE	WISE	·	1.2 km	MPC · JPL
728289	2010 MA_{52}	—	August 31, 2006	Siding Spring	SSS	T_{j} (2.99)	5.0 km	MPC · JPL
728290	2010 MK_{52}	—	June 27, 2010	WISE	WISE	EUP	4.2 km	MPC · JPL
728291	2010 MB_{54}	—	October 13, 2006	Kitt Peak	Spacewatch	HOF	2.9 km	MPC · JPL
728292	2010 MH_{54}	—	June 16, 2010	WISE	WISE	BRG	2.2 km	MPC · JPL
728293	2010 ME_{55}	—	August 28, 2001	Kitt Peak	Spacewatch	·	3.8 km	MPC · JPL
728294	2010 MU_{55}	—	June 23, 2010	WISE	WISE	·	1.9 km	MPC · JPL
728295	2010 MC_{56}	—	June 23, 2010	WISE	WISE	·	2.0 km	MPC · JPL
728296	2010 MG_{56}	—	June 23, 2010	WISE	WISE	·	1.0 km	MPC · JPL
728297	2010 MP_{57}	—	June 24, 2010	WISE	WISE	·	2.6 km	MPC · JPL
728298	2010 MN_{58}	—	December 1, 2008	Kitt Peak	Spacewatch	·	3.1 km	MPC · JPL
728299	2010 MD_{59}	—	June 24, 2010	WISE	WISE	DOR	2.4 km	MPC · JPL
728300	2010 MN_{59}	—	June 24, 2010	WISE	WISE	·	3.3 km	MPC · JPL

== 728301–728400 ==
back to top

Designation			Discovery			Properties		Ref
Permanent	Provisional	Named after	Date	Site	Discoverer(s)	Category	Diam.	Ref
728301	2010 ME_{60}	—	June 24, 2010	WISE	WISE	·	3.0 km	MPC · JPL
728302	2010 MO_{60}	—	December 1, 2005	Kitt Peak	Spacewatch	·	4.2 km	MPC · JPL
728303	2010 MQ_{62}	—	June 24, 2010	WISE	WISE	·	2.2 km	MPC · JPL
728304	2010 MW_{62}	—	May 5, 2010	Mount Lemmon	Mount Lemmon Survey	·	4.0 km	MPC · JPL
728305	2010 MZ_{62}	—	June 21, 2007	Mount Lemmon	Mount Lemmon Survey	·	2.9 km	MPC · JPL
728306	2010 MU_{63}	—	February 17, 2007	Kitt Peak	Spacewatch	EMA	3.3 km	MPC · JPL
728307	2010 MP_{64}	—	June 24, 2010	WISE	WISE	·	2.9 km	MPC · JPL
728308	2010 MS_{64}	—	June 24, 2010	WISE	WISE	·	4.0 km	MPC · JPL
728309	2010 MC_{65}	—	January 10, 2007	Mount Lemmon	Mount Lemmon Survey	·	1.8 km	MPC · JPL
728310	2010 MK_{65}	—	December 31, 2008	Kitt Peak	Spacewatch	·	3.6 km	MPC · JPL
728311	2010 MJ_{67}	—	October 20, 2006	Kitt Peak	Spacewatch	·	2.3 km	MPC · JPL
728312	2010 MF_{68}	—	June 25, 2010	WISE	WISE	·	3.5 km	MPC · JPL
728313	2010 MS_{68}	—	June 25, 2010	WISE	WISE	·	3.0 km	MPC · JPL
728314	2010 MR_{69}	—	June 25, 2010	WISE	WISE	·	2.5 km	MPC · JPL
728315	2010 MG_{70}	—	May 10, 2010	Mount Lemmon	Mount Lemmon Survey	·	2.8 km	MPC · JPL
728316	2010 MP_{70}	—	June 25, 2010	WISE	WISE	·	6.3 km	MPC · JPL
728317	2010 ML_{71}	—	June 25, 2010	WISE	WISE	EOS	1.7 km	MPC · JPL
728318	2010 MW_{71}	—	June 25, 2010	WISE	WISE	·	4.6 km	MPC · JPL
728319	2010 MD_{73}	—	April 7, 2006	Kitt Peak	Spacewatch	KON	2.4 km	MPC · JPL
728320	2010 MM_{73}	—	June 26, 2010	WISE	WISE	URS	2.5 km	MPC · JPL
728321	2010 MX_{73}	—	June 26, 2010	WISE	WISE	·	4.2 km	MPC · JPL
728322	2010 MB_{74}	—	June 26, 2010	WISE	WISE	·	3.5 km	MPC · JPL
728323	2010 MG_{74}	—	June 26, 2010	WISE	WISE	·	4.8 km	MPC · JPL
728324	2010 MD_{76}	—	June 26, 2010	WISE	WISE	·	4.3 km	MPC · JPL
728325	2010 MN_{77}	—	June 26, 2010	WISE	WISE	·	1.8 km	MPC · JPL
728326	2010 MV_{77}	—	June 26, 2010	WISE	WISE	SYL	3.8 km	MPC · JPL
728327	2010 MX_{77}	—	June 26, 2010	WISE	WISE	·	3.9 km	MPC · JPL
728328	2010 MT_{79}	—	June 26, 2010	WISE	WISE	·	1.2 km	MPC · JPL
728329	2010 MU_{79}	—	June 26, 2010	WISE	WISE	·	3.5 km	MPC · JPL
728330	2010 MO_{80}	—	June 26, 2010	WISE	WISE	ARM	3.5 km	MPC · JPL
728331	2010 MJ_{81}	—	June 27, 2010	WISE	WISE	SYL	3.6 km	MPC · JPL
728332	2010 MC_{82}	—	April 12, 2005	Kitt Peak	Deep Ecliptic Survey	·	2.0 km	MPC · JPL
728333	2010 MK_{83}	—	June 27, 2010	WISE	WISE	·	4.6 km	MPC · JPL
728334	2010 MQ_{83}	—	June 27, 2010	WISE	WISE	·	2.7 km	MPC · JPL
728335	2010 MM_{84}	—	June 27, 2010	WISE	WISE	·	2.8 km	MPC · JPL
728336	2010 MV_{85}	—	June 27, 2010	WISE	WISE	·	3.1 km	MPC · JPL
728337	2010 MD_{86}	—	June 27, 2010	WISE	WISE	T_{j} (2.98)	3.9 km	MPC · JPL
728338	2010 MH_{86}	—	June 27, 2010	WISE	WISE	·	2.9 km	MPC · JPL
728339	2010 MQ_{87}	—	November 3, 2008	Mount Lemmon	Mount Lemmon Survey	·	2.8 km	MPC · JPL
728340	2010 MD_{88}	—	June 29, 2010	WISE	WISE	EUP	3.6 km	MPC · JPL
728341	2010 MB_{89}	—	September 1, 2005	Kitt Peak	Spacewatch	NAE	3.7 km	MPC · JPL
728342	2010 MW_{89}	—	June 27, 2010	WISE	WISE	·	2.3 km	MPC · JPL
728343	2010 MK_{90}	—	June 27, 2010	WISE	WISE	EUP	4.3 km	MPC · JPL
728344	2010 MY_{90}	—	June 28, 2010	WISE	WISE	·	3.0 km	MPC · JPL
728345	2010 MP_{91}	—	June 28, 2010	WISE	WISE	·	1.9 km	MPC · JPL
728346	2010 MU_{92}	—	June 28, 2010	WISE	WISE	·	3.6 km	MPC · JPL
728347	2010 MM_{93}	—	June 28, 2010	WISE	WISE	HOF	2.2 km	MPC · JPL
728348	2010 MK_{94}	—	June 28, 2010	WISE	WISE	·	2.2 km	MPC · JPL
728349	2010 ML_{95}	—	June 28, 2010	WISE	WISE	·	4.4 km	MPC · JPL
728350	2010 MX_{95}	—	April 9, 2003	Palomar	NEAT	·	2.4 km	MPC · JPL
728351	2010 MV_{97}	—	June 28, 2010	WISE	WISE	EUN	2.5 km	MPC · JPL
728352	2010 MX_{97}	—	June 28, 2010	WISE	WISE	·	2.6 km	MPC · JPL
728353	2010 MP_{99}	—	May 5, 2010	Mount Lemmon	Mount Lemmon Survey	·	3.5 km	MPC · JPL
728354	2010 MY_{99}	—	June 29, 2010	WISE	WISE	·	1.9 km	MPC · JPL
728355	2010 MM_{100}	—	March 18, 2010	Siding Spring	SSS	·	2.5 km	MPC · JPL
728356	2010 MK_{101}	—	November 12, 2007	Mount Lemmon	Mount Lemmon Survey	·	2.9 km	MPC · JPL
728357	2010 MR_{101}	—	May 3, 1997	Kitt Peak	Spacewatch	·	1.6 km	MPC · JPL
728358	2010 MU_{103}	—	June 29, 2010	WISE	WISE	EOS	1.6 km	MPC · JPL
728359	2010 MV_{103}	—	June 29, 2010	WISE	WISE	·	2.9 km	MPC · JPL
728360	2010 MJ_{104}	—	June 29, 2010	WISE	WISE	EOS	1.5 km	MPC · JPL
728361	2010 ML_{104}	—	June 29, 2010	WISE	WISE	·	1.7 km	MPC · JPL
728362	2010 MS_{104}	—	May 9, 2006	Mount Lemmon	Mount Lemmon Survey	·	2.6 km	MPC · JPL
728363	2010 MV_{104}	—	June 29, 2010	WISE	WISE	·	2.6 km	MPC · JPL
728364	2010 ML_{105}	—	January 8, 2010	WISE	WISE	·	1.4 km	MPC · JPL
728365	2010 MS_{105}	—	June 30, 2010	WISE	WISE	·	2.5 km	MPC · JPL
728366	2010 MF_{106}	—	March 12, 2010	Kitt Peak	Spacewatch	·	2.4 km	MPC · JPL
728367	2010 MC_{107}	—	June 30, 2010	WISE	WISE	·	5.1 km	MPC · JPL
728368	2010 MR_{107}	—	July 25, 2001	Haleakala	NEAT	·	2.6 km	MPC · JPL
728369	2010 MF_{108}	—	February 17, 2004	Kitt Peak	Spacewatch	·	3.5 km	MPC · JPL
728370	2010 MK_{108}	—	February 9, 2005	Kitt Peak	Spacewatch	·	1.6 km	MPC · JPL
728371	2010 MC_{109}	—	June 30, 2010	WISE	WISE	·	2.5 km	MPC · JPL
728372	2010 MG_{109}	—	June 30, 2010	WISE	WISE	·	2.8 km	MPC · JPL
728373	2010 MH_{110}	—	June 30, 2010	WISE	WISE	·	3.8 km	MPC · JPL
728374	2010 MN_{110}	—	July 4, 2010	WISE	WISE	LIX	3.4 km	MPC · JPL
728375	2010 MU_{110}	—	September 19, 2006	Kitt Peak	Spacewatch	LIX	3.1 km	MPC · JPL
728376	2010 MA_{111}	—	June 30, 2010	WISE	WISE	·	3.0 km	MPC · JPL
728377	2010 MQ_{111}	—	November 24, 2008	Kitt Peak	Spacewatch	·	2.8 km	MPC · JPL
728378	2010 MS_{116}	—	October 16, 1999	Apache Point	SDSS	L5	8.1 km	MPC · JPL
728379	2010 MX_{116}	—	June 18, 2010	Mount Lemmon	Mount Lemmon Survey	LIX	3.1 km	MPC · JPL
728380	2010 MJ_{121}	—	June 18, 2010	WISE	WISE	·	1.5 km	MPC · JPL
728381	2010 MX_{139}	—	January 1, 2014	Haleakala	Pan-STARRS 1	·	1.2 km	MPC · JPL
728382	2010 MP_{140}	—	October 28, 2013	Mount Lemmon	Mount Lemmon Survey	·	2.7 km	MPC · JPL
728383	2010 MJ_{147}	—	April 26, 2010	WISE	WISE	L5	10 km	MPC · JPL
728384	2010 MN_{147}	—	June 21, 2010	Mount Lemmon	Mount Lemmon Survey	·	620 m	MPC · JPL
728385	2010 MT_{147}	—	April 24, 2014	Mount Lemmon	Mount Lemmon Survey	·	1.3 km	MPC · JPL
728386	2010 MW_{147}	—	November 21, 2014	Haleakala	Pan-STARRS 1	L5	7.6 km	MPC · JPL
728387	2010 MA_{148}	—	September 22, 2011	Kitt Peak	Spacewatch	·	1.5 km	MPC · JPL
728388	2010 MR_{148}	—	September 17, 2017	Haleakala	Pan-STARRS 1	·	2.5 km	MPC · JPL
728389	2010 MT_{148}	—	September 11, 2016	Mount Lemmon	Mount Lemmon Survey	H	450 m	MPC · JPL
728390	2010 MJ_{150}	—	June 22, 2010	Mount Lemmon	Mount Lemmon Survey	·	580 m	MPC · JPL
728391	2010 NT_{7}	—	July 4, 2010	WISE	WISE	·	2.0 km	MPC · JPL
728392	2010 NL_{8}	—	April 5, 2010	Kitt Peak	Spacewatch	·	2.1 km	MPC · JPL
728393	2010 NJ_{9}	—	February 11, 2004	Palomar	NEAT	LIX	3.6 km	MPC · JPL
728394	2010 NW_{9}	—	July 5, 2010	WISE	WISE	·	2.5 km	MPC · JPL
728395	2010 ND_{10}	—	July 5, 2010	WISE	WISE	·	1.9 km	MPC · JPL
728396	2010 NP_{10}	—	March 12, 2010	Kitt Peak	Spacewatch	·	2.9 km	MPC · JPL
728397	2010 NB_{11}	—	July 5, 2010	WISE	WISE	·	1.8 km	MPC · JPL
728398	2010 NK_{11}	—	July 5, 2010	WISE	WISE	·	2.4 km	MPC · JPL
728399	2010 NF_{12}	—	July 5, 2010	WISE	WISE	·	2.1 km	MPC · JPL
728400	2010 NC_{13}	—	July 5, 2010	WISE	WISE	BRG	1.4 km	MPC · JPL

== 728401–728500 ==
back to top

Designation			Discovery			Properties		Ref
Permanent	Provisional	Named after	Date	Site	Discoverer(s)	Category	Diam.	Ref
728401	2010 NR_{13}	—	July 6, 2010	Kitt Peak	Spacewatch	·	4.4 km	MPC · JPL
728402	2010 NK_{15}	—	July 5, 2010	WISE	WISE	·	3.2 km	MPC · JPL
728403	2010 NR_{15}	—	October 5, 2002	Apache Point	SDSS Collaboration	3:2 · SHU	4.4 km	MPC · JPL
728404	2010 NH_{23}	—	March 18, 2010	Kitt Peak	Spacewatch	·	2.3 km	MPC · JPL
728405	2010 NX_{23}	—	July 6, 2010	WISE	WISE	·	3.9 km	MPC · JPL
728406	2010 NB_{24}	—	July 6, 2010	WISE	WISE	·	5.8 km	MPC · JPL
728407	2010 NY_{25}	—	July 7, 2010	WISE	WISE	·	3.0 km	MPC · JPL
728408	2010 NL_{26}	—	July 7, 2010	WISE	WISE	·	3.0 km	MPC · JPL
728409	2010 NV_{26}	—	March 18, 2010	Kitt Peak	Spacewatch	·	2.4 km	MPC · JPL
728410	2010 NQ_{28}	—	April 13, 2010	Siding Spring	SSS	PHO	1.1 km	MPC · JPL
728411	2010 NO_{29}	—	December 22, 2005	Catalina	CSS	·	2.4 km	MPC · JPL
728412	2010 NB_{30}	—	July 7, 2010	WISE	WISE	·	2.8 km	MPC · JPL
728413	2010 NO_{30}	—	July 7, 2010	WISE	WISE	·	2.3 km	MPC · JPL
728414	2010 NT_{30}	—	March 9, 2002	Kitt Peak	Spacewatch	·	4.1 km	MPC · JPL
728415	2010 NG_{31}	—	July 7, 2010	WISE	WISE	TRE	1.7 km	MPC · JPL
728416	2010 NN_{31}	—	April 5, 2010	Kitt Peak	Spacewatch	·	2.0 km	MPC · JPL
728417	2010 NO_{32}	—	September 3, 2007	Mount Lemmon	Mount Lemmon Survey	·	1.5 km	MPC · JPL
728418	2010 NP_{33}	—	August 16, 2001	Palomar	NEAT	·	5.4 km	MPC · JPL
728419	2010 NG_{34}	—	July 8, 2010	Kitt Peak	Spacewatch	·	2.8 km	MPC · JPL
728420	2010 NO_{34}	—	July 8, 2010	WISE	WISE	EOS	1.7 km	MPC · JPL
728421	2010 NY_{34}	—	July 8, 2010	WISE	WISE	·	2.3 km	MPC · JPL
728422	2010 NA_{35}	—	July 8, 2010	WISE	WISE	·	1.8 km	MPC · JPL
728423	2010 NW_{35}	—	July 8, 2010	WISE	WISE	·	3.8 km	MPC · JPL
728424	2010 NF_{36}	—	July 8, 2010	WISE	WISE	·	2.2 km	MPC · JPL
728425	2010 NZ_{37}	—	July 8, 2010	WISE	WISE	·	3.6 km	MPC · JPL
728426	2010 NP_{38}	—	July 8, 2010	WISE	WISE	·	6.0 km	MPC · JPL
728427	2010 NC_{39}	—	May 4, 2009	Mount Lemmon	Mount Lemmon Survey	·	2.9 km	MPC · JPL
728428	2010 NW_{39}	—	February 26, 2007	Catalina	CSS	·	5.3 km	MPC · JPL
728429	2010 NS_{43}	—	October 4, 2006	Mount Lemmon	Mount Lemmon Survey	·	2.2 km	MPC · JPL
728430	2010 NC_{44}	—	July 9, 2010	WISE	WISE	·	2.0 km	MPC · JPL
728431	2010 NJ_{45}	—	July 9, 2010	WISE	WISE	(5)	2.1 km	MPC · JPL
728432	2010 NW_{45}	—	July 9, 2010	WISE	WISE	PHO	1.6 km	MPC · JPL
728433	2010 NM_{47}	—	July 9, 2010	WISE	WISE	LIX	3.7 km	MPC · JPL
728434	2010 NZ_{47}	—	July 9, 2010	WISE	WISE	·	1.7 km	MPC · JPL
728435	2010 NL_{49}	—	July 9, 2010	WISE	WISE	KON	2.5 km	MPC · JPL
728436	2010 NR_{51}	—	July 10, 2010	WISE	WISE	·	2.8 km	MPC · JPL
728437	2010 NX_{53}	—	July 10, 2010	WISE	WISE	·	3.0 km	MPC · JPL
728438	2010 NT_{54}	—	November 1, 2005	Mount Lemmon	Mount Lemmon Survey	LIX	3.2 km	MPC · JPL
728439	2010 NX_{54}	—	July 10, 2010	WISE	WISE	EUP	4.0 km	MPC · JPL
728440	2010 NW_{57}	—	July 10, 2010	WISE	WISE	ADE	2.1 km	MPC · JPL
728441	2010 NN_{58}	—	July 10, 2010	WISE	WISE	·	2.1 km	MPC · JPL
728442	2010 NO_{58}	—	November 29, 1999	Kitt Peak	Spacewatch	·	3.8 km	MPC · JPL
728443	2010 NP_{58}	—	July 10, 2010	WISE	WISE	·	3.1 km	MPC · JPL
728444	2010 NX_{58}	—	March 17, 2004	Apache Point	SDSS Collaboration	·	4.1 km	MPC · JPL
728445	2010 NT_{61}	—	July 11, 2010	WISE	WISE	·	1.6 km	MPC · JPL
728446	2010 NW_{61}	—	April 13, 2010	Mount Lemmon	Mount Lemmon Survey	·	2.6 km	MPC · JPL
728447	2010 NO_{62}	—	October 14, 2007	Mount Lemmon	Mount Lemmon Survey	·	2.4 km	MPC · JPL
728448	2010 NE_{65}	—	July 11, 2010	WISE	WISE	·	3.3 km	MPC · JPL
728449	2010 NF_{65}	—	July 11, 2010	WISE	WISE	EOS	2.8 km	MPC · JPL
728450	2010 NM_{65}	—	November 6, 2005	Kitt Peak	Spacewatch	·	5.4 km	MPC · JPL
728451	2010 NV_{65}	—	June 25, 2017	Mount Lemmon	Mount Lemmon Survey	(69559)	3.5 km	MPC · JPL
728452	2010 NW_{67}	—	July 14, 2010	WISE	WISE	·	2.7 km	MPC · JPL
728453	2010 NJ_{68}	—	July 14, 2010	WISE	WISE	LUT	3.3 km	MPC · JPL
728454	2010 NO_{68}	—	July 14, 2010	WISE	WISE	EOS	2.8 km	MPC · JPL
728455	2010 NW_{69}	—	September 9, 2007	Kitt Peak	Spacewatch	·	2.7 km	MPC · JPL
728456	2010 NE_{70}	—	July 14, 2010	WISE	WISE	·	3.2 km	MPC · JPL
728457	2010 NQ_{70}	—	July 14, 2010	WISE	WISE	·	3.4 km	MPC · JPL
728458	2010 NB_{72}	—	July 14, 2010	WISE	WISE	·	3.5 km	MPC · JPL
728459	2010 NC_{72}	—	May 13, 2010	Mount Lemmon	Mount Lemmon Survey	·	1.5 km	MPC · JPL
728460	2010 NZ_{74}	—	July 15, 2010	WISE	WISE	EOS	1.5 km	MPC · JPL
728461	2010 NB_{76}	—	August 12, 2006	Palomar	NEAT	·	1.7 km	MPC · JPL
728462	2010 NC_{76}	—	July 15, 2010	WISE	WISE	·	2.7 km	MPC · JPL
728463	2010 NS_{77}	—	July 16, 2004	Siding Spring	SSS	T_{j} (2.96)	2.9 km	MPC · JPL
728464	2010 NN_{78}	—	July 15, 2010	WISE	WISE	·	3.9 km	MPC · JPL
728465	2010 ND_{80}	—	February 23, 2007	Mount Lemmon	Mount Lemmon Survey	·	2.1 km	MPC · JPL
728466	2010 NZ_{82}	—	January 14, 2010	WISE	WISE	·	1.4 km	MPC · JPL
728467	2010 NE_{83}	—	July 1, 2010	WISE	WISE	·	3.1 km	MPC · JPL
728468	2010 NH_{83}	—	July 1, 2010	WISE	WISE	VER	3.6 km	MPC · JPL
728469	2010 NB_{84}	—	July 1, 2010	WISE	WISE	·	3.6 km	MPC · JPL
728470	2010 NV_{84}	—	August 22, 1995	Kitt Peak	Spacewatch	·	4.6 km	MPC · JPL
728471	2010 NM_{85}	—	January 31, 2004	Apache Point	SDSS Collaboration	·	3.7 km	MPC · JPL
728472	2010 NE_{86}	—	July 1, 2010	WISE	WISE	·	2.9 km	MPC · JPL
728473	2010 NR_{86}	—	July 1, 2010	WISE	WISE	·	2.8 km	MPC · JPL
728474	2010 NR_{87}	—	July 6, 2010	WISE	WISE	·	1.7 km	MPC · JPL
728475	2010 NM_{88}	—	July 2, 2010	WISE	WISE	SYL	4.2 km	MPC · JPL
728476	2010 NA_{89}	—	April 6, 2010	Catalina	CSS	ADE	2.1 km	MPC · JPL
728477	2010 NO_{89}	—	November 22, 2006	Kitt Peak	Spacewatch	·	1.7 km	MPC · JPL
728478	2010 NX_{89}	—	September 15, 2007	Kitt Peak	Spacewatch	NEM	1.9 km	MPC · JPL
728479	2010 NE_{90}	—	January 14, 2010	WISE	WISE	·	2.9 km	MPC · JPL
728480	2010 NC_{91}	—	November 4, 2007	Mount Lemmon	Mount Lemmon Survey	·	3.0 km	MPC · JPL
728481	2010 NB_{93}	—	July 3, 2010	WISE	WISE	·	4.4 km	MPC · JPL
728482	2010 NT_{94}	—	April 15, 2010	Mount Lemmon	Mount Lemmon Survey	·	2.9 km	MPC · JPL
728483	2010 NP_{97}	—	July 11, 2010	WISE	WISE	·	3.5 km	MPC · JPL
728484	2010 NC_{98}	—	July 11, 2010	WISE	WISE	·	1.7 km	MPC · JPL
728485	2010 NE_{98}	—	July 11, 2010	WISE	WISE	VER	2.5 km	MPC · JPL
728486	2010 NP_{99}	—	July 12, 2010	WISE	WISE	·	3.1 km	MPC · JPL
728487	2010 NP_{101}	—	November 15, 2006	Mount Lemmon	Mount Lemmon Survey	·	2.3 km	MPC · JPL
728488	2010 NS_{102}	—	August 11, 2001	Palomar	NEAT	·	1.9 km	MPC · JPL
728489	2010 NY_{102}	—	February 1, 2006	Kitt Peak	Spacewatch	·	4.0 km	MPC · JPL
728490	2010 NE_{103}	—	July 12, 2010	WISE	WISE	·	4.0 km	MPC · JPL
728491	2010 NR_{103}	—	July 12, 2010	WISE	WISE	·	3.6 km	MPC · JPL
728492	2010 NT_{103}	—	July 12, 2010	WISE	WISE	·	3.8 km	MPC · JPL
728493	2010 NW_{104}	—	July 12, 2010	WISE	WISE	·	3.9 km	MPC · JPL
728494	2010 NA_{107}	—	March 21, 1999	Apache Point	SDSS Collaboration	·	2.2 km	MPC · JPL
728495	2010 NJ_{107}	—	July 13, 2010	WISE	WISE	EOS	2.6 km	MPC · JPL
728496	2010 NL_{107}	—	July 13, 2010	WISE	WISE	·	2.3 km	MPC · JPL
728497	2010 NQ_{107}	—	July 13, 2010	WISE	WISE	·	2.3 km	MPC · JPL
728498	2010 NM_{109}	—	August 27, 2005	Palomar	NEAT	·	2.4 km	MPC · JPL
728499	2010 NP_{111}	—	September 18, 1999	Kitt Peak	Spacewatch	EUP	4.1 km	MPC · JPL
728500	2010 NM_{112}	—	July 13, 2010	WISE	WISE	TRE	3.0 km	MPC · JPL

== 728501–728600 ==
back to top

Designation			Discovery			Properties		Ref
Permanent	Provisional	Named after	Date	Site	Discoverer(s)	Category	Diam.	Ref
728501	2010 ND_{113}	—	December 16, 2007	Mount Lemmon	Mount Lemmon Survey	·	3.4 km	MPC · JPL
728502	2010 NR_{113}	—	July 13, 2010	WISE	WISE	·	2.6 km	MPC · JPL
728503	2010 NO_{114}	—	July 14, 2010	WISE	WISE	·	2.4 km	MPC · JPL
728504	2010 NR_{114}	—	July 14, 2010	WISE	WISE	·	3.2 km	MPC · JPL
728505	2010 NQ_{115}	—	May 7, 2010	Mount Lemmon	Mount Lemmon Survey	DOR	2.6 km	MPC · JPL
728506	2010 NC_{127}	—	May 13, 2010	Mount Lemmon	Mount Lemmon Survey	·	2.4 km	MPC · JPL
728507	2010 NS_{144}	—	September 25, 2006	Kitt Peak	Spacewatch	·	3.1 km	MPC · JPL
728508	2010 NX_{146}	—	April 1, 2014	Mount Lemmon	Mount Lemmon Survey	·	1.4 km	MPC · JPL
728509	2010 NJ_{147}	—	May 1, 2010	WISE	WISE	·	1.6 km	MPC · JPL
728510	2010 NT_{147}	—	October 25, 2011	Haleakala	Pan-STARRS 1	·	1.5 km	MPC · JPL
728511	2010 NV_{147}	—	April 21, 2010	WISE	WISE	·	2.0 km	MPC · JPL
728512	2010 NZ_{147}	—	July 4, 2010	Mount Lemmon	Mount Lemmon Survey	L5	8.4 km	MPC · JPL
728513	2010 ON	—	July 16, 2010	WISE	WISE	T_{j} (2.99) · EUP	4.8 km	MPC · JPL
728514	2010 OV_{1}	—	July 16, 2010	WISE	WISE	EOS	3.5 km	MPC · JPL
728515	2010 OT_{2}	—	February 3, 2009	Kitt Peak	Spacewatch	3:2	4.7 km	MPC · JPL
728516	2010 OX_{2}	—	November 20, 2006	Kitt Peak	Spacewatch	3:2	3.9 km	MPC · JPL
728517	2010 ON_{3}	—	July 8, 2005	Kitt Peak	Spacewatch	·	2.3 km	MPC · JPL
728518	2010 OC_{5}	—	October 25, 2005	Kitt Peak	Spacewatch	EOS	1.6 km	MPC · JPL
728519	2010 OF_{5}	—	July 16, 2010	WISE	WISE	·	3.8 km	MPC · JPL
728520	2010 OY_{6}	—	August 14, 2006	Palomar	NEAT	DOR	2.1 km	MPC · JPL
728521	2010 OT_{7}	—	July 16, 2010	WISE	WISE	·	3.7 km	MPC · JPL
728522	2010 OR_{9}	—	December 9, 2006	Kitt Peak	Spacewatch	HOF	2.8 km	MPC · JPL
728523	2010 OM_{10}	—	July 18, 2005	Palomar	NEAT	DOR	1.6 km	MPC · JPL
728524	2010 OQ_{10}	—	July 16, 2010	WISE	WISE	ADE	2.2 km	MPC · JPL
728525	2010 OB_{12}	—	July 17, 2010	WISE	WISE	EOS	3.6 km	MPC · JPL
728526	2010 OH_{12}	—	January 23, 2010	WISE	WISE	·	4.0 km	MPC · JPL
728527	2010 OZ_{12}	—	July 17, 2010	WISE	WISE	·	2.9 km	MPC · JPL
728528	2010 OG_{13}	—	August 29, 2006	Kitt Peak	Spacewatch	·	3.9 km	MPC · JPL
728529	2010 OM_{13}	—	July 17, 2010	WISE	WISE	DOR	2.7 km	MPC · JPL
728530	2010 OS_{14}	—	July 17, 2010	WISE	WISE	3:2 · SHU	6.1 km	MPC · JPL
728531	2010 OW_{14}	—	July 17, 2010	WISE	WISE	·	2.0 km	MPC · JPL
728532	2010 OC_{15}	—	January 25, 2010	WISE	WISE	·	1.8 km	MPC · JPL
728533	2010 OO_{15}	—	July 17, 2010	WISE	WISE	·	2.2 km	MPC · JPL
728534	2010 OZ_{15}	—	July 17, 2010	WISE	WISE	EOS	3.3 km	MPC · JPL
728535	2010 OC_{16}	—	October 29, 2005	Mount Lemmon	Mount Lemmon Survey	THM	1.8 km	MPC · JPL
728536	2010 OJ_{16}	—	July 17, 2010	WISE	WISE	·	3.8 km	MPC · JPL
728537	2010 OL_{18}	—	July 18, 2010	WISE	WISE	·	2.3 km	MPC · JPL
728538	2010 OO_{18}	—	July 18, 2010	WISE	WISE	·	2.5 km	MPC · JPL
728539	2010 OR_{20}	—	July 18, 2010	WISE	WISE	·	1.6 km	MPC · JPL
728540	2010 OA_{21}	—	July 18, 2010	WISE	WISE	·	3.8 km	MPC · JPL
728541	2010 OE_{24}	—	July 18, 2010	WISE	WISE	·	3.8 km	MPC · JPL
728542	2010 OE_{26}	—	July 19, 2010	WISE	WISE	ADE	1.9 km	MPC · JPL
728543	2010 OH_{28}	—	October 7, 2004	Kitt Peak	Spacewatch	·	3.7 km	MPC · JPL
728544	2010 OT_{28}	—	August 14, 2004	Cerro Tololo	Deep Ecliptic Survey	·	3.0 km	MPC · JPL
728545	2010 OG_{29}	—	July 19, 2010	WISE	WISE	LIX	2.5 km	MPC · JPL
728546	2010 OK_{29}	—	December 1, 2005	Kitt Peak	Spacewatch	·	3.4 km	MPC · JPL
728547	2010 OL_{29}	—	July 19, 2010	WISE	WISE	·	3.3 km	MPC · JPL
728548	2010 OE_{30}	—	August 28, 2001	Palomar	NEAT	·	2.6 km	MPC · JPL
728549	2010 OL_{31}	—	November 24, 2006	Mount Lemmon	Mount Lemmon Survey	·	2.9 km	MPC · JPL
728550	2010 OP_{32}	—	July 20, 2010	WISE	WISE	·	1.8 km	MPC · JPL
728551	2010 OQ_{32}	—	January 27, 2010	WISE	WISE	URS	3.0 km	MPC · JPL
728552	2010 OD_{33}	—	December 24, 2005	Kitt Peak	Spacewatch	·	2.0 km	MPC · JPL
728553	2010 OH_{33}	—	May 3, 2008	Mount Lemmon	Mount Lemmon Survey	(21885)	4.0 km	MPC · JPL
728554	2010 OZ_{34}	—	July 20, 2010	WISE	WISE	EUN	1.0 km	MPC · JPL
728555	2010 OH_{36}	—	January 24, 2007	Mount Nyukasa	Japan Aerospace Exploration Agency	·	5.2 km	MPC · JPL
728556	2010 OR_{36}	—	July 21, 2010	WISE	WISE	·	2.4 km	MPC · JPL
728557	2010 OW_{39}	—	July 21, 2010	WISE	WISE	·	2.7 km	MPC · JPL
728558	2010 OH_{40}	—	July 21, 2010	WISE	WISE	URS	2.4 km	MPC · JPL
728559	2010 OT_{40}	—	July 21, 2010	WISE	WISE	·	3.8 km	MPC · JPL
728560	2010 OV_{40}	—	July 21, 2010	WISE	WISE	GEF	1.7 km	MPC · JPL
728561	2010 OJ_{41}	—	September 22, 2001	Palomar	NEAT	·	1.8 km	MPC · JPL
728562	2010 OM_{42}	—	July 21, 2010	WISE	WISE	·	2.0 km	MPC · JPL
728563	2010 OC_{43}	—	July 21, 2010	WISE	WISE	·	3.2 km	MPC · JPL
728564	2010 OJ_{43}	—	July 21, 2010	WISE	WISE	·	5.5 km	MPC · JPL
728565	2010 OW_{43}	—	July 21, 2010	WISE	WISE	·	3.4 km	MPC · JPL
728566	2010 OR_{44}	—	January 15, 2009	Kitt Peak	Spacewatch	·	4.1 km	MPC · JPL
728567	2010 OE_{45}	—	May 10, 2010	Mount Lemmon	Mount Lemmon Survey	·	1.6 km	MPC · JPL
728568	2010 OY_{45}	—	July 22, 2010	WISE	WISE	·	2.2 km	MPC · JPL
728569	2010 OB_{46}	—	January 27, 2010	WISE	WISE	·	2.1 km	MPC · JPL
728570	2010 OB_{47}	—	July 22, 2010	WISE	WISE	·	2.3 km	MPC · JPL
728571	2010 OZ_{48}	—	October 15, 2001	Kitt Peak	Spacewatch	·	2.0 km	MPC · JPL
728572	2010 OP_{50}	—	July 22, 2010	WISE	WISE	·	3.1 km	MPC · JPL
728573	2010 OQ_{51}	—	July 22, 2010	WISE	WISE	·	2.1 km	MPC · JPL
728574	2010 OW_{52}	—	July 22, 2010	WISE	WISE	·	2.9 km	MPC · JPL
728575	2010 OQ_{57}	—	January 28, 2010	WISE	WISE	LIX	4.0 km	MPC · JPL
728576	2010 OO_{58}	—	December 29, 2003	Kitt Peak	Spacewatch	·	1.1 km	MPC · JPL
728577	2010 OY_{58}	—	January 1, 2009	Kitt Peak	Spacewatch	·	2.2 km	MPC · JPL
728578	2010 OH_{59}	—	July 23, 2010	WISE	WISE	·	2.1 km	MPC · JPL
728579	2010 OF_{60}	—	June 28, 2005	Palomar	NEAT	·	2.0 km	MPC · JPL
728580	2010 OT_{60}	—	July 23, 2010	WISE	WISE	·	2.6 km	MPC · JPL
728581	2010 OL_{61}	—	July 24, 2010	WISE	WISE	·	2.9 km	MPC · JPL
728582	2010 OR_{61}	—	August 27, 2005	Palomar	NEAT	·	1.9 km	MPC · JPL
728583	2010 OU_{61}	—	July 24, 2010	WISE	WISE	·	2.6 km	MPC · JPL
728584	2010 OW_{61}	—	January 25, 2010	WISE	WISE	LIX	3.0 km	MPC · JPL
728585	2010 OE_{62}	—	February 28, 2014	Haleakala	Pan-STARRS 1	·	1.3 km	MPC · JPL
728586	2010 ON_{63}	—	July 24, 2010	WISE	WISE	EMA	3.0 km	MPC · JPL
728587	2010 OX_{64}	—	March 31, 2008	Mount Lemmon	Mount Lemmon Survey	·	2.2 km	MPC · JPL
728588	2010 OJ_{65}	—	January 17, 2004	Palomar	NEAT	·	2.7 km	MPC · JPL
728589	2010 OM_{66}	—	July 24, 2010	WISE	WISE	NAE	2.0 km	MPC · JPL
728590	2010 OK_{67}	—	July 24, 2010	WISE	WISE	·	3.0 km	MPC · JPL
728591	2010 OU_{67}	—	January 31, 2009	Kitt Peak	Spacewatch	HYG	2.2 km	MPC · JPL
728592	2010 OG_{68}	—	September 11, 2004	Socorro	LINEAR	·	4.2 km	MPC · JPL
728593	2010 OZ_{70}	—	July 25, 2010	WISE	WISE	·	2.6 km	MPC · JPL
728594	2010 OG_{71}	—	May 1, 2009	Kitt Peak	Spacewatch	ADE	1.8 km	MPC · JPL
728595	2010 OW_{71}	—	January 16, 2009	Mount Lemmon	Mount Lemmon Survey	·	2.1 km	MPC · JPL
728596	2010 OH_{72}	—	July 25, 2010	WISE	WISE	·	1.9 km	MPC · JPL
728597	2010 OO_{72}	—	July 25, 2010	WISE	WISE	·	4.1 km	MPC · JPL
728598	2010 OY_{72}	—	July 25, 2010	WISE	WISE	·	3.3 km	MPC · JPL
728599	2010 OZ_{72}	—	July 25, 2010	WISE	WISE	·	2.0 km	MPC · JPL
728600	2010 OP_{73}	—	July 25, 2010	WISE	WISE	·	2.7 km	MPC · JPL

== 728601–728700 ==
back to top

Designation			Discovery			Properties		Ref
Permanent	Provisional	Named after	Date	Site	Discoverer(s)	Category	Diam.	Ref
728601	2010 OH_{74}	—	July 25, 2010	WISE	WISE	EOS	1.4 km	MPC · JPL
728602	2010 OX_{74}	—	July 25, 2010	WISE	WISE	·	3.0 km	MPC · JPL
728603	2010 OB_{75}	—	September 13, 2004	Palomar	NEAT	T_{j} (2.99) · EUP	2.1 km	MPC · JPL
728604	2010 OT_{75}	—	July 26, 2010	WISE	WISE	·	4.1 km	MPC · JPL
728605	2010 OU_{76}	—	July 25, 2010	WISE	WISE	·	2.0 km	MPC · JPL
728606	2010 OX_{76}	—	July 19, 2001	Palomar	NEAT	3:2 · SHU	6.6 km	MPC · JPL
728607	2010 OH_{77}	—	July 25, 2010	WISE	WISE	·	2.0 km	MPC · JPL
728608	2010 OJ_{77}	—	April 20, 2006	Kitt Peak	Spacewatch	·	1.9 km	MPC · JPL
728609	2010 OY_{78}	—	July 31, 2001	Palomar	NEAT	·	2.6 km	MPC · JPL
728610	2010 OL_{79}	—	July 26, 2010	WISE	WISE	·	3.7 km	MPC · JPL
728611	2010 OA_{80}	—	July 26, 2010	WISE	WISE	·	3.0 km	MPC · JPL
728612	2010 OL_{80}	—	November 18, 2006	Lulin	LUSS	ADE	2.8 km	MPC · JPL
728613	2010 OS_{80}	—	April 17, 2010	Kitt Peak	Spacewatch	·	2.5 km	MPC · JPL
728614	2010 OE_{81}	—	July 26, 2010	WISE	WISE	·	2.9 km	MPC · JPL
728615	2010 OC_{82}	—	May 6, 2010	Mount Lemmon	Mount Lemmon Survey	EOS	3.9 km	MPC · JPL
728616	2010 OJ_{82}	—	July 26, 2010	WISE	WISE	LUT	5.2 km	MPC · JPL
728617	2010 OW_{82}	—	August 14, 2001	Haleakala	NEAT	ADE	1.7 km	MPC · JPL
728618	2010 OH_{84}	—	July 26, 2010	WISE	WISE	·	3.0 km	MPC · JPL
728619	2010 OL_{84}	—	July 26, 2010	WISE	WISE	·	1.6 km	MPC · JPL
728620	2010 OJ_{85}	—	March 23, 2003	Apache Point	SDSS Collaboration	ADE	2.3 km	MPC · JPL
728621	2010 OM_{85}	—	December 2, 2005	Mount Lemmon	Mount Lemmon Survey	·	3.4 km	MPC · JPL
728622	2010 OG_{86}	—	July 27, 2010	WISE	WISE	·	2.6 km	MPC · JPL
728623	2010 OJ_{86}	—	July 27, 2010	WISE	WISE	·	4.1 km	MPC · JPL
728624	2010 OU_{87}	—	April 14, 2010	Kitt Peak	Spacewatch	KON	2.2 km	MPC · JPL
728625	2010 OA_{88}	—	March 4, 2008	Kitt Peak	Spacewatch	LIX	4.0 km	MPC · JPL
728626	2010 OH_{88}	—	February 22, 2003	Palomar	NEAT	·	2.9 km	MPC · JPL
728627	2010 OX_{89}	—	July 27, 2010	WISE	WISE	·	2.8 km	MPC · JPL
728628	2010 OU_{90}	—	July 27, 2010	WISE	WISE	·	3.3 km	MPC · JPL
728629	2010 OZ_{90}	—	July 27, 2010	WISE	WISE	·	4.0 km	MPC · JPL
728630	2010 OC_{91}	—	July 27, 2010	WISE	WISE	·	1.5 km	MPC · JPL
728631	2010 OD_{91}	—	October 9, 2007	Kitt Peak	Spacewatch	HOF	2.6 km	MPC · JPL
728632	2010 OJ_{91}	—	July 27, 2010	WISE	WISE	·	4.0 km	MPC · JPL
728633	2010 OW_{91}	—	August 21, 2004	Siding Spring	SSS	·	4.5 km	MPC · JPL
728634	2010 OE_{92}	—	July 27, 2010	WISE	WISE	·	3.6 km	MPC · JPL
728635	2010 OL_{92}	—	April 26, 2010	Mount Lemmon	Mount Lemmon Survey	·	3.2 km	MPC · JPL
728636	2010 OZ_{92}	—	February 28, 2008	Kitt Peak	Spacewatch	HOF	2.4 km	MPC · JPL
728637	2010 OG_{94}	—	July 11, 2004	Palomar	NEAT	·	4.8 km	MPC · JPL
728638	2010 OP_{94}	—	December 22, 2003	Kitt Peak	Spacewatch	PHO	2.4 km	MPC · JPL
728639	2010 OX_{94}	—	April 18, 2015	Cerro Tololo-DECam	DECam	·	3.5 km	MPC · JPL
728640	2010 OC_{96}	—	December 2, 2005	Kitt Peak	Spacewatch	·	3.1 km	MPC · JPL
728641	2010 OT_{97}	—	July 28, 2010	WISE	WISE	·	1.9 km	MPC · JPL
728642	2010 OM_{100}	—	July 28, 2010	WISE	WISE	EUP	5.2 km	MPC · JPL
728643	2010 OF_{102}	—	July 28, 2010	WISE	WISE	·	4.3 km	MPC · JPL
728644	2010 OO_{102}	—	July 28, 2010	WISE	WISE	PHO	1.7 km	MPC · JPL
728645	2010 OK_{104}	—	July 29, 2010	WISE	WISE	·	2.9 km	MPC · JPL
728646	2010 OH_{105}	—	July 29, 2010	WISE	WISE	·	2.1 km	MPC · JPL
728647	2010 OY_{105}	—	September 8, 2004	Palomar	NEAT	ARM	4.5 km	MPC · JPL
728648	2010 OV_{106}	—	July 29, 2010	WISE	WISE	·	2.8 km	MPC · JPL
728649	2010 OF_{107}	—	May 13, 2010	Mount Lemmon	Mount Lemmon Survey	SYL	3.9 km	MPC · JPL
728650	2010 OK_{108}	—	April 14, 2010	Kitt Peak	Spacewatch	·	2.7 km	MPC · JPL
728651	2010 OO_{108}	—	July 29, 2010	WISE	WISE	·	2.2 km	MPC · JPL
728652	2010 OR_{108}	—	November 3, 2005	Mount Lemmon	Mount Lemmon Survey	·	3.9 km	MPC · JPL
728653	2010 OY_{108}	—	July 29, 2010	WISE	WISE	·	3.5 km	MPC · JPL
728654	2010 OJ_{109}	—	May 4, 2010	Zelenchukskaya Stn	T. V. Krjačko, Satovski, B.	·	2.1 km	MPC · JPL
728655	2010 ON_{110}	—	July 29, 2010	WISE	WISE	TIR	2.7 km	MPC · JPL
728656	2010 ON_{111}	—	July 29, 2010	WISE	WISE	·	2.2 km	MPC · JPL
728657	2010 OQ_{113}	—	July 30, 2010	WISE	WISE	·	4.4 km	MPC · JPL
728658	2010 OU_{113}	—	July 30, 2010	WISE	WISE	·	2.1 km	MPC · JPL
728659	2010 OX_{113}	—	July 30, 2010	WISE	WISE	·	2.4 km	MPC · JPL
728660	2010 OS_{114}	—	July 30, 2010	WISE	WISE	·	1.6 km	MPC · JPL
728661	2010 ON_{115}	—	November 10, 2005	Kitt Peak	Spacewatch	·	3.4 km	MPC · JPL
728662	2010 OW_{116}	—	May 20, 2010	Mount Lemmon	Mount Lemmon Survey	·	2.1 km	MPC · JPL
728663	2010 ON_{117}	—	July 30, 2010	WISE	WISE	ARM	2.7 km	MPC · JPL
728664	2010 OK_{118}	—	November 4, 2005	Kitt Peak	Spacewatch	EMA	3.1 km	MPC · JPL
728665	2010 OE_{119}	—	February 16, 2004	Kitt Peak	Spacewatch	·	3.8 km	MPC · JPL
728666	2010 OT_{119}	—	April 9, 2010	Kitt Peak	Spacewatch	·	3.2 km	MPC · JPL
728667	2010 OL_{120}	—	July 31, 2010	WISE	WISE	·	2.5 km	MPC · JPL
728668	2010 OZ_{120}	—	July 31, 2010	WISE	WISE	·	3.5 km	MPC · JPL
728669	2010 OY_{122}	—	July 31, 2010	WISE	WISE	·	2.4 km	MPC · JPL
728670	2010 OG_{124}	—	July 31, 2010	WISE	WISE	·	3.1 km	MPC · JPL
728671	2010 OF_{143}	—	January 29, 2003	Apache Point	SDSS Collaboration	·	2.7 km	MPC · JPL
728672	2010 OQ_{146}	—	October 9, 2012	Haleakala	Pan-STARRS 1	·	2.5 km	MPC · JPL
728673	2010 OY_{149}	—	August 31, 2014	Haleakala	Pan-STARRS 1	·	1.3 km	MPC · JPL
728674	2010 PU_{1}	—	August 2, 2010	Socorro	LINEAR	·	1.5 km	MPC · JPL
728675	2010 PZ_{1}	—	June 18, 2010	Mount Lemmon	Mount Lemmon Survey	HNS	1.4 km	MPC · JPL
728676	2010 PR_{2}	—	August 1, 2010	WISE	WISE	·	3.1 km	MPC · JPL
728677	2010 PB_{3}	—	August 1, 2010	WISE	WISE	·	1.7 km	MPC · JPL
728678	2010 PQ_{3}	—	August 1, 2010	WISE	WISE	·	880 m	MPC · JPL
728679	2010 PQ_{5}	—	August 1, 2010	WISE	WISE	·	2.0 km	MPC · JPL
728680	2010 PZ_{5}	—	January 21, 2006	Mount Lemmon	Mount Lemmon Survey	THB	3.3 km	MPC · JPL
728681	2010 PD_{7}	—	May 5, 2010	Mount Lemmon	Mount Lemmon Survey	·	1.5 km	MPC · JPL
728682	2010 PD_{11}	—	April 8, 2010	Catalina	CSS	·	2.6 km	MPC · JPL
728683	2010 PK_{12}	—	August 2, 2010	WISE	WISE	·	2.3 km	MPC · JPL
728684	2010 PP_{12}	—	August 2, 2010	WISE	WISE	·	2.0 km	MPC · JPL
728685	2010 PA_{14}	—	January 27, 2003	Kitt Peak	Spacewatch	·	4.1 km	MPC · JPL
728686	2010 PS_{14}	—	November 17, 2007	Mount Lemmon	Mount Lemmon Survey	·	5.1 km	MPC · JPL
728687	2010 PU_{15}	—	May 14, 2010	Mount Lemmon	Mount Lemmon Survey	·	3.4 km	MPC · JPL
728688	2010 PN_{16}	—	August 3, 2010	WISE	WISE	NAE	3.6 km	MPC · JPL
728689	2010 PY_{16}	—	February 14, 2010	WISE	WISE	·	3.5 km	MPC · JPL
728690	2010 PD_{18}	—	May 11, 2010	Mount Lemmon	Mount Lemmon Survey	·	1.7 km	MPC · JPL
728691	2010 PY_{19}	—	March 16, 2009	Kitt Peak	Spacewatch	·	2.0 km	MPC · JPL
728692	2010 PH_{20}	—	August 4, 2010	WISE	WISE	·	3.8 km	MPC · JPL
728693	2010 PN_{25}	—	May 5, 2008	Catalina	CSS	EUP	3.5 km	MPC · JPL
728694	2010 PG_{27}	—	April 14, 2008	Mount Lemmon	Mount Lemmon Survey	·	2.9 km	MPC · JPL
728695	2010 PK_{27}	—	August 4, 2010	WISE	WISE	KON	2.1 km	MPC · JPL
728696	2010 PD_{28}	—	August 5, 2010	WISE	WISE	·	1.9 km	MPC · JPL
728697	2010 PB_{29}	—	August 5, 2010	WISE	WISE	·	3.5 km	MPC · JPL
728698	2010 PK_{29}	—	August 5, 2010	WISE	WISE	LIX	4.0 km	MPC · JPL
728699	2010 PR_{31}	—	August 5, 2010	WISE	WISE	·	1.7 km	MPC · JPL
728700	2010 PS_{31}	—	February 21, 2007	Kitt Peak	Spacewatch	·	2.8 km	MPC · JPL

== 728701–728800 ==
back to top

Designation			Discovery			Properties		Ref
Permanent	Provisional	Named after	Date	Site	Discoverer(s)	Category	Diam.	Ref
728701	2010 PC_{32}	—	August 5, 2010	WISE	WISE	·	4.3 km	MPC · JPL
728702	2010 PH_{33}	—	August 5, 2010	WISE	WISE	·	1.5 km	MPC · JPL
728703	2010 PR_{34}	—	April 12, 2004	Kitt Peak	Spacewatch	·	2.4 km	MPC · JPL
728704	2010 PZ_{34}	—	August 5, 2010	WISE	WISE	·	2.5 km	MPC · JPL
728705	2010 PL_{35}	—	August 26, 2001	Anderson Mesa	LONEOS	EUN	2.0 km	MPC · JPL
728706	2010 PO_{35}	—	August 5, 2010	WISE	WISE	·	2.4 km	MPC · JPL
728707	2010 PS_{35}	—	February 7, 2003	Palomar	NEAT	·	1.9 km	MPC · JPL
728708	2010 PV_{35}	—	April 25, 2007	Mount Lemmon	Mount Lemmon Survey	3:2	6.6 km	MPC · JPL
728709	2010 PL_{36}	—	May 15, 2010	Mount Lemmon	Mount Lemmon Survey	·	3.0 km	MPC · JPL
728710	2010 PS_{37}	—	August 6, 2010	WISE	WISE	NAE	2.8 km	MPC · JPL
728711	2010 PC_{38}	—	August 6, 2010	WISE	WISE	VER	3.3 km	MPC · JPL
728712	2010 PM_{38}	—	October 13, 1999	Apache Point	SDSS Collaboration	V	1.6 km	MPC · JPL
728713	2010 PW_{39}	—	September 7, 1999	Kitt Peak	Spacewatch	·	1.7 km	MPC · JPL
728714	2010 PK_{40}	—	August 6, 2010	WISE	WISE	·	2.4 km	MPC · JPL
728715	2010 PC_{41}	—	February 22, 2007	Kitt Peak	Spacewatch	·	4.3 km	MPC · JPL
728716	2010 PK_{41}	—	August 6, 2010	WISE	WISE	·	3.3 km	MPC · JPL
728717	2010 PW_{42}	—	August 6, 2010	WISE	WISE	·	3.0 km	MPC · JPL
728718	2010 PC_{43}	—	August 6, 2005	Palomar	NEAT	·	4.3 km	MPC · JPL
728719	2010 PJ_{46}	—	August 7, 2010	WISE	WISE	(194)	1.8 km	MPC · JPL
728720	2010 PL_{46}	—	August 7, 2010	WISE	WISE	·	5.8 km	MPC · JPL
728721	2010 PC_{47}	—	August 11, 2002	Palomar	NEAT	·	1.9 km	MPC · JPL
728722	2010 PV_{47}	—	August 7, 2010	WISE	WISE	·	2.0 km	MPC · JPL
728723	2010 PL_{48}	—	August 7, 2010	WISE	WISE	·	3.4 km	MPC · JPL
728724	2010 PO_{48}	—	August 7, 2010	WISE	WISE	·	3.4 km	MPC · JPL
728725	2010 PR_{48}	—	August 7, 2010	WISE	WISE	T_{j} (2.98) · EUP	3.0 km	MPC · JPL
728726	2010 PY_{48}	—	March 15, 2004	Palomar	NEAT	·	3.3 km	MPC · JPL
728727	2010 PB_{49}	—	August 7, 2010	WISE	WISE	·	3.3 km	MPC · JPL
728728	2010 PF_{52}	—	August 8, 2010	WISE	WISE	·	2.7 km	MPC · JPL
728729	2010 PH_{52}	—	August 8, 2010	WISE	WISE	·	2.3 km	MPC · JPL
728730	2010 PM_{54}	—	August 8, 2010	WISE	WISE	KON	2.2 km	MPC · JPL
728731	2010 PN_{54}	—	August 8, 2010	WISE	WISE	LIX	3.8 km	MPC · JPL
728732	2010 PR_{55}	—	August 8, 2010	WISE	WISE	·	4.6 km	MPC · JPL
728733	2010 PX_{55}	—	November 30, 2005	Mount Lemmon	Mount Lemmon Survey	·	2.4 km	MPC · JPL
728734	2010 PN_{58}	—	August 11, 2010	Kitt Peak	Spacewatch	L4	9.1 km	MPC · JPL
728735	2010 PB_{66}	—	March 31, 2009	Kitt Peak	Spacewatch	·	2.1 km	MPC · JPL
728736	2010 PV_{66}	—	August 8, 2010	WISE	WISE	·	3.0 km	MPC · JPL
728737	2010 PQ_{67}	—	August 8, 2010	WISE	WISE	·	3.4 km	MPC · JPL
728738	2010 PN_{69}	—	September 14, 2004	Palomar	NEAT	(895)	4.0 km	MPC · JPL
728739	2010 PP_{70}	—	November 30, 2005	Kitt Peak	Spacewatch	·	3.0 km	MPC · JPL
728740	2010 PB_{72}	—	August 11, 2010	WISE	WISE	·	3.3 km	MPC · JPL
728741	2010 PP_{72}	—	May 22, 2003	Kitt Peak	Spacewatch	·	4.5 km	MPC · JPL
728742	2010 PS_{81}	—	August 12, 2010	Kitt Peak	Spacewatch	·	1.6 km	MPC · JPL
728743	2010 PD_{88}	—	August 10, 2010	Kitt Peak	Spacewatch	KOR	1.2 km	MPC · JPL
728744	2010 PZ_{88}	—	May 26, 2014	Haleakala	Pan-STARRS 1	EUN	1.0 km	MPC · JPL
728745	2010 PW_{90}	—	August 14, 2010	Kitt Peak	Spacewatch	·	2.0 km	MPC · JPL
728746	2010 PM_{91}	—	August 14, 2010	Kitt Peak	Spacewatch	·	620 m	MPC · JPL
728747	2010 QJ_{4}	—	August 31, 2010	Marly	P. Kocher	·	780 m	MPC · JPL
728748	2010 RG_{1}	—	September 1, 2010	Mount Lemmon	Mount Lemmon Survey	·	1.8 km	MPC · JPL
728749	2010 RH_{5}	—	January 6, 2008	Zelenchukskaya	Station, Zelenchukskaya	·	590 m	MPC · JPL
728750	2010 RW_{6}	—	September 2, 2010	Mount Lemmon	Mount Lemmon Survey	·	1.6 km	MPC · JPL
728751	2010 RO_{9}	—	September 3, 2010	Mount Lemmon	Mount Lemmon Survey	·	1.6 km	MPC · JPL
728752	2010 RS_{12}	—	August 29, 1995	La Silla	C.-I. Lagerkvist	·	1.4 km	MPC · JPL
728753	2010 RD_{16}	—	September 2, 2010	Mount Lemmon	Mount Lemmon Survey	·	570 m	MPC · JPL
728754	2010 RX_{16}	—	September 2, 2010	Socorro	LINEAR	·	610 m	MPC · JPL
728755	2010 RB_{17}	—	May 26, 2010	WISE	WISE	·	2.1 km	MPC · JPL
728756	2010 RC_{18}	—	June 6, 2010	WISE	WISE	·	1.6 km	MPC · JPL
728757	2010 RM_{20}	—	August 14, 2010	Kitt Peak	Spacewatch	·	1.7 km	MPC · JPL
728758	2010 RV_{20}	—	February 26, 2008	Mount Lemmon	Mount Lemmon Survey	·	1.7 km	MPC · JPL
728759	2010 RV_{28}	—	September 4, 2010	Mount Lemmon	Mount Lemmon Survey	·	1.3 km	MPC · JPL
728760	2010 RC_{32}	—	September 1, 2010	Mount Lemmon	Mount Lemmon Survey	·	1.4 km	MPC · JPL
728761	2010 RC_{34}	—	May 7, 2010	WISE	WISE	·	1.8 km	MPC · JPL
728762	2010 RS_{37}	—	August 12, 2010	Kitt Peak	Spacewatch	·	540 m	MPC · JPL
728763	2010 RJ_{38}	—	May 8, 2013	Haleakala	Pan-STARRS 1	·	1.3 km	MPC · JPL
728764	2010 RE_{44}	—	January 18, 2007	Palomar	NEAT	·	3.7 km	MPC · JPL
728765	2010 RD_{46}	—	September 2, 2010	Mount Lemmon	Mount Lemmon Survey	HOF	2.0 km	MPC · JPL
728766	2010 RO_{58}	—	July 28, 2014	Haleakala	Pan-STARRS 1	·	1.0 km	MPC · JPL
728767	2010 RF_{64}	—	September 9, 2010	La Silla	D. L. Rabinowitz, M. E. Schwamb, S. Tourtellotte	cubewano (hot)	130 km	MPC · JPL
728768	2010 RS_{65}	—	June 20, 2010	Mount Lemmon	Mount Lemmon Survey	·	730 m	MPC · JPL
728769	2010 RY_{67}	—	October 7, 2007	Kitt Peak	Spacewatch	·	490 m	MPC · JPL
728770	2010 RV_{69}	—	August 29, 1995	La Silla	C.-I. Lagerkvist	·	1.4 km	MPC · JPL
728771	2010 RF_{72}	—	September 10, 2010	Mayhill	Lowe, A.	·	710 m	MPC · JPL
728772	2010 RY_{75}	—	June 15, 2010	WISE	WISE	·	2.7 km	MPC · JPL
728773	2010 RW_{76}	—	February 12, 2000	Apache Point	SDSS Collaboration	·	2.2 km	MPC · JPL
728774	2010 RZ_{79}	—	February 20, 2009	Kitt Peak	Spacewatch	NYS	1.4 km	MPC · JPL
728775	2010 RL_{81}	—	September 11, 2010	La Sagra	OAM	MAS	750 m	MPC · JPL
728776	2010 RK_{82}	—	June 19, 2006	Mount Lemmon	Mount Lemmon Survey	·	1.5 km	MPC · JPL
728777	2010 RM_{83}	—	September 1, 2010	Mount Lemmon	Mount Lemmon Survey	EOS	1.5 km	MPC · JPL
728778	2010 RL_{84}	—	August 12, 2010	Kitt Peak	Spacewatch	·	2.2 km	MPC · JPL
728779	2010 RM_{85}	—	September 2, 2010	Mount Lemmon	Mount Lemmon Survey	AGN	840 m	MPC · JPL
728780	2010 RQ_{85}	—	September 2, 2010	Mount Lemmon	Mount Lemmon Survey	·	1.5 km	MPC · JPL
728781	2010 RU_{98}	—	September 10, 2010	Kitt Peak	Spacewatch	(2076)	660 m	MPC · JPL
728782	2010 RZ_{115}	—	July 26, 2005	Palomar	NEAT	·	1.9 km	MPC · JPL
728783	2010 RA_{119}	—	September 11, 2010	Kitt Peak	Spacewatch	·	1.4 km	MPC · JPL
728784	2010 RE_{124}	—	September 1, 2010	Mount Lemmon	Mount Lemmon Survey	·	1.4 km	MPC · JPL
728785	2010 RG_{129}	—	January 9, 2007	Mount Lemmon	Mount Lemmon Survey	·	2.7 km	MPC · JPL
728786	2010 RA_{133}	—	September 15, 2010	Mount Lemmon	Mount Lemmon Survey	·	1.9 km	MPC · JPL
728787	2010 RF_{133}	—	September 15, 2010	Mount Lemmon	Mount Lemmon Survey	·	1.8 km	MPC · JPL
728788	2010 RJ_{135}	—	October 15, 2007	Kitt Peak	Spacewatch	·	570 m	MPC · JPL
728789	2010 RY_{135}	—	September 10, 2010	Catalina	CSS	·	3.3 km	MPC · JPL
728790	2010 RS_{138}	—	August 10, 2010	Kitt Peak	Spacewatch	·	510 m	MPC · JPL
728791	2010 RJ_{157}	—	September 3, 2010	Piszkés-tető	K. Sárneczky, Z. Kuli	·	1.5 km	MPC · JPL
728792	2010 RP_{157}	—	September 19, 2010	Kitt Peak	Spacewatch	·	1.6 km	MPC · JPL
728793	2010 RM_{158}	—	October 12, 2006	Kitt Peak	Spacewatch	·	1.9 km	MPC · JPL
728794	2010 RL_{162}	—	September 4, 2010	Mount Lemmon	Mount Lemmon Survey	(43176)	2.5 km	MPC · JPL
728795	2010 RF_{168}	—	September 21, 2003	Kitt Peak	Spacewatch	·	640 m	MPC · JPL
728796	2010 RT_{176}	—	September 10, 2010	Kitt Peak	Spacewatch	·	3.4 km	MPC · JPL
728797	2010 RV_{183}	—	July 12, 2010	WISE	WISE	·	2.8 km	MPC · JPL
728798	2010 RJ_{184}	—	January 21, 2012	Haleakala	Pan-STARRS 1	·	3.1 km	MPC · JPL
728799	2010 RZ_{186}	—	March 11, 2008	Mount Lemmon	Mount Lemmon Survey	KOR	1.6 km	MPC · JPL
728800	2010 RM_{191}	—	May 29, 2010	WISE	WISE	·	2.5 km	MPC · JPL

== 728801–728900 ==
back to top

Designation			Discovery			Properties		Ref
Permanent	Provisional	Named after	Date	Site	Discoverer(s)	Category	Diam.	Ref
728801	2010 RY_{192}	—	March 18, 2013	Mount Lemmon	Mount Lemmon Survey	·	830 m	MPC · JPL
728802	2010 RC_{193}	—	September 5, 2010	Mount Lemmon	Mount Lemmon Survey	·	1.0 km	MPC · JPL
728803	2010 RF_{193}	—	April 15, 2004	Siding Spring	SSS	·	1.9 km	MPC · JPL
728804	2010 RW_{193}	—	October 3, 1999	Kitt Peak	Spacewatch	·	2.2 km	MPC · JPL
728805	2010 RQ_{194}	—	July 23, 2010	WISE	WISE	·	2.5 km	MPC · JPL
728806	2010 RR_{194}	—	September 9, 2015	Haleakala	Pan-STARRS 1	·	1.3 km	MPC · JPL
728807	2010 RQ_{196}	—	October 26, 2011	Haleakala	Pan-STARRS 1	ADE	1.6 km	MPC · JPL
728808	2010 RT_{196}	—	June 14, 2010	WISE	WISE	·	1.7 km	MPC · JPL
728809	2010 RZ_{197}	—	June 7, 2014	Haleakala	Pan-STARRS 1	GEF	1.1 km	MPC · JPL
728810	2010 RM_{199}	—	January 10, 2013	Haleakala	Pan-STARRS 1	WAT	1.3 km	MPC · JPL
728811	2010 RZ_{201}	—	June 14, 2010	WISE	WISE	·	1.5 km	MPC · JPL
728812	2010 RA_{202}	—	March 15, 2013	Kitt Peak	Spacewatch	·	1.6 km	MPC · JPL
728813	2010 RY_{202}	—	September 12, 2016	Haleakala	Pan-STARRS 1	·	2.5 km	MPC · JPL
728814	2010 RV_{212}	—	September 2, 2010	Mount Lemmon	Mount Lemmon Survey	·	580 m	MPC · JPL
728815	2010 RW_{218}	—	September 2, 2010	Mount Lemmon	Mount Lemmon Survey	·	1.9 km	MPC · JPL
728816	2010 SH_{6}	—	September 16, 2010	Mount Lemmon	Mount Lemmon Survey	·	1.0 km	MPC · JPL
728817	2010 SE_{8}	—	September 17, 2010	Socorro	LINEAR	H	580 m	MPC · JPL
728818	2010 SH_{8}	—	September 17, 2010	Mount Lemmon	Mount Lemmon Survey	·	2.2 km	MPC · JPL
728819	2010 SM_{16}	—	September 29, 2010	Mount Lemmon	Mount Lemmon Survey	·	1.0 km	MPC · JPL
728820	2010 SN_{16}	—	September 18, 2010	Mount Lemmon	Mount Lemmon Survey	·	570 m	MPC · JPL
728821	2010 SU_{20}	—	September 28, 2010	Kitt Peak	Spacewatch	·	1.3 km	MPC · JPL
728822	2010 SM_{28}	—	September 30, 2005	Mount Lemmon	Mount Lemmon Survey	KOR	1.1 km	MPC · JPL
728823	2010 SO_{29}	—	August 29, 1995	La Silla	C.-I. Lagerkvist	MAS	900 m	MPC · JPL
728824	2010 SK_{33}	—	February 6, 2002	Kitt Peak	Deep Ecliptic Survey	HYG	2.7 km	MPC · JPL
728825	2010 SS_{34}	—	September 30, 2010	Mount Lemmon	Mount Lemmon Survey	·	1.5 km	MPC · JPL
728826 Szerbantal	2010 SZ_{35}	Szerbantal	September 30, 2010	Piszkés-tető	S. Kürti, K. Sárneczky	·	2.8 km	MPC · JPL
728827	2010 SQ_{43}	—	February 27, 2012	Kitt Peak	Spacewatch	·	1.2 km	MPC · JPL
728828	2010 SA_{45}	—	October 20, 2006	Mount Lemmon	Mount Lemmon Survey	·	1.8 km	MPC · JPL
728829	2010 SB_{45}	—	September 29, 2010	Mount Lemmon	Mount Lemmon Survey	·	1.5 km	MPC · JPL
728830	2010 SF_{46}	—	June 22, 2010	WISE	WISE	·	2.4 km	MPC · JPL
728831	2010 SD_{47}	—	April 26, 2003	Campo Imperatore	CINEOS	·	3.9 km	MPC · JPL
728832	2010 SH_{47}	—	September 18, 2010	Mount Lemmon	Mount Lemmon Survey	·	1.3 km	MPC · JPL
728833	2010 SE_{52}	—	September 29, 2010	Mount Lemmon	Mount Lemmon Survey	·	1.6 km	MPC · JPL
728834	2010 SO_{52}	—	January 8, 2016	Haleakala	Pan-STARRS 1	·	760 m	MPC · JPL
728835	2010 SR_{53}	—	September 29, 2010	Mount Lemmon	Mount Lemmon Survey	·	1.6 km	MPC · JPL
728836	2010 SU_{53}	—	September 9, 2015	Haleakala	Pan-STARRS 1	HOF	2.3 km	MPC · JPL
728837	2010 SN_{57}	—	March 19, 2013	Haleakala	Pan-STARRS 1	EOS	1.6 km	MPC · JPL
728838	2010 SQ_{60}	—	July 1, 2010	WISE	WISE	·	2.6 km	MPC · JPL
728839	2010 SV_{63}	—	September 30, 2010	Mount Lemmon	Mount Lemmon Survey	V	410 m	MPC · JPL
728840	2010 TH	—	October 2, 2010	La Silla	M. E. Schwamb, D. L. Rabinowitz	centaur	70 km	MPC · JPL
728841	2010 TT_{12}	—	October 3, 2010	Kitt Peak	Spacewatch	·	660 m	MPC · JPL
728842	2010 TV_{20}	—	October 1, 2010	Kitt Peak	Spacewatch	·	1.3 km	MPC · JPL
728843	2010 TJ_{21}	—	July 14, 2010	WISE	WISE	·	2.6 km	MPC · JPL
728844	2010 TU_{29}	—	October 23, 2003	Kitt Peak	Spacewatch	NYS	850 m	MPC · JPL
728845	2010 TN_{41}	—	November 16, 2006	Mount Lemmon	Mount Lemmon Survey	KON	1.8 km	MPC · JPL
728846	2010 TO_{43}	—	July 16, 2004	Cerro Tololo	Deep Ecliptic Survey	·	2.4 km	MPC · JPL
728847	2010 TF_{45}	—	October 3, 2010	Kitt Peak	Spacewatch	KOR	990 m	MPC · JPL
728848	2010 TJ_{50}	—	August 28, 1995	La Silla	C.-I. Lagerkvist	·	1.4 km	MPC · JPL
728849	2010 TW_{50}	—	August 23, 2001	Anderson Mesa	LONEOS	·	1.3 km	MPC · JPL
728850	2010 TK_{52}	—	October 8, 2010	Kitt Peak	Spacewatch	EOS	1.3 km	MPC · JPL
728851	2010 TH_{68}	—	October 8, 2010	Kitt Peak	Spacewatch	·	660 m	MPC · JPL
728852	2010 TX_{71}	—	October 8, 2010	Kitt Peak	Spacewatch	·	1.2 km	MPC · JPL
728853	2010 TC_{78}	—	October 8, 2010	Kitt Peak	Spacewatch	·	1.3 km	MPC · JPL
728854	2010 TM_{80}	—	October 8, 2010	Kitt Peak	Spacewatch	·	1.2 km	MPC · JPL
728855	2010 TZ_{83}	—	October 1, 2010	Kitt Peak	Spacewatch	·	1.8 km	MPC · JPL
728856	2010 TX_{84}	—	September 19, 2010	Kitt Peak	Spacewatch	KOR	1.2 km	MPC · JPL
728857	2010 TR_{85}	—	September 15, 2010	Kitt Peak	Spacewatch	·	1.5 km	MPC · JPL
728858	2010 TQ_{89}	—	October 1, 2010	Mount Lemmon	Mount Lemmon Survey	·	850 m	MPC · JPL
728859	2010 TU_{94}	—	September 16, 2010	Kitt Peak	Spacewatch	·	1.2 km	MPC · JPL
728860	2010 TX_{96}	—	October 1, 2010	Mount Lemmon	Mount Lemmon Survey	(16286)	1.5 km	MPC · JPL
728861	2010 TW_{99}	—	October 1, 2010	Kitt Peak	Spacewatch	EOS	1.5 km	MPC · JPL
728862	2010 TZ_{109}	—	September 30, 2010	Mount Lemmon	Mount Lemmon Survey	·	1.4 km	MPC · JPL
728863	2010 TD_{110}	—	October 10, 2001	Palomar	NEAT	·	2.1 km	MPC · JPL
728864	2010 TQ_{110}	—	July 8, 2010	WISE	WISE	HOF	2.5 km	MPC · JPL
728865	2010 TJ_{112}	—	July 21, 2010	WISE	WISE	DOR	2.6 km	MPC · JPL
728866	2010 TG_{125}	—	October 10, 2010	Mount Lemmon	Mount Lemmon Survey	AGN	1.1 km	MPC · JPL
728867	2010 TD_{127}	—	October 10, 2010	Mount Lemmon	Mount Lemmon Survey	·	1.2 km	MPC · JPL
728868	2010 TJ_{129}	—	September 10, 2010	Front Royal	Skillman, D.	·	770 m	MPC · JPL
728869	2010 TY_{130}	—	October 11, 2010	Mount Lemmon	Mount Lemmon Survey	·	1.6 km	MPC · JPL
728870	2010 TP_{139}	—	February 29, 2008	Kitt Peak	Spacewatch	·	1.2 km	MPC · JPL
728871	2010 TX_{152}	—	October 1, 2010	Mount Lemmon	Mount Lemmon Survey	·	1.5 km	MPC · JPL
728872	2010 TH_{154}	—	September 18, 2010	Mount Lemmon	Mount Lemmon Survey	·	760 m	MPC · JPL
728873	2010 TS_{154}	—	October 16, 1999	Apache Point	SDSS	·	2.3 km	MPC · JPL
728874	2010 TA_{157}	—	September 19, 2010	Kitt Peak	Spacewatch	V	470 m	MPC · JPL
728875	2010 TU_{162}	—	September 17, 2010	Mount Lemmon	Mount Lemmon Survey	·	1.9 km	MPC · JPL
728876	2010 TA_{164}	—	August 28, 1995	La Silla	C.-I. Lagerkvist	·	990 m	MPC · JPL
728877	2010 TP_{165}	—	July 22, 2010	WISE	WISE	·	1.6 km	MPC · JPL
728878	2010 TW_{176}	—	July 8, 2003	Palomar	NEAT	·	1.0 km	MPC · JPL
728879	2010 TQ_{194}	—	October 13, 2010	Mount Lemmon	Mount Lemmon Survey	·	1.4 km	MPC · JPL
728880	2010 TH_{195}	—	October 9, 2010	Mount Lemmon	Mount Lemmon Survey	·	880 m	MPC · JPL
728881	2010 TY_{196}	—	July 27, 2010	WISE	WISE	NAE	2.2 km	MPC · JPL
728882	2010 TL_{197}	—	October 14, 2010	Bergisch Gladbach	W. Bickel	·	780 m	MPC · JPL
728883	2010 TH_{198}	—	July 15, 2010	WISE	WISE	·	2.4 km	MPC · JPL
728884	2010 TC_{203}	—	October 8, 2010	Kitt Peak	Spacewatch	·	1.9 km	MPC · JPL
728885	2010 TP_{203}	—	February 11, 2012	Mount Lemmon	Mount Lemmon Survey	·	740 m	MPC · JPL
728886	2010 TJ_{204}	—	October 3, 2010	Kitt Peak	Spacewatch	·	630 m	MPC · JPL
728887	2010 TM_{211}	—	October 13, 2010	Mount Lemmon	Mount Lemmon Survey	·	920 m	MPC · JPL
728888	2010 TO_{211}	—	October 13, 2010	Mount Lemmon	Mount Lemmon Survey	WIT	770 m	MPC · JPL
728889	2010 TH_{214}	—	September 25, 2006	Kitt Peak	Spacewatch	V	530 m	MPC · JPL
728890	2010 TR_{215}	—	October 14, 2010	Mount Lemmon	Mount Lemmon Survey	KOR	1.0 km	MPC · JPL
728891	2010 TZ_{215}	—	October 2, 2010	Kitt Peak	Spacewatch	KOR	1.1 km	MPC · JPL
728892	2010 TC_{222}	—	October 13, 2010	Mount Lemmon	Mount Lemmon Survey	(1298)	2.1 km	MPC · JPL
728893	2010 TZ_{222}	—	October 11, 2010	Mount Lemmon	Mount Lemmon Survey	L4	5.9 km	MPC · JPL
728894	2010 TL_{224}	—	October 2, 2010	Mount Lemmon	Mount Lemmon Survey	·	2.8 km	MPC · JPL
728895	2010 UN_{1}	—	September 18, 2010	Mount Lemmon	Mount Lemmon Survey	·	660 m	MPC · JPL
728896	2010 UZ_{3}	—	November 12, 2005	Kitt Peak	Spacewatch	EOS	1.6 km	MPC · JPL
728897	2010 UN_{6}	—	January 18, 2010	WISE	WISE	L4	9.5 km	MPC · JPL
728898	2010 UO_{8}	—	January 30, 2008	Mount Lemmon	Mount Lemmon Survey	·	1.8 km	MPC · JPL
728899	2010 UW_{11}	—	March 31, 2003	Palomar	NEAT	·	1.4 km	MPC · JPL
728900	2010 UX_{12}	—	October 20, 2006	Mount Lemmon	Mount Lemmon Survey	·	1.6 km	MPC · JPL

== 728901–729000 ==
back to top

Designation			Discovery			Properties		Ref
Permanent	Provisional	Named after	Date	Site	Discoverer(s)	Category	Diam.	Ref
728901	2010 UD_{30}	—	April 8, 2008	Kitt Peak	Spacewatch	·	3.4 km	MPC · JPL
728902	2010 UR_{37}	—	October 29, 2010	Piszkés-tető	K. Sárneczky, S. Kürti	·	1.8 km	MPC · JPL
728903	2010 UQ_{49}	—	October 31, 2010	Mount Lemmon	Mount Lemmon Survey	·	1.1 km	MPC · JPL
728904	2010 UY_{50}	—	August 20, 2004	Catalina	CSS	·	3.8 km	MPC · JPL
728905	2010 UC_{56}	—	October 29, 2010	Kitt Peak	Spacewatch	·	3.1 km	MPC · JPL
728906	2010 UL_{59}	—	October 17, 2003	Apache Point	SDSS Collaboration	·	620 m	MPC · JPL
728907	2010 UW_{61}	—	July 23, 2010	WISE	WISE	·	2.9 km	MPC · JPL
728908	2010 UF_{62}	—	October 30, 2010	Mount Lemmon	Mount Lemmon Survey	·	1.0 km	MPC · JPL
728909	2010 UE_{68}	—	October 11, 2010	Mount Lemmon	Mount Lemmon Survey	·	1.3 km	MPC · JPL
728910	2010 UT_{72}	—	October 11, 2010	Catalina	CSS	(5)	1.4 km	MPC · JPL
728911	2010 UC_{77}	—	January 22, 2010	WISE	WISE	L4	12 km	MPC · JPL
728912	2010 UN_{88}	—	October 8, 2001	Palomar	NEAT	MAR	1.3 km	MPC · JPL
728913	2010 UD_{99}	—	September 12, 2001	Kitt Peak	Deep Ecliptic Survey	·	1.3 km	MPC · JPL
728914	2010 UG_{101}	—	January 14, 2010	WISE	WISE	L4	17 km	MPC · JPL
728915	2010 UE_{104}	—	November 2, 2010	Mount Lemmon	Mount Lemmon Survey	AGN	890 m	MPC · JPL
728916	2010 UT_{104}	—	December 14, 2003	Kitt Peak	Spacewatch	NYS	820 m	MPC · JPL
728917	2010 UD_{109}	—	October 17, 2010	Mount Lemmon	Mount Lemmon Survey	·	1.1 km	MPC · JPL
728918	2010 US_{111}	—	November 3, 2010	Mount Lemmon	Mount Lemmon Survey	V	570 m	MPC · JPL
728919	2010 UH_{113}	—	June 22, 2014	Mount Lemmon	Mount Lemmon Survey	·	1.5 km	MPC · JPL
728920	2010 UW_{115}	—	July 6, 2014	Haleakala	Pan-STARRS 1	·	1.4 km	MPC · JPL
728921	2010 UQ_{117}	—	October 31, 2010	Mount Lemmon	Mount Lemmon Survey	(5)	1 km	MPC · JPL
728922	2010 UY_{117}	—	October 10, 2015	Haleakala	Pan-STARRS 1	KOR	960 m	MPC · JPL
728923	2010 UM_{119}	—	June 4, 2014	Haleakala	Pan-STARRS 1	·	1.4 km	MPC · JPL
728924	2010 UF_{120}	—	March 26, 2008	Mount Lemmon	Mount Lemmon Survey	·	1.4 km	MPC · JPL
728925	2010 UW_{121}	—	October 19, 2010	Mount Lemmon	Mount Lemmon Survey	V	560 m	MPC · JPL
728926	2010 UZ_{123}	—	October 29, 2010	Mount Lemmon	Mount Lemmon Survey	·	760 m	MPC · JPL
728927	2010 VR_{7}	—	November 1, 2010	Mount Lemmon	Mount Lemmon Survey	·	1.2 km	MPC · JPL
728928	2010 VU_{9}	—	October 19, 2003	Apache Point	SDSS Collaboration	·	3.7 km	MPC · JPL
728929	2010 VV_{22}	—	October 1, 2005	Mount Lemmon	Mount Lemmon Survey	KOR	960 m	MPC · JPL
728930	2010 VX_{23}	—	January 15, 2010	WISE	WISE	L4 · 006	12 km	MPC · JPL
728931	2010 VW_{27}	—	November 1, 2010	Piszkés-tető	K. Sárneczky, Z. Kuli	·	1.7 km	MPC · JPL
728932	2010 VJ_{28}	—	July 29, 2010	WISE	WISE	·	3.4 km	MPC · JPL
728933	2010 VU_{32}	—	May 23, 2001	Cerro Tololo	Deep Ecliptic Survey	·	1.8 km	MPC · JPL
728934	2010 VV_{37}	—	August 11, 2010	WISE	WISE	·	3.6 km	MPC · JPL
728935	2010 VJ_{38}	—	October 14, 2001	Apache Point	SDSS Collaboration	·	1.9 km	MPC · JPL
728936	2010 VR_{42}	—	July 22, 2010	WISE	WISE	·	2.5 km	MPC · JPL
728937	2010 VU_{42}	—	December 31, 2007	Mount Lemmon	Mount Lemmon Survey	·	760 m	MPC · JPL
728938	2010 VX_{43}	—	July 26, 2010	WISE	WISE	·	3.0 km	MPC · JPL
728939	2010 VS_{58}	—	October 28, 2005	Mount Lemmon	Mount Lemmon Survey	·	2.9 km	MPC · JPL
728940	2010 VO_{68}	—	October 19, 2006	Catalina	CSS	·	1.7 km	MPC · JPL
728941	2010 VO_{72}	—	March 10, 2007	Mount Lemmon	Mount Lemmon Survey	·	3.7 km	MPC · JPL
728942	2010 VU_{82}	—	November 10, 2009	Catalina	CSS	L4	15 km	MPC · JPL
728943	2010 VP_{87}	—	October 11, 1999	Kitt Peak	Spacewatch	·	890 m	MPC · JPL
728944	2010 VA_{90}	—	September 16, 2006	Kitt Peak	Spacewatch	MAS	580 m	MPC · JPL
728945	2010 VP_{93}	—	September 11, 2010	Mount Lemmon	Mount Lemmon Survey	·	1.5 km	MPC · JPL
728946	2010 VW_{101}	—	July 16, 2010	WISE	WISE	NYS	1.0 km	MPC · JPL
728947	2010 VA_{107}	—	June 12, 2008	Kitt Peak	Spacewatch	·	3.9 km	MPC · JPL
728948	2010 VB_{109}	—	November 6, 2010	Mount Lemmon	Mount Lemmon Survey	·	1.5 km	MPC · JPL
728949	2010 VG_{117}	—	November 8, 2010	Kitt Peak	Spacewatch	·	1.4 km	MPC · JPL
728950	2010 VD_{121}	—	October 22, 2005	Kitt Peak	Spacewatch	·	1.3 km	MPC · JPL
728951	2010 VC_{127}	—	January 10, 2003	Palomar	NEAT	(194) · slow	1.7 km	MPC · JPL
728952	2010 VZ_{135}	—	November 10, 2010	Mount Lemmon	Mount Lemmon Survey	·	850 m	MPC · JPL
728953	2010 VE_{142}	—	September 11, 2010	Mount Lemmon	Mount Lemmon Survey	·	850 m	MPC · JPL
728954	2010 VW_{148}	—	November 6, 2010	Mount Lemmon	Mount Lemmon Survey	·	1.6 km	MPC · JPL
728955	2010 VN_{155}	—	November 7, 2010	Mount Lemmon	Mount Lemmon Survey	·	510 m	MPC · JPL
728956	2010 VQ_{166}	—	December 14, 2004	Kitt Peak	Spacewatch	·	3.9 km	MPC · JPL
728957	2010 VU_{166}	—	November 10, 2010	Mount Lemmon	Mount Lemmon Survey	L4	6.3 km	MPC · JPL
728958	2010 VZ_{166}	—	November 9, 2010	Catalina	CSS	·	1.5 km	MPC · JPL
728959	2010 VA_{167}	—	November 10, 2010	Mount Lemmon	Mount Lemmon Survey	L4	5.7 km	MPC · JPL
728960	2010 VQ_{169}	—	October 27, 2009	Sandlot	G. Hug	L4	12 km	MPC · JPL
728961	2010 VC_{174}	—	October 13, 1999	Apache Point	SDSS Collaboration	·	960 m	MPC · JPL
728962	2010 VY_{176}	—	July 29, 2001	Palomar	NEAT	·	2.1 km	MPC · JPL
728963	2010 VE_{177}	—	October 29, 2010	Kitt Peak	Spacewatch	L4	6.2 km	MPC · JPL
728964	2010 VC_{178}	—	November 11, 2010	Mount Lemmon	Mount Lemmon Survey	·	3.1 km	MPC · JPL
728965	2010 VV_{182}	—	August 27, 2006	Kitt Peak	Spacewatch	MAS	520 m	MPC · JPL
728966	2010 VG_{210}	—	December 5, 2010	Mount Lemmon	Mount Lemmon Survey	EOS	2.2 km	MPC · JPL
728967	2010 VC_{212}	—	October 14, 2001	Apache Point	SDSS Collaboration	·	1.2 km	MPC · JPL
728968	2010 VQ_{212}	—	November 3, 2010	Mount Lemmon	Mount Lemmon Survey	·	1.1 km	MPC · JPL
728969	2010 VE_{213}	—	August 23, 2004	Kitt Peak	Spacewatch	·	1.9 km	MPC · JPL
728970	2010 VW_{213}	—	November 11, 2010	Mount Lemmon	Mount Lemmon Survey	·	1.4 km	MPC · JPL
728971	2010 VF_{214}	—	October 24, 2003	Kitt Peak	Spacewatch	·	810 m	MPC · JPL
728972	2010 VZ_{224}	—	December 23, 2012	Haleakala	Pan-STARRS 1	L4 · ERY	6.9 km	MPC · JPL
728973	2010 VX_{226}	—	November 2, 2010	Mount Lemmon	Mount Lemmon Survey	·	2.3 km	MPC · JPL
728974	2010 VF_{229}	—	October 13, 2010	Mount Lemmon	Mount Lemmon Survey	·	740 m	MPC · JPL
728975	2010 VS_{230}	—	January 13, 2010	WISE	WISE	·	2.7 km	MPC · JPL
728976	2010 VT_{232}	—	July 12, 2013	Haleakala	Pan-STARRS 1	·	580 m	MPC · JPL
728977	2010 VF_{233}	—	November 7, 2010	Mount Lemmon	Mount Lemmon Survey	EOS	1.6 km	MPC · JPL
728978	2010 VJ_{235}	—	January 12, 2010	WISE	WISE	EOS	2.0 km	MPC · JPL
728979	2010 VN_{235}	—	August 26, 2014	Haleakala	Pan-STARRS 1	·	1.7 km	MPC · JPL
728980	2010 VU_{238}	—	July 29, 2010	WISE	WISE	·	1.4 km	MPC · JPL
728981	2010 VU_{239}	—	April 16, 2017	Mount Lemmon	Mount Lemmon Survey	BRG	1.2 km	MPC · JPL
728982	2010 VZ_{239}	—	November 14, 2010	Kitt Peak	Spacewatch	·	580 m	MPC · JPL
728983	2010 VV_{242}	—	June 7, 2013	Haleakala	Pan-STARRS 1	·	1.8 km	MPC · JPL
728984	2010 VD_{249}	—	November 13, 2010	Mount Lemmon	Mount Lemmon Survey	·	920 m	MPC · JPL
728985	2010 VF_{252}	—	November 8, 2010	Kitt Peak	Spacewatch	·	1.6 km	MPC · JPL
728986	2010 VH_{266}	—	November 10, 2010	Mount Lemmon	Mount Lemmon Survey	·	3.2 km	MPC · JPL
728987	2010 VM_{271}	—	November 2, 2010	Mount Lemmon	Mount Lemmon Survey	L4	6.7 km	MPC · JPL
728988	2010 VR_{276}	—	November 2, 2010	Mount Lemmon	Mount Lemmon Survey	EUN	770 m	MPC · JPL
728989	2010 VG_{277}	—	November 13, 2010	Mount Lemmon	Mount Lemmon Survey	·	2.3 km	MPC · JPL
728990	2010 VE_{280}	—	October 14, 2009	Mount Lemmon	Mount Lemmon Survey	L4	5.1 km	MPC · JPL
728991	2010 WZ_{11}	—	November 16, 2010	Mount Lemmon	Mount Lemmon Survey	EOS	1.6 km	MPC · JPL
728992	2010 WG_{23}	—	November 27, 2010	Mount Lemmon	Mount Lemmon Survey	·	1.0 km	MPC · JPL
728993	2010 WX_{23}	—	November 27, 2010	Mount Lemmon	Mount Lemmon Survey	L4	5.7 km	MPC · JPL
728994	2010 WQ_{25}	—	November 14, 2010	Kitt Peak	Spacewatch	·	570 m	MPC · JPL
728995	2010 WA_{32}	—	September 29, 2005	Kitt Peak	Spacewatch	AGN	890 m	MPC · JPL
728996	2010 WW_{37}	—	November 27, 2010	Mount Lemmon	Mount Lemmon Survey	L4	6.7 km	MPC · JPL
728997	2010 WB_{40}	—	September 13, 2005	Kitt Peak	Spacewatch	AGN	870 m	MPC · JPL
728998	2010 WG_{64}	—	November 6, 2010	Sandlot	G. Hug	·	740 m	MPC · JPL
728999	2010 WX_{64}	—	November 7, 2010	Kitt Peak	Spacewatch	·	840 m	MPC · JPL
729000	2010 WH_{74}	—	January 4, 2006	Mount Lemmon	Mount Lemmon Survey	·	2.8 km	MPC · JPL

back to top

== Meaning of names ==
As minor planet discoveries are confirmed, they are given a permanent number by the IAU's Minor Planet Center (MPC), and the discoverers can then submit names for them, following the IAU's naming conventions. The list below concerns those minor planets in the specified number-range that have received names, and explains the meanings of those names.

Official naming citations of newly named small Solar System bodies are approved and published in a bulletin by IAU's Working Group for Small Bodies Nomenclature (WGSBN). Before May 2021, citations were published in MPC's Minor Planet Circulars for many decades. Recent citations can also be found on the JPL Small-Body Database (SBDB). Until his death in 2016, German astronomer Lutz D. Schmadel compiled these citations into the Dictionary of Minor Planet Names (DMP) and regularly updated the collection.

Based on Paul Herget's The Names of the Minor Planets, Schmadel also researched the unclear origin of numerous asteroids, most of which had been named prior to World War II. This article incorporates text from this source, which is in the public domain: SBDB New namings may only be added to this list below after official publication as the preannouncement of names is condemned. The WGSBN publishes a comprehensive guideline for the naming rules of non-cometary small Solar System bodies.

Named minor planet	Provisional	This minor planet was named for...	Ref · Catalog
728826 Szerbantal	2010 SZ_{35}	Antal Szerb, Hungarian writer, literary historian, translator, and a Professor of Literature at the University of Szeged.	IAU · 728826
