= List of trans-Neptunian objects =

Comprehensive list of objects beyond Neptune

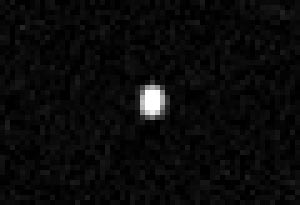

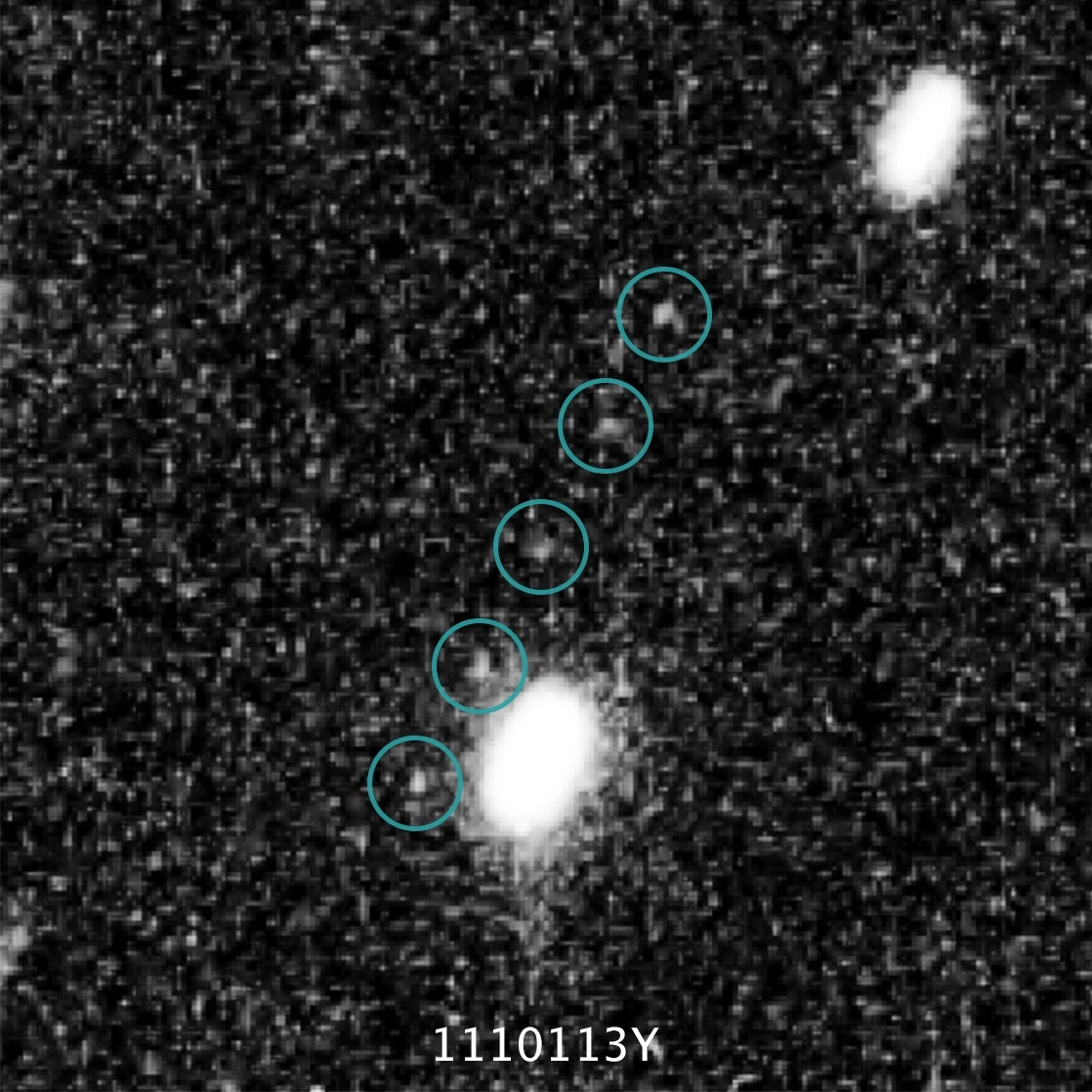
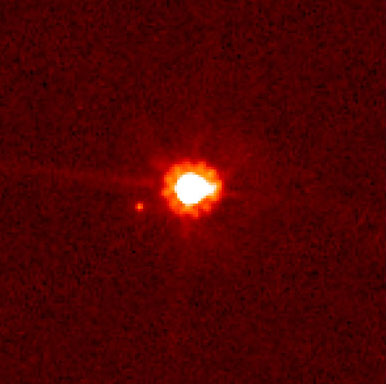

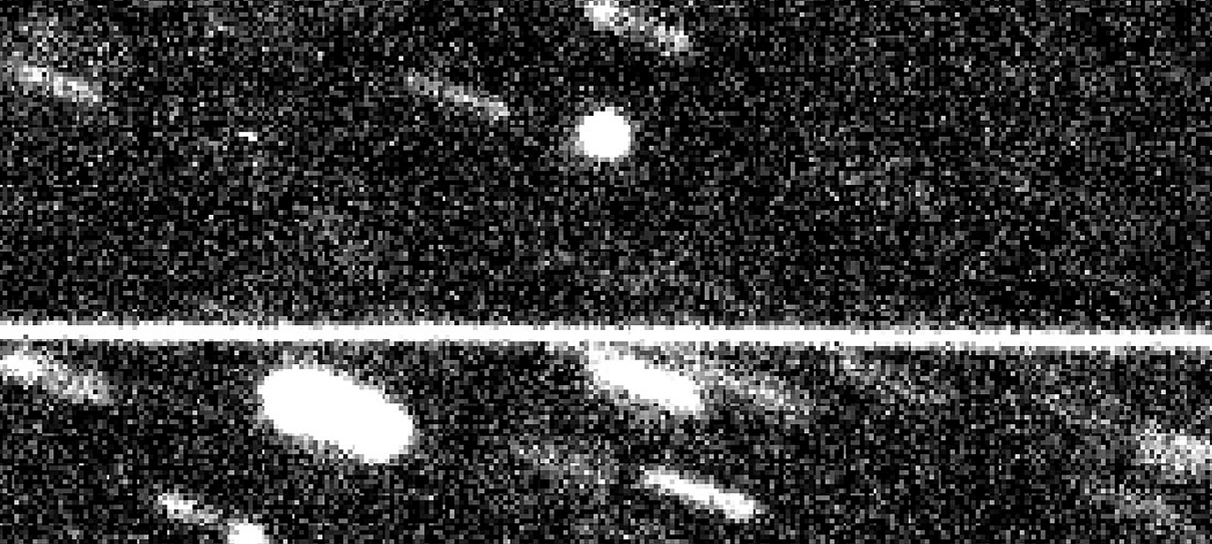
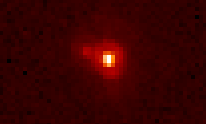

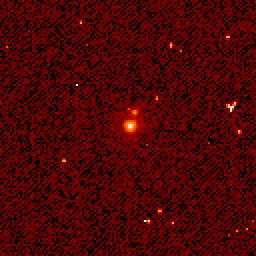
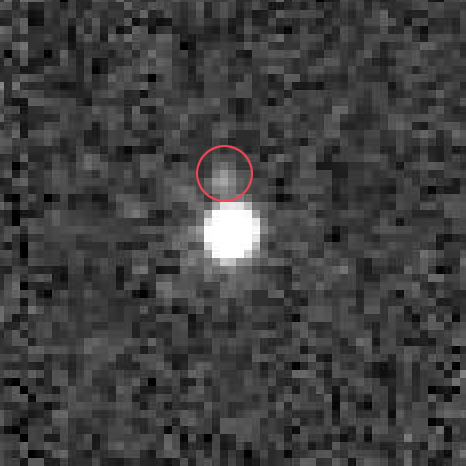
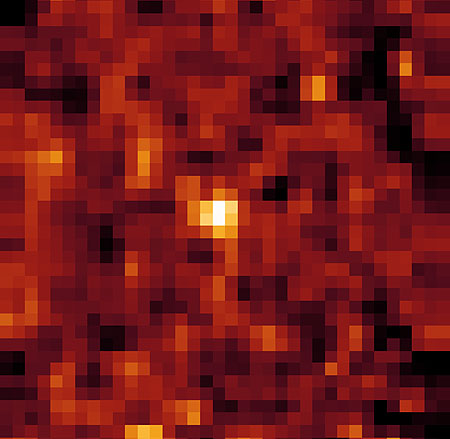

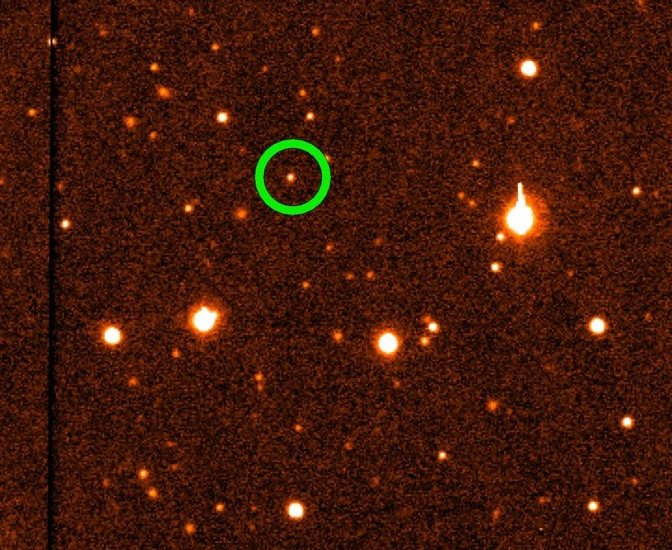
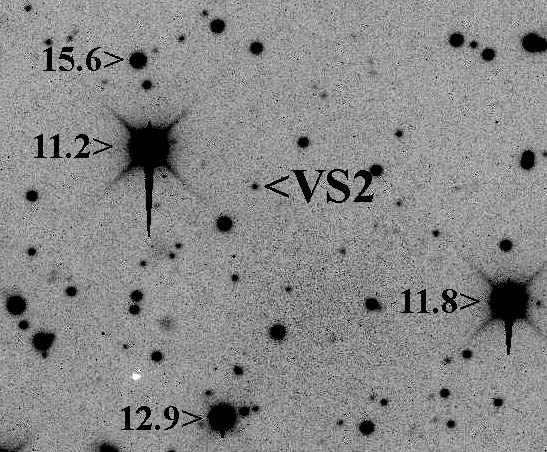

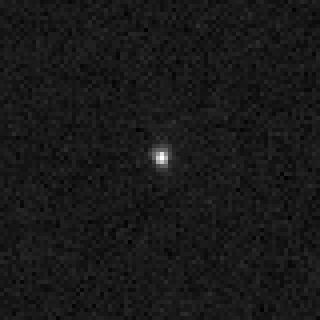
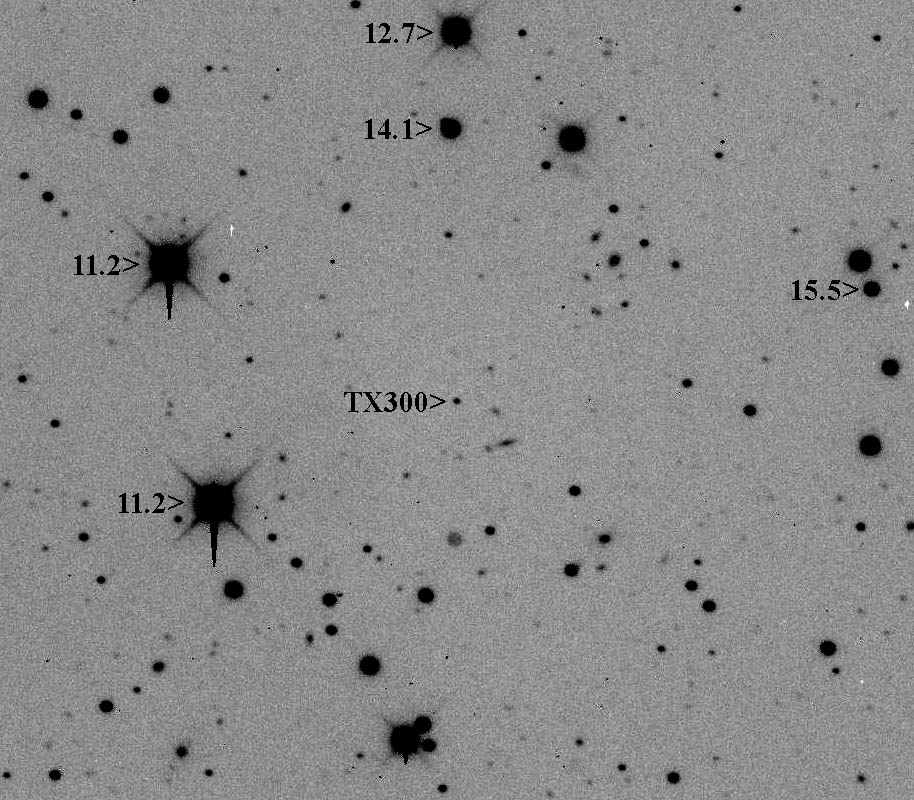
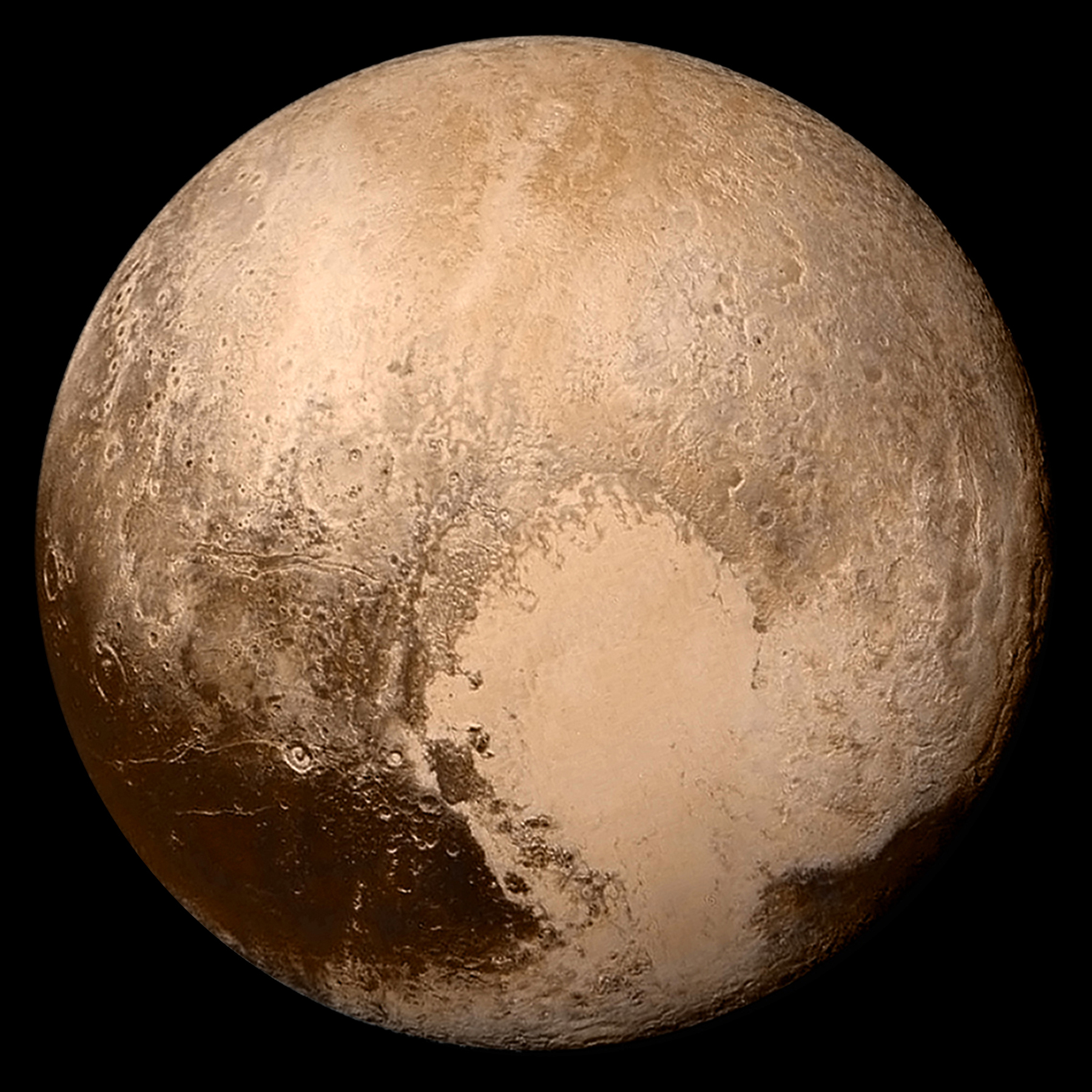
- Compilation of 15 imaged trans-Neptunian objects. The first image compares some of the largest TNOs in terms of size, color and albedo.

This is a list of trans-Neptunian objects (TNOs), which are minor planets in the Solar System that orbit the Sun at a greater distance on average than Neptune, which means all of their orbits have a semi-major axis greater than 30.1 astronomical units (AU). The Kuiper belt, scattered disc, and Oort cloud are three conventional divisions of this volume of space. (Note: The treatments vary and a few objects such as Sedna do not fit easily into any division. The literature is inconsistent in the use of the phrases "scattered disc" and "Kuiper belt". For some, they are distinct populations; for others, the scattered disk is part of the Kuiper belt, in which case the low-eccentricity population is called the "classical Kuiper belt". Authors may even switch between these two uses in a single publication. This lists shows all minor planets with a semi-major axis larger than 30.1 AU, irrespective whether they are dynamically categorized as TNOs (resonant and classical), SDOs, centaurs or damocloids) As of November 2026, the catalog of minor planets contains 1,049 numbered TNOs. In addition, there are 7,256 unnumbered TNOs, which have been observed since 1993.

This list consists of all types of TNO subgroups: classical Kuiper belt objects, also known as "cubewanos", the resonant trans-Neptunian objects with their main and higher-order resonant subgroups, the scattered disc objects (SDOs), and the extreme trans-Neptunian objects including the ESDOs, EDDOs, and sednoids, which have a semi-major axis of at least 150 AU and a perihelion (closest approach to the Sun) greater than that of Neptune. The list also contains several centaurs, if the object's orbit has a sufficiently large semi-major axis (a). Centaurs have unstable orbits in which the perihelion (q) is well inside of Neptune's orbit but the farthest point (aphelion, Q) is very distant.

The first TNO to be discovered was Pluto in 1930. It became the namesake of a larger group of resonant objects called plutinos (another such resonant subgroup are the twotinos). It took more than 60 years to discover a second TNO, Albion (provisionally known as 1992 QB_{1}), in 1992. The largest known trans-Neptunian objects are Pluto and Eris, followed by Haumea, Makemake, Gonggong, Quaoar, Sedna, and Orcus, all of them being officially recognized as dwarf planets by the IAU except for Gonggong, Sedna, and Orcus. There are also many possible dwarf planets, such as Salacia, Máni, Varda, Ixion, and Varuna. Most TNOs have low albedos typically around 0.09. Their color varies from blue-grey to very red (classes BB, BR, IR and RR). The following list also gives an object's full designation, mean-diameter (D), and discovery circumstances (date, discoverer and discovery site), as well as its orbital inclination (i) and eccentricity (e).

== List ==
This list includes all numbered trans-Neptunian objects with a semi-major axis greater than 30.1 astronomical units (AU), Neptune's average orbital distance from the Sun. The data is sourced from MPC's "List of Trans Neptunian Objects", "List Of Centaurs and Scattered-Disk Objects", "List of Neptune Trojans", "List Of Other Unusual Objects", and "Database Search", completed with remarks and information from Johnston's Archive (diameter, class, binary, albedo, spectral taxonomy and B–R color index).

Designation	Discovery			D (km)	Orbital description						Remarks	Refs
Designation	Year	Site	Discoverer	D (km)	Class	a (AU)	e	i (°)	q (AU)	Q (AU)	Remarks	Refs
15760 Albion	1992	568	Jewitt, D. C., Luu, J. X.	125	cubewano (cold)	44.2	0.07	2	41.0	47.4	albedo: 0.152; BRmag: 1.65; taxonomy: IR-RR	catalog; MPC; JPL
(15788) 1993 SB	1993	950	Williams, I. P., Fitzsimmons, A., O'Ceallaigh, D.	125	plutino	39.7	0.33	2	26.8	52.7	albedo: 0.074; BRmag: 1.24; taxonomy: BR	catalog; MPC; JPL
(15789) 1993 SC	1993	950	Williams, I. P., Fitzsimmons, A., O'Ceallaigh, D.	398	plutino	39.7	0.18	5	32.4	47.0	albedo: 0.035; BRmag: 1.62; taxonomy: RR	catalog; MPC; JPL
(15807) 1994 GV9	1994	568	Jewitt, D. C., Chen, J.	117	cubewano (cold)	43.7	0.06	1	40.9	46.4	albedo: 0.152	catalog; MPC; JPL
(15809) 1994 JS	1994	807	Jewitt, D. C., Luu, J. X.	111	res · 3:5	42.0	0.21	14	33.0	51.0	albedo: 0.126	catalog; MPC; JPL
15810 Arawn	1994	950	Irwin, M. J., Zytkow, A.	142	plutino	39.2	0.11	4	34.7	43.7	albedo: 0.074; BRmag: 1.61	catalog; MPC; JPL
(15820) 1994 TB	1994	568	Jewitt, D. C., Chen, J.	85	plutino	39.9	0.32	12	27.0	52.7	albedo: 0.172; BRmag: 1.64; taxonomy: RR	catalog; MPC; JPL
(15836) 1995 DA_{2}	1995	568	Luu, J. X., Jewitt, D. C.	91	res · 3:4	36.4	0.08	7	33.6	39.2	albedo: 0.126; BRmag: 1.82	catalog; MPC; JPL
(15874) 1996 TL66	1996	568	Trujillo, C. A., Jewitt, D. C., Luu, J. X., Chen, J.	339	SDO	84.9	0.59	24	35.1	134.7	albedo: 0.11; BRmag: 0.71; taxonomy: BB	catalog; MPC; JPL
(15875) 1996 TP66	1996	568	Luu, J. X., Jewitt, D. C., Trujillo, C. A.	350	plutino	39.7	0.33	6	26.4	53.0	albedo: 0.03; BRmag: 1.79; taxonomy: RR	catalog; MPC; JPL
(15883) 1997 CR_{29}	1997	568	Trujillo, C. A., Chen, J., Jewitt, D. C.	182	cubewano (hot)?	47.2	0.22	19	37.0	57.4	albedo: 0.079; BRmag: 1.26; taxonomy: BR-IR	catalog; MPC; JPL
(16684) 1994 JQ_{1}	1994	950	Irwin, M. J., Zytkow, A.	155	cubewano (cold)	43.9	0.05	4	41.9	45.9	albedo: 0.152; BRmag: 1.83; taxonomy: RR	catalog; MPC; JPL
(19255) 1994 VK8	1994	950	Fitzsimmons, A., O'Ceallaigh, D., Williams, I. P.	140	cubewano (cold)	43.1	0.03	2	41.6	44.6	albedo: 0.152; BRmag: 1.68; taxonomy: RR	catalog; MPC; JPL
(19299) 1996 SZ_{4}	1996	950	Fitzsimmons, A., Irwin, M. J., Williams, I. P.	99	plutino	39.9	0.26	5	29.4	50.5	albedo: 0.074; BRmag: 1.16; taxonomy: BR	catalog; MPC; JPL
(19308) 1996 TO66	1996	568	Trujillo, C. A., Jewitt, D. C., Luu, J. X.	409	Haumea	43.5	0.11	27	38.5	48.4	albedo: 0.168; BRmag: 1.06; taxonomy: BBb?	catalog; MPC; JPL
19521 Chaos	1998	695	Deep Ecliptic Survey	415	cubewano (hot)	46.1	0.11	12	41.0	51.2	albedo: 0.05; BRmag: 1.58; taxonomy: IR	catalog; MPC; JPL
20000 Varuna	2000	691	Spacewatch	654	cubewano (hot)?	43.2	0.05	17	40.9	45.4	albedo: 0.127; BRmag: 1.53; taxonomy: IR	catalog; MPC; JPL
(20108) 1995 QZ_{9}	1995	568	Jewitt, D. C., Chen, J.	145	plutino	39.7	0.15	20	33.9	45.5	albedo: 0.074; BRmag: 1.4	catalog; MPC; JPL
(20161) 1996 TR66	1996	568	Jewitt, D. C., Trujillo, C. A., Luu, J. X., Chen, J.	122	twotino	48.0	0.40	12	29.0	66.9	albedo: 0.126	catalog; MPC; JPL
(24835) 1995 SM55	1995	691	Danzl, N.	186.7	Haumea	42.1	0.11	27	37.4	46.8	albedo: 0.04; BRmag: 0.96; taxonomy: BBb?	catalog; MPC; JPL
(24952) 1997 QJ_{4}	1997	568	Luu, J. X., Trujillo, C. A., Jewitt, D. C., Berney, K.	154	plutino	39.7	0.23	17	30.5	48.9	albedo: 0.074; BRmag: 1.1; taxonomy: BR-BB	catalog; MPC; JPL
(24978) 1998 HJ_{151}	1998	568	Luu, J. X., Trujillo, C. A., Tholen, D. J., Jewitt, D. C.	119	cubewano (cold)	43.1	0.05	2	41.0	45.2	albedo: 0.152; BRmag: 1.82	catalog; MPC; JPL
(26181) 1996 GQ_{21}	1996	691	Danzl, N.	352	SDO	92.5	0.59	13	38.2	146.8	albedo: 0.098; BRmag: 1.74; taxonomy: RR	catalog; MPC; JPL
(26308) 1998 SM165	1998	691	Danzl, N.	287	twotino	47.9	0.37	14	30.2	65.6	binary: 96 km; possible triple; albedo: 0.07; BRmag: 1.58; taxonomy: RR	catalog; MPC; JPL
(26375) 1999 DE9	1999	695	Trujillo, C. A., Luu, J. X.	311	res · 2:5	55.5	0.42	8	32.2	78.8	albedo: 0.163; BRmag: 1.54; taxonomy: IR	catalog; MPC; JPL
28978 Ixion	2001	807	Deep Ecliptic Survey	696.78	plutino	39.4	0.24	20	29.7	49.0	albedo: 0.106; BRmag: 1.64; taxonomy: IR	catalog; MPC; JPL
(29981) 1999 TD_{10}	1999	691	Spacewatch	104	centaur	98.5	0.87	6	12.4	184.5	albedo: 0.044; BRmag: 1.23; taxonomy: BR	catalog; MPC; JPL
(32929) 1995 QY_{9}	1995	568	Jewitt, D. C., Chen, J.	66	plutino	39.9	0.27	5	29.3	50.6	albedo: 0.4; BRmag: 1.14; taxonomy: BR-U	catalog; MPC; JPL
(33001) 1997 CU29	1997	568	Jewitt, D. C., Luu, J. X., Trujillo, C. A., Chen, J.	177	cubewano (cold)	43.6	0.04	2	42.1	45.1	albedo: 0.152; BRmag: 1.71; taxonomy: RR	catalog; MPC; JPL
(33128) 1998 BU48	1998	691	Danzl, N.	213	centaur	33.3	0.39	14	20.5	46.2	albedo: 0.052; BRmag: 1.75; taxonomy: RR	catalog; MPC; JPL
(33340) 1998 VG44	1998	691	Larsen, J. A., Danzl, N., Gleason, A.	248	plutino	39.6	0.26	3	29.4	49.8	albedo: 0.063; BRmag: 1.47; taxonomy: IR	catalog; MPC; JPL
(35671) 1998 SN165	1998	691	Gleason, A.	393	other TNO	38.1	0.05	5	36.3	39.9	albedo: 0.06; BRmag: 1.11; taxonomy: BB	catalog; MPC; JPL
38083 Rhadamanthus	1999	695	Deep Ecliptic Survey	145	other TNO	38.9	0.16	13	32.8	45.0	albedo: 0.13; BRmag: 1.18; taxonomy: BR	catalog; MPC; JPL
(38084) 1999 HB_{12}	1999	695	Buie, M. W., Millis, R.	145	res · 2:5	55.3	0.41	13	32.5	78.0	albedo: 0.126; BRmag: 1.42; taxonomy: BR-IR	catalog; MPC; JPL
38628 Huya	2000	303	Ferrin, I. R.	411	plutino	39.2	0.27	16	28.5	49.9	binary: 213 km; albedo: 0.079; BRmag: 1.49; taxonomy: IR	catalog; MPC; JPL
(40314) 1999 KR16	1999	809	Dalsanti, A., Hainaut, O. R.	271	other TNO	48.5	0.30	25	33.9	63.0	albedo: 0.177; BRmag: 1.88; taxonomy: RR	catalog; MPC; JPL
(42301) 2001 UR163	2001	695	Deep Ecliptic Survey	367	res · 4:9	51.8	0.28	1	37.3	66.3	albedo: 0.22; BRmag: 1.97; taxonomy: RR-U	catalog; MPC; JPL
42355 Typhon	2002	644	NEAT	162	centaur	37.7	0.54	2	17.5	57.9	binary: 89 km; albedo: 0.044; BRmag: 1.38; taxonomy: BR	catalog; MPC; JPL
(44594) 1999 OX3	1999	568	Kavelaars, J. J., Gladman, B., Holman, M. J., Petit, J.-M.	135	centaur	32.7	0.46	3	17.6	47.7	albedo: 0.081; BRmag: 1.98; taxonomy: RR	catalog; MPC; JPL
(45802) 2000 PV_{29}	2000	568	Holman, M. J.	91	cubewano (cold)	43.4	0.01	1	43.0	43.8	albedo: 0.152	catalog; MPC; JPL
47171 Lempo	1999	695	Rubenstein, E. P., Strolger, L.-G.	272	plutino	39.7	0.23	8	30.6	48.8	triple: 132 km, 251 km; albedo: 0.079; BRmag: 1.73; taxonomy: RR	catalog; MPC; JPL
(47932) 2000 GN_{171}	2000	691	Gleason, A.	147	plutino	39.1	0.28	11	28.3	50.0	albedo: 0.215; BRmag: 1.54; taxonomy: IR	catalog; MPC; JPL
(48639) 1995 TL8	1995	691	Gleason, A.	176	other TNO	52.9	0.24	0	40.3	65.5	binary: 81 km; albedo: 0.369; BRmag: 1.73; taxonomy: RR	catalog; MPC; JPL
(49673) 1999 RA_{215}	1999	695	Davis, D., Gladman, B., Meese, C.	142	cubewano (hot)?	43.2	0.11	23	38.6	47.8	albedo: 0.079	catalog; MPC; JPL
50000 Quaoar	2002	644	Trujillo, C. A., Brown, M. E.	1115.7	cubewano (hot)	43.1	0.04	8	41.6	44.7	binary: 200 km; rings; albedo: 0.124; BRmag: 1.61; taxonomy: RR	catalog; MPC; JPL
(52747) 1998 HM151	1998	568	Mauna Kea	95	cubewano (cold)	44.2	0.06	1	41.7	46.7	albedo: 0.152; BRmag: 1.55	catalog; MPC; JPL
53311 Deucalion	1999	695	Deep Ecliptic Survey	155	cubewano (cold)	43.9	0.06	0	41.3	46.5	albedo: 0.152; BRmag: 2.03	catalog; MPC; JPL
(54520) 2000 PJ_{30}	2000	568	Holman, M. J.	139	centaur	121.9	0.77	6	28.6	215.2	albedo: 0.058	catalog; MPC; JPL
55565 Aya	2002	675	Palomar	802	cubewano (hot)?	47.3	0.13	24	41.3	53.3	albedo: 0.101; BRmag: 1.52; taxonomy: IR	catalog; MPC; JPL
(55636) 2002 TX300	2002	644	NEAT	286	Haumea	43.5	0.12	26	38.2	48.8	albedo: 0.88; BRmag: 1.03; taxonomy: BBb	catalog; MPC; JPL
55637 Uni	2002	291	Spacewatch	571	cubewano (hot)?	43.0	0.15	19	36.7	49.3	binary: 190 km; albedo: 0.107; BRmag: 1.49; taxonomy: IR	catalog; MPC; JPL
(55638) 2002 VE95	2002	644	NEAT	250	plutino	39.6	0.29	16	28.0	51.2	albedo: 0.149; BRmag: 1.79; taxonomy: RR	catalog; MPC; JPL
58534 Logos	1997	568	Mauna Kea	82	cubewano (cold)	45.2	0.12	3	39.7	50.8	binary: 67 km; possible triple; albedo: 0.195; BRmag: 1.67; taxonomy: RR	catalog; MPC; JPL
(59358) 1999 CL_{158}	1999	568	Luu, J. X., Trujillo, C. A., Jewitt, D. C.	196	cubewano (hot)?	41.6	0.21	10	32.8	50.3	albedo: 0.079; BRmag: 1.19; taxonomy: BB-BR	catalog; MPC; JPL
(60454) 2000 CH_{105}	2000	695	Buie, M. W.	153	cubewano (cold)	44.3	0.08	1	40.6	48.0	albedo: 0.152; BRmag: 1.7; taxonomy: RR	catalog; MPC; JPL
(60458) 2000 CM_{114}	2000	695	Buie, M. W.	100	SDO	59.6	0.40	20	35.5	83.7	binary: 77 km; albedo: 0.124; BRmag: 1.23; taxonomy: U	catalog; MPC; JPL
(60608) 2000 EE_{173}	2000	695	Luu, J. X., Trujillo, C. A., Evans, W.	117	centaur	49.0	0.54	6	22.5	75.5	albedo: 0.054; BRmag: 1.16; taxonomy: BR	catalog; MPC; JPL
(60620) 2000 FD_{8}	2000	568	Kavelaars, J. J., Gladman, B., Petit, J.-M., Holman, M. J.	177	res · 4:7?	43.6	0.22	20	34.1	53.1	albedo: 0.126; BRmag: 1.81; taxonomy: RR	catalog; MPC; JPL
(60621) 2000 FE8	2000	568	Kavelaars, J. J., Gladman, B., Petit, J.-M., Holman, M. J.	127	res · 2:5	55.2	0.40	6	32.9	77.5	binary: 96 km; albedo: 0.126; BRmag: 1.12; taxonomy: BR	catalog; MPC; JPL
(65407) 2002 RP120	2002	699	LONEOS	15	damocloid	54.5	0.95	119	2.5	106.6	albedo: 0.098; BRmag: 1.37	catalog; MPC; JPL
65489 Ceto	2003	644	Trujillo, C. A., Brown, M. E.	223	centaur	100.5	0.82	22	17.7	183.2	binary: 171 km; albedo: 0.056; BRmag: 1.42; taxonomy: BR-IR	catalog; MPC; JPL
(66452) 1999 OF_{4}	1999	568	Mauna Kea	148	cubewano (cold)	45.0	0.06	3	42.1	47.8	albedo: 0.152; BRmag: 1.83; taxonomy: RR	catalog; MPC; JPL
66652 Borasisi	1999	568	Trujillo, C. A., Luu, J. X., Jewitt, D. C.	126	cubewano (cold)	43.8	0.09	1	40.1	47.5	binary: 103 km; albedo: 0.236; BRmag: 1.47; taxonomy: IR-RR	catalog; MPC; JPL
(69986) 1998 WW_{24}	1998	695	Buie, M. W.	94	plutino	39.7	0.23	14	30.7	48.8	albedo: 0.074; BRmag: 1.11; taxonomy: BR	catalog; MPC; JPL
(69987) 1998 WA_{25}	1998	695	Buie, M. W.	131	cubewano (cold)	42.8	0.02	1	41.9	43.8	albedo: 0.152	catalog; MPC; JPL
(69988) 1998 WA_{31}	1998	695	Buie, M. W.	159	res · 2:5	55.6	0.43	10	31.8	79.4	albedo: 0.126; BRmag: 1.42; taxonomy: BR-BB	catalog; MPC; JPL
(69990) 1998 WU_{31}	1998	695	Buie, M. W.	113	plutino	39.5	0.19	7	32.1	47.0	albedo: 0.074; BRmag: 1.22; taxonomy: U	catalog; MPC; JPL
(73480) 2002 PN_{34}	2002	644	NEAT	112	centaur	31.0	0.57	17	13.4	48.6	albedo: 0.049; BRmag: 1.28; taxonomy: BR	catalog; MPC; JPL
(76803) 2000 PK_{30}	2000	568	Holman, M. J.	128	other TNO	38.6	0.12	34	34.0	43.3	albedo: 0.13	catalog; MPC; JPL
78799 Xewioso	2002	644	Palomar	565	centaur	37.7	0.24	14	28.5	46.9	albedo: 0.038	catalog; MPC; JPL
79360 Sila–Nunam	1997	568	Luu, J. X., Jewitt, D. C., Trujillo, C. A., Chen, J.	249	cubewano (cold)	44.0	0.01	2	43.4	44.7	binary: 236 km; albedo: 0.09; BRmag: 1.61; taxonomy: RR	catalog; MPC; JPL
(79969) 1999 CP_{133}	1999	568	Trujillo, C. A., Luu, J. X., Jewitt, D. C.	106	res · 4:5	34.8	0.09	3	31.9	37.8	albedo: 0.126; BRmag: 1.23; taxonomy: BR	catalog; MPC; JPL
(79978) 1999 CC_{158}	1999	568	Jewitt, D. C., Trujillo, C. A., Luu, J. X., Sheppard, S. S.	266	res · 5:12	54.2	0.28	19	39.0	69.3	albedo: 0.126; BRmag: 1.64; taxonomy: RR-IR	catalog; MPC; JPL
(79983) 1999 DF9	1999	695	Luu, J. X., Trujillo, C. A., Jewitt, D. C.	288	cubewano (hot)	46.4	0.14	10	39.7	53.1	albedo: 0.079; BRmag: 1.63; taxonomy: RR	catalog; MPC; JPL
(80806) 2000 CM_{105}	2000	695	Buie, M. W.	125	cubewano (cold)	42.3	0.07	4	39.4	45.1	binary: 95 km; albedo: 0.152; BRmag: 1.98	catalog; MPC; JPL
(82075) 2000 YW134	2000	691	Spacewatch	413	res · 3:8	58.2	0.29	20	41.1	75.3	binary: 143 km; albedo: 0.133; BRmag: 1.26; taxonomy: IR	catalog; MPC; JPL
(82155) 2001 FZ_{173}	2001	691	Spacewatch	212	SDO	84.6	0.62	13	32.4	136.9	albedo: 0.121; BRmag: 1.45; taxonomy: IR	catalog; MPC; JPL
(82157) 2001 FM_{185}	2001	695	Buie, M. W.	108	other TNO	38.5	0.06	5	36.3	40.7	binary: 94 km; albedo: 0.13	catalog; MPC; JPL
(82158) 2001 FP185	2001	695	Buie, M. W.	332	SDO	213.4	0.84	31	34.2	392.6	albedo: 0.046; BRmag: 1.38; taxonomy: IR	catalog; MPC; JPL
(84522) 2002 TC302	2002	644	Palomar	500	res · 2:5	55.8	0.30	35	39.1	72.6	albedo: 0.147; BRmag: 1.76; taxonomy: RR	catalog; MPC; JPL
(84719) 2002 VR128	2002	644	Trujillo, C. A., Brown, M. E.	448	plutino	39.7	0.26	14	29.3	50.0	albedo: 0.052; BRmag: 1.54	catalog; MPC; JPL
(84922) 2003 VS2	2003	644	NEAT	524	plutino	39.7	0.08	15	36.5	43.0	albedo: 0.134; BRmag: 1.4	catalog; MPC; JPL
(85627) 1998 HP151	1998	568	Mauna Kea	121	cubewano (cold)	43.8	0.08	2	40.1	47.5	albedo: 0.152	catalog; MPC; JPL
(85633) 1998 KR65	1998	807	Bernstein, G.	154	cubewano (cold)	43.5	0.03	1	42.0	45.0	albedo: 0.152; BRmag: 1.49; taxonomy: RR	catalog; MPC; JPL
(86047) 1999 OY3	1999	568	Mauna Kea	88	Haumea	43.8	0.17	24	36.4	51.2	albedo: 0.44; BRmag: 1.01; taxonomy: U	catalog; MPC; JPL
(86177) 1999 RY_{215}	1999	568	Mauna Kea	263	cubewano (hot)?	45.4	0.24	22	34.5	56.4	albedo: 0.032; BRmag: 1.28; taxonomy: BR	catalog; MPC; JPL
(87269) 2000 OO67	2000	807	Cerro Tololo	84	centaur	617.9	0.97	20	20.9	1215.0	albedo: 0.058; BRmag: 1.69; taxonomy: RR	catalog; MPC; JPL
(87555) 2000 QB_{243}	2000	807	Cerro Tololo	92	centaur	34.9	0.56	7	15.3	54.5	albedo: 0.104; BRmag: 1.15; taxonomy: U	catalog; MPC; JPL
(88267) 2001 KE_{76}	2001	807	Buie, M. W.	157	cubewano (cold)	42.8	0.03	1	41.6	43.9	albedo: 0.152	catalog; MPC; JPL
(88268) 2001 KK_{76}	2001	807	Buie, M. W.	187	cubewano (cold)	42.3	0.01	2	41.7	42.9	albedo: 0.152; BRmag: 1.84	catalog; MPC; JPL
88611 Teharonhiawako	2001	807	Deep Ecliptic Survey	178	cubewano (cold)	44.0	0.03	3	42.9	45.2	binary: 129 km; albedo: 0.145; BRmag: 1.62	catalog; MPC; JPL
90377 Sedna	2003	675	Brown, M. E., Trujillo, C. A., Rabinowitz, D. L.	906	sednoid	549.6	0.86	12	76.2	1022.9	albedo: 0.32; BRmag: 1.68; taxonomy: RR	catalog; MPC; JPL
90482 Orcus	2004	675	Brown, M. E., Trujillo, C. A., Rabinowitz, D. L.	910	plutino	39.3	0.22	21	30.6	48.1	binary: 443 km; albedo: 0.23; BRmag: 1.05; taxonomy: BB	catalog; MPC; JPL
90568 Goibniu	2004	644	NEAT	680	cubewano (hot)?	41.8	0.08	22	38.6	45.0	albedo: 0.077; BRmag: 1.4; taxonomy: BR-IR	catalog; MPC; JPL
(91133) 1998 HK151	1998	568	Mauna Kea	146	plutino	39.2	0.23	6	30.3	48.0	albedo: 0.074; BRmag: 1.24; taxonomy: BR	catalog; MPC; JPL
(91205) 1998 US43	1998	695	Buie, M. W.	109	plutino	39.5	0.13	11	34.3	44.8	albedo: 0.074; BRmag: 1.18; taxonomy: BB-BR	catalog; MPC; JPL
(91554) 1999 RZ_{215}	1999	568	Luu, J. X., Trujillo, C. A., Jewitt, D. C.	120	SDO	102.1	0.70	26	31.0	173.2	albedo: 0.124; BRmag: 1.35; taxonomy: IR-BR	catalog; MPC; JPL
(95625) 2002 GX_{32}	2002	807	Buie, M. W., Jordan, A. B., Elliot, J. L.	132	res · 3:7	52.7	0.37	14	33.0	72.4	albedo: 0.126	catalog; MPC; JPL
(118228) 1996 TQ66	1996	568	Chen, J., Jewitt, D. C., Trujillo, C. A., Luu, J. X.	180	plutino	39.7	0.13	15	34.7	44.7	albedo: 0.074; BRmag: 1.91; taxonomy: RR	catalog; MPC; JPL
(118378) 1999 HT11	1999	695	Kitt Peak	132	res · 4:7	43.6	0.11	5	38.8	48.3	albedo: 0.126; BRmag: 1.82; taxonomy: RR	catalog; MPC; JPL
(118379) 1999 HC_{12}	1999	695	Kitt Peak	144	cubewano (hot)?	45.1	0.24	15	34.5	55.7	albedo: 0.079; BRmag: 1.38	catalog; MPC; JPL
(118698) 2000 OY_{51}	2000	309	Gladman, B.	83	res · 4:7	43.6	0.23	11	33.5	53.8	albedo: 0.126	catalog; MPC; JPL
(118702) 2000 OM_{67}	2000	807	Buie, M. W., Kern, S. D.	179	SDO	98.8	0.60	23	39.3	158.2	albedo: 0.124; BRmag: 1.29; taxonomy: IR	catalog; MPC; JPL
(119066) 2001 KJ_{76}	2001	807	Buie, M. W.	186	res · 4:7	43.5	0.08	7	40.1	46.8	albedo: 0.126	catalog; MPC; JPL
(119067) 2001 KP_{76}	2001	807	Buie, M. W.	147	res · 4:7?	43.4	0.19	7	35.2	51.5	binary: 140 km; albedo: 0.126	catalog; MPC; JPL
(119068) 2001 KC_{77}	2001	807	Buie, M. W.	184	res · 2:5	54.7	0.35	13	35.4	74.1	albedo: 0.126; BRmag: 1.47	catalog; MPC; JPL
(119069) 2001 KN_{77}	2001	807	Buie, M. W.	160	plutino	39.0	0.24	2	29.7	48.2	albedo: 0.074	catalog; MPC; JPL
(119070) 2001 KP77	2001	807	Buie, M. W.	146	res · 4:7	43.4	0.17	3	36.0	50.9	albedo: 0.126; BRmag: 1.52	catalog; MPC; JPL
(119473) 2001 UO_{18}	2001	695	Buie, M. W.	115	plutino	40.0	0.29	4	28.3	51.7	albedo: 0.074; BRmag: 2.06	catalog; MPC; JPL
(119878) 2002 CY_{224}	2002	695	Buie, M. W.	220	res · 5:12	54.1	0.35	16	35.2	73.0	albedo: 0.098; BRmag: 1.86; taxonomy: RR	catalog; MPC; JPL
(119951) 2002 KX14	2002	675	Trujillo, C. A., Brown, M. E.	389	other TNO	38.6	0.05	0	36.9	40.4	albedo: 0.119; BRmag: 1.66; taxonomy: IR	catalog; MPC; JPL
(119956) 2002 PA_{149}	2002	807	Buie, M. W.	195	res · 4:7	43.7	0.17	4	36.2	51.1	albedo: 0.126; BRmag: 1.79; taxonomy: RR	catalog; MPC; JPL
(119979) 2002 WC19	2002	644	Palomar	338	twotino	48.3	0.27	9	35.4	61.1	binary: 81 km; albedo: 0.167; BRmag: 1.79; taxonomy: RR	catalog; MPC; JPL
(120132) 2003 FY128	2003	644	NEAT	460	SDO	49.3	0.25	12	36.9	61.6	albedo: 0.079; BRmag: 1.65; taxonomy: IR	catalog; MPC; JPL
(120178) 2003 OP32	2003	675	Brown, M. E., Trujillo, C. A., Rabinowitz, D. L.	274	Haumea	43.2	0.10	27	38.7	47.6	albedo: 0.54; BRmag: 1.01; taxonomy: BBb?	catalog; MPC; JPL
(120181) 2003 UR_{292}	2003	695	Buie, M. W.	136	centaur	32.6	0.18	3	26.8	38.4	albedo: 0.105; BRmag: 1.69	catalog; MPC; JPL
(120216) 2004 EW95	2004	691	Spacewatch	291	plutino	39.2	0.31	29	27.0	51.4	albedo: 0.044; BRmag: 1.07; taxonomy: BB	catalog; MPC; JPL
120347 Salacia	2004	675	Roe, H. G., Brown, M. E., Barkume, K. M.	838	cubewano (hot)?	42.1	0.10	24	37.8	46.5	binary: 290 km; albedo: 0.041; BRmag: 1.03; taxonomy: BB	catalog; MPC; JPL
(120348) 2004 TY364	2004	675	Brown, M. E., Trujillo, C. A., Rabinowitz, D. L.	512	other TNO	39.1	0.07	25	36.5	41.7	albedo: 0.107; BRmag: 1.66; taxonomy: BR-IR	catalog; MPC; JPL
(123509) 2000 WK_{183}	2000	809	Hainaut, O. R., Delahodde, C. E., Delsanti, A. C.	106	cubewano (cold)	44.7	0.05	2	42.4	47.0	binary: 101 km; albedo: 0.18	catalog; MPC; JPL
(126154) 2001 YH_{140}	2001	675	Trujillo, C. A., Brown, M. E.	345	res · 3:5	42.5	0.15	11	36.4	48.7	albedo: 0.08; BRmag: 1.53; taxonomy: IR	catalog; MPC; JPL
(126155) 2001 YJ_{140}	2001	675	Trujillo, C. A., Brown, M. E.	154	plutino	39.7	0.30	6	27.9	51.6	albedo: 0.074	catalog; MPC; JPL
(126619) 2002 CX_{154}	2002	695	Buie, M. W.	127	SDO	71.4	0.47	16	37.9	104.8	albedo: 0.124; BRmag: 1.47; taxonomy: IR	catalog; MPC; JPL
(126719) 2002 CC_{249}	2002	695	Buie, M. W.	162	cubewano (cold)?	47.0	0.19	1	38.0	55.9	albedo: 0.152	catalog; MPC; JPL
(127546) 2002 XU93	2002	695	Buie, M. W.	164	centaur	66.9	0.69	78	21.0	112.8	albedo: 0.038; BRmag: 1.2; taxonomy: BB-BR	catalog; MPC; JPL
(127871) 2003 FC_{128}	2003	695	Buie, M. W.	123	res · 4:5	34.9	0.09	2	31.9	38.0	albedo: 0.126; BRmag: 1.89; taxonomy: RR	catalog; MPC; JPL
(129746) 1999 CE_{119}	1999	568	Luu, J. X., Trujillo, C. A., Jewitt, D. C.	104	plutino	39.1	0.27	2	28.7	49.5	albedo: 0.074	catalog; MPC; JPL
(129772) 1999 HR_{11}	1999	695	Kitt Peak	132	res · 4:7	43.5	0.03	3	42.1	44.9	albedo: 0.126; BRmag: 1.45	catalog; MPC; JPL
(130391) 2000 JG_{81}	2000	809	La Silla	96	twotino	47.2	0.28	24	34.1	60.3	albedo: 0.126; BRmag: 1.24; taxonomy: BR	catalog; MPC; JPL
(131318) 2001 FL_{194}	2001	695	Kitt Peak	130	plutino	39.2	0.17	14	32.4	46.0	albedo: 0.074	catalog; MPC; JPL
(131695) 2001 XS_{254}	2001	568	Sheppard, S. S., Kleyna, J., Jewitt, D. C.	109	other TNO	37.4	0.06	4	35.3	39.5	albedo: 0.13	catalog; MPC; JPL
(131696) 2001 XT_{254}	2001	568	Sheppard, S. S., Kleyna, J., Jewitt, D. C.	116	res · 3:7	53.3	0.33	1	35.9	70.7	albedo: 0.126; BRmag: 1.34; taxonomy: BR	catalog; MPC; JPL
(131697) 2001 XH_{255}	2001	568	Kleyna, J., Sheppard, S. S., Jewitt, D. C.	82	res · 4:5	35.1	0.08	3	32.4	37.7	albedo: 0.126; BRmag: 1.34; taxonomy: BR-IR	catalog; MPC; JPL
(133067) 2003 FB_{128}	2003	695	Buie, M. W.	218	plutino	39.4	0.26	9	29.2	49.6	albedo: 0.047	catalog; MPC; JPL
(134210) 2005 PQ_{21}	2005	807	Cerro Tololo	127	SDO	62.2	0.40	7	37.7	86.8	albedo: 0.124	catalog; MPC; JPL
134340 Pluto	1930	690	Tombaugh, C. W.	2376.6	plutino	39.3	0.25	17	29.6	49.1	five moons; albedo: 0.72; BRmag: 1.34; taxonomy: BBb	catalog; MPC; JPL
(134568) 1999 RH_{215}	1999	568	Trujillo, C. A., Jewitt, D. C., Luu, J. X.	90	other TNO	43.8	0.15	10	37.2	50.4	albedo: 0.13	catalog; MPC; JPL
(134860) 2000 OJ_{67}	2000	807	Buie, M. W., Kern, S. D.	138	cubewano (cold)	42.9	0.02	1	42.1	43.6	binary: 108 km; albedo: 0.16; BRmag: 1.72; taxonomy: RR	catalog; MPC; JPL
(135024) 2001 KO_{76}	2001	807	Buie, M. W.	150	res · 4:7	43.5	0.11	2	38.7	48.3	albedo: 0.126; BRmag: 1.81; taxonomy: RR	catalog; MPC; JPL
(135182) 2001 QT_{322}	2001	807	Buie, M. W.	159	other TNO	37.2	0.02	2	36.6	37.8	albedo: 0.085; BRmag: 1.24	catalog; MPC; JPL
(135571) 2002 GG_{32}	2002	807	Buie, M. W.	140	res · 2:5	54.9	0.35	15	35.8	74.0	albedo: 0.126; BRmag: 1.94; taxonomy: RR	catalog; MPC; JPL
(135742) 2002 PB_{171}	2002	568	Mauna Kea	154	res · 4:7	43.7	0.12	6	38.3	49.0	albedo: 0.126	catalog; MPC; JPL
136108 Haumea	2003	J86	Sierra Nevada	1544	Haumea	43.0	0.20	28	34.6	51.4	triple: 150 km, 350 km; rings; albedo: 0.51; BRmag: 0.98; taxonomy: BBb	catalog; MPC; JPL
(136120) 2003 LG_{7}	2003	807	Buie, M. W.	125	res · 1:3	61.7	0.48	20	32.4	91.1	albedo: 0.126; BRmag: 1.2; taxonomy: BR	catalog; MPC; JPL
136199 Eris	2003	644	Brown, M. E., Trujillo, C. A., Rabinowitz, D. L.	2326	SDO	68.0	0.44	44	38.3	97.7	binary: 700 km; albedo: 0.96; BRmag: 1.21; taxonomy: BBb	catalog; MPC; JPL
136472 Makemake	2005	644	Brown, M. E., Trujillo, C. A., Rabinowitz, D. L.	1430	cubewano (hot)?	45.5	0.16	29	38.2	52.8	binary: 175 km; albedo: 0.8; BRmag: 1.33; taxonomy: BB-U	catalog; MPC; JPL
(137294) 1999 RE_{215}	1999	568	Trujillo, C. A., Luu, J. X., Jewitt, D. C.	172	cubewano (cold)	45.0	0.10	1	40.4	49.7	albedo: 0.152; BRmag: 1.7; taxonomy: RR	catalog; MPC; JPL
(137295) 1999 RB_{216}	1999	568	Trujillo, C. A., Jewitt, D. C., Luu, J. X.	124	twotino	47.9	0.30	13	33.7	62.2	albedo: 0.126; BRmag: 1.52; taxonomy: IR-BR	catalog; MPC; JPL
(138537) 2000 OK_{67}	2000	807	Buie, M. W., Kern, S. D.	164	cubewano (cold)	46.7	0.14	5	40.0	53.3	albedo: 0.169; BRmag: 1.25; taxonomy: RR-U	catalog; MPC; JPL
(138628) 2000 QM_{251}	2000	807	Buie, M. W.	117	other TNO	44.9	0.27	16	33.0	56.9	albedo: 0.13; BRmag: 1.6	catalog; MPC; JPL
(139775) 2001 QG298	2001	807	Buie, M. W.	156	plutino	39.6	0.20	7	31.8	47.4	binary: 135 km; albedo: 0.074; BRmag: 1.6	catalog; MPC; JPL
(143685) 2003 SS_{317}	2003	568	Mauna Kea	87	res · 3:4	36.7	0.24	6	27.9	45.5	albedo: 0.126; BRmag: 1.7; taxonomy: RR	catalog; MPC; JPL
(143707) 2003 UY117	2003	691	Spacewatch	235	res · 2:5	56.1	0.42	8	32.5	79.7	albedo: 0.139; BRmag: 1.53; taxonomy: IR	catalog; MPC; JPL
(143751) 2003 US_{292}	2003	695	Buie, M. W.	78	res · 3:5	42.5	0.26	8	31.6	53.4	albedo: 0.126	catalog; MPC; JPL
(143991) 2003 YO_{179}	2003	568	Mauna Kea	349	cubewano (hot)?	44.9	0.14	19	38.5	51.3	albedo: 0.079	catalog; MPC; JPL
(144897) 2004 UX10	2004	705	Becker, A. C., Puckett, A. W., Kubica, J.	398	plutino?	39.2	0.04	10	37.7	40.7	albedo: 0.141; BRmag: 1.53; taxonomy: IR-BR	catalog; MPC; JPL
145451 Rumina	2005	705	Becker, A. C., Puckett, A. W., Kubica, J.	524	SDO	92.3	0.62	29	35.2	149.4	albedo: 0.102; BRmag: 0.99; taxonomy: BB	catalog; MPC; JPL
145452 Ritona	2005	705	Becker, A. C., Puckett, A. W., Kubica, J.	679	cubewano (hot)?	41.6	0.02	19	40.6	42.5	albedo: 0.107; BRmag: 1.54; taxonomy: IR	catalog; MPC; JPL
(145453) 2005 RR43	2005	705	Becker, A. C., Puckett, A. W., Kubica, J.	300	Haumea	43.5	0.14	28	37.4	49.7	albedo: 0.44; BRmag: 1.18; taxonomy: BB	catalog; MPC; JPL
(145474) 2005 SA_{278}	2005	705	Becker, A. C., Puckett, A. W., Kubica, J.	208	SDO	94.4	0.65	16	33.1	155.8	albedo: 0.124	catalog; MPC; JPL
(145480) 2005 TB190	2005	705	Becker, A. C., Puckett, A. W., Kubica, J.	464	SDO	75.9	0.39	27	46.2	105.6	albedo: 0.148; BRmag: 1.54; taxonomy: IR	catalog; MPC; JPL
(148112) 1999 RA_{216}	1999	568	Trujillo, C. A., Jewitt, D. C., Luu, J. X.	131	cubewano (cold)	44.1	0.04	1	42.5	45.7	albedo: 0.152	catalog; MPC; JPL
(148209) 2000 CR105	2000	695	Buie, M. W.	223	SDO	228.4	0.81	23	44.1	412.8	albedo: 0.124; BRmag: 1.28; taxonomy: IR-BR	catalog; MPC; JPL
148780 Altjira	2001	695	Deep Ecliptic Survey	191	cubewano (hot)	44.5	0.06	5	42.0	47.1	binary: 172 km; albedo: 0.071; BRmag: 1.65; taxonomy: RR-IR	catalog; MPC; JPL
(149348) 2002 VS_{130}	2002	695	Buie, M. W.	182	cubewano (cold)	45.4	0.12	3	39.8	51.0	albedo: 0.152	catalog; MPC; JPL
(149349) 2002 VA_{131}	2002	695	Buie, M. W.	167	res · 3:5	42.6	0.25	7	32.2	53.1	albedo: 0.126; BRmag: 2.1; taxonomy: U	catalog; MPC; JPL
(149560) 2003 QZ_{91}	2003	807	Buie, M. W.	158	centaur	41.5	0.48	35	21.8	61.3	albedo: 0.058; BRmag: 1.3	catalog; MPC; JPL
(150642) 2001 CZ_{31}	2001	568	Veillet, C.	302	cubewano (hot)	45.3	0.12	10	39.8	50.8	albedo: 0.079; BRmag: 1.1	catalog; MPC; JPL
(160091) 2000 OL_{67}	2000	807	Buie, M. W., Kern, S. D.	110	cubewano (cold)	45.2	0.11	2	40.3	50.0	binary: 83 km; albedo: 0.152	catalog; MPC; JPL
(160147) 2001 KN_{76}	2001	807	Buie, M. W.	181	cubewano (cold)	43.5	0.08	3	39.8	47.2	albedo: 0.152; BRmag: 1.65; taxonomy: RR-IR	catalog; MPC; JPL
(160148) 2001 KV_{76}	2001	807	Buie, M. W.	115	res · 2:7	69.0	0.50	15	34.4	103.6	albedo: 0.126	catalog; MPC; JPL
(160256) 2002 PD_{149}	2002	807	Buie, M. W.	123	cubewano (cold)	43.1	0.06	5	40.4	45.8	binary: 102 km; albedo: 0.152	catalog; MPC; JPL
(168700) 2000 GE_{147}	2000	568	Jewitt, D. C., Trujillo, C. A., Sheppard, S. S.	109	plutino	39.2	0.23	5	30.2	48.1	albedo: 0.074	catalog; MPC; JPL
(168703) 2000 GP_{183}	2000	568	Mauna Kea	300	plutino?	39.6	0.07	5	36.8	42.4	albedo: 0.074; BRmag: 1.16; taxonomy: BB	catalog; MPC; JPL
(169071) 2001 FR_{185}	2001	695	Buie, M. W.	123	plutino	39.1	0.19	6	31.7	46.4	albedo: 0.074	catalog; MPC; JPL
174567 Varda	2003	691	Larsen, J. A.	648	cubewano (hot)?	45.5	0.14	22	39.0	52.1	binary: 326 km; albedo: 0.099; BRmag: 1.45; taxonomy: IR	catalog; MPC; JPL
(175113) 2004 PF115	2004	644	Brown, M. E., Trujillo, C. W., Rabinowitz, D. L.	468	other TNO	39.0	0.07	13	36.4	41.6	albedo: 0.123	catalog; MPC; JPL
(181708) 1993 FW	1993	568	Jewitt, D. C., Luu, J. X.	199	cubewano (hot)	43.6	0.05	8	41.6	45.5	albedo: 0.079; BRmag: 1.67; taxonomy: IR	catalog; MPC; JPL
(181855) 1998 WT_{31}	1998	695	Buie, M. W.	136	cubewano (hot)?	46.4	0.19	29	37.6	55.2	albedo: 0.079; BRmag: 1.23; taxonomy: BB	catalog; MPC; JPL
(181867) 1999 CV_{118}	1999	568	Jewitt, D. C., Trujillo, C. A., Luu, J. X.	121	res · 3:7	53.1	0.29	6	37.5	68.7	albedo: 0.126; BRmag: 2.13; taxonomy: RR	catalog; MPC; JPL
(181868) 1999 CG_{119}	1999	568	Luu, J. X., Trujillo, C. A., Jewitt, D. C.	120	SDO	49.7	0.29	17	35.2	64.2	albedo: 0.124; BRmag: 1.53	catalog; MPC; JPL
(181871) 1999 CO_{153}	1999	568	Trujillo, C. A., Luu, J. X., Jewitt, D. C.	128	res · 4:7	43.8	0.09	1	40.0	47.7	albedo: 0.126; BRmag: 2.03; taxonomy: RR	catalog; MPC; JPL
(181874) 1999 HW_{11}	1999	695	Kitt Peak	158	other TNO	52.5	0.26	17	39.0	66.0	albedo: 0.13; BRmag: 1.32; taxonomy: BR	catalog; MPC; JPL
(181902) 1999 RD_{215}	1999	568	Trujillo, C. A., Luu, J. X., Jewitt, D. C.	125	SDO	124.1	0.70	26	37.7	210.5	albedo: 0.124	catalog; MPC; JPL
(182222) 2000 YU_{1}	2000	695	Holman, M. J., Gladman, B., Grav, T.	167	cubewano (hot)	43.9	0.10	6	39.6	48.3	albedo: 0.079	catalog; MPC; JPL
(182223) 2000 YC_{2}	2000	695	Holman, M. J., Gladman, B., Grav, T.	116	SDO	59.0	0.39	20	36.2	81.9	albedo: 0.124	catalog; MPC; JPL
(182294) 2001 KU76	2001	807	Buie, M. W.	182	res · 6:11?	44.8	0.16	11	37.7	51.8	albedo: 0.126	catalog; MPC; JPL
(182397) 2001 QW_{297}	2001	807	Buie, M. W.	206	res · 4:9	51.6	0.23	17	39.7	63.6	albedo: 0.126; BRmag: 1.6; taxonomy: IR-RR	catalog; MPC; JPL
(182926) 2002 FU_{6}	2002	568	Gladman, B., Kavelaars, J. J., Doressoundiram, A.	117	cubewano (cold)	45.7	0.15	2	39.1	52.3	albedo: 0.152	catalog; MPC; JPL
(182933) 2002 GZ_{31}	2002	807	Buie, M. W.	163	SDO	50.2	0.24	1	38.3	62.0	binary: 103 km; albedo: 0.124; BRmag: 1.75	catalog; MPC; JPL
(182934) 2002 GJ_{32}	2002	807	Buie, M. W.	416	cubewano (hot)?	44.1	0.11	12	39.2	49.0	albedo: 0.035; BRmag: 1.5; taxonomy: RR	catalog; MPC; JPL
(183595) 2003 TG_{58}	2003	568	Mauna Kea	165	cubewano (cold)	44.9	0.11	2	40.1	49.7	albedo: 0.152	catalog; MPC; JPL
(183963) 2004 DJ_{64}	2004	695	Buie, M. W.	130	cubewano (cold)	44.3	0.10	2	39.9	48.7	albedo: 0.152	catalog; MPC; JPL
(183964) 2004 DJ_{71}	2004	695	Buie, M. W.	112	res · 3:7	53.2	0.39	11	32.7	73.7	albedo: 0.126	catalog; MPC; JPL
(184212) 2004 PB112	2004	807	Buie, M. W.	123	SDO	109.0	0.68	15	35.4	182.6	albedo: 0.124	catalog; MPC; JPL
184314 Mbabamwanawaresa	2005	695	Buie, M. W.	253	cubewano (hot)	45.0	0.14	6	38.8	51.1	albedo: 0.079	catalog; MPC; JPL
(202421) 2005 UQ513	2005	644	Palomar	498	cubewano (hot)?	43.5	0.15	26	37.2	49.9	albedo: 0.202	catalog; MPC; JPL
208996 Achlys	2003	644	Trujillo, C. A., Brown, M. E.	772	plutino	39.6	0.18	14	32.7	46.6	binary: 72 km; albedo: 0.097; BRmag: 1.06; taxonomy: BB	catalog; MPC; JPL
225088 Gonggong	2007	675	Schwamb, M. E., Brown, M. E., Rabinowitz, D.	1230	res · 3:10	66.9	0.50	31	33.2	100.6	binary: 180 km; albedo: 0.14; BRmag: 2.24	catalog; MPC; JPL
229762 Gǃkúnǁʼhòmdímà	2007	675	Schwamb, M. E., Brown, M. E., Rabinowitz, D.	635	SDO	74.6	0.50	23	37.6	111.6	binary: 112 km; albedo: 0.183; taxonomy: U	catalog; MPC; JPL
(230965) 2004 XA192	2004	644	Palomar	339	other TNO	47.5	0.25	38	35.5	59.5	albedo: 0.26	catalog; MPC; JPL
(241097) 2007 DU_{112}	2007	691	Spacewatch	34	centaur	40.2	0.78	16	9.0	71.4	albedo: 0.058	catalog; MPC; JPL
(275809) 2001 QY297	2001	807	Buie, M. W.	169	cubewano (cold)	43.8	0.08	2	40.3	47.3	binary: 154 km; albedo: 0.152; BRmag: 1.13; taxonomy: BR	catalog; MPC; JPL
(278361) 2007 JJ43	2007	675	Palomar	598	cubewano (hot)?	47.7	0.16	12	40.3	55.1	albedo: 0.079; BRmag: 1.61; taxonomy: IR	catalog; MPC; JPL
(303712) 2005 PR_{21}	2005	807	Cerro Tololo	158	cubewano (cold)	44.2	0.10	1	39.7	48.7	binary: 95 km; albedo: 0.152	catalog; MPC; JPL
(303775) 2005 QU182	2005	644	Palomar	416	SDO	112.2	0.67	14	37.1	187.3	albedo: 0.328; BRmag: 1.43	catalog; MPC; JPL
(305543) 2008 QY_{40}	2008	675	Schwamb, M. E., Brown, M. E., Rabinowitz, D.	317	SDO	62.4	0.41	25	36.8	87.9	albedo: 0.124	catalog; MPC; JPL
(306792) 2001 KQ_{77}	2001	807	Buie, M. W.	186	plutino	39.3	0.15	16	33.3	45.4	albedo: 0.074	catalog; MPC; JPL
(307251) 2002 KW_{14}	2002	675	Trujillo, C. A., Brown, M. E.	161	cubewano (hot)?	46.5	0.20	10	37.1	55.8	albedo: 0.31	catalog; MPC; JPL
307261 Máni	2002	644	Trujillo, C. A., Brown, M. E.	796	cubewano (hot)?	41.6	0.15	18	35.4	47.8	albedo: 0.1; BRmag: 1.07	catalog; MPC; JPL
(307463) 2002 VU130	2002	695	Buie, M. W.	253	plutino	39.4	0.21	1	31.2	47.7	albedo: 0.179	catalog; MPC; JPL
(307616) 2003 QW_{90}	2003	807	Buie, M. W.	401	cubewano (hot)	44.0	0.08	10	40.5	47.5	albedo: 0.084; BRmag: 1.78; taxonomy: RR	catalog; MPC; JPL
(307982) 2004 PG_{115}	2004	644	Palomar	334	SDO	90.0	0.60	16	36.5	143.6	albedo: 0.101; BRmag: 1.58	catalog; MPC; JPL
(308193) 2005 CB79	2005	644	Palomar	234	Haumea	43.4	0.14	29	37.2	49.6	albedo: 0.44; BRmag: 1.1; taxonomy: BB	catalog; MPC; JPL
(308379) 2005 RS_{43}	2005	705	Becker, A. C., Puckett, A. W., Kubica, J.	228	twotino	48.0	0.20	10	38.5	57.5	albedo: 0.311; BRmag: 1.37; taxonomy: BR	catalog; MPC; JPL
(308460) 2005 SC_{278}	2005	705	Becker, A. C., Puckett, A. W., Kubica, J.	129	res · 4:5	35.0	0.07	2	32.5	37.5	albedo: 0.126; BRmag: 2.03; taxonomy: RR	catalog; MPC; JPL
(308634) 2005 XU_{100}	2005	695	Buie, M. W.	247	cubewano (hot)	43.6	0.11	8	38.9	48.2	albedo: 0.079	catalog; MPC; JPL
(308933) 2006 SQ372	2006	705	Becker, A. C., Puckett, A. W., Kubica, J.	142	centaur	839.5	0.97	20	24.2	1654.9	albedo: 0.058; BRmag: 1.62; taxonomy: IR-RR	catalog; MPC; JPL
(309239) 2007 RW10	2007	675	Palomar	247	centaur	30.3	0.30	36	21.3	39.4	albedo: 0.083	catalog; MPC; JPL
(312645) 2010 EP_{65}	2010	809	Rabinowitz, D., Tourtellotte, S.	304	twotino	47.4	0.30	19	33.0	61.8	albedo: 0.126	catalog; MPC; JPL
(315530) 2008 AP129	2008	675	Schwamb, M. E., Brown, M. E.	218	Haumea	42.0	0.14	27	36.0	48.0	albedo: 0.44	catalog; MPC; JPL
(316179) 2010 EN65	2010	809	Rabinowitz, D., Tourtellotte, S.	204	centaur	30.7	0.32	19	21.0	40.3	albedo: 0.058	catalog; MPC; JPL
(336756) 2010 NV1	2010	291	Spacewatch	52	centaur	305.2	0.97	141	9.5	601.0	albedo: 0.042; BRmag: 1.32	catalog; MPC; JPL
341520 Mors–Somnus	2007	568	Sheppard, S. S., Trujillo, C.	102	plutino	39.6	0.27	11	28.9	50.3	binary: 97 km; albedo: 0.23; BRmag: 2.03	catalog; MPC; JPL
(353222) 2009 YD_{7}	2009	809	Rabinowitz, D. L.	53	centaur	125.7	0.89	31	13.4	238.1	albedo: 0.058	catalog; MPC; JPL
(363330) 2002 PQ_{145}	2002	807	Buie, M. W.	230	cubewano (cold)	43.8	0.05	3	41.6	46.0	albedo: 0.152	catalog; MPC; JPL
(363401) 2003 LB_{7}	2003	807	Buie, M. W.	155	cubewano (cold)	45.4	0.13	2	39.5	51.2	albedo: 0.152	catalog; MPC; JPL
(364171) 2006 JZ_{81}	2006	568	Mauna Kea	122	cubewano (cold)	44.5	0.08	4	41.1	47.9	binary: 78 km; albedo: 0.17	catalog; MPC; JPL
(385185) 1993 RO	1993	568	Jewitt, D. C., Luu, J. X.	130	plutino	39.5	0.20	4	31.6	47.3	albedo: 0.074; BRmag: 1.64; taxonomy: IR	catalog; MPC; JPL
(385191) 1997 RT_{5}	1997	675	Nicholson, P., Gladman, B., Burns, J. A.	183	cubewano (hot)	41.5	0.02	13	40.5	42.4	albedo: 0.079; BRmag: 1.55	catalog; MPC; JPL
(385194) 1998 KG_{62}	1998	807	Bernstein, G.	165	cubewano (cold)	43.4	0.05	1	41.1	45.7	albedo: 0.152; BRmag: 1.53; taxonomy: RR-IR	catalog; MPC; JPL
(385199) 1999 OE_{4}	1999	568	Mauna Kea	181	cubewano (cold)	45.4	0.05	2	43.3	47.5	albedo: 0.152; BRmag: 1.83; taxonomy: U	catalog; MPC; JPL
(385201) 1999 RN_{215}	1999	568	Jewitt, D. C., Luu, J. X., Trujillo, C. A.	238	cubewano (hot)	43.4	0.07	12	40.4	46.3	albedo: 0.079	catalog; MPC; JPL
(385266) 2001 QB_{298}	2001	807	Buie, M. W.	196	cubewano (cold)	42.7	0.09	2	38.6	46.7	albedo: 0.167	catalog; MPC; JPL
(385362) 2002 PT_{170}	2002	568	Mauna Kea	176	cubewano (cold)	46.3	0.15	4	39.5	53.1	albedo: 0.152	catalog; MPC; JPL
(385363) 2002 PW_{170}	2002	568	Mauna Kea	192	cubewano (cold)	44.9	0.07	4	41.7	48.1	albedo: 0.152	catalog; MPC; JPL
(385437) 2003 GH_{55}	2003	807	Deep Lens Survey	178	cubewano (cold)	44.0	0.08	1	40.6	47.3	albedo: 0.15; BRmag: 1.75; taxonomy: U	catalog; MPC; JPL
(385445) 2003 QH_{91}	2003	807	Buie, M. W.	223	plutino	39.4	0.15	4	33.5	45.3	albedo: 0.074	catalog; MPC; JPL
385446 Manwë	2003	807	Buie, M. W.	160	res · 4:7	43.8	0.12	3	38.7	48.9	binary: 92 km; albedo: 0.1; BRmag: 1.68; taxonomy: RR	catalog; MPC; JPL
(385447) 2003 QF_{113}	2003	807	Buie, M. W.	169	cubewano (cold)	43.8	0.03	5	42.6	45.0	albedo: 0.152	catalog; MPC; JPL
(385458) 2003 SP_{317}	2003	568	Mauna Kea	170	cubewano (hot)	46.2	0.17	5	38.2	54.2	albedo: 0.079	catalog; MPC; JPL
(385527) 2004 OK_{14}	2004	807	Buie, M. W.	119	res · 4:7	43.8	0.24	4	33.1	54.5	albedo: 0.126	catalog; MPC; JPL
(385528) 2004 OR_{15}	2004	568	Canada-France Ecliptic Plane Survey	112	SDO	56.1	0.34	7	37.2	75.0	albedo: 0.124	catalog; MPC; JPL
(385533) 2004 QD_{29}	2005	568	B. J. Gladman	151	other TNO	43.0	0.11	24	38.2	47.8	albedo: 0.13	catalog; MPC; JPL
385571 Otrera	2004	304	Sheppard, S. S., Trujillo, C.	91	nep trj	30.3	0.03	1	29.3	31.3	albedo: 0.058; BRmag: 1.16	catalog; MPC; JPL
(385607) 2005 EO_{297}	2005	695	Buie, M. W.	135	res · 1:3	62.9	0.35	25	41.1	84.8	albedo: 0.126; BRmag: 1.32; taxonomy: BR-IR	catalog; MPC; JPL
385695 Clete	2005	304	Trujillo, C. A., Sheppard, S. S.	111	nep trj	30.3	0.06	5	28.6	32.1	albedo: 0.058; BRmag: 1.34	catalog; MPC; JPL
(386723) 2009 YE7	2009	809	Rabinowitz, D. L.	243	Haumea	44.6	0.14	29	38.5	50.7	albedo: 0.44	catalog; MPC; JPL
(408832) 2001 QJ_{298}	2001	807	Buie, M. W.	204	cubewano (cold)	44.2	0.04	2	42.3	46.0	albedo: 0.152	catalog; MPC; JPL
(413666) 2005 VJ_{119}	2005	568	Bernardi, F.	28	centaur	34.9	0.68	7	11.2	58.6	albedo: 0.126	catalog; MPC; JPL
(415720) 1999 RU_{215}	1999	568	Trujillo, C. A., Luu, J. X., Jewitt, D. C.	165	cubewano (hot)	43.3	0.07	8	40.2	46.4	albedo: 0.079	catalog; MPC; JPL
(416400) 2003 UZ117	2003	691	Spacewatch	222	Haumea	44.6	0.14	27	38.4	50.8	albedo: 0.29; BRmag: 0.99; taxonomy: BB	catalog; MPC; JPL
(418993) 2009 MS9	2009	568	Petit, J.-M., Gladman, B., Kavelaars, J. J.	23	centaur	375.7	0.97	68	11.0	740.4	albedo: 0.25; BRmag: 1.36	catalog; MPC; JPL
420356 Praamžius	2012	290	Cernis, K., Boyle, R. P.	241	cubewano (cold)	42.9	0.00	1	42.7	43.1	albedo: 0.152	catalog; MPC; JPL
(427581) 2003 QB_{92}	2003	807	Buie, M. W.	123	res · 4:5	34.9	0.09	4	31.7	38.1	albedo: 0.126	catalog; MPC; JPL
(427614) 2003 SR_{422}	2003	807	Cerro Tololo	182	cubewano (hot)?	40.3	0.05	24	38.2	42.5	albedo: 0.079	catalog; MPC; JPL
(432949) 2012 HH_{2}	2012	H21	Vorobjov, T.	204	res · 4:5	34.8	0.17	29	29.1	40.6	albedo: 0.126	catalog; MPC; JPL
(434194) 2003 FK_{127}	2003	695	Buie, M. W.	127	cubewano (cold)	42.5	0.05	2	40.5	44.5	albedo: 0.152	catalog; MPC; JPL
(434390) 2005 CH_{81}	2005	568	Canada-France Ecliptic Plane Survey	88	SDO	55.4	0.32	5	37.6	73.3	albedo: 0.124	catalog; MPC; JPL
(434709) 2006 CJ_{69}	2006	568	Wiegert, P. A., Papadimos, A.	123	res · 3:5	42.3	0.23	18	32.6	51.9	albedo: 0.126; BRmag: 1.92; taxonomy: RR	catalog; MPC; JPL
(437360) 2013 TV_{158}	2013	W84	DECam	200	SDO	114.1	0.68	31	36.5	191.6	albedo: 0.124	catalog; MPC; JPL
(437871) 2001 FN_{185}	2001	695	Buie, M. W.	163	cubewano (hot)?	42.4	0.07	22	39.4	45.3	albedo: 0.079	catalog; MPC; JPL
(437915) 2002 GD_{32}	2002	807	Buie, M. W.	224	res · 5:9	44.3	0.14	7	38.1	50.6	albedo: 0.126; BRmag: 1.78; taxonomy: RR	catalog; MPC; JPL
(438028) 2004 EH_{96}	2004	695	Buie, M. W.	122	plutino	39.3	0.28	3	28.3	50.3	albedo: 0.074	catalog; MPC; JPL
(439858) 1999 ON_{4}	1999	568	Mauna Kea	110	cubewano (cold)	42.7	0.04	3	41.0	44.4	albedo: 0.152	catalog; MPC; JPL
(443843) 2001 FO_{185}	2001	695	Buie, M. W.	166	cubewano (hot)	46.3	0.12	11	40.9	51.7	albedo: 0.079	catalog; MPC; JPL
(444018) 2004 EU_{95}	2004	695	Buie, M. W.	136	cubewano (cold)	44.0	0.04	3	42.1	45.9	albedo: 0.152	catalog; MPC; JPL
(444025) 2004 HJ_{79}	2013	695	Research and Education Collaborative Occultation Network	106	cubewano (cold)	43.8	0.05	3	41.8	45.8	binary: 66 km; albedo: 0.152	catalog; MPC; JPL
(444030) 2004 NT33	2004	644	Palomar	423	cubewano (hot)?	43.4	0.15	31	37.0	49.9	albedo: 0.125; BRmag: 1.06; taxonomy: BB-BR	catalog; MPC; JPL
(444745) 2007 JF_{43}	2007	675	Palomar	406	plutino	39.2	0.18	15	32.1	46.3	albedo: 0.074	catalog; MPC; JPL
(445473) 2010 VZ98	2010	809	D. L. Rabinowitz, M. E. Schwamb, S. Tourtellotte	371	SDO	159.8	0.79	5	34.4	285.3	albedo: 0.124; BRmag: 1.77	catalog; MPC; JPL
(450265) 2003 WU_{172}	2003	691	Spacewatch	261	plutino	39.5	0.26	4	29.2	49.9	albedo: 0.074	catalog; MPC; JPL
(451657) 2012 WD_{36}	2012	W84	DECam	162	SDO	77.7	0.52	24	37.5	117.9	albedo: 0.124	catalog; MPC; JPL
(455171) 1999 OM_{4}	1999	568	Mauna Kea	139	cubewano (cold)	46.0	0.12	2	40.6	51.4	albedo: 0.152; BRmag: 1.74; taxonomy: IR-RR	catalog; MPC; JPL
(455206) 2001 FE_{193}	2001	695	Allen, R. L., Bernstein, G., Malhotra, R.	137	cubewano (cold)	46.6	0.13	3	40.7	52.5	albedo: 0.152	catalog; MPC; JPL
(455209) 2001 KT_{76}	2001	807	Buie, M. W.	141	cubewano (cold)	44.9	0.09	2	41.0	48.8	albedo: 0.152	catalog; MPC; JPL
(455502) 2003 UZ413	2003	644	Palomar	650	plutino	39.4	0.22	12	30.8	48.0	albedo: 0.075; taxonomy: BB	catalog; MPC; JPL
(456826) 2007 TH_{422}	2007	705	Becker, A. C., Puckett, A. W., Kubica, J.	148	plutino	39.7	0.28	29	28.5	50.8	albedo: 0.074	catalog; MPC; JPL
(468422) 2000 FA_{8}	2000	568	Kavelaars, J. J., Gladman, B., Petit, J.-M., Holman, M. J.	108	cubewano (cold)	43.8	0.03	1	42.6	45.0	albedo: 0.152	catalog; MPC; JPL
(468861) 2013 LU28	2013	G96	Mt. Lemmon Survey	125	centaur	180.9	0.95	125	8.7	353.0	albedo: 0.058	catalog; MPC; JPL
(469306) 1999 CD158	1999	568	Luu, J. X., Jewitt, D. C., Trujillo, C. A.	310	res · 4:7?	43.8	0.14	25	37.6	50.0	albedo: 0.13; BRmag: 1.35; taxonomy: IR	catalog; MPC; JPL
(469333) 2000 PE_{30}	2000	568	Holman, M. J.	225	SDO	54.2	0.34	18	35.8	72.7	albedo: 0.124; BRmag: 1.19; taxonomy: BB	catalog; MPC; JPL
(469361) 2001 HY_{65}	2001	568	Meech, K. J., Buie, M. W.	249	cubewano (hot)?	43.1	0.12	17	37.8	48.3	albedo: 0.079; BRmag: 1.51; taxonomy: IR	catalog; MPC; JPL
(469362) 2001 KB_{77}	2001	807	Buie, M. W.	140	plutino	39.4	0.28	18	28.4	50.3	albedo: 0.074; BRmag: 1.39	catalog; MPC; JPL
(469372) 2001 QF298	2001	807	Buie, M. W.	408	plutino	39.5	0.11	22	35.2	43.7	albedo: 0.071; BRmag: 1.72; taxonomy: BB	catalog; MPC; JPL
(469420) 2001 XP_{254}	2001	568	Jewitt, D. C., Sheppard, S. S., Kleyna, J.	85	res · 3:5	42.4	0.22	3	33.0	51.9	binary: 60 km; albedo: 0.126; BRmag: 1.71	catalog; MPC; JPL
(469421) 2001 XD_{255}	2001	568	Sheppard, S. S., Jewitt, D. C., Kleyna, J.	346	plutino	39.6	0.11	18	35.2	43.9	albedo: 0.074	catalog; MPC; JPL
(469438) 2002 GV_{31}	2002	807	Buie, M. W.	130	cubewano (cold)	44.0	0.09	2	40.0	48.0	albedo: 0.22	catalog; MPC; JPL
(469442) 2002 GG_{166}	2002	807	Deep Ecliptic Survey	125	centaur	34.2	0.59	8	14.1	54.3	albedo: 0.058	catalog; MPC; JPL
(469505) 2003 FE_{128}	2003	695	Buie, M. W.	152	twotino	47.7	0.25	3	35.8	59.6	binary: 112 km; albedo: 0.079	catalog; MPC; JPL
(469506) 2003 FF_{128}	2003	695	Buie, M. W.	131	plutino	39.3	0.21	2	31.0	47.6	albedo: 0.18; BRmag: 1.76	catalog; MPC; JPL
(469509) 2003 HC_{57}	2003	568	Mauna Kea	161	cubewano (cold)	43.9	0.06	1	41.1	46.7	binary: 153 km; albedo: 0.152	catalog; MPC; JPL
(469514) 2003 QA_{91}	2003	807	Buie, M. W.	209	cubewano (cold)	44.4	0.07	2	41.3	47.6	binary: 200 km; albedo: 0.134	catalog; MPC; JPL
(469584) 2003 YW_{179}	2003	568	Mauna Kea	143	res · 3:5	42.4	0.16	2	35.7	49.1	albedo: 0.126; BRmag: 1.94; taxonomy: RR	catalog; MPC; JPL
(469610) 2004 HF_{79}	2004	568	CFHT Legacy Survey	137	cubewano (cold)	43.1	0.02	2	42.1	44.1	binary: 111 km; albedo: 0.152	catalog; MPC; JPL
(469615) 2004 PT_{107}	2004	807	Buie, M. W.	400	cubewano (hot)?	40.6	0.06	26	38.2	43.0	albedo: 0.032; BRmag: 1.47	catalog; MPC; JPL
(469704) 2005 EZ_{296}	2005	695	Buie, M. W.	184	plutino	39.3	0.15	2	33.5	45.1	albedo: 0.074	catalog; MPC; JPL
469705 ǂKá̦gára	2005	695	Buie, M. W.	138	cubewano (cold)	44.1	0.09	3	40.1	48.0	binary: 105 km; albedo: 0.16	catalog; MPC; JPL
(469707) 2005 GB_{187}	2005	695	Buie, M. W.	174	plutino	39.3	0.23	15	30.1	48.4	albedo: 0.074	catalog; MPC; JPL
(469708) 2005 GE_{187}	2005	695	Buie, M. W.	150	plutino	39.1	0.32	18	26.6	51.7	albedo: 0.074; BRmag: 1.74	catalog; MPC; JPL
(469750) 2005 PU_{21}	2005	807	Cerro Tololo	283	centaur	181.0	0.84	6	29.2	332.7	albedo: 0.058; BRmag: 1.79; taxonomy: RR	catalog; MPC; JPL
(469987) 2006 HJ123	2006	807	Buie, M. W.	216	plutino	39.2	0.30	13	27.5	51.0	albedo: 0.281	catalog; MPC; JPL
(470027) 2006 RC_{103}	2006	705	Becker, A. C., Puckett, A. W., Kubica, J.	293	cubewano (hot)?	42.1	0.15	17	36.0	48.2	albedo: 0.079	catalog; MPC; JPL
(470083) 2006 SG_{369}	2006	705	Becker, A. C., Puckett, A. W., Kubica, J.	108	twotino	48.3	0.37	14	30.2	66.4	albedo: 0.126; BRmag: 1.78; taxonomy: RR	catalog; MPC; JPL
(470308) 2007 JH43	2007	675	Palomar	531	plutino	39.3	0.03	18	38.0	40.5	albedo: 0.074	catalog; MPC; JPL
(470309) 2007 JK_{43}	2007	675	Palomar	192	centaur	45.9	0.49	45	23.5	68.3	albedo: 0.058; BRmag: 1.4	catalog; MPC; JPL
(470316) 2007 OC10	2007	675	Palomar	330	SDO	49.6	0.29	22	35.5	63.8	albedo: 0.112; BRmag: 1.41; taxonomy: IR	catalog; MPC; JPL
(470443) 2007 XV_{50}	2007	675	Palomar	563	cubewano (hot)?	46.3	0.06	23	43.3	49.2	albedo: 0.079	catalog; MPC; JPL
(470523) 2008 CS_{190}	2008	675	Palomar	213	res · 3:5	42.4	0.16	16	35.5	49.3	albedo: 0.126	catalog; MPC; JPL
(470593) 2008 LP_{17}	2008	675	Palomar	273	centaur	88.2	0.66	14	29.8	146.5	albedo: 0.058	catalog; MPC; JPL
(470596) 2008 NW_{4}	2008	675	Palomar	344	cubewano (hot)?	45.1	0.19	23	36.6	53.7	albedo: 0.079	catalog; MPC; JPL
(470599) 2008 OG19	2008	675	Palomar	406	SDO	66.3	0.42	13	38.6	94.0	albedo: 0.124; BRmag: 1.47; taxonomy: IR-RR	catalog; MPC; JPL
(471137) 2010 ET_{65}	2010	809	Rabinowitz, D. L., Tourtellotte, S.	343	SDO	62.1	0.36	31	39.6	84.7	albedo: 0.124	catalog; MPC; JPL
471143 Dziewanna	2010	304	Udalski, A., Kubiak, S. S. Sheppard, M., Trujillo, C. A.	470	res · 2:7	68.8	0.53	30	32.5	105.1	albedo: 0.25	catalog; MPC; JPL
(471150) 2010 FC_{49}	2010	809	Rabinowitz, D. L., Tourtellotte, S.	249	other TNO	38.9	0.05	40	37.0	40.8	albedo: 0.13	catalog; MPC; JPL
(471151) 2010 FD_{49}	2010	809	Rabinowitz, D. L., Tourtellotte, S.	196	res · 2:5	55.1	0.42	11	31.9	78.2	albedo: 0.126	catalog; MPC; JPL
(471152) 2010 FE_{49}	2010	809	Rabinowitz, D. L., Tourtellotte, S.	189	SDO	53.5	0.37	12	33.6	73.5	albedo: 0.124	catalog; MPC; JPL
(471155) 2010 GF_{65}	2010	809	D. L. Rabinowitz, S. Tourtellotte	193	centaur	33.1	0.33	12	22.1	44.2	albedo: 0.058	catalog; MPC; JPL
(471165) 2010 HE_{79}	2002	675	S. S. Sheppard, R. Poleski, A. Udalski, C. A. Trujillo	300	other TNO	38.8	0.18	16	31.8	45.8	binary: 123 km; albedo: 0.13	catalog; MPC; JPL
(471172) 2010 JC_{80}	2010	809	Rabinowitz, D. L., Tourtellotte, S.	224	res · 2:5	54.8	0.43	3	31.5	78.2	albedo: 0.126	catalog; MPC; JPL
(471196) 2010 PK_{66}	2010	809	Rabinowitz, D. L., Schwamb, M., Tourtellotte, S.	355	cubewano (hot)	40.7	0.00	14	40.5	40.8	albedo: 0.079	catalog; MPC; JPL
(471210) 2010 VW_{11}	2010	809	D. L. Rabinowitz, M. E. Schwamb, S. Tourtellotte	317	SDO	51.1	0.29	28	36.6	65.7	albedo: 0.124	catalog; MPC; JPL
(471272) 2011 FY_{9}	2011	809	D. L. Rabinowitz	90	centaur	58.4	0.74	38	15.1	101.6	albedo: 0.058	catalog; MPC; JPL
(471288) 2011 GM27	2011	809	La Silla	329	other TNO	43.6	0.03	13	42.3	45.0	albedo: 0.13	catalog; MPC; JPL
(471318) 2011 JF_{31}	2011	809	La Silla	402	cubewano (hot)?	41.3	0.14	28	35.7	46.9	albedo: 0.079	catalog; MPC; JPL
471325 Taowu	2011	G96	Mt. Lemmon Survey	179	centaur	35.7	0.33	110	23.8	47.5	albedo: 0.058	catalog; MPC; JPL
(471921) 2013 FC_{28}	2013	807	Sheppard, S. S., Trujillo, C. A.	379	cubewano (hot)?	45.9	0.08	16	42.4	49.5	albedo: 0.079	catalog; MPC; JPL
(471954) 2013 RM_{98}	2013	W84	DECam	338	cubewano (hot)?	43.4	0.13	28	37.9	49.0	albedo: 0.079	catalog; MPC; JPL
(472231) 2014 FU_{71}	2014	807	S. S. Sheppard, C. A. Trujillo	242	cubewano (cold)	43.4	0.08	3	40.0	46.8	albedo: 0.152	catalog; MPC; JPL
(472232) 2014 FW_{71}	2014	807	C. A. Trujillo, S. S. Sheppard	302	cubewano (hot)?	42.9	0.06	14	40.5	45.3	albedo: 0.079	catalog; MPC; JPL
472235 Zhulong	2011	809	D. L. Rabinowitz	188	res · 2:5	55.2	0.41	1	32.7	77.6	albedo: 0.126	catalog; MPC; JPL
(472262) 2014 QN_{441}	2014	W84	DECam	168	other TNO	46.6	0.29	21	33.2	60.0	albedo: 0.13	catalog; MPC; JPL
(472271) 2014 UM_{33}	2010	F51	Pan-STARRS 1	491	cubewano (hot)?	43.3	0.16	17	36.5	50.1	albedo: 0.079	catalog; MPC; JPL
474640 Alicanto	2004	807	A. C. Becker	193	EDDO	345.9	0.86	26	47.4	644.5	albedo: 0.124; BRmag: 1.42	catalog; MPC; JPL
(480017) 2014 QB_{442}	2014	F51	Pan-STARRS 1	188	SDO	66.8	0.45	7	36.7	96.9	albedo: 0.124	catalog; MPC; JPL
(482824) 2013 XC_{26}	2013	F51	Pan-STARRS 1	601	cubewano (hot)?	42.6	0.23	19	32.8	52.4	albedo: 0.079	catalog; MPC; JPL
(483002) 2014 QS_{441}	2014	W84	DECam	386	cubewano (hot)?	47.3	0.09	38	43.1	51.5	albedo: 0.079	catalog; MPC; JPL
486958 Arrokoth	2014	250	Buie, M. W., New Horizons Search Team	25	cubewano (cold)	44.1	0.04	2	42.5	45.7	contact binary; albedo: 0.1	catalog; MPC; JPL
(487581) 2015 BE_{519}	2006	807	Deep Ecliptic Survey	287	twotino?	47.8	0.07	25	44.5	51.1	albedo: 0.126	catalog; MPC; JPL
(488644) 2003 HY_{56}	2003	568	Mauna Kea	88	cubewano (cold)	42.5	0.03	3	41.0	43.9	albedo: 0.152	catalog; MPC; JPL
(491767) 2012 VU_{113}	2012	W84	DECam	136	plutino	39.7	0.08	30	36.5	42.9	albedo: 0.074	catalog; MPC; JPL
(491768) 2012 VV_{113}	2012	W84	DECam	157	cubewano (hot)?	46.4	0.12	16	40.8	52.1	albedo: 0.079	catalog; MPC; JPL
(493480) 2014 YZ_{49}	2014	F51	Pan-STARRS 1	416	cubewano (hot)?	40.2	0.02	17	39.5	40.9	albedo: 0.079	catalog; MPC; JPL
(495189) 2012 VR_{113}	2012	W84	Dark Energy Survey	180	twotino	48.0	0.17	19	39.7	56.3	albedo: 0.126	catalog; MPC; JPL
(495190) 2012 VS_{113}	2012	W84	Dark Energy Survey	140	SDO	55.6	0.32	27	38.1	73.1	albedo: 0.124	catalog; MPC; JPL
(495297) 2013 TJ_{159}	2013	W84	DECam	164	res · 3:7	53.3	0.32	5	36.3	70.3	albedo: 0.126	catalog; MPC; JPL
(495603) 2015 AM_{281}	2010	F51	Pan-STARRS 1	412	res · 2:5	55.6	0.25	27	41.5	69.7	albedo: 0.126	catalog; MPC; JPL
(495613) 2015 FG_{345}	2015	F51	Pan-STARRS 1	404	cubewano (hot)?	42.0	0.12	36	36.8	47.3	albedo: 0.079	catalog; MPC; JPL
(496315) 2013 GP136	2013	568	Outer Solar System Origins Survey	173	SDO	148.2	0.72	34	41.0	255.4	albedo: 0.124	catalog; MPC; JPL
(499514) 2010 OO_{127}	2010	F51	Pan-STARRS 1	450	res · 3:5?	42.2	0.13	26	36.6	47.8	albedo: 0.126	catalog; MPC; JPL
(500828) 2013 GR_{136}	2013	568	Outer Solar System Origins Survey	99	res · 4:7	43.5	0.07	2	40.3	46.6	albedo: 0.126	catalog; MPC; JPL
(500829) 2013 GT_{136}	2013	568	Outer Solar System Origins Survey	152	cubewano (hot)?	42.3	0.16	12	35.6	48.9	albedo: 0.079	catalog; MPC; JPL
(500830) 2013 GU_{136}	2014	W84	DECam NEO Survey	117	cubewano (hot)?	44.0	0.17	8	36.6	51.3	albedo: 0.079	catalog; MPC; JPL
(500831) 2013 GV_{136}	2013	568	Outer Solar System Origins Survey	105	cubewano (hot)	41.0	0.04	8	39.5	42.5	albedo: 0.079	catalog; MPC; JPL
(500832) 2013 GZ_{136}	2013	568	Outer Solar System Origins Survey	86	SDO	85.9	0.61	18	33.9	137.9	albedo: 0.124	catalog; MPC; JPL
(500833) 2013 GD_{137}	2013	568	Outer Solar System Origins Survey	102	plutino	39.2	0.10	7	35.2	43.2	albedo: 0.074	catalog; MPC; JPL
(500834) 2013 GK_{137}	2013	568	Outer Solar System Origins Survey	173	plutino	39.1	0.18	10	32.0	46.2	albedo: 0.074	catalog; MPC; JPL
(500835) 2013 GN_{137}	2013	568	Outer Solar System Origins Survey	102	cubewano (cold)	44.0	0.07	3	41.1	46.8	binary: 64 km; albedo: 0.152	catalog; MPC; JPL
(500836) 2013 GQ_{137}	2013	568	Outer Solar System Origins Survey	111	cubewano (cold)	45.5	0.13	3	39.5	51.5	albedo: 0.152	catalog; MPC; JPL
(500837) 2013 GT_{137}	2013	568	Outer Solar System Origins Survey	107	cubewano (cold)	44.5	0.11	2	39.7	49.3	albedo: 0.152	catalog; MPC; JPL
(500838) 2013 GV_{137}	2013	568	Outer Solar System Origins Survey	145	cubewano (cold)	43.6	0.08	3	40.0	47.3	albedo: 0.152	catalog; MPC; JPL
(500839) 2013 GW_{137}	2013	568	Outer Solar System Origins Survey	131	cubewano (hot)	42.7	0.06	5	40.2	45.2	albedo: 0.079	catalog; MPC; JPL
(500840) 2013 GA_{138}	2013	568	Outer Solar System Origins Survey	93	cubewano (cold)	43.6	0.04	4	41.8	45.5	albedo: 0.152	catalog; MPC; JPL
(500856) 2013 HT_{156}	2013	568	Outer Solar System Origins Survey	97	cubewano (cold)	43.9	0.02	4	43.1	44.7	albedo: 0.152	catalog; MPC; JPL
(500876) 2013 JD_{64}	2013	568	Outer Solar System Origins Survey	93	SDO	72.0	0.41	50	42.6	101.3	albedo: 0.124	catalog; MPC; JPL
(500877) 2013 JE_{64}	2013	568	Outer Solar System Origins Survey	82	twotino	47.6	0.28	8	34.1	61.0	albedo: 0.126	catalog; MPC; JPL
(500878) 2013 JG_{64}	2013	568	Outer Solar System Origins Survey	133	cubewano (hot)?	41.6	0.11	18	36.9	46.2	albedo: 0.079	catalog; MPC; JPL
(500879) 2013 JH_{64}	2013	568	Outer Solar System Origins Survey	254	res · 4:11?	59.0	0.39	14	36.2	81.7	albedo: 0.126	catalog; MPC; JPL
(500880) 2013 JJ_{64}	2013	568	Outer Solar System Origins Survey	121	twotino	47.5	0.08	8	43.8	51.3	albedo: 0.126	catalog; MPC; JPL
(500881) 2013 JM_{64}	2013	568	Outer Solar System Origins Survey	107	cubewano (hot)?	42.2	0.05	7	40.2	44.1	albedo: 0.079	catalog; MPC; JPL
(500882) 2013 JN_{64}	2013	568	Outer Solar System Origins Survey	77	res · 3:7	52.7	0.28	8	37.7	67.7	albedo: 0.126	catalog; MPC; JPL
(500883) 2013 JJ_{65}	2013	568	Outer Solar System Origins Survey	162	plutino	39.2	0.26	20	29.1	49.4	albedo: 0.074	catalog; MPC; JPL
(500884) 2013 JK_{65}	2013	568	Outer Solar System Origins Survey	56	plutino	39.2	0.25	20	29.3	49.2	albedo: 0.074	catalog; MPC; JPL
(500885) 2013 JL_{65}	2013	568	Outer Solar System Origins Survey	73	plutino	39.1	0.23	7	30.1	48.2	albedo: 0.074	catalog; MPC; JPL
(500886) 2013 JN_{65}	2013	568	Outer Solar System Origins Survey	150	cubewano (hot)?	40.5	0.02	20	39.9	41.1	albedo: 0.079	catalog; MPC; JPL
(500887) 2013 JO_{65}	2013	568	Outer Solar System Origins Survey	103	cubewano (hot)?	42.2	0.08	10	39.0	45.5	albedo: 0.079	catalog; MPC; JPL
(500888) 2013 JP_{65}	2013	568	Outer Solar System Origins Survey	114	cubewano (hot)	41.1	0.06	13	38.5	43.8	albedo: 0.079	catalog; MPC; JPL
(501105) 2013 SA_{87}	2013	G36	Hellmich, S., Mottola, S.	180	cubewano (hot)?	41.8	0.07	41	38.8	44.8	albedo: 0.079	catalog; MPC; JPL
(501546) 2014 JJ_{80}	2014	F51	Pan-STARRS 1	271	other TNO	43.0	0.27	19	31.2	54.8	albedo: 0.13	catalog; MPC; JPL
(501581) 2014 OB_{394}	2014	F51	Pan-STARRS 1	203	other TNO	46.9	0.25	21	35.0	58.7	albedo: 0.13	catalog; MPC; JPL
(503858) 1998 HQ_{151}	1998	568	Trujillo, C. A., Tholen, D. J., Jewitt, D. C., Luu, J. X.	87	plutino	39.2	0.28	12	28.1	50.3	albedo: 0.074	catalog; MPC; JPL
(503883) 2001 QF_{331}	2001	807	Deep Ecliptic Survey	100	res · 3:5	42.6	0.26	3	31.6	53.5	albedo: 0.126	catalog; MPC; JPL
(504555) 2008 SO_{266}	2008	675	Schwamb, M. E., Brown, M. E., Rabinowitz, D. L.	258	plutino	39.6	0.24	19	30.0	49.3	albedo: 0.074	catalog; MPC; JPL
(504847) 2010 RE_{188}	2010	F51	Pan-STARRS 1	244	cubewano (hot)	46.3	0.15	7	39.2	53.3	albedo: 0.079	catalog; MPC; JPL
(505412) 2013 QO_{95}	2013	W84	Dark Energy Survey	210	cubewano (hot)?	40.2	0.04	21	38.7	41.7	albedo: 0.079	catalog; MPC; JPL
(505446) 2013 SP_{99}	2013	568	Outer Solar System Origins Survey	115	cubewano (cold)	44.0	0.06	1	41.3	46.6	albedo: 0.152	catalog; MPC; JPL
(505447) 2013 SQ_{99}	2013	568	Outer Solar System Origins Survey	132	cubewano (cold)	44.3	0.09	4	40.4	48.2	binary: 107 km; albedo: 0.152	catalog; MPC; JPL
(505448) 2013 SA_{100}	2013	568	Outer Solar System Origins Survey	245	cubewano (hot)	46.5	0.17	9	38.7	54.3	albedo: 0.079	catalog; MPC; JPL
(505476) 2013 UL_{15}	2013	568	Outer Solar System Origins Survey	119	cubewano (cold)	46.0	0.10	2	41.5	50.4	binary: 94 km; albedo: 0.152	catalog; MPC; JPL
(505477) 2013 UM_{15}	2013	568	Outer Solar System Origins Survey	146	res · 6:11	45.2	0.07	2	42.0	48.5	albedo: 0.126	catalog; MPC; JPL
(505478) 2013 UT15	2013	568	Outer Solar System Origins Survey	204	SDO	206.8	0.79	11	43.9	369.6	albedo: 0.124	catalog; MPC; JPL
(505624) 2014 GU_{53}	2014	F51	Pan-STARRS 1	321	cubewano (hot)?	43.3	0.17	24	36.1	50.4	albedo: 0.079	catalog; MPC; JPL
(505679) 2014 WT_{69}	2014	F51	Pan-STARRS 1	249	twotino?	47.9	0.07	12	44.4	51.5	albedo: 0.126	catalog; MPC; JPL
(506121) 2016 BP_{81}	2016	C55	KEPLER	155	cubewano (cold)	43.9	0.07	4	40.6	47.1	binary: 140 km; albedo: 0.152	catalog; MPC; JPL
(506439) 2000 YB_{2}	2000	695	Holman, M. J., Gladman, B., Grav, T.	128	cubewano (cold)	39.0	0.03	4	37.9	40.1	albedo: 0.152; BRmag: 1.49; taxonomy: IR	catalog; MPC; JPL
(506479) 2003 HB57	2003	568	Mauna Kea	119	SDO	157.7	0.76	16	38.1	277.3	albedo: 0.124; BRmag: 1.31; taxonomy: BR	catalog; MPC; JPL
(508338) 2015 SO20	2010	Z79	Schwamb, M. E.	177	SDO	170.5	0.81	23	33.2	307.7	albedo: 0.124	catalog; MPC; JPL
(508770) 1995 WY_{2}	1995	568	Jewitt, D. C., Luu, J. X.	130	cubewano (cold)	46.8	0.13	2	40.7	52.8	albedo: 0.152; BRmag: 1.63	catalog; MPC; JPL
(508788) 2000 CQ_{114}	2000	695	Buie, M. W.	91	cubewano (cold)	46.1	0.12	3	40.8	51.5	binary: 86 km; albedo: 0.147; BRmag: 1.38	catalog; MPC; JPL
(508792) 2000 FX_{53}	2000	568	Trujillo, C. A., Sheppard, S. S., Jewitt, D. C.	97	res · 4:7?	43.4	0.13	5	37.9	49.0	albedo: 0.126	catalog; MPC; JPL
(508823) 2001 RX_{143}	2001	695	Buie, M. W.	233	plutino	39.5	0.29	19	27.9	51.0	albedo: 0.074	catalog; MPC; JPL
(508869) 2002 VT130	2002	695	Buie, M. W.	251	cubewano (cold)	42.7	0.03	1	41.5	44.0	binary: 205 km; albedo: 0.097; BRmag: 2; taxonomy: U	catalog; MPC; JPL
(511551) 2014 UD_{225}	2014	568	Outer Solar System Origins Survey	136	cubewano (cold)	43.5	0.13	4	38.1	49.0	binary: 48 km; albedo: 0.152	catalog; MPC; JPL
(511552) 2014 UE_{225}	2013	568	Outer Solar System Origins Survey	177	cubewano (cold)	43.9	0.06	5	41.2	46.6	albedo: 0.152	catalog; MPC; JPL
(511553) 2014 UK_{225}	2013	568	Outer Solar System Origins Survey	142	cubewano (hot)	43.8	0.13	11	38.0	49.6	albedo: 0.079	catalog; MPC; JPL
(511554) 2014 UL_{225}	2014	695	Outer Solar System Origins Survey	126	cubewano (hot)?	46.7	0.21	8	37.1	56.3	albedo: 0.079	catalog; MPC; JPL
(511555) 2014 UM_{225}	2014	568	Outer Solar System Origins Survey	115	other TNO	44.7	0.10	18	40.2	49.3	albedo: 0.13	catalog; MPC; JPL
(514312) 2016 AE_{193}	2006	D35	LUSS	119	centaur	31.2	0.47	10	16.5	45.9	albedo: 0.058	catalog; MPC; JPL
(516977) 2012 HZ84	2012	268	New Horizons KBO Search	57	res · 9:11?	45.8	0.19	6	37.0	54.5	albedo: 0.126	catalog; MPC; JPL
(517717) 2015 KZ_{120}	2015	F51	Pan-STARRS 1	52	centaur	45.9	0.82	86	8.4	83.3	albedo: 0.058	catalog; MPC; JPL
(523588) 2000 CN_{105}	2000	695	Buie, M. W.	247	cubewano (cold)	44.6	0.10	3	40.2	49.0	albedo: 0.151; BRmag: 1.76; taxonomy: RR	catalog; MPC; JPL
(523591) 2001 QD_{298}	2001	807	Buie, M. W.	233	cubewano (hot)	42.7	0.05	5	40.4	45.0	albedo: 0.067; BRmag: 1.64	catalog; MPC; JPL
(523601) 2003 UY_{413}	2003	644	Palomar	399	cubewano (hot)?	47.5	0.21	21	37.6	57.5	albedo: 0.079	catalog; MPC; JPL
(523615) 2006 UO_{321}	2006	695	Kitt Peak	111	cubewano (cold)	43.9	0.04	2	42.3	45.6	albedo: 0.152	catalog; MPC; JPL
(523617) 2007 PS_{45}	2007	675	Palomar	299	twotino	47.7	0.20	20	38.4	57.1	albedo: 0.126	catalog; MPC; JPL
(523618) 2007 RT_{15}	2007	675	Schwamb, M. E., Brown, M. E., Rabinowitz, D. L.	214	plutino	39.7	0.23	13	30.5	48.9	albedo: 0.074	catalog; MPC; JPL
(523622) 2007 TG422	2007	705	Becker, A. C., Puckett, A. W., Kubica, J.	192	ESDO	567.9	0.94	19	35.6	1100.2	albedo: 0.124; BRmag: 1.39; taxonomy: IR-BR	catalog; MPC; JPL
(523624) 2008 CT_{190}	2008	675	Palomar	214	res · 3:7	52.9	0.34	39	34.7	71.1	binary: 178 km; albedo: 0.126	catalog; MPC; JPL
(523627) 2008 QB_{43}	2008	675	Palomar	332	cubewano (hot)?	41.9	0.10	26	37.7	46.1	albedo: 0.079	catalog; MPC; JPL
(523629) 2008 SP_{266}	2008	675	Schwamb, M. E., Brown, M. E., Rabinowitz, D. L.	333	cubewano (hot)?	41.2	0.13	20	36.1	46.4	albedo: 0.079	catalog; MPC; JPL
(523634) 2010 AH_{2}	2010	291	Spacewatch	327	cubewano (hot)?	40.7	0.05	18	38.8	42.6	albedo: 0.079	catalog; MPC; JPL
(523635) 2010 DN_{93}	2010	F51	Pan-STARRS 1	429	other TNO	55.3	0.19	41	44.9	65.7	albedo: 0.13	catalog; MPC; JPL
(523639) 2010 RE_{64}	2010	809	D. L. Rabinowitz, M. E. Schwamb, S. Tourtellotte	523	SDO	66.2	0.45	14	36.3	96.1	albedo: 0.124	catalog; MPC; JPL
(523640) 2010 RO_{64}	2010	809	D. L. Rabinowitz, M. E. Schwamb, S. Tourtellotte	439	cubewano (hot)?	47.1	0.13	17	41.2	53.0	albedo: 0.079	catalog; MPC; JPL
(523642) 2010 SS_{43}	2010	F51	Pan-STARRS 1	341	cubewano (hot)?	45.7	0.22	35	35.5	55.9	albedo: 0.079	catalog; MPC; JPL
(523643) 2010 TY_{53}	2010	809	D. L. Rabinowitz, M. E. Schwamb, S. Tourtellotte	451	centaur	39.4	0.46	22	21.1	57.7	albedo: 0.058	catalog; MPC; JPL
(523644) 2010 VX_{11}	2010	809	D. L. Rabinowitz, M. E. Schwamb, S. Tourtellotte	272	plutino	39.8	0.29	22	28.2	51.5	albedo: 0.074	catalog; MPC; JPL
(523645) 2010 VK_{201}	2010	809	D. L. Rabinowitz, M. E. Schwamb, S. Tourtellotte	521	cubewano (hot)?	43.5	0.11	29	38.8	48.1	albedo: 0.079	catalog; MPC; JPL
(523646) 2010 VL_{201}	2010	809	D. L. Rabinowitz, M. E. Schwamb, S. Tourtellotte	252	res · 3:4	36.7	0.05	6	34.8	38.6	albedo: 0.126	catalog; MPC; JPL
(523647) 2010 VV_{224}	2010	F51	Pan-STARRS 1	308	cubewano (hot)?	44.5	0.16	25	37.2	51.8	albedo: 0.079	catalog; MPC; JPL
(523652) 2011 LZ_{28}	2011	F51	Pan-STARRS 1	210	centaur	64.1	0.57	14	27.9	100.4	albedo: 0.058	catalog; MPC; JPL
(523653) 2011 OA_{60}	2011	F51	Pan-STARRS 1	374	other TNO	40.7	0.14	23	35.1	46.3	albedo: 0.13	catalog; MPC; JPL
(523655) 2011 VJ_{24}	2011	F51	Pan-STARRS 1	344	plutino	39.9	0.20	10	32.0	47.8	albedo: 0.074	catalog; MPC; JPL
(523658) 2012 DW_{98}	2012	F51	Pan-STARRS 1	297	cubewano (hot)?	41.0	0.03	19	39.7	42.3	albedo: 0.079	catalog; MPC; JPL
(523659) 2012 HG_{84}	2012	809	D. L. Rabinowitz, M. E. Schwamb, S. Tourtellotte	369	cubewano (hot)	42.8	0.08	11	39.2	46.4	albedo: 0.079	catalog; MPC; JPL
(523671) 2013 FZ27	2013	807	S. S. Sheppard, C. A. Trujillo	531	twotino?	48.1	0.21	14	37.8	58.4	albedo: 0.126	catalog; MPC; JPL
(523672) 2013 FJ_{28}	2013	807	C. A. Trujillo, S. S. Sheppard	149	centaur	35.0	0.44	22	19.5	50.4	albedo: 0.058	catalog; MPC; JPL
(523674) 2013 MA_{12}	2013	F51	Pan-STARRS 1	365	cubewano (hot)?	41.4	0.07	23	38.6	44.3	albedo: 0.079	catalog; MPC; JPL
(523675) 2013 PV_{74}	2013	F51	Pan-STARRS 1	277	SDO	49.9	0.23	2	38.7	61.1	albedo: 0.124	catalog; MPC; JPL
(523677) 2013 UF_{15}	2013	F51	Pan-STARRS 1	220	res · 3:5	42.6	0.17	12	35.4	49.9	albedo: 0.126	catalog; MPC; JPL
(523678) 2013 XB_{26}	2013	F51	Pan-STARRS 1	289	cubewano (cold)	45.7	0.01	4	45.3	46.1	albedo: 0.152	catalog; MPC; JPL
(523680) 2013 YJ_{151}	2013	F51	Pan-STARRS 1	293	SDO	73.5	0.44	34	40.8	106.1	albedo: 0.124	catalog; MPC; JPL
(523681) 2014 BV_{64}	2014	F51	Pan-STARRS 1	543	cubewano (hot)?	45.9	0.14	15	39.4	52.3	albedo: 0.079	catalog; MPC; JPL
(523683) 2014 CP_{23}	2014	F51	Pan-STARRS 1	221	SDO	52.4	0.27	29	38.1	66.7	albedo: 0.124	catalog; MPC; JPL
(523684) 2014 CQ_{23}	2014	F51	Pan-STARRS 1	346	cubewano (hot)	45.9	0.16	9	38.7	53.0	albedo: 0.079	catalog; MPC; JPL
(523687) 2014 DF_{143}	2014	F51	Pan-STARRS 1	381	cubewano (hot)?	42.6	0.05	24	40.4	44.8	albedo: 0.079	catalog; MPC; JPL
(523688) 2014 DK_{143}	2014	F51	Pan-STARRS 1	296	res · 3:5	42.1	0.16	11	35.3	49.0	albedo: 0.126	catalog; MPC; JPL
(523689) 2014 DL_{143}	2014	F51	Pan-STARRS 1	273	cubewano (hot)?	46.8	0.22	9	36.7	57.0	albedo: 0.079	catalog; MPC; JPL
(523690) 2014 DN_{143}	2014	F51	Pan-STARRS 1	419	cubewano (hot)	47.1	0.07	7	44.0	50.2	albedo: 0.079	catalog; MPC; JPL
(523691) 2014 DO_{143}	2014	809	D. L. Rabinowitz	278	twotino	47.8	0.11	4	42.7	52.9	albedo: 0.126	catalog; MPC; JPL
(523692) 2014 EZ51	2014	W84	DECam NEO Survey	575	other TNO	51.9	0.23	10	40.0	63.7	albedo: 0.03	catalog; MPC; JPL
(523693) 2014 FT_{71}	2014	807	S. S. Sheppard, C. A. Trujillo	500	cubewano (hot)?	43.4	0.14	28	37.3	49.6	albedo: 0.079	catalog; MPC; JPL
(523695) 2014 GS_{53}	2014	F51	Pan-STARRS 1	291	centaur	33.3	0.10	15	30.0	36.7	albedo: 0.058	catalog; MPC; JPL
(523696) 2014 GW_{53}	2014	F51	Pan-STARRS 1	367	cubewano (hot)	41.1	0.08	22	37.8	44.4	albedo: 0.079	catalog; MPC; JPL
(523697) 2014 GY_{53}	2014	F51	Pan-STARRS 1	217	plutino	39.3	0.29	16	27.7	50.8	albedo: 0.074	catalog; MPC; JPL
(523698) 2014 GD_{54}	2014	F51	Pan-STARRS 1	173	SDO	88.5	0.61	5	34.6	142.4	albedo: 0.124	catalog; MPC; JPL
(523699) 2014 GH_{54}	2014	F51	Pan-STARRS 1	218	SDO	59.2	0.37	27	37.1	81.2	albedo: 0.124	catalog; MPC; JPL
(523700) 2014 GM_{54}	2010	F51	Pan-STARRS 1	181	plutino	39.3	0.39	54	24.1	54.5	albedo: 0.074	catalog; MPC; JPL
(523701) 2014 HT_{199}	2012	F51	Pan-STARRS 1	166	plutino	39.1	0.24	15	29.8	48.4	albedo: 0.074	catalog; MPC; JPL
(523702) 2014 HW_{199}	2014	F51	Pan-STARRS 1	297	cubewano (hot)?	46.0	0.18	16	37.9	54.1	albedo: 0.079	catalog; MPC; JPL
(523703) 2014 HX_{199}	2014	F51	Pan-STARRS 1	182	plutino	39.4	0.22	15	30.6	48.2	albedo: 0.074	catalog; MPC; JPL
(523704) 2014 HB_{200}	2014	F51	Pan-STARRS 1	155	plutino	39.3	0.24	9	29.9	48.6	albedo: 0.074	catalog; MPC; JPL
(523705) 2014 HE_{200}	2014	F51	Pan-STARRS 1	200	SDO	52.1	0.35	9	34.0	70.2	albedo: 0.124	catalog; MPC; JPL
(523706) 2014 HF_{200}	2014	F51	Pan-STARRS 1	259	SDO	60.4	0.41	10	35.5	85.3	albedo: 0.124	catalog; MPC; JPL
(523710) 2014 JF_{80}	2014	F51	Pan-STARRS 1	96	centaur	34.0	0.45	14	18.8	49.2	albedo: 0.058	catalog; MPC; JPL
(523711) 2014 JH_{80}	2014	F51	Pan-STARRS 1	195	cubewano (hot)?	43.4	0.22	48	33.9	52.9	albedo: 0.079	catalog; MPC; JPL
(523712) 2014 JS_{80}	2014	F51	Pan-STARRS 1	355	cubewano (hot)?	47.9	0.16	15	40.0	55.7	albedo: 0.079	catalog; MPC; JPL
(523713) 2014 JX_{80}	2014	F51	Pan-STARRS 1	220	res · 2:5	55.1	0.35	29	35.8	74.5	albedo: 0.126	catalog; MPC; JPL
(523715) 2014 KU_{101}	2013	G36	S. Hellmich, G. Hahn	276	plutino	39.5	0.14	6	34.0	45.0	albedo: 0.074	catalog; MPC; JPL
(523716) 2014 KW_{101}	2014	F51	Pan-STARRS 1	307	cubewano (hot)?	40.6	0.08	19	37.4	43.9	albedo: 0.079	catalog; MPC; JPL
(523717) 2014 KY_{101}	2014	F51	Pan-STARRS 1	246	plutino	39.2	0.20	10	31.4	47.0	albedo: 0.074	catalog; MPC; JPL
(523718) 2014 KZ_{101}	2014	F51	Pan-STARRS 1	189	SDO	120.1	0.72	19	33.6	206.7	albedo: 0.124	catalog; MPC; JPL
(523719) 2014 LM_{28}	2014	F51	Pan-STARRS 1	56	centaur	260.1	0.94	85	16.8	503.4	albedo: 0.058	catalog; MPC; JPL
(523720) 2014 LN_{28}	2014	F51	Pan-STARRS 1	120	centaur	36.3	0.55	9	16.3	56.4	albedo: 0.058	catalog; MPC; JPL
(523721) 2014 LR_{28}	2014	F51	Pan-STARRS 1	297	cubewano (cold)	43.9	0.06	2	41.4	46.4	albedo: 0.152	catalog; MPC; JPL
(523722) 2014 LV_{28}	2014	F51	Pan-STARRS 1	276	SDO	68.7	0.50	11	34.2	103.2	albedo: 0.124	catalog; MPC; JPL
(523723) 2014 MY_{69}	2014	F51	Pan-STARRS 1	329	cubewano (hot)?	40.4	0.05	17	38.3	42.5	albedo: 0.079	catalog; MPC; JPL
(523724) 2014 MA_{70}	2014	F51	Pan-STARRS 1	302	cubewano (cold)	43.5	0.08	4	40.0	47.0	albedo: 0.152	catalog; MPC; JPL
(523725) 2014 MC_{70}	2014	F51	Pan-STARRS 1	224	res · 6:11	45.0	0.12	8	39.4	50.6	albedo: 0.126	catalog; MPC; JPL
(523726) 2014 MJ_{70}	2014	F51	Pan-STARRS 1	219	SDO	121.9	0.69	16	37.7	206.2	albedo: 0.124	catalog; MPC; JPL
(523730) 2014 OH_{394}	2014	F51	Pan-STARRS 1	297	cubewano (hot)?	45.7	0.16	10	38.2	53.2	albedo: 0.079	catalog; MPC; JPL
(523731) 2014 OK394	1995	691	Spacewatch	212	res · 3:5	42.7	0.17	4	35.5	49.8	albedo: 0.126	catalog; MPC; JPL
(523733) 2014 PR_{70}	2014	F51	Pan-STARRS 1	47	centaur	72.1	0.80	8	14.4	129.8	albedo: 0.058	catalog; MPC; JPL
(523734) 2014 QV_{441}	2014	F51	Pan-STARRS 1	100	centaur	31.9	0.41	27	18.8	45.1	albedo: 0.058	catalog; MPC; JPL
(523735) 2014 QX_{441}	2014	F51	Pan-STARRS 1	298	other TNO	38.6	0.04	26	37.0	40.2	albedo: 0.13	catalog; MPC; JPL
(523736) 2014 QA_{442}	2010	809	D. L. Rabinowitz, M. E. Schwamb, S. Tourtellotte	439	cubewano (hot)?	43.3	0.19	27	35.2	51.4	albedo: 0.079	catalog; MPC; JPL
(523738) 2014 SH_{349}	2014	F51	Pan-STARRS 1	414	cubewano (hot)?	43.5	0.15	17	37.0	49.9	albedo: 0.079	catalog; MPC; JPL
(523739) 2014 TZ_{33}	2014	G96	Mount Lemmon Survey	30	centaur	38.5	0.76	86	9.5	67.6	albedo: 0.058	catalog; MPC; JPL
(523741) 2014 TY_{85}	2014	F51	Pan-STARRS 1	175	res · 5:8?	41.4	0.21	19	32.6	50.2	albedo: 0.126	catalog; MPC; JPL
(523742) 2014 TZ_{85}	2014	F51	Pan-STARRS 1	412	res · 4:7	43.9	0.25	15	33.0	54.8	albedo: 0.126	catalog; MPC; JPL
(523743) 2014 TA_{86}	2014	F51	Pan-STARRS 1	231	res · 3:5	42.5	0.11	9	37.9	47.2	albedo: 0.126	catalog; MPC; JPL
(523744) 2014 TC_{86}	2014	F51	Pan-STARRS 1	240	cubewano (cold)	44.4	0.07	1	41.2	47.5	albedo: 0.152	catalog; MPC; JPL
(523745) 2014 TD_{86}	2014	F51	Pan-STARRS 1	304	cubewano (cold)	43.3	0.01	2	43.0	43.6	albedo: 0.152	catalog; MPC; JPL
(523746) 2014 UT_{114}	2014	G96	Mount Lemmon Survey	99	centaur	30.6	0.48	15	15.9	45.3	albedo: 0.058	catalog; MPC; JPL
(523748) 2014 UP_{224}	2014	F51	Pan-STARRS 1	301	cubewano (hot)?	41.1	0.09	18	37.6	44.7	albedo: 0.079	catalog; MPC; JPL
(523749) 2014 UR_{224}	2014	F51	Pan-STARRS 1	285	other TNO	50.9	0.23	11	39.2	62.6	albedo: 0.13	catalog; MPC; JPL
(523750) 2014 US_{224}	2014	F51	Pan-STARRS 1	514	cubewano (hot)	47.1	0.12	11	41.5	52.7	albedo: 0.079	catalog; MPC; JPL
(523751) 2014 UU_{224}	2014	F51	Pan-STARRS 1	188	plutino	39.9	0.23	15	30.6	49.2	albedo: 0.074	catalog; MPC; JPL
(523752) 2014 VU_{37}	2014	F51	Pan-STARRS 1	491	cubewano (hot)?	41.0	0.04	29	39.3	42.6	albedo: 0.079	catalog; MPC; JPL
(523753) 2014 WV_{508}	2014	F51	Pan-STARRS 1	76	centaur	54.7	0.72	21	15.6	93.8	albedo: 0.058	catalog; MPC; JPL
(523755) 2014 WZ_{508}	2011	G96	Mount Lemmon Survey	145	centaur	78.1	0.70	24	23.4	132.9	albedo: 0.058	catalog; MPC; JPL
(523756) 2014 WD_{509}	2014	F51	Pan-STARRS 1	176	cubewano (cold)	44.1	0.06	1	41.7	46.6	binary: 125 km; albedo: 0.152	catalog; MPC; JPL
(523757) 2014 WH_{509}	2014	F51	Pan-STARRS 1	456	cubewano (hot)?	44.4	0.18	18	36.4	52.4	albedo: 0.079	catalog; MPC; JPL
(523758) 2014 WJ_{509}	2014	F51	Pan-STARRS 1	364	cubewano (hot)?	43.2	0.14	21	37.0	49.3	albedo: 0.079	catalog; MPC; JPL
(523759) 2014 WK_{509}	2014	F51	Pan-STARRS 1	500	other TNO	51.4	0.21	15	40.7	62.2	albedo: 0.13	catalog; MPC; JPL
(523760) 2014 WQ_{509}	2014	F51	Pan-STARRS 1	357	plutino	39.6	0.14	10	34.1	45.0	albedo: 0.074	catalog; MPC; JPL
(523761) 2014 WU_{509}	2014	F51	Pan-STARRS 1	298	cubewano (hot)?	41.8	0.08	20	38.7	45.0	albedo: 0.079	catalog; MPC; JPL
(523762) 2014 WX_{509}	2014	F51	Pan-STARRS 1	277	cubewano (hot)?	42.9	0.15	12	36.5	49.3	albedo: 0.079	catalog; MPC; JPL
(523763) 2014 WZ_{509}	2014	F51	Pan-STARRS 1	294	other TNO	40.4	0.09	16	36.8	44.0	albedo: 0.13	catalog; MPC; JPL
(523764) 2014 WC510	2014	F51	Pan-STARRS 1	181	plutino	39.8	0.26	20	29.6	50.1	binary: 138 km; albedo: 0.051	catalog; MPC; JPL
(523765) 2014 WD_{510}	2011	F51	Pan-STARRS 1	249	SDO	58.9	0.35	19	38.3	79.5	albedo: 0.124	catalog; MPC; JPL
(523766) 2014 WF_{510}	2014	F51	Pan-STARRS 1	195	plutino	39.8	0.23	26	30.7	48.8	albedo: 0.074	catalog; MPC; JPL
(523767) 2014 WH_{510}	2014	F51	Pan-STARRS 1	195	SDO	77.8	0.58	19	32.7	122.9	albedo: 0.124	catalog; MPC; JPL
(523768) 2014 WQ_{510}	2014	F51	Pan-STARRS 1	369	plutino	39.6	0.16	23	33.4	45.8	albedo: 0.074	catalog; MPC; JPL
(523769) 2014 WS_{510}	2014	F51	Pan-STARRS 1	300	res · 2:5	55.7	0.38	9	34.6	76.8	albedo: 0.126	catalog; MPC; JPL
(523770) 2014 XO_{40}	2014	F51	Pan-STARRS 1	142	centaur	57.9	0.72	27	16.2	99.6	albedo: 0.058	catalog; MPC; JPL
(523771) 2014 XP_{40}	2014	F51	Pan-STARRS 1	216	centaur	103.0	0.73	12	27.8	178.2	albedo: 0.058	catalog; MPC; JPL
(523772) 2014 XR_{40}	2014	F51	Pan-STARRS 1	447	cubewano (hot)?	42.9	0.14	25	36.9	48.9	albedo: 0.079	catalog; MPC; JPL
(523773) 2014 XS_{40}	2014	F51	Pan-STARRS 1	419	cubewano (hot)?	42.7	0.17	28	35.4	50.0	albedo: 0.079	catalog; MPC; JPL
(523774) 2014 XV_{40}	2014	F51	Pan-STARRS 1	241	SDO	61.3	0.43	36	35.1	87.5	albedo: 0.124	catalog; MPC; JPL
(523776) 2014 YB_{50}	2014	F51	Pan-STARRS 1	301	cubewano (hot)?	41.8	0.10	29	37.7	46.0	albedo: 0.079	catalog; MPC; JPL
(523777) 2014 YF_{50}	2014	F51	Pan-STARRS 1	318	SDO	80.4	0.56	18	35.7	125.2	albedo: 0.124	catalog; MPC; JPL
(523778) 2014 YK_{50}	2014	F51	Pan-STARRS 1	256	SDO	118.0	0.67	30	39.0	197.1	albedo: 0.124	catalog; MPC; JPL
(523780) 2015 AN_{281}	2015	F51	Pan-STARRS 1	439	cubewano (hot)?	41.9	0.14	18	36.1	47.8	albedo: 0.079	catalog; MPC; JPL
(523787) 2015 DV_{224}	2015	F51	Pan-STARRS 1	162	centaur	56.5	0.61	30	22.0	91.1	albedo: 0.058	catalog; MPC; JPL
(523789) 2015 FN_{345}	2015	F51	Pan-STARRS 1	276	cubewano (hot)?	41.7	0.09	28	37.9	45.4	albedo: 0.079	catalog; MPC; JPL
(523793) 2015 OV_{79}	2015	F51	Pan-STARRS 1	302	cubewano (hot)?	40.6	0.09	30	36.9	44.2	albedo: 0.079	catalog; MPC; JPL
(523794) 2015 RR245	2010	F51	Pan-STARRS 1	525	res · 2:9	82.7	0.59	8	33.9	131.5	binary: 289 km; albedo: 0.126	catalog; MPC; JPL
(523797) 2016 NM_{56}	2016	F51	Pan-STARRS 1	28	centaur	73.3	0.86	144	10.6	135.9	albedo: 0.058	catalog; MPC; JPL
(523798) 2017 CX_{33}	2017	F51	Pan-STARRS 1	33	centaur	73.4	0.86	72	10.4	136.3	albedo: 0.058	catalog; MPC; JPL
(523800) 2017 KZ_{31}	2016	F51	Pan-STARRS 1	47	centaur	53.3	0.80	162	10.9	95.7	albedo: 0.058	catalog; MPC; JPL
(523899) 1997 CV_{29}	1997	568	Chen, J., Trujillo, C. A., Jewitt, D. C., Luu, J. X.	159	cubewano (hot)	42.2	0.05	8	40.2	44.3	albedo: 0.079; BRmag: 1.86	catalog; MPC; JPL
(523955) 1998 UU_{43}	1998	695	Buie, M. W.	134	res · 3:4	36.7	0.13	10	31.9	41.6	albedo: 0.126; BRmag: 1.49; taxonomy: IR-RR	catalog; MPC; JPL
(523965) 1998 XY_{95}	1998	950	Fitzsimmons, A., Fletcher, E.	209	SDO	65.0	0.43	7	37.3	92.7	albedo: 0.124; BRmag: 1.58; taxonomy: RR	catalog; MPC; JPL
(523983) 1999 RY_{214}	1999	568	Jewitt, D. C., Luu, J. X., Trujillo, C. A.	136	cubewano (hot)?	45.5	0.18	14	37.1	53.9	binary: 82 km; albedo: 0.079; BRmag: 1.26; taxonomy: BR-IR	catalog; MPC; JPL
(524049) 2000 CQ_{105}	2000	695	Buie, M. W.	220	SDO	57.1	0.39	20	34.7	79.4	albedo: 0.124; BRmag: 1.11; taxonomy: BB-BR	catalog; MPC; JPL
(524179) 2001 FQ_{185}	2001	695	Buie, M. W.	157	twotino	47.5	0.23	3	36.7	58.2	albedo: 0.126; BRmag: 1.86; taxonomy: RR	catalog; MPC; JPL
(524216) 2001 RU_{143}	2001	695	Buie, M. W.	270	plutino	39.6	0.14	7	33.9	45.3	albedo: 0.074	catalog; MPC; JPL
(524217) 2001 RZ_{143}	2001	695	Buie, M. W.	108	cubewano (cold)	44.4	0.07	2	41.3	47.4	binary: 90 km; albedo: 0.191; BRmag: 1.59	catalog; MPC; JPL
(524365) 2001 XQ_{254}	2001	568	Jewitt, D. C., Sheppard, S. S., Kleyna, J.	99	res · 2:5	55.8	0.44	7	31.0	80.6	albedo: 0.126; BRmag: 1.21; taxonomy: BR	catalog; MPC; JPL
(524366) 2001 XR254	2001	568	Jewitt, D. C., Sheppard, S. S., Kleyna, J.	171	cubewano (cold)	43.2	0.03	1	41.9	44.4	binary: 140 km; albedo: 0.136	catalog; MPC; JPL
(524435) 2002 CY_{248}	2002	695	Buie, M. W.	391	cubewano (hot)	46.4	0.14	7	39.8	52.9	albedo: 0.079	catalog; MPC; JPL
(524457) 2002 FW_{6}	2002	568	Gladman, B., Kavelaars, J. J., Doressoundiram, A.	109	res · 3:4	36.3	0.12	4	31.9	40.7	albedo: 0.126	catalog; MPC; JPL
(524460) 2002 GF_{32}	2002	807	Buie, M. W.	254	plutino	39.1	0.18	3	32.1	46.2	albedo: 0.074; BRmag: 1.76; taxonomy: RR	catalog; MPC; JPL
(524531) 2002 XH_{91}	2002	695	Buie, M. W.	216	cubewano (cold)	44.2	0.08	5	40.5	47.9	binary: 133 km; albedo: 0.14	catalog; MPC; JPL
(524612) 2003 QA_{112}	2003	807	Buie, M. W.	270	cubewano (hot)?	42.7	0.12	16	37.7	47.7	albedo: 0.079	catalog; MPC; JPL
(524613) 2003 QW_{113}	2003	568	Mauna Kea	196	centaur	51.4	0.49	7	26.3	76.6	albedo: 0.058	catalog; MPC; JPL
(524747) 2003 UJ_{292}	2003	695	Deep Ecliptic Survey	159	SDO	56.3	0.33	11	38.0	74.6	albedo: 0.124	catalog; MPC; JPL
(524834) 2003 YL_{179}	2003	568	Mauna Kea	115	cubewano (cold)	39.1	0.01	3	38.7	39.4	albedo: 0.152; BRmag: 1.26	catalog; MPC; JPL
(525257) 2004 VS_{75}	2004	695	Buie, M. W.	160	res · 5:9	44.7	0.10	7	40.2	49.3	albedo: 0.126	catalog; MPC; JPL
(525258) 2004 VT_{75}	2004	695	Buie, M. W.	266	plutino	39.5	0.21	13	31.3	47.7	albedo: 0.074	catalog; MPC; JPL
(525460) 2005 EX_{297}	2005	695	Buie, M. W.	181	cubewano (cold)	44.1	0.11	5	39.2	48.9	albedo: 0.152	catalog; MPC; JPL
(525461) 2005 EN_{302}	2005	695	Buie, M. W.	137	cubewano (cold)	44.9	0.09	3	41.0	48.7	albedo: 0.152	catalog; MPC; JPL
(525462) 2005 EO_{304}	2005	695	Buie, M. W.	152	cubewano (cold)	45.5	0.07	3	42.5	48.5	binary: 78 km; albedo: 0.15	catalog; MPC; JPL
(525595) 2005 JP_{179}	2005	807	Buie, M. W.	175	cubewano (cold)	42.8	0.03	2	41.6	44.0	albedo: 0.152	catalog; MPC; JPL
(525596) 2005 JR_{179}	2005	807	Buie, M. W.	162	cubewano (cold)	46.7	0.12	4	41.2	52.2	albedo: 0.152	catalog; MPC; JPL
(525729) 2005 RQ_{43}	2005	705	Becker, A. C., Puckett, A. W., Kubica, J.	249	cubewano (hot)?	41.6	0.10	20	37.7	45.6	albedo: 0.079	catalog; MPC; JPL
(525815) 2005 SD_{278}	2005	705	Becker, A. C., Puckett, A. W., Kubica, J.	207	res · 2:5?	56.0	0.29	18	40.0	72.0	albedo: 0.126; BRmag: 1.53; taxonomy: IR	catalog; MPC; JPL
(525816) 2005 SF_{278}	2005	705	Becker, A. C., Puckett, A. W., Kubica, J.	130	res · 4:7	44.1	0.19	13	35.5	52.7	binary: 114 km; albedo: 0.126; BRmag: 2; taxonomy: RR	catalog; MPC; JPL
(527603) 2007 VJ305	2007	705	Becker, A. C., Puckett, A. W., Kubica, J.	160	SDO	197.7	0.82	12	35.3	360.1	albedo: 0.124; BRmag: 1.44; taxonomy: IR	catalog; MPC; JPL
(527604) 2007 VL305	2007	705	Becker, A. C. , Puckett, A. W., Kubica, J.	112	nep trj	30.2	0.07	28	28.2	32.3	albedo: 0.058; BRmag: 1.24	catalog; MPC; JPL
(528219) 2008 KV42	2008	568	Mauna Kea	102	centaur	41.6	0.49	103	21.1	62.0	albedo: 0.058; BRmag: 1.29; taxonomy: BR	catalog; MPC; JPL
(528381) 2008 ST291	2008	675	Schwamb, M. E., Brown, M. E., Rabinowitz, D. L.	534	res 1:6	99.7	0.57	21	42.7	156.8	albedo: 0.126	catalog; MPC; JPL
(529780) 2010 MQ_{116}	2010	F51	Pan-STARRS 1	323	res · 3:5?	42.3	0.18	31	34.8	49.7	albedo: 0.126	catalog; MPC; JPL
(529823) 2010 PP_{81}	2010	F51	Pan-STARRS 1	163	SDO	52.6	0.28	31	37.8	67.5	albedo: 0.124	catalog; MPC; JPL
(529938) 2010 TM_{182}	2010	F51	Pan-STARRS 1	192	plutino	39.8	0.17	6	32.9	46.6	albedo: 0.074	catalog; MPC; JPL
(529940) 2010 TB_{192}	2010	F51	Pan-STARRS 1	194	SDO	55.0	0.32	13	37.3	72.7	albedo: 0.124	catalog; MPC; JPL
(530055) 2010 VW_{224}	2010	F51	Pan-STARRS 1	292	res · 4:7?	44.1	0.13	9	38.3	49.9	albedo: 0.126	catalog; MPC; JPL
(530231) 2011 BV_{163}	2011	F51	Pan-STARRS 1	159	cubewano (cold)	44.4	0.11	5	39.6	49.1	albedo: 0.152	catalog; MPC; JPL
(530664) 2011 SO_{277}	2011	F51	Pan-STARRS 1	158	nep trj	30.3	0.01	10	30.2	30.5	albedo: 0.058; BRmag: 1.08	catalog; MPC; JPL
(530838) 2011 UC_{411}	2011	568	M. Alexandersen, B. J. Gladman, J. J. Kavelaars	121	plutino	39.6	0.28	5	28.7	50.5	albedo: 0.074	catalog; MPC; JPL
(530839) 2011 UK_{411}	2010	568	Pan-STARRS 1	155	res · 3:5	42.7	0.24	13	32.5	52.9	albedo: 0.126	catalog; MPC; JPL
(530930) 2011 WG_{157}	2011	F51	Pan-STARRS 1	194	nep trj	30.2	0.03	22	29.4	31.0	albedo: 0.058; BRmag: 1.12	catalog; MPC; JPL
(530941) 2011 XJ_{4}	2011	F51	Pan-STARRS 1	196	cubewano (hot)?	45.6	0.19	11	36.8	54.4	albedo: 0.079	catalog; MPC; JPL
(530955) 2011 YN_{79}	2011	F51	Pan-STARRS 1	230	SDO	74.2	0.47	26	39.4	109.1	albedo: 0.124	catalog; MPC; JPL
(531015) 2012 BX_{154}	2012	F51	Pan-STARRS 1	200	SDO	74.0	0.50	10	37.2	110.7	albedo: 0.124	catalog; MPC; JPL
(531016) 2012 BZ_{154}	2012	F51	Pan-STARRS 1	143	SDO	77.8	0.54	26	36.1	119.6	albedo: 0.124	catalog; MPC; JPL
(531017) 2012 BA_{155}	2012	F51	Pan-STARRS 1	228	res · 2:5	55.4	0.38	14	34.6	76.3	albedo: 0.126	catalog; MPC; JPL
(531040) 2012 CS_{57}	2012	F51	Pan-STARRS 1	249	cubewano (hot)?	43.5	0.03	17	42.0	44.9	albedo: 0.079	catalog; MPC; JPL
(531074) 2012 DX_{98}	2012	F51	Pan-STARRS 1	128	twotino	47.8	0.27	13	35.1	60.6	albedo: 0.126	catalog; MPC; JPL
(531075) 2012 DY_{98}	2012	F51	Pan-STARRS 1	133	SDO	70.3	0.50	19	35.1	105.6	albedo: 0.124	catalog; MPC; JPL
(531076) 2012 DA_{99}	2012	F51	Pan-STARRS 1	147	cubewano (cold)	42.8	0.03	3	41.3	44.2	albedo: 0.152	catalog; MPC; JPL
(531077) 2012 DB_{99}	2012	F51	Pan-STARRS 1	259	plutino	39.4	0.19	10	31.9	47.0	albedo: 0.074	catalog; MPC; JPL
(531141) 2012 FK_{84}	2012	F51	Pan-STARRS 1	238	cubewano (hot)?	46.3	0.16	17	38.9	53.8	albedo: 0.079	catalog; MPC; JPL
(531142) 2012 FL_{84}	2012	F51	Pan-STARRS 1	166	SDO	103.4	0.63	26	38.5	168.3	albedo: 0.124	catalog; MPC; JPL
(531224) 2012 HK_{85}	2012	F51	Pan-STARRS 1	162	SDO	57.3	0.33	5	38.2	76.4	albedo: 0.124	catalog; MPC; JPL
(531682) 2012 UB_{178}	2012	F51	Pan-STARRS 1	289	cubewano (hot)	42.9	0.11	9	38.3	47.6	albedo: 0.079	catalog; MPC; JPL
(531683) 2012 UC_{178}	2010	F51	Pan-STARRS 1	162	res · 3:5	42.5	0.17	3	35.4	49.7	albedo: 0.126	catalog; MPC; JPL
(531684) 2012 UE_{178}	2010	F51	Pan-STARRS 1	193	cubewano (cold)	44.0	0.05	4	42.1	46.0	albedo: 0.152	catalog; MPC; JPL
(531917) 2013 BN_{82}	2013	F51	Pan-STARRS 1	173	res · 4:7	43.9	0.21	7	34.5	53.3	albedo: 0.126	catalog; MPC; JPL
(532026) 2013 EC_{138}	2013	695	Research and Education Collaborative Occultation Network	293	cubewano (hot)?	47.7	0.14	8	41.0	54.3	albedo: 0.079	catalog; MPC; JPL
(532027) 2013 EH_{154}	2013	F51	Pan-STARRS 1	144	centaur	31.7	0.19	8	25.6	37.9	albedo: 0.058	catalog; MPC; JPL
532037 Chiminigagua	2013	W84	Sheppard, S. S., Trujillo, C.	742	SDO	58.8	0.39	33	35.8	81.9	binary: 186 km; albedo: 0.17	catalog; MPC; JPL
(532038) 2013 FB_{28}	2013	W84	Sheppard, S. S., Trujillo, C.	289	cubewano (hot)?	45.8	0.07	16	42.8	48.8	albedo: 0.079	catalog; MPC; JPL
(532039) 2013 FR_{28}	2013	F51	Pan-STARRS 1	123	res · 4:7	43.6	0.24	3	33.1	54.0	albedo: 0.126	catalog; MPC; JPL
(532092) 2013 HU_{156}	2013	F51	Pan-STARRS 1	393	plutino	39.4	0.12	21	34.5	44.2	albedo: 0.074	catalog; MPC; JPL
(532093) 2013 HV_{156}	2013	F51	Pan-STARRS 1	421	cubewano (hot)?	47.1	0.18	18	38.8	55.4	albedo: 0.079	catalog; MPC; JPL
(532095) 2013 HY_{156}	2013	F51	Pan-STARRS 1	199	cubewano (hot)?	40.7	0.06	21	38.3	43.1	albedo: 0.079	catalog; MPC; JPL
(532184) 2013 OR_{11}	2013	F51	Pan-STARRS 1	193	centaur	80.6	0.63	21	29.9	131.3	albedo: 0.058	catalog; MPC; JPL
(533028) 2014 AL_{55}	2014	F51	Pan-STARRS 1	175	res · 4:7	43.9	0.25	4	32.9	54.9	albedo: 0.126	catalog; MPC; JPL
(533085) 2014 BW_{64}	2014	F51	Pan-STARRS 1	181	other TNO	46.1	0.34	16	30.3	62.0	albedo: 0.13	catalog; MPC; JPL
(533205) 2014 DD_{143}	2014	F51	Pan-STARRS 1	194	cubewano (cold)	43.8	0.02	2	43.0	44.7	albedo: 0.152	catalog; MPC; JPL
(533206) 2014 DE_{143}	2014	F51	Pan-STARRS 1	301	cubewano (hot)	43.2	0.01	7	42.7	43.8	albedo: 0.079	catalog; MPC; JPL
(533207) 2014 DJ_{143}	2014	F51	Pan-STARRS 1	181	other TNO	37.8	0.02	7	37.1	38.4	albedo: 0.13	catalog; MPC; JPL
(533208) 2014 DQ_{143}	2014	F51	Pan-STARRS 1	146	SDO	77.7	0.54	26	35.5	119.9	albedo: 0.124	catalog; MPC; JPL
(533209) 2014 DR_{143}	2014	F51	Pan-STARRS 1	332	plutino	39.3	0.29	10	27.7	50.9	albedo: 0.074	catalog; MPC; JPL
(533210) 2014 DT_{143}	2014	F51	Pan-STARRS 1	154	SDO	101.3	0.65	26	35.9	166.8	albedo: 0.124	catalog; MPC; JPL
(533211) 2014 DU_{143}	2014	F51	Pan-STARRS 1	173	res · 3:4	36.5	0.13	14	31.6	41.4	albedo: 0.126	catalog; MPC; JPL
(533397) 2014 GZ_{53}	2014	F51	Pan-STARRS 1	255	cubewano (hot)	43.7	0.03	6	42.3	45.2	albedo: 0.079	catalog; MPC; JPL
(533398) 2014 GA_{54}	2014	F51	Pan-STARRS 1	134	res · 5:8	40.8	0.24	16	31.0	50.7	albedo: 0.126	catalog; MPC; JPL
(533506) 2014 HU_{199}	2014	F51	Pan-STARRS 1	240	cubewano (hot)	43.0	0.07	9	40.2	45.9	albedo: 0.079	catalog; MPC; JPL
(533507) 2014 HV_{199}	2014	F51	Pan-STARRS 1	191	other TNO	37.7	0.02	25	36.9	38.5	albedo: 0.13	catalog; MPC; JPL
(533508) 2014 HC_{200}	2014	F51	Pan-STARRS 1	200	SDO	65.0	0.43	36	37.4	92.6	albedo: 0.124	catalog; MPC; JPL
(533560) 2014 JM_{80}	2014	F51	Pan-STARRS 1	262	SDO	61.9	0.26	21	46.0	77.9	albedo: 0.124	catalog; MPC; JPL
(533561) 2014 JN_{80}	2014	F51	Pan-STARRS 1	224	cubewano (hot)?	41.2	0.10	18	37.0	45.4	albedo: 0.079	catalog; MPC; JPL
(533562) 2014 JQ_{80}	2014	F51	Pan-STARRS 1	165	plutino	39.2	0.22	8	30.8	47.7	albedo: 0.074	catalog; MPC; JPL
(533563) 2014 JW_{80}	2014	F51	Pan-STARRS 1	260	SDO	137.8	0.72	41	38.0	237.6	albedo: 0.124	catalog; MPC; JPL
(533676) 2014 LS_{28}	2014	F51	Pan-STARRS 1	195	cubewano (cold)	43.1	0.06	4	40.5	45.7	albedo: 0.152	catalog; MPC; JPL
(533704) 2014 MZ_{69}	2014	F51	Pan-STARRS 1	277	cubewano (hot)?	46.0	0.19	13	37.1	54.9	albedo: 0.079	catalog; MPC; JPL
(533868) 2014 OG_{394}	2014	F51	Pan-STARRS 1	201	other TNO	39.0	0.05	4	36.9	41.1	albedo: 0.13	catalog; MPC; JPL
(534073) 2014 QL_{441}	2014	W84	DECam	187	SDO	49.1	0.26	26	36.1	62.0	albedo: 0.124	catalog; MPC; JPL
(534074) 2014 QZ_{441}	2014	F51	Pan-STARRS 1	234	res · 3:5	42.5	0.08	7	39.0	45.9	albedo: 0.126	catalog; MPC; JPL
(534161) 2014 RQ_{63}	2014	F51	Pan-STARRS 1	166	plutino	39.6	0.20	10	31.7	47.6	albedo: 0.074	catalog; MPC; JPL
(534314) 2014 SJ_{349}	2014	F51	Pan-STARRS 1	137	res · 3:5	42.6	0.17	9	35.3	49.9	albedo: 0.126	catalog; MPC; JPL
(534315) 2014 SK_{349}	2014	F51	Pan-STARRS 1	130	plutino	39.8	0.29	9	28.1	51.5	albedo: 0.074	catalog; MPC; JPL
(534405) 2014 TW_{85}	2014	F51	Pan-STARRS 1	209	cubewano (cold)	43.2	0.02	1	42.4	44.1	albedo: 0.152	catalog; MPC; JPL
(534625) 2014 UQ_{224}	2014	F51	Pan-STARRS 1	224	cubewano (cold)	44.8	0.04	2	42.8	46.7	binary: 141 km; albedo: 0.152	catalog; MPC; JPL
(534626) 2014 UT_{224}	2014	F51	Pan-STARRS 1	174	twotino	48.4	0.27	4	35.3	61.6	albedo: 0.126	catalog; MPC; JPL
(534627) 2014 UV_{224}	2014	F51	Pan-STARRS 1	214	res · 3:11	72.8	0.53	4	34.0	111.5	albedo: 0.126	catalog; MPC; JPL
(534631) 2014 UX_{229}	2014	568	Outer Solar System Origins Survey	81	plutino	40.0	0.34	16	26.4	53.5	albedo: 0.074	catalog; MPC; JPL
(535017) 2014 WY_{508}	2014	F51	Pan-STARRS 1	170	centaur	100.4	0.71	21	28.8	172.1	albedo: 0.058	catalog; MPC; JPL
(535018) 2014 WA_{509}	2014	F51	Pan-STARRS 1	207	cubewano (cold)	44.1	0.06	3	41.5	46.7	albedo: 0.152	catalog; MPC; JPL
(535019) 2014 WE_{509}	2014	F51	Pan-STARRS 1	133	res · 3:4	36.5	0.09	14	33.1	39.9	albedo: 0.126	catalog; MPC; JPL
(535020) 2014 WG_{509}	2014	F51	Pan-STARRS 1	326	cubewano (hot)?	42.8	0.08	21	39.5	46.2	albedo: 0.079	catalog; MPC; JPL
(535021) 2014 WL_{509}	2014	F51	Pan-STARRS 1	289	cubewano (hot)?	41.6	0.13	15	36.3	46.9	albedo: 0.079	catalog; MPC; JPL
(535022) 2014 WN_{509}	2014	F51	Pan-STARRS 1	211	res · 3:5?	42.4	0.05	7	40.2	44.6	albedo: 0.126	catalog; MPC; JPL
(535023) 2014 WO_{509}	2013	695	Research and Education Collaborative Occultation Network	192	cubewano (cold)	44.1	0.10	4	39.9	48.2	albedo: 0.152	catalog; MPC; JPL
(535024) 2014 WR_{509}	2014	F51	Pan-STARRS 1	173	plutino	39.7	0.35	26	25.8	53.6	albedo: 0.074	catalog; MPC; JPL
(535025) 2014 WT_{509}	2014	F51	Pan-STARRS 1	134	twotino	48.0	0.26	12	35.5	60.4	albedo: 0.126	catalog; MPC; JPL
(535026) 2014 WV_{509}	2014	F51	Pan-STARRS 1	212	cubewano (hot)?	47.1	0.18	25	38.5	55.6	albedo: 0.079	catalog; MPC; JPL
(535027) 2014 WY_{509}	2014	F51	Pan-STARRS 1	318	cubewano (hot)?	44.1	0.17	12	36.6	51.6	albedo: 0.079	catalog; MPC; JPL
(535028) 2014 WA_{510}	2015	568	D. J. Tholen, C. A. Trujillo, S. S. Sheppard	220	cubewano (cold)	45.5	0.04	2	43.6	47.4	albedo: 0.152	catalog; MPC; JPL
(535029) 2014 WG_{510}	2014	F51	Pan-STARRS 1	223	plutino	39.5	0.21	18	31.0	47.9	albedo: 0.074	catalog; MPC; JPL
(535030) 2014 WJ_{510}	2014	F51	Pan-STARRS 1	175	SDO	68.7	0.49	24	34.8	102.6	albedo: 0.124	catalog; MPC; JPL
(535031) 2014 WL_{510}	2014	F51	Pan-STARRS 1	190	SDO	63.9	0.44	5	35.7	92.0	albedo: 0.124	catalog; MPC; JPL
(535032) 2014 WP_{510}	2014	F51	Pan-STARRS 1	163	plutino	39.8	0.18	8	32.6	47.0	albedo: 0.074	catalog; MPC; JPL
(535167) 2014 XT_{40}	2014	F51	Pan-STARRS 1	174	plutino	39.7	0.20	7	31.9	47.5	albedo: 0.074	catalog; MPC; JPL
(535168) 2014 XU_{40}	2014	F51	Pan-STARRS 1	180	plutino	39.8	0.18	5	32.6	47.0	albedo: 0.074	catalog; MPC; JPL
(535169) 2014 XX_{40}	2014	F51	Pan-STARRS 1	130	SDO	80.6	0.60	20	32.2	128.9	albedo: 0.124	catalog; MPC; JPL
(535228) 2014 YE_{50}	2014	F51	Pan-STARRS 1	304	SDO	59.9	0.38	27	37.0	82.9	albedo: 0.124	catalog; MPC; JPL
(535229) 2014 YG_{50}	2014	F51	Pan-STARRS 1	175	plutino	39.7	0.20	19	31.7	47.6	albedo: 0.074	catalog; MPC; JPL
(535230) 2014 YH_{50}	2014	F51	Pan-STARRS 1	215	SDO	57.1	0.33	41	38.6	75.7	albedo: 0.124	catalog; MPC; JPL
(535231) 2014 YJ_{50}	2014	F51	Pan-STARRS 1	210	plutino	39.7	0.20	7	31.7	47.7	albedo: 0.074	catalog; MPC; JPL
(535466) 2015 AK_{281}	2015	F51	Pan-STARRS 1	202	cubewano (hot)?	43.0	0.22	17	33.5	52.4	albedo: 0.079	catalog; MPC; JPL
(535986) 2015 BN_{518}	2015	F51	Pan-STARRS 1	202	cubewano (hot)?	46.7	0.23	23	36.1	57.3	albedo: 0.079	catalog; MPC; JPL
(535987) 2015 BO_{518}	2015	F51	Pan-STARRS 1	202	cubewano (hot)?	46.6	0.23	8	35.8	57.5	albedo: 0.079	catalog; MPC; JPL
(535988) 2015 BU_{518}	2015	F51	Pan-STARRS 1	118	res · 4:7?	43.6	0.27	11	31.7	55.5	albedo: 0.126	catalog; MPC; JPL
(535989) 2015 BV_{518}	2015	F51	Pan-STARRS 1	246	cubewano (cold)	45.0	0.04	2	43.4	46.6	albedo: 0.152	catalog; MPC; JPL
(535990) 2015 BW_{518}	2015	F51	Pan-STARRS 1	217	cubewano (hot)	45.1	0.16	9	38.0	52.3	albedo: 0.079	catalog; MPC; JPL
(535991) 2015 BD_{519}	2015	F51	Pan-STARRS 1	236	res · 2:5	55.4	0.35	10	36.3	74.6	albedo: 0.126	catalog; MPC; JPL
(535992) 2015 BF_{519}	2015	F51	Pan-STARRS 1	106	other TNO	39.3	0.32	19	26.6	51.9	albedo: 0.13	catalog; MPC; JPL
(535993) 2015 BG_{519}	2015	F51	Pan-STARRS 1	192	other TNO	38.9	0.03	34	37.9	40.0	albedo: 0.13	catalog; MPC; JPL
(535994) 2015 BH_{519}	2015	F51	Pan-STARRS 1	207	SDO	53.5	0.32	28	36.3	70.7	albedo: 0.124	catalog; MPC; JPL
(536287) 2015 CL_{62}	2015	F51	Pan-STARRS 1	240	cubewano (hot)?	41.8	0.14	19	35.9	47.7	albedo: 0.079	catalog; MPC; JPL
(536919) 2015 FL_{345}	2015	F51	Pan-STARRS 1	315	cubewano (hot)	45.7	0.12	5	40.0	51.4	albedo: 0.079	catalog; MPC; JPL
(536920) 2015 FM_{345}	2015	F51	Pan-STARRS 1	265	cubewano (hot)?	42.5	0.03	17	41.1	43.8	albedo: 0.079	catalog; MPC; JPL
(536921) 2015 FO_{345}	2014	F51	Pan-STARRS 1	137	other TNO	40.0	0.13	20	34.8	45.2	albedo: 0.13	catalog; MPC; JPL
(536922) 2015 FP_{345}	2015	F51	Pan-STARRS 1	160	res · 4:7	43.6	0.22	10	34.1	53.1	albedo: 0.126	catalog; MPC; JPL
(538690) 2016 FP_{59}	2016	W84	DECam	232	cubewano (cold)	46.6	0.16	4	39.0	54.2	albedo: 0.152	catalog; MPC; JPL
(538691) 2016 FW_{59}	2016	W84	DECam	282	cubewano (hot)	43.3	0.07	6	40.4	46.3	albedo: 0.079	catalog; MPC; JPL
541132 Leleākūhonua	2015	T09	Tholen, D. J., Trujillo, C. A., Sheppard, S. S.	220	sednoid	1418.6	0.95	12	64.7	2772.5	albedo: 0.21	catalog; MPC; JPL
(542258) 2013 AP_{183}	2013	F51	Pan-STARRS 1	281	res · 3:8	58.4	0.37	3	36.6	80.2	albedo: 0.126	catalog; MPC; JPL
(542889) 2013 MY_{11}	2013	F51	Pan-STARRS 1	109	centaur	52.0	0.59	15	21.5	82.4	albedo: 0.058	catalog; MPC; JPL
(543354) 2014 AN_{55}	2014	F51	Pan-STARRS 1	507	SDO	56.3	0.39	9	34.6	78.0	albedo: 0.124	catalog; MPC; JPL
(543375) 2014 BX_{64}	2014	F51	Pan-STARRS 1	330	cubewano (hot)	42.0	0.05	11	40.0	44.1	albedo: 0.079	catalog; MPC; JPL
(543376) 2014 BE_{70}	2014	F51	Pan-STARRS 1	243	SDO	105.3	0.63	25	39.1	171.5	albedo: 0.124	catalog; MPC; JPL
(543377) 2014 BF_{70}	2014	F51	Pan-STARRS 1	70	centaur	89.2	0.87	11	11.6	166.8	albedo: 0.058	catalog; MPC; JPL
(543435) 2014 GC_{54}	2014	F51	Pan-STARRS 1	194	plutino	39.1	0.26	20	29.1	49.1	albedo: 0.074	catalog; MPC; JPL
(543454) 2014 HZ_{199}	2002	644	NEAT	482	cubewano (hot)?	43.0	0.16	28	36.3	49.8	albedo: 0.079	catalog; MPC; JPL
(543733) 2014 OZ_{393}	2014	F51	Pan-STARRS 1	248	cubewano (hot)?	46.6	0.19	17	37.7	55.5	albedo: 0.079	catalog; MPC; JPL
(543734) 2014 OL_{394}	2014	F51	Pan-STARRS 1	104	res · 3:5	42.4	0.27	5	30.8	54.0	albedo: 0.126	catalog; MPC; JPL
(543735) 2014 OS_{394}	2014	F51	Pan-STARRS 1	231	res 1:11?	155.5	0.76	14	37.1	273.9	albedo: 0.126	catalog; MPC; JPL
(544430) 2014 UW_{224}	2014	F51	Pan-STARRS 1	165	res · 2:5	56.1	0.41	3	33.1	79.1	albedo: 0.126	catalog; MPC; JPL
(544977) 2014 WZ_{535}	2014	F51	Pan-STARRS 1	272	cubewano (hot)?	40.9	0.07	20	38.0	43.8	albedo: 0.079	catalog; MPC; JPL
(545293) 2011 FX_{62}	2005	644	NEAT	202	centaur	47.8	0.58	18	20.3	75.2	albedo: 0.058	catalog; MPC; JPL
(545361) 2011 GZ_{61}	2011	809	La Silla	327	cubewano (hot)	42.6	0.11	9	37.8	47.4	albedo: 0.079	catalog; MPC; JPL
(546974) 2010 BP_{153}	2010	F51	Pan-STARRS 1	214	SDO	80.2	0.56	11	35.2	125.3	albedo: 0.124	catalog; MPC; JPL
(547616) 2010 TR_{195}	2010	F51	Pan-STARRS 1	140	plutino	39.8	0.27	18	29.1	50.5	albedo: 0.074	catalog; MPC; JPL
(547617) 2010 TT_{195}	2010	F51	Pan-STARRS 1	308	cubewano (hot)?	43.7	0.08	16	40.4	47.0	albedo: 0.079	catalog; MPC; JPL
(547893) 2010 WN_{75}	2010	F51	Pan-STARRS 1	335	cubewano (hot)?	41.1	0.10	28	36.9	45.3	albedo: 0.079	catalog; MPC; JPL
(548504) 2010 NF_{146}	2010	F51	Pan-STARRS 1	185	cubewano (cold)	43.3	0.00	3	43.2	43.5	albedo: 0.152	catalog; MPC; JPL
(550564) 2012 PU_{45}	2012	F51	Pan-STARRS 1	147	other TNO	43.6	0.29	24	31.1	56.0	albedo: 0.13	catalog; MPC; JPL
(552033) 2013 RO_{98}	2013	W84	Cerro Tololo-DECam	215	SDO	58.2	0.39	19	35.4	81.0	albedo: 0.124	catalog; MPC; JPL
(552474) 2010 AW_{153}	2010	F51	Pan-STARRS 1	84	centaur	43.6	0.54	29	20.1	67.0	albedo: 0.058	catalog; MPC; JPL
(552555) 2010 ER_{65}	2010	809	Rabinowitz, D., Tourtellotte, S.	346	SDO	98.0	0.59	21	40.0	156.1	albedo: 0.124	catalog; MPC; JPL
(552678) 2010 JG_{210}	2010	F51	Pan-STARRS 1	108	centaur	31.6	0.46	27	17.2	46.0	albedo: 0.058	catalog; MPC; JPL
(552679) 2010 JH_{210}	2010	F51	Pan-STARRS 1	179	plutino	39.2	0.24	12	29.9	48.5	albedo: 0.074	catalog; MPC; JPL
(553137) 2011 BM_{170}	2011	F51	Pan-STARRS 1	259	SDO	56.2	0.34	47	37.2	75.2	albedo: 0.124	catalog; MPC; JPL
(553138) 2011 BQ_{170}	2011	F51	Pan-STARRS 1	253	cubewano (hot)	45.9	0.18	9	37.6	54.1	albedo: 0.079	catalog; MPC; JPL
(553893) 2012 BW_{154}	2012	F51	Pan-STARRS 1	365	cubewano (hot)	46.0	0.15	8	39.2	52.8	albedo: 0.079	catalog; MPC; JPL
(553898) 2012 BZ_{159}	2012	F51	Pan-STARRS 1	221	cubewano (hot)	44.9	0.15	7	38.1	51.6	albedo: 0.079	catalog; MPC; JPL
(554000) 2012 FM_{87}	2012	F51	Pan-STARRS 1	213	SDO	51.2	0.25	20	38.1	64.2	albedo: 0.124	catalog; MPC; JPL
(554099) 2012 KU_{50}	2012	809	La Silla	144	other TNO	40.8	0.25	19	30.8	50.9	binary: 144 km; albedo: 0.13	catalog; MPC; JPL
(554102) 2012 KW_{51}	2012	F51	Pan-STARRS 1	194	twotino	47.4	0.23	12	36.4	58.5	albedo: 0.126	catalog; MPC; JPL
(554780) 2013 AQ_{183}	2013	F51	Pan-STARRS 1	147	cubewano (cold)	46.7	0.17	3	38.9	54.5	albedo: 0.152	catalog; MPC; JPL
(554856) 2013 CF_{229}	2013	F51	Pan-STARRS 1	221	twotino	48.1	0.12	9	42.4	53.8	albedo: 0.126	catalog; MPC; JPL
(554982) 2013 JV_{65}	2013	F51	Pan-STARRS 1	185	cubewano (cold)	42.5	0.03	3	41.1	43.9	albedo: 0.152	catalog; MPC; JPL
(555426) 2013 XD_{26}	2013	F51	Pan-STARRS 1	135	other TNO	40.4	0.11	30	36.0	44.8	albedo: 0.13	catalog; MPC; JPL
(555591) 2014 AF_{61}	2014	F51	Pan-STARRS 1	158	cubewano (hot)?	45.6	0.23	28	34.9	56.3	albedo: 0.079	catalog; MPC; JPL
(555632) 2014 BZ_{57}	2014	809	Rabinowitz, D.	488	cubewano (hot)?	42.9	0.14	27	36.9	49.0	albedo: 0.079	catalog; MPC; JPL
(555678) 2014 CO_{23}	2014	F51	Pan-STARRS 1	412	cubewano (hot)?	43.9	0.18	8	36.1	51.7	albedo: 0.079	catalog; MPC; JPL
(555756) 2014 DH_{143}	2014	F51	Pan-STARRS 1	161	res · 3:4	36.4	0.16	5	30.7	42.1	albedo: 0.126	catalog; MPC; JPL
(555757) 2014 DM_{143}	2014	F51	Pan-STARRS 1	347	cubewano (hot)	44.8	0.09	11	40.8	48.8	albedo: 0.079	catalog; MPC; JPL
(555758) 2014 DP_{143}	2014	F51	Pan-STARRS 1	144	plutino	39.3	0.26	24	29.3	49.3	albedo: 0.074	catalog; MPC; JPL
(555820) 2014 EA_{52}	2014	F51	Pan-STARRS 1	397	cubewano (hot)?	41.3	0.09	19	37.4	45.1	albedo: 0.079	catalog; MPC; JPL
(555915) 2014 GX_{53}	2002	F51	NEAT	319	res · 7:11	40.5	0.14	15	35.0	46.0	albedo: 0.126	catalog; MPC; JPL
(555916) 2014 GB_{54}	2014	F51	Pan-STARRS 1	136	plutino	39.2	0.28	26	28.1	50.3	albedo: 0.074	catalog; MPC; JPL
(556004) 2014 HA_{200}	2014	F51	Pan-STARRS 1	436	res · 2:5?	55.4	0.34	10	36.6	74.1	albedo: 0.126	catalog; MPC; JPL
(556067) 2014 JK_{80}	2014	F51	Pan-STARRS 1	265	plutino	39.2	0.20	20	31.5	46.8	albedo: 0.074	catalog; MPC; JPL
(556068) 2014 JR_{80}	2014	F51	Pan-STARRS 1	495	plutino	39.2	0.10	15	35.5	43.0	albedo: 0.074	catalog; MPC; JPL
(556130) 2014 KV_{101}	2014	F51	Pan-STARRS 1	168	plutino	39.1	0.26	17	29.1	49.1	albedo: 0.074	catalog; MPC; JPL
(556416) 2014 OE394	2014	F51	Pan-STARRS 1	391	cubewano (cold)	46.2	0.12	4	40.8	51.5	albedo: 0.152	catalog; MPC; JPL
(558093) 2014 WW_{535}	2014	F51	Pan-STARRS 1	87	centaur	34.7	0.31	19	24.1	45.3	albedo: 0.058	catalog; MPC; JPL
(558095) 2014 WA_{536}	2014	F51	Pan-STARRS 1	142	res · 2:5	55.8	0.45	27	30.6	81.1	albedo: 0.126	catalog; MPC; JPL
(558168) 2014 XQ_{40}	2014	F51	Pan-STARRS 1	90	centaur	66.9	0.73	15	18.0	115.9	albedo: 0.058	catalog; MPC; JPL
(558224) 2014 YC_{50}	2014	F51	Pan-STARRS 1	237	cubewano (hot)?	44.3	0.16	18	37.3	51.3	albedo: 0.079	catalog; MPC; JPL
(559178) 2015 BM_{518}	2015	F51	Pan-STARRS 1	195	res · 3:4	36.4	0.12	9	32.0	40.7	albedo: 0.126	catalog; MPC; JPL
(559179) 2015 BR_{518}	2015	F51	Pan-STARRS 1	179	res · 4:7	43.7	0.12	10	38.4	48.9	albedo: 0.126	catalog; MPC; JPL
(559180) 2015 BT_{518}	2015	F51	Pan-STARRS 1	315	cubewano (hot)	43.4	0.05	8	41.2	45.7	albedo: 0.079	catalog; MPC; JPL
(559181) 2015 BX_{518}	2015	F51	Pan-STARRS 1	377	cubewano (hot)?	42.8	0.17	28	35.5	50.1	albedo: 0.079	catalog; MPC; JPL
(559182) 2015 BZ_{518}	2015	F51	Pan-STARRS 1	538	cubewano (hot)?	46.7	0.18	11	38.1	55.3	albedo: 0.079	catalog; MPC; JPL
(559800) 2015 DW_{224}	2015	F51	Pan-STARRS 1	198	SDO	108.2	0.66	31	37.3	179.1	albedo: 0.124	catalog; MPC; JPL
(559801) 2015 DX_{224}	2015	F51	Pan-STARRS 1	188	SDO	66.8	0.47	19	35.7	97.8	albedo: 0.124	catalog; MPC; JPL
(560039) 2015 FP_{36}	2015	F51	Pan-STARRS 1	163	plutino	39.2	0.33	24	26.5	52.0	albedo: 0.074	catalog; MPC; JPL
(560414) 2015 FQ_{345}	2015	F51	Pan-STARRS 1	157	SDO	70.9	0.55	12	31.7	110.2	albedo: 0.124	catalog; MPC; JPL
(560552) 2015 GO_{50}	2015	807	Sheppard, S. S., Trujillo, C.	259	cubewano (hot)?	44.3	0.15	16	37.9	50.8	albedo: 0.079	catalog; MPC; JPL
(564160) 2016 FR_{59}	2016	W84	DECam	172	other TNO	36.3	0.04	10	34.9	37.6	albedo: 0.13	catalog; MPC; JPL
(567065) 2019 CY_{4}	2019	F51	Pan-STARRS 1	35	centaur	47.5	0.79	20	10.1	84.9	albedo: 0.058	catalog; MPC; JPL
(568573) 2004 HN_{79}	2004	568	Survey, C. L., Kavelaars, J.	182	cubewano (hot)?	45.5	0.23	12	35.2	55.8	albedo: 0.079	catalog; MPC; JPL
(574372) 2010 JO179	2010	F51	Pan-STARRS 1	647	SDO	77.9	0.50	32	39.1	116.7	albedo: 0.124	catalog; MPC; JPL
(574441) 2010 OE_{153}	2010	F51	Pan-STARRS 1	336	SDO	57.4	0.38	33	35.6	79.2	albedo: 0.124	catalog; MPC; JPL
(575713) 2011 UT_{410}	2011	568	M. Alexandersen, B. J. Gladman, J. J. Kavelaars	349	plutino	39.8	0.18	14	32.5	47.0	albedo: 0.074	catalog; MPC; JPL
(576212) 2012 HL_{85}	2012	F51	Pan-STARRS 1	226	cubewano (hot)?	40.4	0.02	17	39.6	41.2	albedo: 0.079	catalog; MPC; JPL
(576256) 2012 JH_{67}	2015	F51	Cerro Tololo-DECam	296	twotino	47.6	0.28	7	34.5	60.8	albedo: 0.126	catalog; MPC; JPL
(576257) 2012 JD_{68}	2012	F51	Pan-STARRS 1	113	plutino	39.1	0.29	29	27.9	50.3	albedo: 0.074	catalog; MPC; JPL
(577578) 2013 GW_{136}	2013	568	Outer Solar System Origins Survey	114	twotino	47.5	0.34	7	31.3	63.6	albedo: 0.126	catalog; MPC; JPL
(577627) 2013 HZ_{156}	2013	F51	Pan-STARRS 1	133	other TNO	40.8	0.11	20	36.3	45.2	albedo: 0.13	catalog; MPC; JPL
(578833) 2014 GV_{53}	2014	F51	Pan-STARRS 1	187	SDO	50.2	0.28	18	36.4	64.0	albedo: 0.124	catalog; MPC; JPL
(578834) 2014 GF_{54}	2013	F51	Sheppard, S. S., Trujillo, C.	195	plutino	39.4	0.19	9	32.0	46.8	albedo: 0.074	catalog; MPC; JPL
(578835) 2014 GL_{54}	2014	F51	Pan-STARRS 1	215	SDO	57.3	0.36	30	36.8	77.7	albedo: 0.124	catalog; MPC; JPL
(578847) 2014 GJ_{65}	2014	F51	Pan-STARRS 1	183	other TNO	51.2	0.22	47	40.1	62.3	albedo: 0.13	catalog; MPC; JPL
(578992) 2014 JL_{80}	2014	F51	Pan-STARRS 1	163	plutino	39.2	0.28	6	28.4	50.0	albedo: 0.074	catalog; MPC; JPL
(578993) 2014 JP_{80}	2014	F51	Pan-STARRS 1	477	plutino	39.4	0.08	19	36.3	42.4	albedo: 0.074	catalog; MPC; JPL
(578997) 2014 JR_{92}	2014	F51	Pan-STARRS 1	144	centaur	42.7	0.40	29	25.5	59.9	albedo: 0.058	catalog; MPC; JPL
(579062) 2014 KF_{113}	2014	F51	Pan-STARRS 1	198	cubewano (hot)?	42.5	0.18	28	35.1	50.0	albedo: 0.079	catalog; MPC; JPL
(579077) 2014 LP_{28}	2014	F51	Pan-STARRS 1	267	cubewano (hot)?	41.0	0.05	16	39.2	42.9	albedo: 0.079	catalog; MPC; JPL
(579246) 2014 OX_{415}	2014	F51	Pan-STARRS 1	131	plutino	39.0	0.26	19	28.7	49.3	albedo: 0.074	catalog; MPC; JPL
(581804) 2015 KN_{167}	2015	568	Outer Solar System Origins Survey	78	twotino	47.7	0.21	6	37.5	57.9	albedo: 0.126	catalog; MPC; JPL
(582301) 2015 RM_{306}	2015	F51	Pan-STARRS 1	34	centaur	265.6	0.96	176	11.5	519.7	albedo: 0.058	catalog; MPC; JPL
(583751) 2016 NZ_{90}	2016	F51	Pan-STARRS 1	154	twotino	47.3	0.28	22	34.3	60.4	albedo: 0.126	catalog; MPC; JPL
(584778) 2017 RG_{16}	2017	F51	Pan-STARRS 1	30	centaur	77.3	0.91	75	7.1	147.4	albedo: 0.058	catalog; MPC; JPL
(585899) 2020 HM_{98}	2018	F51	Pan-STARRS 1	45	centaur	82.4	0.84	138	13.2	151.6	albedo: 0.058	catalog; MPC; JPL
(585912) 2020 QK_{3}	2020	D29	PMO NEO Survey Program	84	centaur	32.1	0.58	25	13.5	50.8	albedo: 0.058	catalog; MPC; JPL
(585913) 2020 QQ_{7}	2020	D29	PMO NEO Survey Program	79	centaur	38.3	0.63	24	14.1	62.4	albedo: 0.058	catalog; MPC; JPL
(587670) 2006 QE_{181}	2006	807	Deep Ecliptic Survey	100	cubewano (cold)	42.7	0.03	2	41.5	43.9	albedo: 0.152	catalog; MPC; JPL
(589683) 2010 RF43	2010	809	La Silla	656	SDO	49.3	0.24	31	37.3	61.4	albedo: 0.124	catalog; MPC; JPL
(591370) 2013 ME_{14}	2013	F51	Pan-STARRS 1	74	centaur	37.1	0.49	38	19.0	55.3	albedo: 0.058	catalog; MPC; JPL
(591376) 2013 NL_{24}	2013	F51	Pan-STARRS 1	132	centaur	39.7	0.38	5	24.7	54.7	albedo: 0.045	catalog; MPC; JPL
(591392) 2013 PE_{84}	2013	F51	Pan-STARRS 1	228	cubewano (hot)	45.6	0.14	9	39.3	51.9	albedo: 0.079	catalog; MPC; JPL
(591486) 2013 TA_{188}	2014	W84	Bernardinelli, P. H., Bernstein, G., Sako, M.	102	plutino	39.7	0.29	10	28.3	51.1	albedo: 0.074	catalog; MPC; JPL
(592044) 2014 MB_{70}	2014	F51	Pan-STARRS 1	281	cubewano (hot)	46.4	0.11	9	41.3	51.6	albedo: 0.079	catalog; MPC; JPL
(592064) 2014 NZ_{65}	2014	F51	Pan-STARRS 1	281	cubewano (hot)?	44.0	0.17	29	36.4	51.7	albedo: 0.079	catalog; MPC; JPL
(592147) 2014 OA_{394}	2014	F51	Pan-STARRS 1	147	cubewano (cold)	46.6	0.18	4	38.1	55.1	albedo: 0.152	catalog; MPC; JPL
(592148) 2014 OM_{394}	2014	F51	Pan-STARRS 1	204	cubewano (cold)	44.1	0.07	2	40.9	47.3	albedo: 0.152	catalog; MPC; JPL
(592149) 2014 OR_{394}	2014	F51	Pan-STARRS 1	135	SDO	144.1	0.77	13	33.7	254.6	albedo: 0.124	catalog; MPC; JPL
(592245) 2014 QR_{441}	2014	W84	DECam	160	SDO	68.1	0.37	42	42.6	93.6	albedo: 0.124	catalog; MPC; JPL
(592487) 2014 WF_{509}	2014	F51	Pan-STARRS 1	294	cubewano (hot)	45.5	0.09	7	41.2	49.8	albedo: 0.079	catalog; MPC; JPL
(593616) 2015 RG_{277}	2015	568	Outer Solar System Origins Survey	179	cubewano (hot)	43.1	0.02	12	42.3	43.9	albedo: 0.079	catalog; MPC; JPL
(593617) 2015 RN_{278}	2005	807	Deep Ecliptic Survey	74	res · 4:5	35.0	0.04	7	33.5	36.5	albedo: 0.126	catalog; MPC; JPL
(594337) 2016 QU_{89}	2016	W84	Cerro Tololo-DECam	97	SDO	178.4	0.80	17	35.3	321.6	albedo: 0.124	catalog; MPC; JPL
(594994) 2000 QA_{243}	2000	807	Deep Ecliptic Survey	167	plutino	39.5	0.20	2	31.6	47.5	albedo: 0.074	catalog; MPC; JPL
(597614) 2007 RM_{314}	2007	568	P. A. Wiegert, A. Papadimos	194	SDO	70.8	0.48	21	36.6	105.0	albedo: 0.124	catalog; MPC; JPL
(599752) 2010 VQ_{11}	2010	809	La Silla	365	cubewano (hot)?	45.6	0.14	13	39.0	52.1	albedo: 0.079	catalog; MPC; JPL
(600181) 2011 OC_{61}	2011	F51	Pan-STARRS 1	177	cubewano (cold)	44.8	0.04	3	43.1	46.5	albedo: 0.152	catalog; MPC; JPL
(600217) 2011 QY_{100}	2011	F51	Pan-STARRS 1	126	centaur	178.4	0.89	26	19.6	337.2	albedo: 0.058	catalog; MPC; JPL
(601690) 2013 KZ_{18}	2013	F51	Pan-STARRS 1	94	centaur	34.3	0.45	36	18.9	49.7	albedo: 0.058	catalog; MPC; JPL
(602572) 2014 MD_{70}	2014	F51	Pan-STARRS 1	146	SDO	49.7	0.27	11	36.5	62.9	albedo: 0.124	catalog; MPC; JPL
(602714) 2014 ON_{394}	2014	F51	Pan-STARRS 1	112	SDO	62.7	0.48	12	32.6	92.9	albedo: 0.124	catalog; MPC; JPL
(602715) 2014 OO_{394}	2014	F51	Pan-STARRS 1	119	SDO	57.1	0.40	3	34.2	80.0	albedo: 0.124	catalog; MPC; JPL
(602716) 2014 OP_{394}	2014	F51	Pan-STARRS 1	228	SDO	67.0	0.45	22	36.8	97.2	albedo: 0.124	catalog; MPC; JPL
(603108) 2014 WB_{509}	2014	F51	Pan-STARRS 1	218	cubewano (hot)?	43.8	0.22	10	34.3	53.4	albedo: 0.079	catalog; MPC; JPL
(606187) 2017 QO_{33}	2017	F51	Pan-STARRS 1	11	damocloid	34.8	0.86	149	4.9	64.7	albedo: 0.048	catalog; MPC; JPL
(609221) 2004 VC_{131}	2004	568	CFHT Legacy Survey	209	cubewano (cold)	44.3	0.08	1	40.7	47.8	albedo: 0.152	catalog; MPC; JPL
(609222) 2004 VV_{131}	2004	568	CFHT Legacy Survey	168	cubewano (cold)	44.5	0.07	2	41.6	47.4	albedo: 0.152	catalog; MPC; JPL
(612019) 1994 EV_{3}	1994	568	Jewitt, D. C., Luu, J. X.	134	cubewano (cold)	42.7	0.05	2	40.8	44.7	albedo: 0.152; BRmag: 1.74; taxonomy: RR	catalog; MPC; JPL
(612026) 1995 DC_{2}	1995	568	Luu, J. X., Jewitt, D. C.	123	cubewano (cold)	44.1	0.06	2	41.5	46.7	albedo: 0.152	catalog; MPC; JPL
(612029) 1995 HM_{5}	1995	807	Luu, J. X.	135	plutino	39.3	0.25	5	29.6	49.1	albedo: 0.074; BRmag: 1.15; taxonomy: BR	catalog; MPC; JPL
(612045) 1996 RR_{20}	1996	950	La Palma	207	plutino	39.6	0.17	5	32.8	46.4	albedo: 0.074; BRmag: 1.87; taxonomy: RR	catalog; MPC; JPL
(612047) 1996 TK_{66}	1996	807	Schmidt, B., the High-Z team	181	cubewano (cold)	42.9	0.01	3	42.5	43.2	albedo: 0.152; BRmag: 1.62; taxonomy: RR	catalog; MPC; JPL
(612048) 1996 TS_{66}	1996	568	Mauna Kea	159	cubewano (hot)?	44.3	0.13	7	38.3	50.2	albedo: 0.179; BRmag: 1.79; taxonomy: RR	catalog; MPC; JPL
(612049) 1997 CT_{29}	1997	568	Mauna Kea	162	cubewano (cold)	43.8	0.03	1	42.6	45.0	albedo: 0.152	catalog; MPC; JPL
(612051) 1997 SZ_{10}	1997	568	Jewitt, D. C.	73	twotino	48.3	0.37	12	30.7	65.9	albedo: 0.126; BRmag: 1.79; taxonomy: RR	catalog; MPC; JPL
(612060) 1998 HH_{151}	1998	568	Mauna Kea	104	plutino	39.1	0.19	9	31.9	46.4	albedo: 0.074	catalog; MPC; JPL
(612081) 1998 WG_{24}	1998	695	Buie, M. W.	155	cubewano (cold)	45.9	0.13	2	39.8	52.0	albedo: 0.152	catalog; MPC; JPL
(612082) 1998 WY_{24}	1998	695	Buie, M. W.	147	cubewano (cold)	43.5	0.05	2	41.5	45.5	albedo: 0.152	catalog; MPC; JPL
(612083) 1998 WX_{31}	1998	695	Buie, M. W.	153	cubewano (cold)	45.8	0.11	3	40.6	51.0	albedo: 0.152	catalog; MPC; JPL
(612084) 1999 CF_{119}	1999	568	Mauna Kea	144	SDO	89.5	0.57	20	38.7	140.3	albedo: 0.124; BRmag: 1.46; taxonomy: BR-IR	catalog; MPC; JPL
(612085) 1999 CL_{119}	1999	568	Mauna Kea	282	cubewano (hot)?	47.0	0.01	23	46.6	47.4	albedo: 0.079; BRmag: 1.78	catalog; MPC; JPL
(612086) 1999 CX_{131}	1999	568	Mauna Kea	142	res · 3:5	42.3	0.23	10	32.4	52.2	albedo: 0.126; BRmag: 1.52; taxonomy: IR	catalog; MPC; JPL
(612087) 1999 CU_{153}	1999	568	Mauna Kea	123	cubewano (cold)	44.3	0.07	3	41.3	47.3	albedo: 0.152	catalog; MPC; JPL
(612088) 1999 CM_{158}	1999	568	Mauna Kea	115	plutino	39.4	0.28	9	28.3	50.4	binary: 67 km; albedo: 0.074	catalog; MPC; JPL
(612092) 1999 HV_{11}	1999	695	Kitt Peak	102	cubewano (cold)	42.8	0.03	3	41.5	44.1	albedo: 0.152; BRmag: 1.7	catalog; MPC; JPL
(612095) 1999 OJ4	1999	568	Mauna Kea	75	other TNO	38.1	0.03	4	37.0	39.2	binary: 72 km; albedo: 0.215; BRmag: 1.68; taxonomy: RR	catalog; MPC; JPL
(612100) 1999 RC_{215}	1999	568	Mauna Kea	144	cubewano (cold)	44.3	0.06	1	41.5	47.1	albedo: 0.152	catalog; MPC; JPL
(612101) 1999 RJ_{215}	1999	568	Mauna Kea	125	res · 4:11?	59.7	0.42	20	34.7	84.7	albedo: 0.126; BRmag: 1.22	catalog; MPC; JPL
(612102) 1999 RK_{215}	1999	568	Mauna Kea	156	plutino	39.5	0.13	12	34.3	44.8	albedo: 0.074	catalog; MPC; JPL
(612141) 1999 XY_{143}	1999	696	Hergenrother, C. W.	209	cubewano (hot)	43.3	0.08	7	39.9	46.6	binary: 175 km; albedo: 0.079	catalog; MPC; JPL
(612144) 2000 CP_{104}	2000	695	Buie, M. W.	208	cubewano (hot)	44.3	0.10	10	40.0	48.6	albedo: 0.079	catalog; MPC; JPL
(612145) 2000 CQ_{104}	2000	695	Buie, M. W.	84	res · 3:4	36.7	0.24	14	28.0	45.3	albedo: 0.126; BRmag: 1.31; taxonomy: BR	catalog; MPC; JPL
(612146) 2000 CE_{105}	2000	695	Buie, M. W.	120	cubewano (cold)	44.1	0.06	1	41.4	46.8	albedo: 0.152	catalog; MPC; JPL
(612147) 2000 CF_{105}	2000	695	Buie, M. W.	64	cubewano (cold)	44.0	0.04	1	42.2	45.8	binary: 46 km; albedo: 0.3; BRmag: 1.7	catalog; MPC; JPL
(612148) 2000 CG_{105}	2000	695	Buie, M. W.	195	cubewano (hot)?	46.4	0.04	28	44.4	48.4	albedo: 0.079; BRmag: 1.17	catalog; MPC; JPL
(612149) 2000 CJ_{105}	2000	695	Buie, M. W.	288	cubewano (hot)	44.2	0.11	12	39.4	48.9	albedo: 0.079; BRmag: 1.76; taxonomy: RR	catalog; MPC; JPL
(612150) 2000 CO_{105}	2000	695	Buie, M. W.	324	cubewano (hot)?	47.2	0.15	19	40.4	54.1	albedo: 0.079; BRmag: 1.52	catalog; MPC; JPL
(612156) 2000 FF_{8}	2000	568	Mauna Kea	99	cubewano (cold)	45.0	0.10	5	40.7	49.3	albedo: 0.152	catalog; MPC; JPL
(612157) 2000 FG_{8}	2000	568	Mauna Kea	102	cubewano (cold)	43.8	0.07	1	40.9	46.7	albedo: 0.152	catalog; MPC; JPL
(612158) 2000 FV_{53}	2000	568	Mauna Kea	119	plutino	39.0	0.16	17	32.7	45.3	albedo: 0.074	catalog; MPC; JPL
(612161) 2000 KK_{4}	2000	695	Kitt Peak	266	cubewano (hot)?	41.1	0.09	19	37.5	44.7	albedo: 0.079; BRmag: 1.55; taxonomy: U	catalog; MPC; JPL
(612166) 2000 ON_{67}	2000	807	Buie, M. W., Kern, S. D.	149	cubewano (cold)	43.1	0.03	3	41.8	44.3	albedo: 0.152	catalog; MPC; JPL
(612167) 2000 OU_{69}	2000	807	Buie, M. W.	149	cubewano (cold)	43.2	0.05	4	41.1	45.2	albedo: 0.152	catalog; MPC; JPL
(612174) 2000 QC_{226}	2000	809	Hainaut, O. R., Delahodde, C. E.	145	cubewano (cold)	44.2	0.05	3	42.0	46.5	albedo: 0.152; BRmag: 1.88	catalog; MPC; JPL
(612175) 2000 QE_{226}	2000	809	Hainaut, O. R., Delahodde, C. E.	176	cubewano (cold)	44.1	0.09	1	40.4	47.8	albedo: 0.152	catalog; MPC; JPL
(612176) 2000 QL_{251}	2000	807	Buie, M. W.	148	twotino	48.0	0.22	4	37.6	58.3	binary: 143 km; albedo: 0.07; BRmag: 1.36; taxonomy: BR	catalog; MPC; JPL
(612203) 2000 WT_{169}	2000	568	Mauna Kea	156	cubewano (cold)	45.2	0.01	2	44.7	45.7	binary: 128 km; albedo: 0.152	catalog; MPC; JPL
(612208) 2000 YH_{2}	2000	695	Kitt Peak	145	plutino	39.6	0.31	13	27.4	51.8	albedo: 0.074	catalog; MPC; JPL
(612213) 2001 FK_{185}	2001	695	Buie, M. W.	98	cubewano (cold)	43.1	0.04	1	41.5	44.7	albedo: 0.152	catalog; MPC; JPL
(612214) 2001 FK_{193}	2001	695	Buie, M. W.	148	cubewano (cold)	43.8	0.06	4	41.2	46.5	albedo: 0.152	catalog; MPC; JPL
(612217) 2001 HZ_{58}	2001	809	Hainaut, O. R., Delsanti, A. C.	169	cubewano (cold)	42.5	0.04	3	40.8	44.3	albedo: 0.152; BRmag: 1.64; taxonomy: U	catalog; MPC; JPL
(612218) 2001 KD_{77}	2001	807	Buie, M. W.	232	plutino	39.4	0.11	2	35.0	43.7	albedo: 0.089; BRmag: 1.77; taxonomy: RR	catalog; MPC; JPL
(612236) 2001 QO_{297}	2001	807	Buie, M. W.	162	cubewano (cold)	43.1	0.04	1	41.4	44.8	albedo: 0.152	catalog; MPC; JPL
(612237) 2001 QP_{297}	2001	807	Buie, M. W.	147	cubewano (cold)	45.3	0.12	1	40.0	50.7	albedo: 0.152	catalog; MPC; JPL
(612238) 2001 QR_{297}	2001	807	Buie, M. W.	213	cubewano (hot)	44.4	0.03	5	43.2	45.7	albedo: 0.079	catalog; MPC; JPL
(612239) 2001 QC_{298}	2001	807	Buie, M. W.	235	cubewano (hot)?	46.4	0.13	31	40.6	52.2	binary: 192 km; albedo: 0.063; BRmag: 1.24; taxonomy: BR	catalog; MPC; JPL
(612240) 2001 QE_{298}	2001	807	Buie, M. W.	110	res · 4:7	43.9	0.16	4	36.9	50.9	albedo: 0.126; BRmag: 1.89; taxonomy: RR	catalog; MPC; JPL
(612241) 2001 QH_{298}	2001	807	Buie, M. W.	118	plutino	39.5	0.11	7	35.3	43.8	albedo: 0.074	catalog; MPC; JPL
(612242) 2001 QQ_{322}	2001	807	Buie, M. W.	123	cubewano (cold)	44.1	0.06	4	41.7	46.6	binary: 113 km; albedo: 0.152	catalog; MPC; JPL
(612243) 2001 QR322	2001	807	Buie, M. W.	178	nep trj	30.2	0.02	22	29.5	31.0	albedo: 0.033; BRmag: 1.26	catalog; MPC; JPL
(612244) 2001 QS_{322}	2001	807	Buie, M. W.	186	cubewano (cold)	44.2	0.04	0	42.4	46.0	albedo: 0.095	catalog; MPC; JPL
(612245) 2001 QX_{322}	2001	950	La Palma	190	SDO	58.4	0.39	29	35.7	81.2	albedo: 0.124; BRmag: 1.46; taxonomy: IR	catalog; MPC; JPL
(612332) 2002 CW_{224}	2002	695	Buie, M. W.	182	plutino	39.6	0.25	6	29.9	49.4	albedo: 0.074	catalog; MPC; JPL
(612333) 2002 CZ_{224}	2002	695	Buie, M. W.	141	cubewano (cold)	45.1	0.06	2	42.4	47.8	albedo: 0.152	catalog; MPC; JPL
(612349) 2002 GH_{32}	2002	807	Buie, M. W.	230	cubewano (hot)?	41.9	0.09	27	38.0	45.8	albedo: 0.075; BRmag: 1.56; taxonomy: IR	catalog; MPC; JPL
(612350) 2002 GP_{32}	2002	807	Buie, M. W.	181	res · 2:5	55.0	0.42	2	32.0	78.1	albedo: 0.096; BRmag: 1.61; taxonomy: U	catalog; MPC; JPL
(612351) 2002 GV_{32}	2002	807	Buie, M. W.	163	plutino	39.3	0.19	5	31.9	46.7	albedo: 0.074; BRmag: 1.96; taxonomy: RR	catalog; MPC; JPL
(612352) 2002 GY_{32}	2002	807	Buie, M. W.	161	plutino	39.3	0.09	2	35.8	42.7	albedo: 0.074	catalog; MPC; JPL
(612388) 2002 PV_{170}	2002	568	Mauna Kea	188	cubewano (cold)	42.7	0.02	1	42.0	43.4	albedo: 0.152	catalog; MPC; JPL
(612524) 2002 VD_{130}	2002	695	Buie, M. W.	128	twotino	48.2	0.33	4	32.4	64.0	albedo: 0.126	catalog; MPC; JPL
(612533) 2002 XV93	2002	644	Palomar	549	plutino	39.6	0.13	13	34.6	44.6	albedo: 0.04; BRmag: 1.09	catalog; MPC; JPL
(612547) 2003 HD_{57}	2003	568	Mauna Kea	125	plutino	39.2	0.18	6	32.3	46.2	albedo: 0.074	catalog; MPC; JPL
(612548) 2003 HE_{57}	2003	568	Mauna Kea	160	cubewano (hot)	44.1	0.10	9	39.6	48.5	albedo: 0.079	catalog; MPC; JPL
(612549) 2003 HG_{57}	2003	568	Mauna Kea	129	cubewano (cold)	43.5	0.03	2	42.2	44.7	binary: 129 km; albedo: 0.152	catalog; MPC; JPL
(612573) 2003 QV_{90}	2003	807	Buie, M. W.	130	cubewano (cold)	44.0	0.06	2	41.5	46.6	albedo: 0.152	catalog; MPC; JPL
(612574) 2003 QB_{91}	2003	807	Buie, M. W.	220	plutino	39.3	0.19	7	31.9	46.8	albedo: 0.074	catalog; MPC; JPL
(612575) 2003 QK_{91}	2003	807	Buie, M. W.	135	SDO	67.9	0.43	4	38.5	97.3	albedo: 0.124; BRmag: 1.37; taxonomy: BR	catalog; MPC; JPL
(612576) 2003 QO_{91}	2003	807	Buie, M. W.	178	cubewano (hot)	45.5	0.13	7	39.4	51.5	albedo: 0.079	catalog; MPC; JPL
(612577) 2003 QQ_{91}	2003	807	Buie, M. W.	102	other TNO	39.0	0.08	5	36.0	41.9	albedo: 0.13; BRmag: 1.18	catalog; MPC; JPL
(612578) 2003 QR_{91}	2003	807	Buie, M. W.	207	cubewano (cold)	46.6	0.18	4	38.1	55.0	binary: 189 km; albedo: 0.054	catalog; MPC; JPL
(612579) 2003 QT_{91}	2003	807	Buie, M. W.	118	cubewano (cold)	44.3	0.08	0	40.7	48.0	albedo: 0.152	catalog; MPC; JPL
(612580) 2003 QA_{92}	2003	807	Buie, M. W.	165	other TNO	38.3	0.06	3	35.9	40.7	albedo: 0.13; BRmag: 1.67	catalog; MPC; JPL
(612581) 2003 QX_{111}	2003	807	Buie, M. W.	434	plutino	39.4	0.13	10	34.3	44.5	albedo: 0.018	catalog; MPC; JPL
(612582) 2003 QY_{111}	2003	807	Buie, M. W.	128	cubewano (cold)	43.5	0.04	3	41.9	45.0	albedo: 0.152	catalog; MPC; JPL
(612583) 2003 QZ_{111}	2003	807	Buie, M. W.	124	cubewano (cold)	43.1	0.06	3	40.5	45.8	albedo: 0.152	catalog; MPC; JPL
(612584) 2003 QX113	2003	568	Mauna Kea	371	SDO	49.6	0.25	7	37.1	62.1	albedo: 0.124	catalog; MPC; JPL
(612619) 2003 SN_{317}	2003	568	Mauna Kea	137	cubewano (cold)	42.7	0.04	2	40.9	44.4	binary: 97 km; albedo: 0.152	catalog; MPC; JPL
(612620) 2003 SQ317	2003	568	Mauna Kea	92	Haumea	42.9	0.08	29	39.3	46.4	albedo: 0.44; BRmag: 1.05	catalog; MPC; JPL
(612621) 2003 SR_{317}	2003	568	Mauna Kea	135	plutino	39.6	0.16	8	33.1	46.1	albedo: 0.074	catalog; MPC; JPL
(612658) 2003 TH_{58}	2003	568	Mauna Kea	171	plutino	39.6	0.10	28	35.8	43.4	albedo: 0.074; BRmag: 0.87; taxonomy: U	catalog; MPC; JPL
(612687) 2003 UN_{284}	2003	695	Buie, M. W.	124	cubewano (cold)	42.9	0.01	3	42.5	43.3	binary: 83 km; albedo: 0.09	catalog; MPC; JPL
(612688) 2003 UT_{292}	2003	695	Buie, M. W.	186	plutino	39.6	0.30	18	27.7	51.6	albedo: 0.067	catalog; MPC; JPL
(612719) 2003 WU_{188}	2003	695	Buie, M. W.	178	cubewano (cold)	44.4	0.04	4	42.5	46.3	binary: 129 km; albedo: 0.15	catalog; MPC; JPL
(612732) 2003 YQ_{179}	2003	568	Mauna Kea	147	SDO	89.6	0.58	21	37.2	141.9	albedo: 0.124	catalog; MPC; JPL
(612733) 2003 YU_{179}	2003	568	Mauna Kea	122	cubewano (cold)	47.0	0.16	5	39.3	54.7	binary: 67 km; albedo: 0.152	catalog; MPC; JPL
(612772) 2004 FU_{148}	2004	695	Buie, M. W.	160	plutino	39.4	0.23	17	30.5	48.2	albedo: 0.074	catalog; MPC; JPL
(612793) 2004 PW_{107}	2004	807	Buie, M. W.	148	res · 4:7	43.9	0.14	3	38.0	49.9	albedo: 0.126; BRmag: 1.81; taxonomy: RR-IR	catalog; MPC; JPL
(612794) 2004 PY_{107}	2004	807	Buie, M. W.	176	cubewano (cold)	44.1	0.09	2	40.0	48.2	albedo: 0.152	catalog; MPC; JPL
(612795) 2004 PA_{108}	2004	807	Buie, M. W.	141	cubewano (cold)	43.9	0.04	1	42.1	45.7	albedo: 0.152	catalog; MPC; JPL
(612798) 2004 PA_{112}	2004	807	Buie, M. W.	118	other TNO	39.1	0.11	33	34.7	43.5	albedo: 0.13	catalog; MPC; JPL
(612883) 2004 TF_{282}	2004	695	Buie, M. W.	208	SDO	81.9	0.52	23	39.4	124.4	albedo: 0.124	catalog; MPC; JPL
(612891) 2004 TT_{357}	2004	695	Buie, M. W.	98	res · 2:5	56.0	0.44	9	31.5	80.5	albedo: 0.126; BRmag: 1.5; taxonomy: IR	catalog; MPC; JPL
(612892) 2004 TV_{357}	2004	695	Buie, M. W.	164	twotino	48.2	0.29	10	34.5	61.9	albedo: 0.126; BRmag: 1.07; taxonomy: BB	catalog; MPC; JPL
(612911) 2004 XR190	2004	568	Mauna Kea	500	other TNO	57.8	0.11	47	51.6	64.1	albedo: 0.13; BRmag: 1.24; taxonomy: BR	catalog; MPC; JPL
(612931) 2005 CA_{79}	2005	644	Palomar	346	twotino	48.0	0.23	12	37.1	59.0	albedo: 0.126; BRmag: 1.76; taxonomy: RR-IR	catalog; MPC; JPL
(612951) 2005 EB_{299}	2005	695	Buie, M. W.	101	centaur	52.0	0.51	1	25.4	78.6	albedo: 0.083	catalog; MPC; JPL
(612952) 2005 EZ_{300}	2005	695	Buie, M. W.	149	plutino	39.4	0.24	10	30.1	48.7	albedo: 0.074	catalog; MPC; JPL
(612953) 2005 ER_{318}	2005	695	Buie, M. W.	93	res · 3:4	36.5	0.16	10	30.6	42.4	albedo: 0.126; BRmag: 1.32; taxonomy: BR	catalog; MPC; JPL
(612985) 2005 JA_{175}	2005	807	Buie, M. W.	289	cubewano (hot)?	42.3	0.11	14	37.6	47.0	albedo: 0.079	catalog; MPC; JPL
(613037) 2005 RP_{43}	2005	705	Apache Point	232	res · 2:11	94.4	0.59	23	38.4	150.4	albedo: 0.126	catalog; MPC; JPL
(613087) 2005 SE_{278}	2005	705	Apache Point	141	res · 3:5	42.6	0.11	7	37.7	47.4	albedo: 0.126; BRmag: 1.82; taxonomy: RR	catalog; MPC; JPL
(613100) 2005 TN74	2005	304	Trujillo, C. A., Sheppard, S. S.	118	res · 3:5	42.8	0.25	2	32.1	53.4	albedo: 0.126	catalog; MPC; JPL
(613411) 2006 HQ_{122}	2006	807	Buie, M. W.	186	SDO	90.4	0.58	22	37.6	143.1	albedo: 0.124	catalog; MPC; JPL
(613412) 2006 HV_{122}	2006	807	Buie, M. W.	150	SDO	80.3	0.53	16	37.6	123.1	albedo: 0.124	catalog; MPC; JPL
(613468) 2006 QQ_{180}	2006	705	Apache Point	167	res · 3:5	42.4	0.17	9	35.1	49.7	albedo: 0.126	catalog; MPC; JPL
(613469) 2006 QJ_{181}	2006	807	Cerro Tololo	144	res · 1:3	63.5	0.50	20	31.6	95.4	albedo: 0.126; BRmag: 1.49; taxonomy: IR-BR	catalog; MPC; JPL
(613490) 2006 RJ103	2006	705	Apache Point	179	nep trj	30.2	0.03	8	29.3	31.2	albedo: 0.058; BRmag: 1.31	catalog; MPC; JPL
(613619) 2006 UX_{184}	2006	950	La Palma	96	centaur	38.3	0.47	37	20.4	56.1	albedo: 0.058	catalog; MPC; JPL
(613620) 2006 UZ_{184}	2006	950	La Palma	133	plutino	39.6	0.23	15	30.5	48.7	albedo: 0.074	catalog; MPC; JPL
(613766) 2007 NC_{7}	2007	675	Palomar Mountain	115	centaur	34.1	0.50	6	16.9	51.2	albedo: 0.058; BRmag: 1.28	catalog; MPC; JPL
(613857) 2007 TZ_{417}	2007	807	Cerro Tololo	150	cubewano (hot)?	41.8	0.14	22	36.1	47.6	albedo: 0.079	catalog; MPC; JPL
(613858) 2007 TA_{418}	2007	807	Cerro Tololo	135	SDO	73.6	0.51	22	36.0	111.2	albedo: 0.124	catalog; MPC; JPL
(613908) 2007 VK_{305}	2007	705	Apache Point	196	SDO	57.5	0.36	20	36.7	78.3	albedo: 0.124	catalog; MPC; JPL
(614688) 2011 KN_{36}	2011	568	Micheli, M., Tholen, D. J.	141	cubewano (cold)	43.5	0.06	3	41.0	46.0	albedo: 0.152	catalog; MPC; JPL
(616560) 2005 XN_{113}	2005	695	Deep Ecliptic Survey	184	res · 2:5	56.1	0.41	3	33.0	79.1	albedo: 0.126	catalog; MPC; JPL
(617103) 2003 FM_{129}	2003	807	Deep Lens Survey	197	SDO	50.3	0.27	18	36.5	64.0	albedo: 0.124	catalog; MPC; JPL
(620057) 2005 CG_{81}	2005	568	CFHT Legacy Survey	194	other TNO	54.0	0.24	26	41.1	66.9	albedo: 0.13	catalog; MPC; JPL
(620065) 2010 JF_{210}	2010	F51	Pan-STARRS 1	240	cubewano (hot)	45.0	0.07	8	42.0	48.0	albedo: 0.079	catalog; MPC; JPL
(620074) 2013 AT_{183}	2013	F51	Pan-STARRS 1	392	SDO	62.3	0.42	28	35.9	88.7	albedo: 0.124	catalog; MPC; JPL
(620075) 2013 CD_{223}	2011	F51	Pan-STARRS 1	341	plutino	39.5	0.22	5	30.7	48.2	albedo: 0.074	catalog; MPC; JPL
(620086) 2015 BB_{519}	2015	F51	Pan-STARRS 1	170	SDO	64.2	0.45	28	35.4	93.0	albedo: 0.124	catalog; MPC; JPL
(620087) 2015 DE_{249}	2015	W84	Cerro Tololo-DECam	120	SDO	59.4	0.43	18	33.8	84.9	albedo: 0.124	catalog; MPC; JPL
(620088) 2015 DJ_{249}	2015	W84	Cerro Tololo-DECam	168	other TNO	51.6	0.23	13	39.7	63.6	albedo: 0.13	catalog; MPC; JPL
(620502) 2004 HP_{79}	2004	568	CFHT Legacy Survey	178	twotino	47.4	0.18	2	38.8	55.9	albedo: 0.126	catalog; MPC; JPL
(621861) 2011 EY_{90}	2011	F51	Pan-STARRS 1	155	twotino	47.7	0.26	8	35.4	60.0	albedo: 0.126	catalog; MPC; JPL
(622544) 2014 HD_{200}	2014	F51	Pan-STARRS 1	200	plutino	39.1	0.06	15	36.6	41.6	albedo: 0.074	catalog; MPC; JPL
(623070) 2015 KW_{174}	2015	568	Outer Solar System Origins Survey	100	other TNO	48.6	0.28	14	35.1	62.0	albedo: 0.13	catalog; MPC; JPL
(624884) 2004 MW_{8}	2004	568	CFHT Legacy Survey	106	centaur	33.6	0.34	8	22.3	44.8	albedo: 0.058	catalog; MPC; JPL
(634511) 2011 UQ_{62}	2011	F51	Pan-STARRS 1	64	centaur	53.5	0.73	16	14.7	92.3	albedo: 0.058	catalog; MPC; JPL
(640522) 2001 RV_{143}	2001	695	Deep Ecliptic Survey	136	cubewano (cold)	46.3	0.08	1	42.7	50.0	albedo: 0.152	catalog; MPC; JPL
(646188) 2008 AQ_{118}	2008	568	P. A. Wiegert	292	cubewano (hot)	41.6	0.07	25	38.9	44.3	albedo: 0.079	catalog; MPC; JPL
(649172) 2010 XE_{91}	2010	F51	Pan-STARRS 1	170	res · 1:3?	63.8	0.46	18	34.2	93.4	albedo: 0.126	catalog; MPC; JPL
(650031) 2011 UJ_{413}	2011	F51	Pan-STARRS 1	162	SDO	75.1	0.52	17	36.3	113.9	albedo: 0.124	catalog; MPC; JPL
(652169) 2013 UE_{15}	2003	645	Sloan Digital Sky Survey	108	centaur	61.0	0.66	7	20.9	101.1	albedo: 0.058	catalog; MPC; JPL
(652920) 2014 GR_{53}	2014	F51	Pan-STARRS 1	129	centaur	202.8	0.89	42	22.6	383.0	albedo: 0.058	catalog; MPC; JPL
(653589) 2014 QW_{441}	2014	F51	Pan-STARRS 1	449	cubewano (hot)	44.4	0.11	29	39.8	49.1	albedo: 0.079	catalog; MPC; JPL
(654190) 2014 YY_{49}	2008	G96	Mount Lemmon Survey	32	centaur	31.5	0.61	20	12.4	50.6	albedo: 0.13	catalog; MPC; JPL
(654569) 2015 BA_{519}	2015	F51	Pan-STARRS 1	138	plutino	39.3	0.22	3	30.9	47.8	albedo: 0.074	catalog; MPC; JPL
(656128) 2015 VZ_{184}	2015	568	S. S. Sheppard	133	plutino	39.6	0.28	14	28.5	50.7	albedo: 0.074	catalog; MPC; JPL
(659889) 2021 GV_{122}	2021	W93	Y. JeongAhn	102	res · 4:9	51.7	0.33	15	34.7	68.6	albedo: 0.126	catalog; MPC; JPL
(661333) 2004 PY_{117}	2004	568	Kavelaars, J.	137	other TNO	40.1	0.28	23	28.8	51.3	albedo: 0.13	catalog; MPC; JPL
(666182) 2009 YG_{19}	1995	691	Spacewatch	214	res · 2:5	56.3	0.41	5	33.0	79.7	albedo: 0.126; BRmag: 1.62	catalog; MPC; JPL
(666184) 2009 YS_{26}	2009	F51	Pan-STARRS 1	175	other TNO	36.8	0.03	7	35.8	37.8	albedo: 0.13	catalog; MPC; JPL
(666185) 2009 YT_{26}	2009	F51	Pan-STARRS 1	255	plutino	39.6	0.18	10	32.4	46.9	albedo: 0.074	catalog; MPC; JPL
(666201) 2009 YK_{32}	2009	F51	Pan-STARRS 1	154	cubewano (cold)	44.4	0.04	4	42.8	45.9	binary: 140 km; albedo: 0.152	catalog; MPC; JPL
(666226) 2010 AV_{153}	2010	F51	Pan-STARRS 1	172	plutino	39.6	0.26	8	29.3	49.9	albedo: 0.074	catalog; MPC; JPL
(666449) 2010 JJ_{210}	2010	F51	Pan-STARRS 1	152	SDO	49.4	0.25	7	37.1	61.6	albedo: 0.124	catalog; MPC; JPL
(666739) 2010 TS_{191}	2010	F51	Pan-STARRS 1	135	nep trj	30.2	0.05	7	28.6	31.8	albedo: 0.058; BRmag: 1.15	catalog; MPC; JPL
(666823) 2010 VR_{11}	2010	809	La Silla	349	cubewano (hot)?	41.7	0.15	31	35.5	48.0	albedo: 0.079	catalog; MPC; JPL
(666902) 2010 VX_{224}	2010	F51	Pan-STARRS 1	197	other TNO	40.1	0.21	16	31.8	48.4	albedo: 0.13	catalog; MPC; JPL
(667160) 2011 BO_{170}	2011	F51	Pan-STARRS 1	195	cubewano (hot)?	46.6	0.20	15	37.4	55.8	albedo: 0.079	catalog; MPC; JPL
(667161) 2011 BP_{170}	2011	F51	Pan-STARRS 1	187	res · 1:5	88.7	0.61	23	35.1	142.3	albedo: 0.126	catalog; MPC; JPL
(667474) 2011 JX_{31}	2011	268	New Horizons KBO Search	130	cubewano (cold)	44.8	0.11	3	39.7	49.8	albedo: 0.152	catalog; MPC; JPL
(667522) 2011 MV_{11}	2011	F51	Pan-STARRS 1	227	SDO	60.7	0.39	15	36.8	84.5	albedo: 0.124	catalog; MPC; JPL
(668381) 2011 WJ_{157}	2011	F51	Pan-STARRS 1	409	res 1:6	100.9	0.63	27	37.5	164.4	albedo: 0.126	catalog; MPC; JPL
(668506) 2012 AZ_{25}	2012	F51	Pan-STARRS 1	304	SDO	54.9	0.33	18	36.5	73.3	albedo: 0.124	catalog; MPC; JPL
(668643) 2012 DR30	2008	E12	PMO NEO Survey Program	188	centaur	944.7	0.99	78	14.5	1874.8	albedo: 0.076; BRmag: 1.21; taxonomy: BR-IR	catalog; MPC; JPL
(669235) 2012 TC_{324}	2008	645	Sloan Digital Sky Survey	176	res · 3:5	42.6	0.20	10	34.0	51.2	albedo: 0.126	catalog; MPC; JPL
(669535) 2012 XR_{157}	2012	807	Trujillo, C., Sheppard, S. S.	208	twotino	48.2	0.23	30	37.1	59.3	albedo: 0.126	catalog; MPC; JPL
(669843) 2013 CA_{134}	2013	F51	Pan-STARRS 1	30	centaur	30.9	0.65	9	10.9	50.8	albedo: 0.058	catalog; MPC; JPL
(669935) 2013 CZ_{242}	2013	F51	Pan-STARRS 1	267	cubewano (hot)?	44.9	0.23	34	34.6	55.2	albedo: 0.079	catalog; MPC; JPL
(670817) 2014 AM_{55}	2014	F51	Pan-STARRS 1	435	cubewano (hot)	47.3	0.14	7	40.8	53.8	albedo: 0.079	catalog; MPC; JPL
(670857) 2014 BD_{70}	2014	F51	Pan-STARRS 1	399	cubewano (hot)?	41.6	0.13	23	36.2	46.9	albedo: 0.079	catalog; MPC; JPL
(671087) 2014 FY_{71}	2014	807	Sheppard, S. S., Trujillo, C.	406	cubewano (hot)?	43.5	0.21	19	34.4	52.5	albedo: 0.079	catalog; MPC; JPL
(671467) 2014 LO_{28}	2014	F51	Pan-STARRS 1	427	cubewano (hot)?	43.0	0.12	26	37.8	48.2	albedo: 0.079	catalog; MPC; JPL
(671468) 2014 LQ_{28}	2014	F51	Pan-STARRS 1	179	cubewano (cold)	43.8	0.10	1	39.4	48.1	binary: 148 km; albedo: 0.152	catalog; MPC; JPL
(671593) 2014 NT_{86}	2014	F51	Pan-STARRS 1	305	plutino	39.3	0.13	8	34.3	44.4	albedo: 0.074	catalog; MPC; JPL
(672508) 2014 UA_{225}	2015	568	Outer Solar System Origins Survey	147	SDO	68.3	0.46	4	36.7	99.9	albedo: 0.124	catalog; MPC; JPL
(672947) 2014 YD_{50}	2014	F51	Pan-STARRS 1	180	SDO	99.8	0.66	10	33.5	166.1	albedo: 0.124	catalog; MPC; JPL
(673087) 2015 AJ281	2011	F51	La Silla	507	cubewano (hot)?	43.3	0.13	27	37.8	48.7	albedo: 0.079	catalog; MPC; JPL
(673088) 2015 AL_{281}	2015	F51	Pan-STARRS 1	192	cubewano (cold)	46.3	0.09	4	42.3	50.2	albedo: 0.152	catalog; MPC; JPL
(673589) 2015 DX_{248}	2015	W84	Cerro Tololo-DECam	127	cubewano (hot)?	41.4	0.09	24	37.9	45.0	albedo: 0.079	catalog; MPC; JPL
(674118) 2015 KH162	2015	568	D. J. Tholen	566	SDO	61.6	0.33	29	41.0	82.2	albedo: 0.124	catalog; MPC; JPL
(674546) 2015 PF_{312}	2015	W84	DECam	268	cubewano (hot)	45.6	0.10	18	41.2	50.0	albedo: 0.079	catalog; MPC; JPL
(678191) 2017 OF69	2017	568	D. J. Tholen, S. S. Sheppard, C. Trujillo	533	plutino	39.4	0.21	14	30.9	47.8	albedo: 0.074	catalog; MPC; JPL
(678865) 2017 YK_{3}	2017	F51	Pan-STARRS 1	209	plutino	39.8	0.29	2	28.4	51.2	albedo: 0.074	catalog; MPC; JPL
(679964) 2022 LV_{2}	2022	F52	Pan-STARRS 2	95	centaur	30.7	0.65	30	10.7	50.7	albedo: 0.058	catalog; MPC; JPL
(679997) 2023 RB	2023	F51	Pan-STARRS 1	45	centaur	33.4	0.75	4	8.3	58.5	albedo: 0.058	catalog; MPC; JPL
(681280) 2004 VV_{130}	2004	568	P. A. Wiegert, A. Papadimos	155	plutino	39.8	0.20	24	32.0	47.5	albedo: 0.074	catalog; MPC; JPL
(681521) 2005 NV_{125}	2005	568	P. A. Wiegert, A. M. Gilbert	181	other TNO	43.7	0.22	13	34.0	53.4	albedo: 0.13	catalog; MPC; JPL
(685799) 2009 YR_{26}	2009	F51	Pan-STARRS 1	311	cubewano (hot)?	41.6	0.06	19	39.3	43.9	albedo: 0.079	catalog; MPC; JPL
(685903) 2010 DF_{106}	2010	F51	Pan-STARRS 1	137	centaur	30.5	0.15	29	25.8	35.2	albedo: 0.058	catalog; MPC; JPL
(686073) 2010 PT_{66}	2010	809	La Silla	255	res · 1:3?	62.5	0.43	18	35.6	89.4	albedo: 0.126	catalog; MPC; JPL
(686081) 2010 QQ_{7}	2010	F51	Pan-STARRS 1	245	SDO	112.7	0.69	18	35.5	189.9	albedo: 0.124	catalog; MPC; JPL
(686150) 2010 RK_{190}	2010	F51	Pan-STARRS 1	307	plutino	39.6	0.19	7	32.0	47.2	albedo: 0.074	catalog; MPC; JPL
(688052) 2012 FN_{87}	2012	F51	Pan-STARRS 1	138	plutino	39.2	0.25	21	29.4	49.1	albedo: 0.074	catalog; MPC; JPL
(688708) 2012 WD_{37}	2012	F51	Pan-STARRS 1	159	other TNO	40.4	0.12	21	35.5	45.3	albedo: 0.13	catalog; MPC; JPL
(688888) 2013 AS_{183}	2013	F51	Pan-STARRS 1	171	SDO	61.7	0.41	22	36.3	87.1	albedo: 0.124	catalog; MPC; JPL
(689335) 2013 FL_{28}	2013	807	Sheppard, S. S., Trujillo, C.	91	SDO	367.2	0.91	16	32.1	702.3	albedo: 0.124	catalog; MPC; JPL
(689790) 2013 MR_{18}	2013	F51	Pan-STARRS 1	129	plutino	39.2	0.34	31	26.0	52.4	albedo: 0.074	catalog; MPC; JPL
(690420) 2014 FC72	2014	F51	Pan-STARRS 1	437	SDO	75.2	0.31	30	51.7	98.7	albedo: 0.124	catalog; MPC; JPL
(690456) 2014 GK_{65}	2014	F51	Pan-STARRS 1	240	centaur	43.6	0.31	20	29.9	57.2	albedo: 0.058	catalog; MPC; JPL
(690703) 2014 KA_{102}	2014	F51	Pan-STARRS 1	205	SDO	105.0	0.66	27	36.2	173.8	albedo: 0.124	catalog; MPC; JPL
(690821) 2014 MX_{69}	2014	F51	Pan-STARRS 1	166	centaur	32.2	0.27	11	23.5	40.9	albedo: 0.058	catalog; MPC; JPL
(690822) 2014 MH_{70}	2014	F51	Pan-STARRS 1	324	plutino	39.4	0.17	3	32.7	46.1	albedo: 0.074	catalog; MPC; JPL
(691721) 2014 QY_{441}	2005	F51	Trilling, D. E.	264	res · 3:4	36.7	0.08	10	33.9	39.5	albedo: 0.126	catalog; MPC; JPL
(692479) 2014 WY_{535}	2014	F51	Pan-STARRS 1	218	SDO	57.0	0.37	27	35.7	78.3	albedo: 0.124	catalog; MPC; JPL
(692887) 2015 BP_{518}	2014	F51	Pan-STARRS 1	228	res · 4:7?	43.6	0.18	10	35.6	51.6	albedo: 0.126	catalog; MPC; JPL
(693096) 2015 DW_{248}	2015	W84	DECam	210	SDO	51.3	0.26	24	38.2	64.5	albedo: 0.124	catalog; MPC; JPL
(693861) 2015 MQ_{204}	2009	F51	Pan-STARRS 1	298	SDO	54.8	0.35	30	35.9	73.7	albedo: 0.124	catalog; MPC; JPL
(699414) 2020 CM_{3}	2020	G37	A. Thirouin	177	SDO	72.5	0.52	11	35.1	110.0	albedo: 0.124	catalog; MPC; JPL
(709487) 2013 BL76	2012	G96	Pan-STARRS 1	37	centaur	1264.0	0.99	99	8.4	2519.5	albedo: 0.058; BRmag: 1.37	catalog; MPC; JPL
(721572) 2003 UA_{414}	2003	644	NEAT	383	res · 2:9	82.3	0.55	22	36.7	127.9	albedo: 0.126	catalog; MPC; JPL
(728216) 2010 LB_{136}	2010	F51	Pan-STARRS 1	298	plutino	39.1	0.26	14	29.0	49.3	albedo: 0.074	catalog; MPC; JPL
(728767) 2010 RF_{64}	2010	809	D. L. Rabinowitz, M. E. Schwamb, S. Tourtellotte	376	cubewano (hot)?	43.2	0.18	29	35.6	50.8	albedo: 0.079	catalog; MPC; JPL
(729174) 2011 BR_{163}	2011	F51	Pan-STARRS 1	239	SDO	98.6	0.62	25	37.9	159.3	albedo: 0.124	catalog; MPC; JPL
(745125) 2010 SB_{41}	2010	D35	LUSS	122	plutino	39.8	0.29	5	28.4	51.2	albedo: 0.074	catalog; MPC; JPL
(748122) 2013 FN_{28}	2013	807	Sheppard, S. S., Trujillo, C.	116	centaur	35.3	0.43	9	20.3	50.3	albedo: 0.058	catalog; MPC; JPL
(749801) 2014 OY_{393}	2014	F51	Pan-STARRS 1	71	centaur	80.4	0.77	9	18.7	142.1	albedo: 0.058	catalog; MPC; JPL
(757460) 2003 UP_{292}	2003	695	Deep Ecliptic Survey	132	twotino	48.3	0.42	13	27.9	68.7	albedo: 0.126	catalog; MPC; JPL
(762135) 2010 WG9	2010	809	La Silla	113	centaur	53.5	0.65	70	18.8	88.2	albedo: 0.074; BRmag: 1.1; taxonomy: U	catalog; MPC; JPL
(762870) 2011 RS	2011	F51	Pan-STARRS 1	108	centaur	40.9	0.48	16	21.3	60.4	albedo: 0.058	catalog; MPC; JPL
(763666) 2012 HX_{87}	2012	F51	Pan-STARRS 1	177	SDO	104.1	0.67	13	34.8	173.5	albedo: 0.124	catalog; MPC; JPL
(764929) 2013 PU_{74}	2013	F51	Pan-STARRS 1	46	centaur	34.0	0.54	13	15.8	52.2	albedo: 0.058	catalog; MPC; JPL
(765047) 2013 RA109	2013	W84	Cerro Tololo-DECam	216	EDDO	491.4	0.91	12	46.1	936.6	albedo: 0.124	catalog; MPC; JPL
(765133) 2013 SL102	2013	W84	Cerro Tololo-DECam	142	ESDO	327.3	0.88	7	38.2	616.4	albedo: 0.124	catalog; MPC; JPL
(766174) 2014 GQ_{101}	2014	F51	Pan-STARRS 1	43	centaur	448.2	0.97	147	15.1	881.3	albedo: 0.058	catalog; MPC; JPL
(767044) 2014 QW_{510}	2020	F51	Pan-STARRS 1	176	centaur	219.1	0.88	26	26.0	412.3	albedo: 0.058	catalog; MPC; JPL
(767254) 2014 SJ_{378}	2014	W84	Sheppard, S., Trujillo, C.	119	centaur	83.2	0.72	37	23.7	142.8	albedo: 0.058	catalog; MPC; JPL
768325 Geyagugv	2016	W84	DECam	511	ESDO	491.3	0.93	54	35.3	947.3	albedo: 0.124	catalog; MPC; JPL
(771740) 2016 QV_{89}	2016	W84	Cerro Tololo-DECam	243	SDO	178.3	0.78	21	40.0	316.6	albedo: 0.124	catalog; MPC; JPL
(773721) 2020 YR_{3}	2020	V00	Bok NEO Survey	76	centaur	437.4	0.96	169	16.5	858.3	albedo: 0.058	catalog; MPC; JPL
(780605) 2012 UD_{185}	2012	F51	Pan-STARRS 1	172	nep trj	30.4	0.04	28	29.2	31.5	albedo: 0.058	catalog; MPC; JPL
(800768) 2014 JQ_{92}	2014	F51	Pan-STARRS 1	103	plutino	39.2	0.34	24	26.1	52.3	albedo: 0.074	catalog; MPC; JPL
(800974) 2014 MG_{70}	2014	F51	Pan-STARRS 1	280	cubewano (hot)	43.3	0.05	12	41.0	45.7	albedo: 0.079	catalog; MPC; JPL
(801004) 2014 NA_{66}	2014	F51	Pan-STARRS 1	169	cubewano (hot)?	42.7	0.21	16	33.8	51.7	albedo: 0.079	catalog; MPC; JPL
(801504) 2014 TX_{85}	2014	F51	Pan-STARRS 1	152	other TNO	40.9	0.11	22	36.3	45.5	albedo: 0.13	catalog; MPC; JPL
(821768) 2015 KG_{178}	2015	W84	Cerro Tololo-DECam	160	plutino	39.2	0.28	28	28.4	50.1	albedo: 0.079	catalog; MPC; JPL
(829523) 2006 TO_{130}	2006	568	P. A. Wiegert, A. M. Gilbert	111	res · 3:4	36.7	0.16	1	30.9	42.5	albedo: 0.126	catalog; MPC; JPL
(831302) 2009 JZ_{18}	2005	645	Sloan Digital Sky Survey	138	plutino	39.2	0.25	24	29.6	48.8	albedo: 0.074	catalog; MPC; JPL
(834635) 2010 RN_{64}	2010	809	D. L. Rabinowitz, M. E. Schwamb, S. Tourtellotte	388	cubewano (hot)?	41.1	0.09	20	37.5	44.6	albedo: 0.079	catalog; MPC; JPL
(834655) 2010 RD_{188}	2010	F51	Pan-STARRS 1	330	cubewano (hot)?	40.6	0.06	28	38.0	43.1	albedo: 0.079	catalog; MPC; JPL
(836666) 2012 TD_{324}	2012	F51	M. Holman, W. Fraser, P. Lacerda, M.Payne	192	plutino	39.5	0.14	10	34.1	45.0	albedo: 0.074	catalog; MPC; JPL
(836927) 2012 VR_{128}	2012	F51	Pan-STARRS 1	556	cubewano (hot)?	41.6	0.14	18	35.6	47.5	albedo: 0.079	catalog; MPC; JPL
(856771) 2011 VZ_{24}	2010	F51	Pan-STARRS 1	154	SDO	51.6	0.34	23	34.1	69.2	albedo: 0.124	catalog; MPC; JPL
(857176) 2012 EE_{18}	2012	F51	Pan-STARRS 1	204	SDO	68.1	0.44	16	38.1	98.1	albedo: 0.124	catalog; MPC; JPL
(859283) 2013 JK_{64}	2013	568	Maunakea	98	res · 2:5	54.9	0.41	11	32.7	77.1	albedo: 0.126	catalog; MPC; JPL
(861890) 2014 OF_{394}	2014	F51	Pan-STARRS 1	296	cubewano (hot)?	46.9	0.14	22	40.3	53.5	albedo: 0.079	catalog; MPC; JPL
(863637) 2014 UH_{192}	2014	F51	Pan-STARRS 1	174	twotino	47.9	0.26	16	35.6	60.2	albedo: 0.126	catalog; MPC; JPL
(868711) 2016 FN_{59}	2016	W84	Allen, L., James, D.	166	SDO	58.4	0.39	6	35.7	81.2	albedo: 0.124	catalog; MPC; JPL
(875354) 2003 HM_{57}	2015	F51	Pan-STARRS 1	116	centaur	41.8	0.68	11	13.5	70.0	albedo: 0.058	catalog; MPC; JPL
(875618) 2005 GX_{206}	2015	F51	Pan-STARRS 1	132	res · 2:7	68.9	0.52	9	33.1	104.6	albedo: 0.126	catalog; MPC; JPL
(878973) 2013 FO_{28}	2013	807	Sheppard, S. S., Trujillo, C.	162	twotino	47.7	0.22	9	37.1	58.3	albedo: 0.126	catalog; MPC; JPL
(879291) 2013 TM_{159}	2013	F51	Pan-STARRS 1	203	cubewano (hot)	46.8	0.17	10	38.9	54.9	albedo: 0.079	catalog; MPC; JPL
(879991) 2014 OQ_{394}	2014	F51	Pan-STARRS 1	146	SDO	62.3	0.44	29	34.8	89.9	albedo: 0.124; taxonomy: RR	catalog; MPC; JPL
(880665) 2014 WP_{509}	2013	F51	Pan-STARRS 1	612	cubewano (hot)	45.3	0.09	8	41.1	49.5	albedo: 0.079	catalog; MPC; JPL
(883538) 2016 SE_{56}	2017	F51	Pan-STARRS 1	138	res · 2:7	70.5	0.56	27	31.1	110.0	albedo: 0.126; taxonomy: IR	catalog; MPC; JPL
(890831) 2014 OV_{393}	2014	F51	Pan-STARRS 1	275	plutino	39.2	0.11	4	35.0	43.4	albedo: 0.074	catalog; MPC; JPL
(890927) 2014 QF_{433}	2014	F51	Pan-STARRS 1	200	cubewano (cold)	45.9	0.10	5	41.2	50.6	albedo: 0.152	catalog; MPC; JPL
(895734) 2021 PN_{72}	2021	F51	Pan-STARRS 1	25	damocloid	323.5	0.99	85	4.5	642.6	albedo: 0.048	catalog; MPC; JPL
(895852) 2024 JL_{23}	2024	F52	Pan-STARRS 2	28	centaur	76.5	0.85	22	11.5	141.4	albedo: 0.058	catalog; MPC; JPL
(895907) 2026 BK_{13}	2026	F52	Pan-STARRS 2	50	—	144.9	0.90	30	14.3	275.6	—	catalog; MPC; JPL

back to top

== Unnumbered TNOs ==
There are 7,256 unnumbered trans-Neptunian objects, defined here as minor planets with a semi-major axis larger than 30.1 AU (Neptune's average orbital distance from the Sun). The data is sourced from MPC's "List of Trans Neptunian Objects", "List Of Centaurs and Scattered-Disk Objects", "List Of Other Unusual Objects", and "Database Search", completed with information from Johnston's Archive (diameter, class, binary status, etc.). For the list of numbered TNOs, see § List.

== Trans-Neptunian satellites ==
A growing number of TNOs are revealed to be binary systems with a minor-planet moon orbiting its primary. There are also several multiple systems with more than one satellite.

== Diagram: orbital classes ==

- cold classical: 1,271 (22.6%)
- hot classical: 1,221 (21.7%)
- SDOs: 807 (14.3%)
- plutinos (3∶2 res.): 572 (10.2%)
- other resonances: 511 (9.1%)
- centaurs: 368 (6.5%)
- twotinos (2∶1 res.): 146 (2.6%)
- damocloids: 88 (1.6%)
- neptune trojans: 32 (0.6%)
- EDDOs: 15 (0.3%)
- ESDOs: 13 (0.2%)
- Haumea family: 12 (0.2%)
- amors: 5 (0.1%)
- unusual: 4 (0.1%)
- sednoids: 3 (0.1%)
- unclassified TNOs: 562 (10.0%)
5630 TNOs (a > 30.1 AU) from Johnston's archive grouped by orbital subclasses.

Trans-Neptunian objects colorized by their orbital subclass and plotted in the orbital parameter space (eccentricity and inclination versus semi-major axis). The plot for the entire region contains 1418 objects including plutinos (#185), twotinos (#36), other resonant objects (#124), cubewanos (#420), inner (#40) and outer classical objects (#6), SDOs (#289), sednoids (#11), centaurs (#101) and other TNOs (#206).

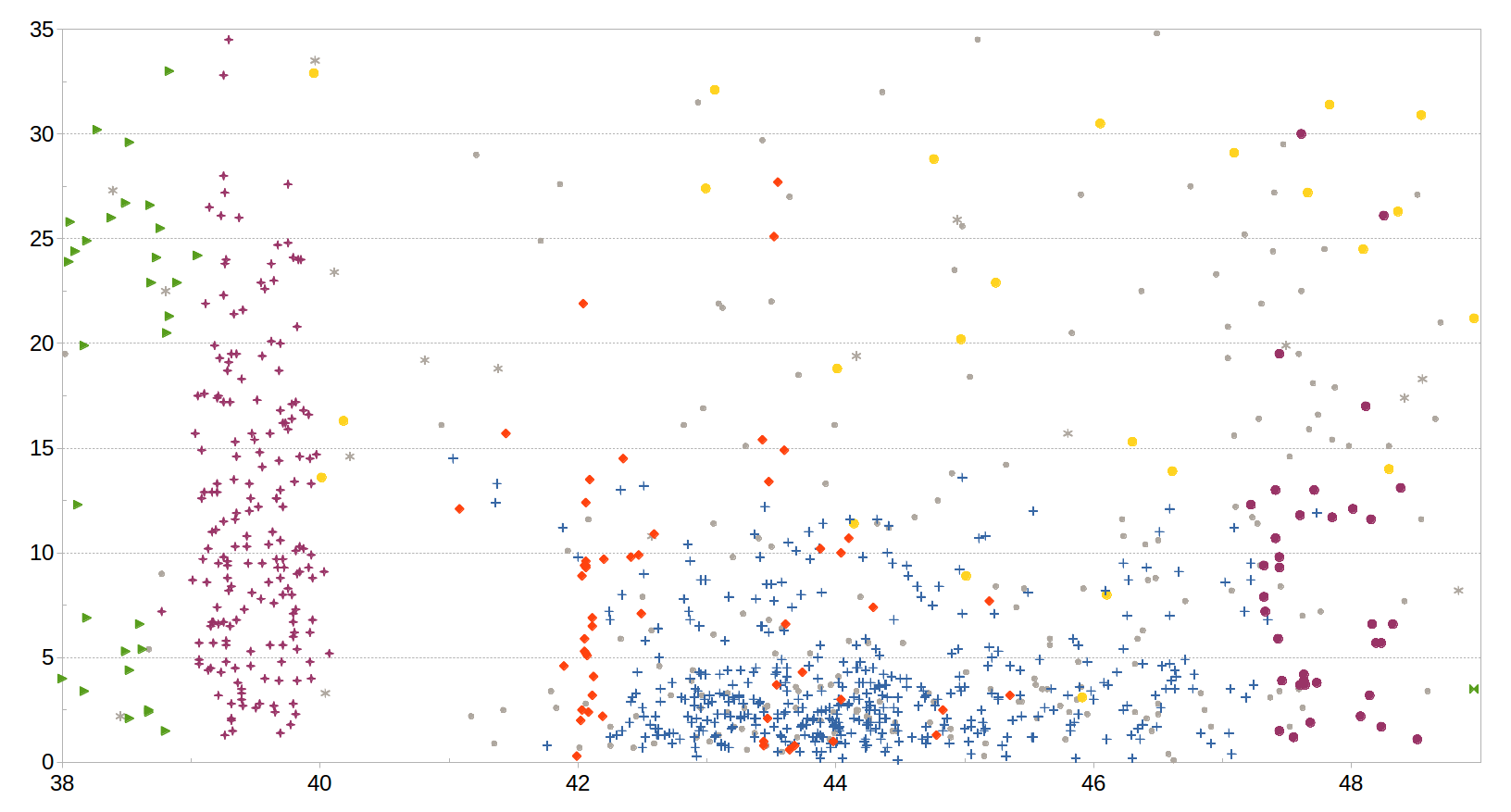
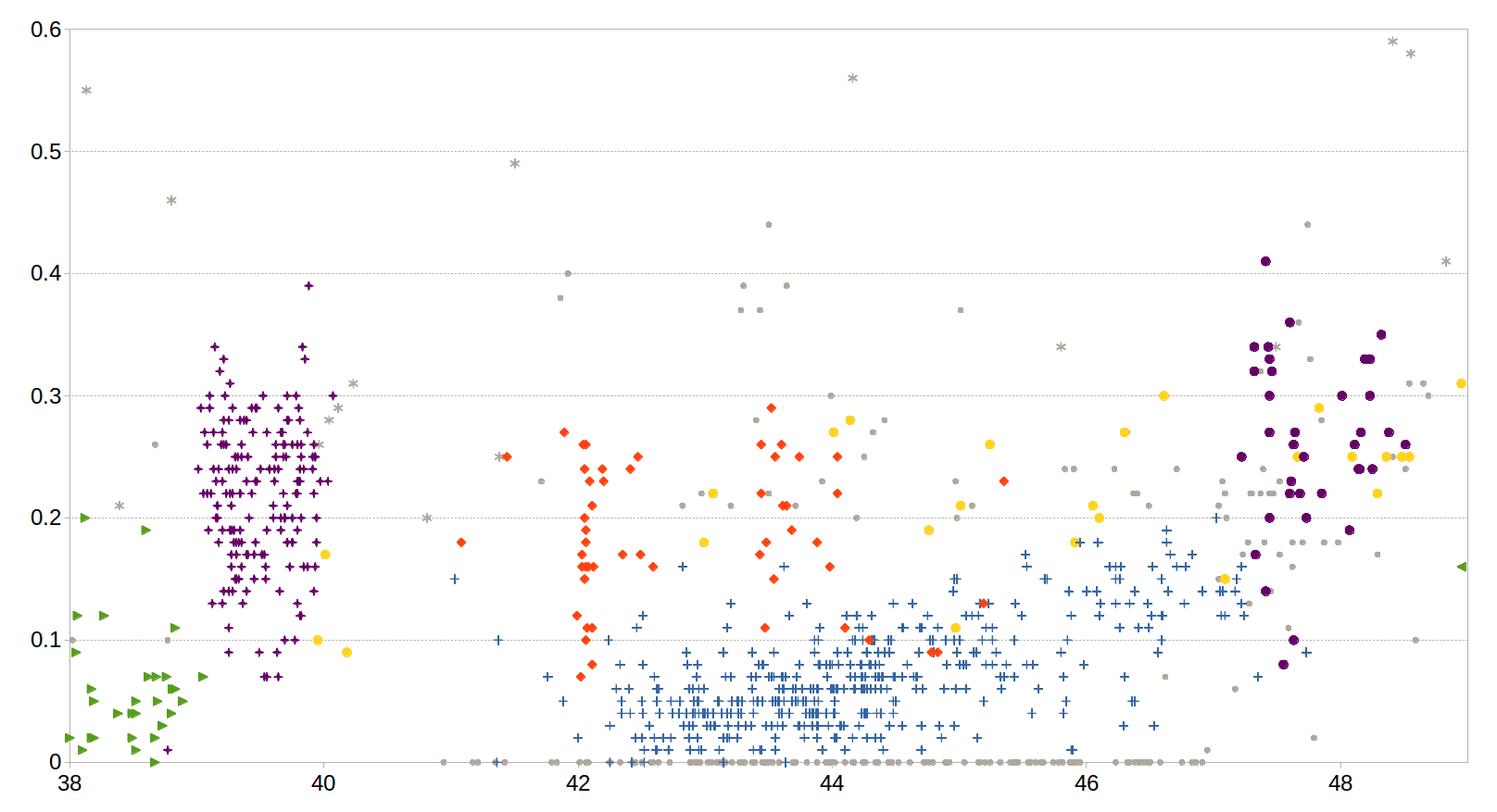
Core region (38–49 AU): inclination (left) and eccentricity (right) vs. semi-major axis (a)
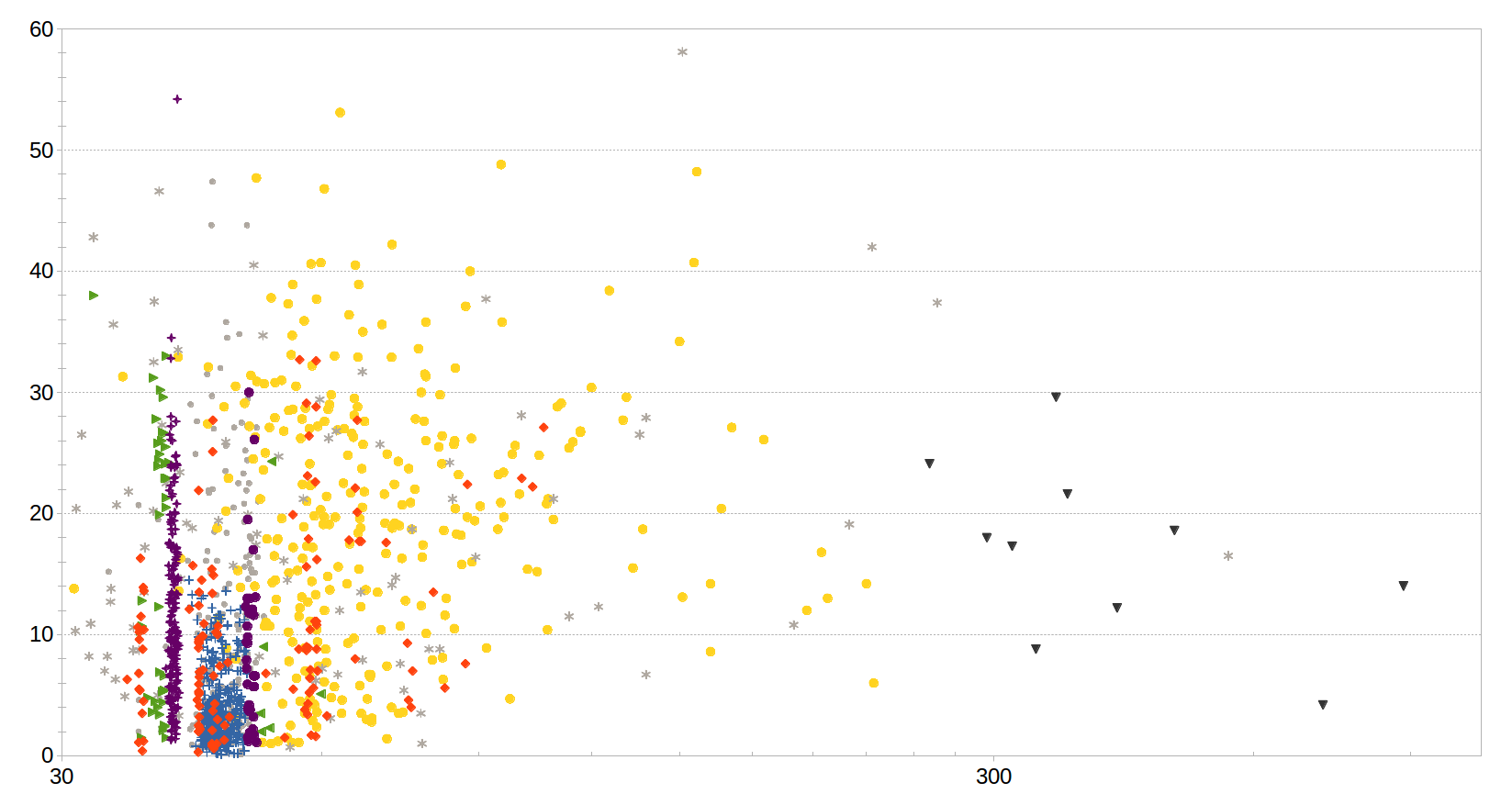
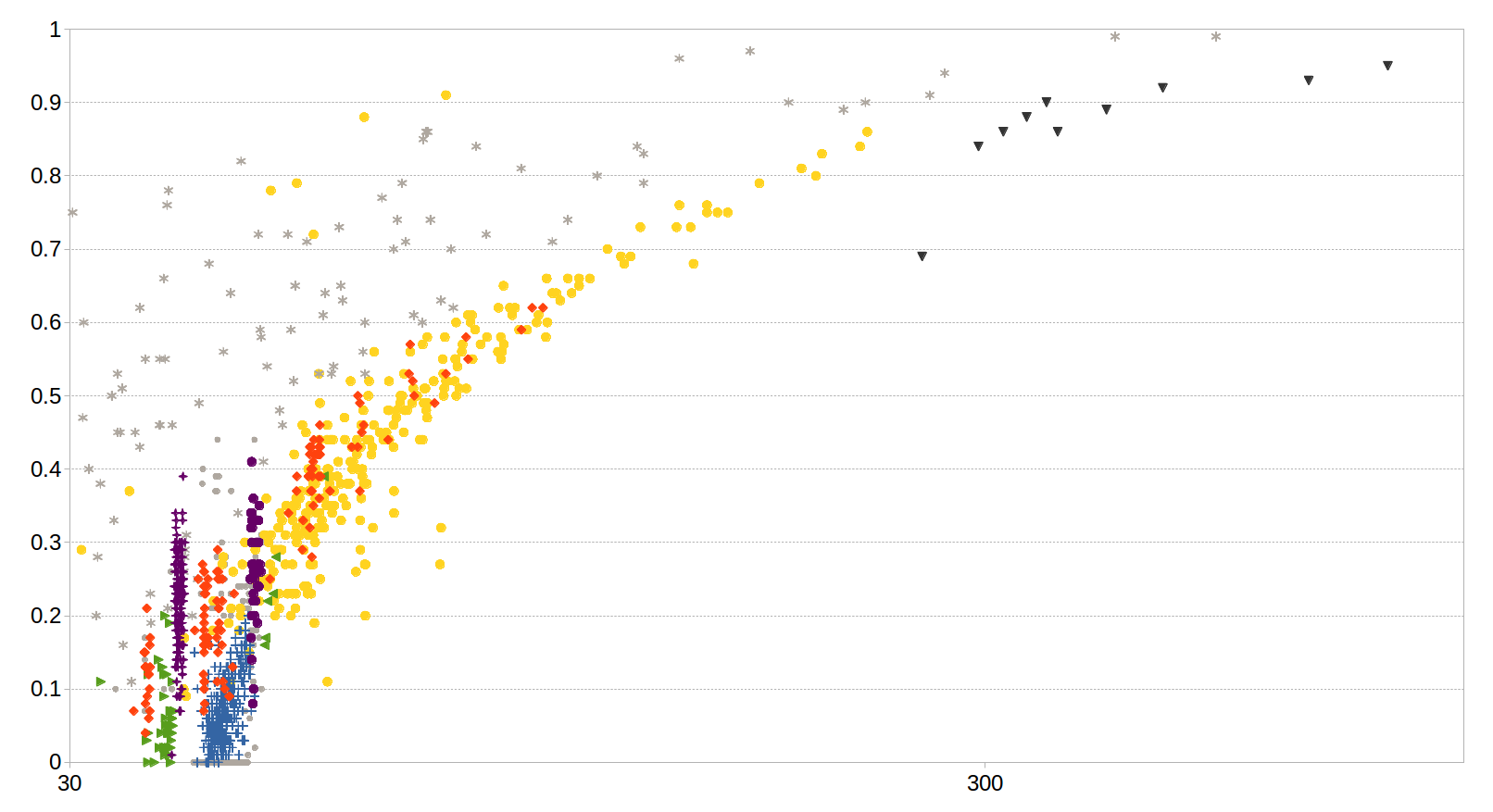
Full region on a logarithmic scale from 30 to 1000 AU: inclination (left) and eccentricity (right) vs. a

== See also ==
- Lists of astronomical objects
- List of centaurs (small Solar System bodies)
- List of minor planets
- List of the brightest Kuiper belt objects
- List of Solar System objects by greatest aphelion
- List of Solar System objects most distant from the Sun
- Planet Nine
