= List of minor planets: 536001–537000 =

The following is a partial list of minor planets, running from minor-planet number 536001 through 537000, inclusive. The primary data for this and other partial lists is based on JPL's "Small-Body Orbital Elements" and data available from the Minor Planet Center. Critical list information is also provided by the MPC, unless otherwise specified from Lowell Observatory. A detailed description of the table's columns and additional sources are given on the main page including a complete list of every page in this series, and a statistical break-up on the dynamical classification of minor planets.

Also see the summary list of all named bodies in numerical and alphabetical order, and the corresponding naming citations for the number range of this particular list. New namings may only be added to this list after official publication, as the preannouncement of names is condemned by the Working Group for Small Bodies Nomenclature of the International Astronomical Union.

| Near-Earth obj. | MBA (inner) | MBA (outer) | Centaur |
| Mars-crosser | MBA (middle) | Jupiter trojan | Trans-Neptunian obj. |
| Unclassified |

== 536001–536100 ==
| Designation | | | Discovery | | | Properties | | Ref |
| Permanent | Provisional | Named after | Date | Site | Discoverer(s) | Category | Diam. | Ref |
|---|---|---|---|---|---|---|---|---|
| 536001 | 2015 BX_{531} | — | January 23, 2015 | Haleakala | Pan-STARRS 1 | MAR | 820 m | MPC · JPL |
| 536002 | 2015 BZ_{531} | — | January 23, 2015 | Haleakala | Pan-STARRS 1 | · | 1.7 km | MPC · JPL |
| 536003 | 2015 BB_{532} | — | January 23, 2015 | Haleakala | Pan-STARRS 1 | AGN | 940 m | MPC · JPL |
| 536004 | 2015 BO_{532} | — | January 24, 2015 | Haleakala | Pan-STARRS 1 | · | 1.2 km | MPC · JPL |
| 536005 | 2015 BZ_{532} | — | January 29, 2015 | Haleakala | Pan-STARRS 1 | · | 1.5 km | MPC · JPL |
| 536006 | 2015 BD_{533} | — | January 28, 2015 | Haleakala | Pan-STARRS 1 | · | 1.7 km | MPC · JPL |
| 536007 | 2015 BF_{533} | — | January 12, 2010 | Mount Lemmon | Mount Lemmon Survey | · | 1.3 km | MPC · JPL |
| 536008 | 2015 BG_{533} | — | January 28, 2015 | Haleakala | Pan-STARRS 1 | HNS | 1.1 km | MPC · JPL |
| 536009 | 2015 BX_{533} | — | January 22, 2006 | Mount Lemmon | Mount Lemmon Survey | · | 1.5 km | MPC · JPL |
| 536010 | 2015 BF_{534} | — | May 12, 2010 | WISE | WISE | · | 2.1 km | MPC · JPL |
| 536011 | 2015 BG_{534} | — | January 16, 2015 | Haleakala | Pan-STARRS 1 | EOS | 1.9 km | MPC · JPL |
| 536012 | 2015 BH_{534} | — | August 14, 2012 | Haleakala | Pan-STARRS 1 | EOS | 2.0 km | MPC · JPL |
| 536013 | 2015 BN_{534} | — | August 10, 2007 | Kitt Peak | Spacewatch | · | 2.0 km | MPC · JPL |
| 536014 | 2015 BP_{534} | — | October 14, 2013 | Mount Lemmon | Mount Lemmon Survey | EOS | 1.8 km | MPC · JPL |
| 536015 | 2015 BW_{534} | — | November 12, 2013 | Mount Lemmon | Mount Lemmon Survey | · | 1.5 km | MPC · JPL |
| 536016 | 2015 BX_{534} | — | October 11, 2012 | Haleakala | Pan-STARRS 1 | · | 2.7 km | MPC · JPL |
| 536017 | 2015 BY_{534} | — | October 3, 1997 | Kitt Peak | Spacewatch | · | 1.8 km | MPC · JPL |
| 536018 | 2015 BZ_{534} | — | November 26, 2013 | Mount Lemmon | Mount Lemmon Survey | · | 2.5 km | MPC · JPL |
| 536019 | 2015 BA_{535} | — | November 26, 2013 | Mount Lemmon | Mount Lemmon Survey | · | 2.6 km | MPC · JPL |
| 536020 | 2015 BB_{535} | — | October 4, 2003 | Kitt Peak | Spacewatch | · | 1.8 km | MPC · JPL |
| 536021 | 2015 BD_{535} | — | September 3, 2008 | Kitt Peak | Spacewatch | · | 1.5 km | MPC · JPL |
| 536022 | 2015 BE_{535} | — | October 13, 2007 | Mount Lemmon | Mount Lemmon Survey | · | 1.9 km | MPC · JPL |
| 536023 | 2015 BH_{535} | — | November 6, 2005 | Mount Lemmon | Mount Lemmon Survey | · | 920 m | MPC · JPL |
| 536024 | 2015 BK_{535} | — | January 17, 2015 | Haleakala | Pan-STARRS 1 | · | 1.1 km | MPC · JPL |
| 536025 | 2015 BM_{535} | — | November 17, 2009 | Mount Lemmon | Mount Lemmon Survey | · | 1.0 km | MPC · JPL |
| 536026 | 2015 BN_{535} | — | January 17, 2015 | Haleakala | Pan-STARRS 1 | · | 1.0 km | MPC · JPL |
| 536027 | 2015 BQ_{535} | — | November 30, 2005 | Mount Lemmon | Mount Lemmon Survey | EUN | 920 m | MPC · JPL |
| 536028 | 2015 BS_{535} | — | October 1, 2005 | Mount Lemmon | Mount Lemmon Survey | · | 1.1 km | MPC · JPL |
| 536029 | 2015 BU_{535} | — | December 25, 2005 | Mount Lemmon | Mount Lemmon Survey | · | 1.7 km | MPC · JPL |
| 536030 | 2015 BV_{535} | — | September 25, 2009 | Kitt Peak | Spacewatch | · | 1.2 km | MPC · JPL |
| 536031 | 2015 BW_{535} | — | February 7, 2011 | Mount Lemmon | Mount Lemmon Survey | · | 1.0 km | MPC · JPL |
| 536032 | 2015 BX_{535} | — | April 28, 2011 | Kitt Peak | Spacewatch | · | 1.0 km | MPC · JPL |
| 536033 | 2015 BZ_{535} | — | April 30, 2011 | Mount Lemmon | Mount Lemmon Survey | · | 1.1 km | MPC · JPL |
| 536034 | 2015 BE_{536} | — | November 1, 2005 | Mount Lemmon | Mount Lemmon Survey | · | 1.3 km | MPC · JPL |
| 536035 | 2015 BF_{536} | — | January 28, 2015 | Haleakala | Pan-STARRS 1 | V | 460 m | MPC · JPL |
| 536036 | 2015 BJ_{536} | — | October 29, 2005 | Mount Lemmon | Mount Lemmon Survey | · | 1.8 km | MPC · JPL |
| 536037 | 2015 BP_{536} | — | October 3, 2013 | Kitt Peak | Spacewatch | · | 1.7 km | MPC · JPL |
| 536038 | 2015 BX_{536} | — | January 21, 2015 | Haleakala | Pan-STARRS 1 | · | 1.5 km | MPC · JPL |
| 536039 | 2015 BZ_{536} | — | July 29, 2008 | Kitt Peak | Spacewatch | · | 1.7 km | MPC · JPL |
| 536040 | 2015 BA_{537} | — | January 26, 2006 | Mount Lemmon | Mount Lemmon Survey | · | 1.2 km | MPC · JPL |
| 536041 | 2015 BD_{537} | — | January 26, 2006 | Kitt Peak | Spacewatch | EUN | 1.0 km | MPC · JPL |
| 536042 | 2015 BG_{537} | — | January 28, 2006 | Mount Lemmon | Mount Lemmon Survey | · | 1.1 km | MPC · JPL |
| 536043 | 2015 BL_{537} | — | March 9, 2006 | Kitt Peak | Spacewatch | · | 1.7 km | MPC · JPL |
| 536044 | 2015 BN_{537} | — | February 24, 2006 | Mount Lemmon | Mount Lemmon Survey | · | 1.5 km | MPC · JPL |
| 536045 | 2015 BR_{537} | — | January 28, 2015 | Haleakala | Pan-STARRS 1 | VER | 3.2 km | MPC · JPL |
| 536046 | 2015 BS_{537} | — | November 3, 2007 | Mount Lemmon | Mount Lemmon Survey | · | 2.8 km | MPC · JPL |
| 536047 | 2015 BU_{537} | — | January 16, 2015 | Haleakala | Pan-STARRS 1 | · | 1.4 km | MPC · JPL |
| 536048 | 2015 BV_{537} | — | November 1, 2013 | Mount Lemmon | Mount Lemmon Survey | PAD | 1.7 km | MPC · JPL |
| 536049 | 2015 BX_{537} | — | March 14, 2007 | Mount Lemmon | Mount Lemmon Survey | · | 760 m | MPC · JPL |
| 536050 | 2015 BA_{538} | — | February 10, 2007 | Mount Lemmon | Mount Lemmon Survey | · | 1.3 km | MPC · JPL |
| 536051 | 2015 BB_{538} | — | March 15, 2008 | Mount Lemmon | Mount Lemmon Survey | · | 910 m | MPC · JPL |
| 536052 | 2015 BD_{538} | — | January 27, 2007 | Mount Lemmon | Mount Lemmon Survey | MAR | 1.0 km | MPC · JPL |
| 536053 | 2015 BF_{538} | — | March 2, 2011 | Kitt Peak | Spacewatch | · | 1.0 km | MPC · JPL |
| 536054 | 2015 BH_{538} | — | January 23, 2015 | Haleakala | Pan-STARRS 1 | MAS | 710 m | MPC · JPL |
| 536055 | 2015 BJ_{538} | — | January 28, 2007 | Kitt Peak | Spacewatch | V | 610 m | MPC · JPL |
| 536056 | 2015 BK_{538} | — | February 1, 2009 | Kitt Peak | Spacewatch | · | 2.6 km | MPC · JPL |
| 536057 | 2015 BL_{538} | — | August 14, 2012 | Haleakala | Pan-STARRS 1 | · | 2.1 km | MPC · JPL |
| 536058 | 2015 BM_{538} | — | January 26, 2015 | Haleakala | Pan-STARRS 1 | · | 820 m | MPC · JPL |
| 536059 | 2015 BN_{538} | — | December 26, 2014 | Haleakala | Pan-STARRS 1 | · | 830 m | MPC · JPL |
| 536060 | 2015 BO_{538} | — | February 25, 2007 | Mount Lemmon | Mount Lemmon Survey | · | 750 m | MPC · JPL |
| 536061 | 2015 BP_{538} | — | May 15, 2012 | Haleakala | Pan-STARRS 1 | V | 540 m | MPC · JPL |
| 536062 | 2015 BQ_{538} | — | March 19, 2010 | Mount Lemmon | Mount Lemmon Survey | · | 1.9 km | MPC · JPL |
| 536063 | 2015 BS_{538} | — | August 26, 2012 | Haleakala | Pan-STARRS 1 | · | 2.5 km | MPC · JPL |
| 536064 | 2015 BV_{538} | — | October 14, 2012 | Catalina | CSS | EOS | 2.2 km | MPC · JPL |
| 536065 | 2015 BW_{538} | — | April 24, 2006 | Kitt Peak | Spacewatch | · | 2.7 km | MPC · JPL |
| 536066 | 2015 BZ_{538} | — | March 10, 2005 | Mount Lemmon | Mount Lemmon Survey | · | 1.5 km | MPC · JPL |
| 536067 | 2015 BG_{539} | — | April 5, 2010 | Mount Lemmon | Mount Lemmon Survey | · | 2.8 km | MPC · JPL |
| 536068 | 2015 BH_{539} | — | December 28, 2014 | Mount Lemmon | Mount Lemmon Survey | · | 1.9 km | MPC · JPL |
| 536069 | 2015 BJ_{539} | — | April 7, 2007 | Mount Lemmon | Mount Lemmon Survey | · | 1.3 km | MPC · JPL |
| 536070 | 2015 BL_{539} | — | October 15, 2007 | Mount Lemmon | Mount Lemmon Survey | · | 3.1 km | MPC · JPL |
| 536071 | 2015 BR_{539} | — | August 25, 2012 | Kitt Peak | Spacewatch | · | 3.0 km | MPC · JPL |
| 536072 | 2015 BS_{539} | — | January 21, 2015 | Haleakala | Pan-STARRS 1 | · | 2.3 km | MPC · JPL |
| 536073 | 2015 BT_{539} | — | April 14, 2011 | Mount Lemmon | Mount Lemmon Survey | MAR | 760 m | MPC · JPL |
| 536074 | 2015 BW_{539} | — | March 25, 2007 | Mount Lemmon | Mount Lemmon Survey | · | 1.4 km | MPC · JPL |
| 536075 | 2015 BZ_{539} | — | September 8, 2001 | Socorro | LINEAR | · | 3.2 km | MPC · JPL |
| 536076 | 2015 BA_{540} | — | August 12, 2012 | Catalina | CSS | BRA | 1.3 km | MPC · JPL |
| 536077 | 2015 BB_{540} | — | October 8, 2007 | Catalina | CSS | · | 2.3 km | MPC · JPL |
| 536078 | 2015 BC_{540} | — | December 4, 2007 | Mount Lemmon | Mount Lemmon Survey | · | 2.6 km | MPC · JPL |
| 536079 | 2015 BD_{540} | — | October 30, 2007 | Mount Lemmon | Mount Lemmon Survey | · | 2.5 km | MPC · JPL |
| 536080 | 2015 BE_{540} | — | October 23, 2012 | Kitt Peak | Spacewatch | · | 1.9 km | MPC · JPL |
| 536081 | 2015 BG_{540} | — | May 23, 2011 | Mount Lemmon | Mount Lemmon Survey | EOS | 1.7 km | MPC · JPL |
| 536082 | 2015 BJ_{540} | — | August 26, 2012 | Haleakala | Pan-STARRS 1 | · | 2.5 km | MPC · JPL |
| 536083 | 2015 BK_{540} | — | August 10, 2012 | Kitt Peak | Spacewatch | · | 2.2 km | MPC · JPL |
| 536084 | 2015 BL_{540} | — | September 17, 2012 | Mount Lemmon | Mount Lemmon Survey | · | 2.5 km | MPC · JPL |
| 536085 | 2015 BM_{540} | — | December 7, 2013 | Haleakala | Pan-STARRS 1 | EOS | 1.5 km | MPC · JPL |
| 536086 | 2015 BN_{540} | — | January 23, 2015 | Haleakala | Pan-STARRS 1 | · | 2.8 km | MPC · JPL |
| 536087 | 2015 BO_{540} | — | November 8, 2008 | Kitt Peak | Spacewatch | · | 1.8 km | MPC · JPL |
| 536088 | 2015 BQ_{540} | — | November 8, 2007 | Kitt Peak | Spacewatch | · | 3.2 km | MPC · JPL |
| 536089 | 2015 BR_{540} | — | April 9, 2010 | Mount Lemmon | Mount Lemmon Survey | EMA | 2.4 km | MPC · JPL |
| 536090 | 2015 BS_{540} | — | March 10, 2005 | Anderson Mesa | LONEOS | · | 2.5 km | MPC · JPL |
| 536091 | 2015 BW_{540} | — | January 24, 2015 | Haleakala | Pan-STARRS 1 | · | 2.6 km | MPC · JPL |
| 536092 | 2015 BB_{541} | — | January 28, 2015 | Haleakala | Pan-STARRS 1 | VER | 3.2 km | MPC · JPL |
| 536093 | 2015 BC_{541} | — | October 12, 2007 | Mount Lemmon | Mount Lemmon Survey | · | 2.5 km | MPC · JPL |
| 536094 | 2015 BE_{541} | — | November 17, 2007 | Mount Lemmon | Mount Lemmon Survey | · | 3.0 km | MPC · JPL |
| 536095 | 2015 BG_{541} | — | January 28, 2015 | Haleakala | Pan-STARRS 1 | · | 2.7 km | MPC · JPL |
| 536096 | 2015 BH_{541} | — | January 28, 2015 | Haleakala | Pan-STARRS 1 | · | 1.6 km | MPC · JPL |
| 536097 | 2015 BK_{541} | — | January 28, 2015 | Haleakala | Pan-STARRS 1 | EOS | 1.7 km | MPC · JPL |
| 536098 | 2015 BN_{541} | — | January 29, 2015 | Haleakala | Pan-STARRS 1 | (5) | 890 m | MPC · JPL |
| 536099 | 2015 BO_{541} | — | September 10, 2007 | Mount Lemmon | Mount Lemmon Survey | · | 1.8 km | MPC · JPL |
| 536100 | 2015 BS_{541} | — | January 4, 2014 | Haleakala | Pan-STARRS 1 | EOS | 1.8 km | MPC · JPL |

== 536101–536200 ==
back to top

| Designation | | | Discovery | | | Properties | | Ref |
| Permanent | Provisional | Named after | Date | Site | Discoverer(s) | Category | Diam. | Ref |
|---|---|---|---|---|---|---|---|---|
| 536101 | 2015 BT_{541} | — | April 4, 2010 | Catalina | CSS | · | 3.7 km | MPC · JPL |
| 536102 | 2015 BU_{541} | — | April 29, 2008 | Mount Lemmon | Mount Lemmon Survey | V | 510 m | MPC · JPL |
| 536103 | 2015 BW_{541} | — | January 2, 2011 | Mount Lemmon | Mount Lemmon Survey | EUN | 1.2 km | MPC · JPL |
| 536104 | 2015 BY_{541} | — | January 22, 2015 | Haleakala | Pan-STARRS 1 | · | 750 m | MPC · JPL |
| 536105 | 2015 BB_{542} | — | July 2, 2008 | Kitt Peak | Spacewatch | · | 1.4 km | MPC · JPL |
| 536106 | 2015 BC_{542} | — | February 8, 2011 | Mount Lemmon | Mount Lemmon Survey | · | 1.2 km | MPC · JPL |
| 536107 | 2015 BD_{542} | — | April 24, 2008 | Mount Lemmon | Mount Lemmon Survey | · | 1.2 km | MPC · JPL |
| 536108 | 2015 BF_{542} | — | February 3, 2009 | Mount Lemmon | Mount Lemmon Survey | · | 3.1 km | MPC · JPL |
| 536109 | 2015 BM_{542} | — | November 4, 2007 | Kitt Peak | Spacewatch | VER | 3.0 km | MPC · JPL |
| 536110 | 2015 BN_{542} | — | January 26, 2015 | Haleakala | Pan-STARRS 1 | URS | 2.7 km | MPC · JPL |
| 536111 | 2015 BO_{542} | — | December 25, 2003 | Kitt Peak | Spacewatch | · | 740 m | MPC · JPL |
| 536112 | 2015 BQ_{542} | — | September 9, 2013 | Haleakala | Pan-STARRS 1 | · | 1.1 km | MPC · JPL |
| 536113 | 2015 BT_{542} | — | March 2, 2009 | Mount Lemmon | Mount Lemmon Survey | · | 3.2 km | MPC · JPL |
| 536114 | 2015 BZ_{542} | — | January 17, 2015 | Haleakala | Pan-STARRS 1 | · | 1.5 km | MPC · JPL |
| 536115 | 2015 BU_{543} | — | October 2, 2013 | Mount Lemmon | Mount Lemmon Survey | · | 1.4 km | MPC · JPL |
| 536116 | 2015 BA_{544} | — | September 15, 2013 | Haleakala | Pan-STARRS 1 | AGN | 1.1 km | MPC · JPL |
| 536117 | 2015 BE_{544} | — | September 25, 2008 | Mount Lemmon | Mount Lemmon Survey | · | 1.4 km | MPC · JPL |
| 536118 | 2015 BB_{545} | — | December 5, 2008 | Mount Lemmon | Mount Lemmon Survey | · | 2.8 km | MPC · JPL |
| 536119 | 2015 BM_{545} | — | November 8, 2013 | Mount Lemmon | Mount Lemmon Survey | · | 1.8 km | MPC · JPL |
| 536120 | 2015 BT_{545} | — | September 21, 2009 | Mount Lemmon | Mount Lemmon Survey | · | 1.2 km | MPC · JPL |
| 536121 | 2015 BY_{545} | — | March 1, 2009 | Kitt Peak | Spacewatch | · | 2.8 km | MPC · JPL |
| 536122 | 2015 BZ_{545} | — | August 25, 2012 | Kitt Peak | Spacewatch | · | 3.0 km | MPC · JPL |
| 536123 | 2015 BA_{546} | — | March 29, 2009 | Catalina | CSS | · | 2.7 km | MPC · JPL |
| 536124 | 2015 BB_{546} | — | December 26, 2013 | Mount Lemmon | Mount Lemmon Survey | · | 2.5 km | MPC · JPL |
| 536125 | 2015 BE_{546} | — | November 7, 2007 | Catalina | CSS | EOS | 2.0 km | MPC · JPL |
| 536126 | 2015 BF_{546} | — | February 5, 2000 | Kitt Peak | Spacewatch | V | 560 m | MPC · JPL |
| 536127 | 2015 BM_{546} | — | November 2, 2013 | Mount Lemmon | Mount Lemmon Survey | · | 1.4 km | MPC · JPL |
| 536128 | 2015 BR_{546} | — | February 25, 2011 | Kitt Peak | Spacewatch | · | 1.6 km | MPC · JPL |
| 536129 | 2015 BV_{546} | — | November 18, 2009 | Mount Lemmon | Mount Lemmon Survey | · | 1.6 km | MPC · JPL |
| 536130 | 2015 BX_{546} | — | October 3, 2013 | Haleakala | Pan-STARRS 1 | · | 1.5 km | MPC · JPL |
| 536131 | 2015 BC_{547} | — | December 8, 2010 | Mount Lemmon | Mount Lemmon Survey | · | 960 m | MPC · JPL |
| 536132 | 2015 BD_{547} | — | October 27, 2008 | Kitt Peak | Spacewatch | AGN | 1.1 km | MPC · JPL |
| 536133 | 2015 BF_{547} | — | January 25, 2015 | Haleakala | Pan-STARRS 1 | EUN | 990 m | MPC · JPL |
| 536134 | 2015 BG_{547} | — | March 13, 2011 | Mount Lemmon | Mount Lemmon Survey | · | 1.5 km | MPC · JPL |
| 536135 | 2015 BH_{547} | — | December 19, 2009 | Mount Lemmon | Mount Lemmon Survey | · | 2.1 km | MPC · JPL |
| 536136 | 2015 BM_{547} | — | January 29, 2015 | Haleakala | Pan-STARRS 1 | · | 1.2 km | MPC · JPL |
| 536137 | 2015 BO_{547} | — | November 16, 2006 | Mount Lemmon | Mount Lemmon Survey | · | 3.8 km | MPC · JPL |
| 536138 | 2015 BW_{547} | — | April 5, 2016 | Haleakala | Pan-STARRS 1 | · | 2.3 km | MPC · JPL |
| 536139 | 2015 BE_{548} | — | August 18, 2009 | Kitt Peak | Spacewatch | · | 1.4 km | MPC · JPL |
| 536140 | 2015 BL_{548} | — | December 24, 2005 | Kitt Peak | Spacewatch | · | 2.0 km | MPC · JPL |
| 536141 | 2015 BP_{548} | — | December 22, 2003 | Kitt Peak | Spacewatch | · | 900 m | MPC · JPL |
| 536142 | 2015 BQ_{548} | — | March 15, 2010 | Catalina | CSS | · | 1.7 km | MPC · JPL |
| 536143 | 2015 BT_{548} | — | December 30, 2005 | Kitt Peak | Spacewatch | · | 1.4 km | MPC · JPL |
| 536144 | 2015 BU_{548} | — | November 25, 2009 | Kitt Peak | Spacewatch | WIT | 890 m | MPC · JPL |
| 536145 | 2015 BW_{548} | — | March 17, 1996 | Kitt Peak | Spacewatch | · | 2.2 km | MPC · JPL |
| 536146 | 2015 BZ_{548} | — | November 3, 2007 | Mount Lemmon | Mount Lemmon Survey | V | 630 m | MPC · JPL |
| 536147 | 2015 BC_{549} | — | July 25, 2006 | Mount Lemmon | Mount Lemmon Survey | · | 3.4 km | MPC · JPL |
| 536148 | 2015 BD_{549} | — | November 1, 2007 | Kitt Peak | Spacewatch | · | 540 m | MPC · JPL |
| 536149 | 2015 BJ_{549} | — | March 23, 2003 | Kitt Peak | Spacewatch | · | 1.3 km | MPC · JPL |
| 536150 | 2015 BO_{549} | — | September 22, 2008 | Catalina | CSS | · | 2.1 km | MPC · JPL |
| 536151 | 2015 BP_{549} | — | January 26, 2006 | Kitt Peak | Spacewatch | · | 1.6 km | MPC · JPL |
| 536152 | 2015 BY_{549} | — | September 9, 2007 | Kitt Peak | Spacewatch | · | 3.5 km | MPC · JPL |
| 536153 | 2015 BE_{550} | — | September 13, 2013 | Catalina | CSS | EUN | 1.2 km | MPC · JPL |
| 536154 | 2015 BH_{550} | — | September 6, 2008 | Mount Lemmon | Mount Lemmon Survey | · | 2.0 km | MPC · JPL |
| 536155 | 2015 BJ_{550} | — | November 9, 2013 | Haleakala | Pan-STARRS 1 | EUN | 1.1 km | MPC · JPL |
| 536156 | 2015 BK_{550} | — | January 17, 2015 | Mount Lemmon | Mount Lemmon Survey | EOS | 2.0 km | MPC · JPL |
| 536157 | 2015 BL_{550} | — | January 7, 2006 | Kitt Peak | Spacewatch | · | 1.7 km | MPC · JPL |
| 536158 | 2015 BN_{550} | — | March 29, 2011 | Mount Lemmon | Mount Lemmon Survey | · | 1.5 km | MPC · JPL |
| 536159 | 2015 BP_{550} | — | April 5, 2011 | Kitt Peak | Spacewatch | · | 1.9 km | MPC · JPL |
| 536160 | 2015 BR_{550} | — | March 16, 2007 | Kitt Peak | Spacewatch | (5) | 950 m | MPC · JPL |
| 536161 | 2015 BS_{550} | — | January 8, 2011 | Mount Lemmon | Mount Lemmon Survey | · | 1.2 km | MPC · JPL |
| 536162 | 2015 BT_{550} | — | October 13, 2005 | Kitt Peak | Spacewatch | · | 980 m | MPC · JPL |
| 536163 | 2015 BW_{550} | — | September 26, 2006 | Kitt Peak | Spacewatch | · | 2.5 km | MPC · JPL |
| 536164 | 2015 BA_{551} | — | May 12, 2011 | Mount Lemmon | Mount Lemmon Survey | · | 1.4 km | MPC · JPL |
| 536165 | 2015 BB_{551} | — | December 31, 2013 | Haleakala | Pan-STARRS 1 | · | 2.9 km | MPC · JPL |
| 536166 | 2015 BD_{551} | — | October 26, 2009 | Kitt Peak | Spacewatch | · | 880 m | MPC · JPL |
| 536167 | 2015 BF_{551} | — | April 19, 2007 | Kitt Peak | Spacewatch | EUN | 770 m | MPC · JPL |
| 536168 | 2015 BJ_{551} | — | September 17, 2003 | Kitt Peak | Spacewatch | · | 1.7 km | MPC · JPL |
| 536169 | 2015 BM_{551} | — | September 28, 2003 | Kitt Peak | Spacewatch | · | 2.4 km | MPC · JPL |
| 536170 | 2015 BN_{551} | — | September 10, 2004 | Kitt Peak | Spacewatch | · | 1.7 km | MPC · JPL |
| 536171 | 2015 BO_{551} | — | March 6, 2011 | Kitt Peak | Spacewatch | · | 770 m | MPC · JPL |
| 536172 | 2015 BQ_{551} | — | January 18, 2008 | Kitt Peak | Spacewatch | · | 880 m | MPC · JPL |
| 536173 | 2015 BR_{551} | — | September 23, 2008 | Kitt Peak | Spacewatch | · | 1.2 km | MPC · JPL |
| 536174 | 2015 BT_{551} | — | March 21, 2004 | Kitt Peak | Spacewatch | · | 2.9 km | MPC · JPL |
| 536175 | 2015 BU_{551} | — | October 20, 2006 | Mount Lemmon | Mount Lemmon Survey | CYB | 3.6 km | MPC · JPL |
| 536176 | 2015 BV_{551} | — | September 28, 2008 | Catalina | CSS | EUN | 1.3 km | MPC · JPL |
| 536177 | 2015 BW_{551} | — | April 7, 2007 | Mount Lemmon | Mount Lemmon Survey | · | 870 m | MPC · JPL |
| 536178 | 2015 BX_{551} | — | January 28, 2015 | Haleakala | Pan-STARRS 1 | · | 1.7 km | MPC · JPL |
| 536179 | 2015 BY_{551} | — | May 21, 2011 | Mount Lemmon | Mount Lemmon Survey | · | 1.1 km | MPC · JPL |
| 536180 | 2015 BA_{552} | — | October 28, 2008 | Kitt Peak | Spacewatch | · | 2.0 km | MPC · JPL |
| 536181 | 2015 BB_{552} | — | January 16, 2015 | Haleakala | Pan-STARRS 1 | EOS | 1.4 km | MPC · JPL |
| 536182 | 2015 BF_{552} | — | October 28, 2013 | Catalina | CSS | · | 3.1 km | MPC · JPL |
| 536183 | 2015 BK_{552} | — | January 17, 2015 | Haleakala | Pan-STARRS 1 | · | 1.1 km | MPC · JPL |
| 536184 | 2015 BQ_{552} | — | October 28, 2005 | Catalina | CSS | EUN | 1.0 km | MPC · JPL |
| 536185 | 2015 BT_{552} | — | January 20, 2015 | Haleakala | Pan-STARRS 1 | AGN | 790 m | MPC · JPL |
| 536186 | 2015 BQ_{553} | — | March 18, 2005 | Catalina | CSS | · | 750 m | MPC · JPL |
| 536187 | 2015 BW_{553} | — | December 29, 2005 | Mount Lemmon | Mount Lemmon Survey | · | 1.9 km | MPC · JPL |
| 536188 | 2015 BU_{554} | — | October 7, 2004 | Kitt Peak | Spacewatch | · | 1.5 km | MPC · JPL |
| 536189 | 2015 BH_{556} | — | August 20, 1995 | Kitt Peak | Spacewatch | · | 1.7 km | MPC · JPL |
| 536190 | 2015 BK_{556} | — | October 1, 2003 | Kitt Peak | Spacewatch | · | 2.3 km | MPC · JPL |
| 536191 | 2015 BO_{556} | — | November 27, 2009 | Mount Lemmon | Mount Lemmon Survey | · | 1.7 km | MPC · JPL |
| 536192 | 2015 BG_{557} | — | January 4, 2011 | Mount Lemmon | Mount Lemmon Survey | NYS | 860 m | MPC · JPL |
| 536193 | 2015 BL_{557} | — | April 4, 2011 | Mount Lemmon | Mount Lemmon Survey | · | 1.2 km | MPC · JPL |
| 536194 | 2015 BO_{557} | — | October 20, 2007 | Mount Lemmon | Mount Lemmon Survey | · | 2.1 km | MPC · JPL |
| 536195 | 2015 BC_{558} | — | November 3, 2005 | Kitt Peak | Spacewatch | · | 1.1 km | MPC · JPL |
| 536196 | 2015 BZ_{558} | — | November 6, 2005 | Mount Lemmon | Mount Lemmon Survey | · | 1.4 km | MPC · JPL |
| 536197 | 2015 BD_{559} | — | November 12, 2013 | Haleakala | Pan-STARRS 1 | · | 2.6 km | MPC · JPL |
| 536198 | 2015 BB_{560} | — | February 27, 2008 | Mount Lemmon | Mount Lemmon Survey | · | 860 m | MPC · JPL |
| 536199 | 2015 BH_{560} | — | February 13, 2010 | WISE | WISE | · | 2.8 km | MPC · JPL |
| 536200 | 2015 BH_{565} | — | October 3, 2010 | Catalina | CSS | · | 840 m | MPC · JPL |

== 536201–536300 ==
back to top

| Designation | | | Discovery | | | Properties | | Ref |
| Permanent | Provisional | Named after | Date | Site | Discoverer(s) | Category | Diam. | Ref |
|---|---|---|---|---|---|---|---|---|
| 536201 | 2015 BJ_{565} | — | November 7, 2007 | Kitt Peak | Spacewatch | · | 650 m | MPC · JPL |
| 536202 | 2015 BL_{565} | — | October 17, 2007 | Mount Lemmon | Mount Lemmon Survey | · | 520 m | MPC · JPL |
| 536203 | 2015 BM_{565} | — | January 18, 2015 | Kitt Peak | Spacewatch | V | 620 m | MPC · JPL |
| 536204 | 2015 BO_{565} | — | January 23, 2006 | Mount Lemmon | Mount Lemmon Survey | HNS | 1.2 km | MPC · JPL |
| 536205 | 2015 BT_{565} | — | November 12, 2007 | Mount Lemmon | Mount Lemmon Survey | EOS | 1.6 km | MPC · JPL |
| 536206 | 2015 BW_{565} | — | January 23, 2015 | Haleakala | Pan-STARRS 1 | · | 2.5 km | MPC · JPL |
| 536207 | 2015 BX_{565} | — | January 28, 2015 | Haleakala | Pan-STARRS 1 | · | 2.4 km | MPC · JPL |
| 536208 | 2015 CC | — | October 24, 2005 | Kitt Peak | Spacewatch | · | 1.3 km | MPC · JPL |
| 536209 | 2015 CV_{1} | — | January 10, 2011 | Mount Lemmon | Mount Lemmon Survey | · | 980 m | MPC · JPL |
| 536210 | 2015 CC_{2} | — | February 10, 2011 | Mount Lemmon | Mount Lemmon Survey | · | 1.2 km | MPC · JPL |
| 536211 | 2015 CA_{5} | — | January 13, 2005 | Kitt Peak | Spacewatch | · | 2.3 km | MPC · JPL |
| 536212 | 2015 CW_{5} | — | December 13, 2010 | Mount Lemmon | Mount Lemmon Survey | · | 760 m | MPC · JPL |
| 536213 | 2015 CF_{6} | — | January 27, 2006 | Anderson Mesa | LONEOS | GAL | 1.4 km | MPC · JPL |
| 536214 | 2015 CF_{10} | — | April 18, 2010 | WISE | WISE | · | 2.5 km | MPC · JPL |
| 536215 | 2015 CH_{10} | — | March 4, 2011 | Catalina | CSS | EUN | 1.2 km | MPC · JPL |
| 536216 | 2015 CS_{11} | — | November 11, 2009 | Kitt Peak | Spacewatch | · | 1.4 km | MPC · JPL |
| 536217 | 2015 CT_{11} | — | February 4, 2005 | Kitt Peak | Spacewatch | KOR | 1.5 km | MPC · JPL |
| 536218 | 2015 CG_{12} | — | January 29, 2015 | Haleakala | Pan-STARRS 1 | · | 2.1 km | MPC · JPL |
| 536219 | 2015 CR_{12} | — | July 13, 2013 | Mount Lemmon | Mount Lemmon Survey | HNS | 1.1 km | MPC · JPL |
| 536220 | 2015 CE_{14} | — | November 25, 2013 | Haleakala | Pan-STARRS 1 | · | 2.9 km | MPC · JPL |
| 536221 | 2015 CW_{14} | — | March 13, 2010 | WISE | WISE | · | 3.1 km | MPC · JPL |
| 536222 | 2015 CH_{15} | — | December 11, 2010 | Mount Lemmon | Mount Lemmon Survey | · | 1.7 km | MPC · JPL |
| 536223 | 2015 CO_{15} | — | March 17, 2004 | Kitt Peak | Spacewatch | · | 1.2 km | MPC · JPL |
| 536224 | 2015 CZ_{15} | — | September 5, 2008 | Kitt Peak | Spacewatch | NEM | 2.2 km | MPC · JPL |
| 536225 | 2015 CJ_{16} | — | November 5, 2010 | Mount Lemmon | Mount Lemmon Survey | · | 1.1 km | MPC · JPL |
| 536226 | 2015 CM_{16} | — | April 13, 2008 | Kitt Peak | Spacewatch | · | 720 m | MPC · JPL |
| 536227 | 2015 CU_{18} | — | November 7, 2010 | Mount Lemmon | Mount Lemmon Survey | · | 1.0 km | MPC · JPL |
| 536228 | 2015 CM_{19} | — | January 16, 2015 | Haleakala | Pan-STARRS 1 | · | 1.1 km | MPC · JPL |
| 536229 | 2015 CQ_{20} | — | August 25, 2004 | Kitt Peak | Spacewatch | · | 2.0 km | MPC · JPL |
| 536230 | 2015 CG_{21} | — | October 29, 2008 | Kitt Peak | Spacewatch | · | 1.5 km | MPC · JPL |
| 536231 | 2015 CN_{22} | — | October 26, 2009 | Kitt Peak | Spacewatch | · | 1.3 km | MPC · JPL |
| 536232 | 2015 CJ_{23} | — | January 21, 2015 | Haleakala | Pan-STARRS 1 | · | 1.1 km | MPC · JPL |
| 536233 | 2015 CK_{23} | — | March 9, 2011 | Kitt Peak | Spacewatch | · | 1.3 km | MPC · JPL |
| 536234 | 2015 CM_{23} | — | January 21, 2015 | Haleakala | Pan-STARRS 1 | · | 2.6 km | MPC · JPL |
| 536235 | 2015 CX_{23} | — | January 9, 2011 | Mount Lemmon | Mount Lemmon Survey | · | 820 m | MPC · JPL |
| 536236 | 2015 CH_{24} | — | March 12, 2007 | Mount Lemmon | Mount Lemmon Survey | · | 690 m | MPC · JPL |
| 536237 | 2015 CJ_{24} | — | May 23, 2011 | Mount Lemmon | Mount Lemmon Survey | · | 1.2 km | MPC · JPL |
| 536238 | 2015 CN_{25} | — | November 22, 2014 | Mount Lemmon | Mount Lemmon Survey | HNS | 1.1 km | MPC · JPL |
| 536239 | 2015 CN_{26} | — | December 28, 2014 | Mount Lemmon | Mount Lemmon Survey | · | 1.5 km | MPC · JPL |
| 536240 | 2015 CR_{26} | — | October 15, 2009 | Catalina | CSS | · | 1.6 km | MPC · JPL |
| 536241 | 2015 CS_{26} | — | December 20, 2009 | Mount Lemmon | Mount Lemmon Survey | 615 | 1.4 km | MPC · JPL |
| 536242 | 2015 CJ_{28} | — | January 30, 2011 | Kitt Peak | Spacewatch | · | 920 m | MPC · JPL |
| 536243 | 2015 CF_{29} | — | October 28, 2006 | Mount Lemmon | Mount Lemmon Survey | NYS | 890 m | MPC · JPL |
| 536244 | 2015 CR_{29} | — | November 18, 2009 | Kitt Peak | Spacewatch | · | 1.2 km | MPC · JPL |
| 536245 | 2015 CH_{33} | — | April 3, 2011 | Haleakala | Pan-STARRS 1 | · | 1.4 km | MPC · JPL |
| 536246 | 2015 CE_{36} | — | April 12, 2011 | Catalina | CSS | · | 2.0 km | MPC · JPL |
| 536247 | 2015 CH_{36} | — | July 30, 2005 | Palomar | NEAT | · | 1.5 km | MPC · JPL |
| 536248 | 2015 CX_{36} | — | January 13, 2010 | Mount Lemmon | Mount Lemmon Survey | · | 2.4 km | MPC · JPL |
| 536249 | 2015 CG_{37} | — | April 27, 2012 | Haleakala | Pan-STARRS 1 | · | 1.1 km | MPC · JPL |
| 536250 | 2015 CS_{37} | — | September 25, 2009 | Catalina | CSS | · | 1.7 km | MPC · JPL |
| 536251 | 2015 CZ_{37} | — | February 12, 2004 | Kitt Peak | Spacewatch | NYS | 670 m | MPC · JPL |
| 536252 | 2015 CB_{38} | — | April 9, 2010 | Mount Lemmon | Mount Lemmon Survey | · | 2.2 km | MPC · JPL |
| 536253 | 2015 CW_{39} | — | January 4, 2014 | Mount Lemmon | Mount Lemmon Survey | · | 2.6 km | MPC · JPL |
| 536254 | 2015 CZ_{41} | — | April 4, 2011 | Mount Lemmon | Mount Lemmon Survey | · | 970 m | MPC · JPL |
| 536255 | 2015 CM_{42} | — | May 24, 2007 | Mount Lemmon | Mount Lemmon Survey | · | 2.0 km | MPC · JPL |
| 536256 | 2015 CR_{44} | — | April 17, 2005 | Kitt Peak | Spacewatch | · | 2.4 km | MPC · JPL |
| 536257 | 2015 CA_{45} | — | September 9, 2008 | Mount Lemmon | Mount Lemmon Survey | · | 1.8 km | MPC · JPL |
| 536258 | 2015 CJ_{45} | — | January 29, 2015 | Haleakala | Pan-STARRS 1 | · | 1.5 km | MPC · JPL |
| 536259 | 2015 CQ_{45} | — | February 2, 2009 | Mount Lemmon | Mount Lemmon Survey | · | 2.8 km | MPC · JPL |
| 536260 | 2015 CR_{45} | — | September 15, 2007 | Mount Lemmon | Mount Lemmon Survey | EOS | 1.7 km | MPC · JPL |
| 536261 | 2015 CY_{45} | — | April 2, 2011 | Mount Lemmon | Mount Lemmon Survey | · | 1.5 km | MPC · JPL |
| 536262 | 2015 CP_{46} | — | February 15, 2015 | Haleakala | Pan-STARRS 1 | · | 1.0 km | MPC · JPL |
| 536263 | 2015 CM_{47} | — | August 20, 2006 | Kitt Peak | Spacewatch | · | 3.3 km | MPC · JPL |
| 536264 | 2015 CX_{47} | — | January 18, 2004 | Kitt Peak | Spacewatch | · | 3.0 km | MPC · JPL |
| 536265 | 2015 CF_{48} | — | April 2, 2011 | Haleakala | Pan-STARRS 1 | · | 1.8 km | MPC · JPL |
| 536266 | 2015 CX_{48} | — | October 10, 2005 | Catalina | CSS | · | 1.2 km | MPC · JPL |
| 536267 | 2015 CY_{48} | — | March 19, 2010 | Mount Lemmon | Mount Lemmon Survey | · | 2.1 km | MPC · JPL |
| 536268 | 2015 CC_{49} | — | January 27, 2011 | Kitt Peak | Spacewatch | · | 930 m | MPC · JPL |
| 536269 | 2015 CT_{49} | — | November 26, 2014 | Haleakala | Pan-STARRS 1 | · | 1.9 km | MPC · JPL |
| 536270 | 2015 CV_{51} | — | February 20, 2006 | Kitt Peak | Spacewatch | · | 1.8 km | MPC · JPL |
| 536271 | 2015 CZ_{51} | — | September 24, 2013 | Mount Lemmon | Mount Lemmon Survey | · | 920 m | MPC · JPL |
| 536272 | 2015 CN_{52} | — | February 25, 2011 | Mount Lemmon | Mount Lemmon Survey | · | 1.3 km | MPC · JPL |
| 536273 | 2015 CR_{52} | — | February 9, 2010 | Kitt Peak | Spacewatch | KOR | 1.5 km | MPC · JPL |
| 536274 | 2015 CY_{52} | — | March 29, 2011 | Kitt Peak | Spacewatch | · | 900 m | MPC · JPL |
| 536275 | 2015 CP_{53} | — | April 26, 2011 | Mount Lemmon | Mount Lemmon Survey | · | 1.3 km | MPC · JPL |
| 536276 | 2015 CF_{54} | — | May 24, 1993 | Kitt Peak | Spacewatch | · | 3.1 km | MPC · JPL |
| 536277 | 2015 CS_{54} | — | September 18, 2003 | Kitt Peak | Spacewatch | · | 1.8 km | MPC · JPL |
| 536278 | 2015 CT_{54} | — | September 12, 2007 | Mount Lemmon | Mount Lemmon Survey | · | 2.1 km | MPC · JPL |
| 536279 | 2015 CB_{55} | — | January 30, 2010 | WISE | WISE | · | 1.9 km | MPC · JPL |
| 536280 | 2015 CF_{55} | — | November 21, 2008 | Kitt Peak | Spacewatch | · | 1.9 km | MPC · JPL |
| 536281 | 2015 CF_{56} | — | February 2, 2006 | Kitt Peak | Spacewatch | · | 1.8 km | MPC · JPL |
| 536282 | 2015 CE_{58} | — | October 9, 2008 | Catalina | CSS | · | 3.0 km | MPC · JPL |
| 536283 | 2015 CV_{58} | — | November 20, 2003 | Kitt Peak | Spacewatch | · | 730 m | MPC · JPL |
| 536284 | 2015 CG_{59} | — | August 14, 2012 | Haleakala | Pan-STARRS 1 | · | 2.7 km | MPC · JPL |
| 536285 | 2015 CH_{59} | — | December 13, 2006 | Kitt Peak | Spacewatch | · | 780 m | MPC · JPL |
| 536286 | 2015 CX_{60} | — | April 23, 2011 | Haleakala | Pan-STARRS 1 | · | 2.0 km | MPC · JPL |
| 536287 | 2015 CL_{62} | — | February 12, 2015 | Haleakala | Pan-STARRS 1 | cubewano (hot) | 240 km | MPC · JPL |
| 536288 | 2015 CX_{62} | — | February 12, 2015 | Haleakala | Pan-STARRS 1 | HNS | 820 m | MPC · JPL |
| 536289 | 2015 CA_{63} | — | July 18, 2007 | Mount Lemmon | Mount Lemmon Survey | · | 1.6 km | MPC · JPL |
| 536290 | 2015 CC_{63} | — | October 5, 2013 | Haleakala | Pan-STARRS 1 | · | 1.1 km | MPC · JPL |
| 536291 | 2015 CH_{63} | — | March 27, 2011 | Mount Lemmon | Mount Lemmon Survey | · | 1.5 km | MPC · JPL |
| 536292 | 2015 CR_{63} | — | October 3, 2006 | Mount Lemmon | Mount Lemmon Survey | NYS | 870 m | MPC · JPL |
| 536293 | 2015 CV_{63} | — | November 30, 2008 | Mount Lemmon | Mount Lemmon Survey | · | 1.3 km | MPC · JPL |
| 536294 | 2015 CW_{63} | — | February 1, 2008 | Mount Lemmon | Mount Lemmon Survey | · | 1.1 km | MPC · JPL |
| 536295 | 2015 CC_{64} | — | January 16, 2005 | Kitt Peak | Spacewatch | · | 1.8 km | MPC · JPL |
| 536296 | 2015 CE_{64} | — | January 31, 2006 | Mount Lemmon | Mount Lemmon Survey | (13314) | 1.5 km | MPC · JPL |
| 536297 | 2015 CY_{64} | — | January 20, 2015 | Haleakala | Pan-STARRS 1 | · | 820 m | MPC · JPL |
| 536298 | 2015 CF_{65} | — | November 26, 2014 | Haleakala | Pan-STARRS 1 | (18466) | 2.4 km | MPC · JPL |
| 536299 | 2015 CP_{65} | — | October 28, 2008 | Kitt Peak | Spacewatch | TEL | 1.2 km | MPC · JPL |
| 536300 | 2015 CB_{66} | — | August 26, 2012 | Mount Lemmon | Mount Lemmon Survey | · | 2.4 km | MPC · JPL |

== 536301–536400 ==
back to top

| Designation | | | Discovery | | | Properties | | Ref |
| Permanent | Provisional | Named after | Date | Site | Discoverer(s) | Category | Diam. | Ref |
|---|---|---|---|---|---|---|---|---|
| 536301 | 2015 CG_{66} | — | September 4, 1999 | Kitt Peak | Spacewatch | · | 1.4 km | MPC · JPL |
| 536302 | 2015 CP_{66} | — | March 3, 2009 | Mount Lemmon | Mount Lemmon Survey | THM | 2.4 km | MPC · JPL |
| 536303 | 2015 CS_{66} | — | February 10, 2015 | Mount Lemmon | Mount Lemmon Survey | · | 2.2 km | MPC · JPL |
| 536304 | 2015 CU_{66} | — | September 12, 2007 | Mount Lemmon | Mount Lemmon Survey | · | 3.9 km | MPC · JPL |
| 536305 | 2015 CX_{66} | — | October 10, 2008 | Mount Lemmon | Mount Lemmon Survey | · | 1.9 km | MPC · JPL |
| 536306 | 2015 CA_{67} | — | September 29, 2009 | Mount Lemmon | Mount Lemmon Survey | · | 3.0 km | MPC · JPL |
| 536307 | 2015 CD_{67} | — | September 10, 2013 | Haleakala | Pan-STARRS 1 | · | 1.3 km | MPC · JPL |
| 536308 | 2015 CE_{67} | — | September 24, 2008 | Mount Lemmon | Mount Lemmon Survey | · | 1.5 km | MPC · JPL |
| 536309 | 2015 CG_{67} | — | September 28, 2003 | Kitt Peak | Spacewatch | AGN | 1.4 km | MPC · JPL |
| 536310 | 2015 CJ_{67} | — | January 20, 2015 | Haleakala | Pan-STARRS 1 | · | 1 km | MPC · JPL |
| 536311 | 2015 CN_{68} | — | January 27, 2015 | Haleakala | Pan-STARRS 1 | EUN | 1.0 km | MPC · JPL |
| 536312 | 2015 CU_{68} | — | December 3, 2013 | Haleakala | Pan-STARRS 1 | · | 1.4 km | MPC · JPL |
| 536313 | 2015 CV_{68} | — | February 26, 2011 | Kitt Peak | Spacewatch | (5) | 820 m | MPC · JPL |
| 536314 | 2015 CX_{68} | — | February 11, 2015 | Kitt Peak | Spacewatch | · | 1.0 km | MPC · JPL |
| 536315 | 2015 CY_{68} | — | November 4, 2013 | Mount Lemmon | Mount Lemmon Survey | NYS | 1.1 km | MPC · JPL |
| 536316 | 2015 CJ_{69} | — | January 25, 2015 | Haleakala | Pan-STARRS 1 | · | 2.2 km | MPC · JPL |
| 536317 | 2015 CQ_{69} | — | October 31, 2013 | Mount Lemmon | Mount Lemmon Survey | · | 1.5 km | MPC · JPL |
| 536318 | 2015 CD_{70} | — | January 20, 2015 | Mount Lemmon | Mount Lemmon Survey | · | 2.9 km | MPC · JPL |
| 536319 | 2015 CS_{70} | — | December 27, 2005 | Kitt Peak | Spacewatch | · | 1.6 km | MPC · JPL |
| 536320 | 2015 CV_{70} | — | February 13, 2015 | XuYi | PMO NEO Survey Program | · | 1.7 km | MPC · JPL |
| 536321 | 2015 CX_{70} | — | November 27, 2013 | Haleakala | Pan-STARRS 1 | · | 1.5 km | MPC · JPL |
| 536322 | 2015 DK_{2} | — | February 2, 2008 | Kitt Peak | Spacewatch | · | 850 m | MPC · JPL |
| 536323 | 2015 DW_{6} | — | November 6, 2010 | Mount Lemmon | Mount Lemmon Survey | · | 770 m | MPC · JPL |
| 536324 | 2015 DW_{7} | — | July 9, 2007 | Lulin | LUSS | · | 2.4 km | MPC · JPL |
| 536325 | 2015 DA_{12} | — | April 15, 2008 | Kitt Peak | Spacewatch | · | 1.0 km | MPC · JPL |
| 536326 | 2015 DA_{14} | — | September 6, 2008 | Mount Lemmon | Mount Lemmon Survey | · | 1.6 km | MPC · JPL |
| 536327 | 2015 DM_{15} | — | December 25, 2005 | Kitt Peak | Spacewatch | MIS | 2.0 km | MPC · JPL |
| 536328 | 2015 DY_{15} | — | June 7, 2011 | Mount Lemmon | Mount Lemmon Survey | · | 3.4 km | MPC · JPL |
| 536329 | 2015 DL_{16} | — | January 18, 2015 | Haleakala | Pan-STARRS 1 | · | 960 m | MPC · JPL |
| 536330 | 2015 DQ_{16} | — | December 20, 2004 | Mount Lemmon | Mount Lemmon Survey | NAE | 2.6 km | MPC · JPL |
| 536331 | 2015 DZ_{16} | — | September 6, 2008 | Catalina | CSS | · | 1.7 km | MPC · JPL |
| 536332 | 2015 DB_{17} | — | October 16, 2007 | Catalina | CSS | · | 3.0 km | MPC · JPL |
| 536333 | 2015 DR_{17} | — | April 6, 2011 | Mount Lemmon | Mount Lemmon Survey | PAD | 1.7 km | MPC · JPL |
| 536334 | 2015 DX_{17} | — | September 14, 2007 | Mount Lemmon | Mount Lemmon Survey | · | 2.2 km | MPC · JPL |
| 536335 | 2015 DK_{18} | — | October 8, 2007 | Kitt Peak | Spacewatch | · | 2.2 km | MPC · JPL |
| 536336 | 2015 DP_{19} | — | October 3, 2013 | Mount Lemmon | Mount Lemmon Survey | · | 900 m | MPC · JPL |
| 536337 | 2015 DB_{21} | — | January 7, 2010 | Kitt Peak | Spacewatch | · | 1.3 km | MPC · JPL |
| 536338 | 2015 DC_{22} | — | January 8, 2011 | Mount Lemmon | Mount Lemmon Survey | · | 960 m | MPC · JPL |
| 536339 | 2015 DV_{23} | — | August 22, 1995 | Kitt Peak | Spacewatch | · | 1.7 km | MPC · JPL |
| 536340 | 2015 DP_{24} | — | December 30, 2005 | Mount Lemmon | Mount Lemmon Survey | · | 1.5 km | MPC · JPL |
| 536341 | 2015 DQ_{24} | — | August 17, 2012 | Haleakala | Pan-STARRS 1 | · | 1.1 km | MPC · JPL |
| 536342 | 2015 DQ_{25} | — | January 24, 2015 | Mount Lemmon | Mount Lemmon Survey | EOS | 1.7 km | MPC · JPL |
| 536343 | 2015 DK_{26} | — | January 24, 2015 | Mount Lemmon | Mount Lemmon Survey | · | 1.0 km | MPC · JPL |
| 536344 | 2015 DJ_{27} | — | October 14, 2013 | Mount Lemmon | Mount Lemmon Survey | · | 1.3 km | MPC · JPL |
| 536345 | 2015 DR_{28} | — | August 14, 2013 | Haleakala | Pan-STARRS 1 | · | 1.4 km | MPC · JPL |
| 536346 | 2015 DH_{30} | — | September 12, 2007 | Mount Lemmon | Mount Lemmon Survey | EOS | 1.8 km | MPC · JPL |
| 536347 | 2015 DG_{31} | — | March 10, 2008 | Mount Lemmon | Mount Lemmon Survey | · | 1.8 km | MPC · JPL |
| 536348 | 2015 DM_{31} | — | January 27, 2015 | Haleakala | Pan-STARRS 1 | · | 1.2 km | MPC · JPL |
| 536349 | 2015 DQ_{31} | — | February 23, 2011 | Kitt Peak | Spacewatch | · | 1.6 km | MPC · JPL |
| 536350 | 2015 DV_{31} | — | February 14, 2010 | Mount Lemmon | Mount Lemmon Survey | · | 1.9 km | MPC · JPL |
| 536351 | 2015 DL_{32} | — | November 7, 2008 | Mount Lemmon | Mount Lemmon Survey | · | 1.6 km | MPC · JPL |
| 536352 | 2015 DU_{32} | — | March 13, 2011 | Mount Lemmon | Mount Lemmon Survey | (5) | 950 m | MPC · JPL |
| 536353 | 2015 DY_{32} | — | January 14, 2011 | Kitt Peak | Spacewatch | · | 1.4 km | MPC · JPL |
| 536354 | 2015 DE_{35} | — | August 17, 2012 | Haleakala | Pan-STARRS 1 | EOS | 1.4 km | MPC · JPL |
| 536355 | 2015 DX_{35} | — | January 28, 2011 | Kitt Peak | Spacewatch | · | 1.1 km | MPC · JPL |
| 536356 | 2015 DW_{36} | — | January 31, 2006 | Kitt Peak | Spacewatch | · | 1.5 km | MPC · JPL |
| 536357 | 2015 DQ_{37} | — | September 17, 2006 | Kitt Peak | Spacewatch | · | 1.1 km | MPC · JPL |
| 536358 | 2015 DC_{38} | — | January 21, 2015 | Haleakala | Pan-STARRS 1 | slow | 1.9 km | MPC · JPL |
| 536359 | 2015 DN_{40} | — | November 30, 2005 | Kitt Peak | Spacewatch | · | 1.2 km | MPC · JPL |
| 536360 | 2015 DN_{42} | — | January 27, 2015 | Haleakala | Pan-STARRS 1 | · | 1.2 km | MPC · JPL |
| 536361 | 2015 DV_{44} | — | October 29, 2008 | Kitt Peak | Spacewatch | AGN | 980 m | MPC · JPL |
| 536362 | 2015 DC_{45} | — | May 9, 2004 | Kitt Peak | Spacewatch | · | 1.2 km | MPC · JPL |
| 536363 | 2015 DE_{45} | — | November 20, 2003 | Catalina | CSS | · | 2.3 km | MPC · JPL |
| 536364 | 2015 DL_{45} | — | January 30, 2009 | Kitt Peak | Spacewatch | · | 3.0 km | MPC · JPL |
| 536365 | 2015 DE_{47} | — | January 30, 2011 | Mount Lemmon | Mount Lemmon Survey | · | 930 m | MPC · JPL |
| 536366 | 2015 DW_{47} | — | March 25, 2011 | Kitt Peak | Spacewatch | · | 1.1 km | MPC · JPL |
| 536367 | 2015 DM_{48} | — | January 28, 2006 | Kitt Peak | Spacewatch | · | 1.7 km | MPC · JPL |
| 536368 | 2015 DG_{49} | — | November 9, 2013 | Kitt Peak | Spacewatch | · | 1.6 km | MPC · JPL |
| 536369 | 2015 DA_{50} | — | May 14, 2008 | Mount Lemmon | Mount Lemmon Survey | NYS | 1.0 km | MPC · JPL |
| 536370 | 2015 DP_{50} | — | September 19, 2012 | Mount Lemmon | Mount Lemmon Survey | · | 2.1 km | MPC · JPL |
| 536371 | 2015 DZ_{50} | — | May 2, 2000 | Kitt Peak | Spacewatch | EOS | 1.9 km | MPC · JPL |
| 536372 | 2015 DK_{51} | — | October 22, 2006 | Kitt Peak | Spacewatch | V | 480 m | MPC · JPL |
| 536373 | 2015 DV_{53} | — | November 19, 2004 | Socorro | LINEAR | · | 1.9 km | MPC · JPL |
| 536374 | 2015 DT_{57} | — | January 6, 2010 | Kitt Peak | Spacewatch | KOR | 1.1 km | MPC · JPL |
| 536375 | 2015 DK_{58} | — | February 23, 2007 | Kitt Peak | Spacewatch | · | 830 m | MPC · JPL |
| 536376 | 2015 DB_{66} | — | January 27, 2004 | Kitt Peak | Spacewatch | · | 2.1 km | MPC · JPL |
| 536377 | 2015 DJ_{67} | — | January 20, 2015 | Haleakala | Pan-STARRS 1 | · | 980 m | MPC · JPL |
| 536378 | 2015 DG_{68} | — | January 16, 2004 | Kitt Peak | Spacewatch | · | 2.4 km | MPC · JPL |
| 536379 | 2015 DX_{69} | — | January 29, 2011 | Mount Lemmon | Mount Lemmon Survey | · | 1.0 km | MPC · JPL |
| 536380 | 2015 DX_{73} | — | March 14, 2010 | Mount Lemmon | Mount Lemmon Survey | EOS | 1.8 km | MPC · JPL |
| 536381 | 2015 DO_{74} | — | January 18, 2009 | Kitt Peak | Spacewatch | · | 2.6 km | MPC · JPL |
| 536382 | 2015 DF_{75} | — | February 8, 2011 | Mount Lemmon | Mount Lemmon Survey | · | 920 m | MPC · JPL |
| 536383 | 2015 DL_{75} | — | September 18, 2006 | Kitt Peak | Spacewatch | THM | 2.3 km | MPC · JPL |
| 536384 | 2015 DV_{76} | — | April 27, 2012 | Mount Lemmon | Mount Lemmon Survey | · | 880 m | MPC · JPL |
| 536385 | 2015 DA_{81} | — | November 29, 2005 | Kitt Peak | Spacewatch | MIS | 1.9 km | MPC · JPL |
| 536386 | 2015 DH_{82} | — | February 8, 2011 | Mount Lemmon | Mount Lemmon Survey | MAS | 780 m | MPC · JPL |
| 536387 | 2015 DM_{82} | — | December 6, 2010 | Kitt Peak | Spacewatch | NYS | 800 m | MPC · JPL |
| 536388 | 2015 DX_{82} | — | October 25, 2005 | Kitt Peak | Spacewatch | · | 1.1 km | MPC · JPL |
| 536389 | 2015 DM_{84} | — | September 4, 1999 | Kitt Peak | Spacewatch | V | 550 m | MPC · JPL |
| 536390 | 2015 DL_{85} | — | October 25, 2013 | Mount Lemmon | Mount Lemmon Survey | · | 1.2 km | MPC · JPL |
| 536391 | 2015 DY_{85} | — | February 10, 1996 | Kitt Peak | Spacewatch | · | 1.6 km | MPC · JPL |
| 536392 | 2015 DV_{86} | — | January 26, 2009 | Mount Lemmon | Mount Lemmon Survey | · | 2.3 km | MPC · JPL |
| 536393 | 2015 DK_{87} | — | August 15, 2002 | Kitt Peak | Spacewatch | · | 1.9 km | MPC · JPL |
| 536394 | 2015 DZ_{89} | — | January 20, 2015 | Haleakala | Pan-STARRS 1 | · | 1.3 km | MPC · JPL |
| 536395 | 2015 DE_{91} | — | March 13, 2010 | Mount Lemmon | Mount Lemmon Survey | · | 2.5 km | MPC · JPL |
| 536396 | 2015 DU_{92} | — | January 29, 2015 | Haleakala | Pan-STARRS 1 | · | 1.5 km | MPC · JPL |
| 536397 | 2015 DB_{95} | — | March 12, 2007 | Kitt Peak | Spacewatch | · | 1.0 km | MPC · JPL |
| 536398 | 2015 DG_{97} | — | November 19, 2009 | Mount Lemmon | Mount Lemmon Survey | · | 1.6 km | MPC · JPL |
| 536399 | 2015 DV_{98} | — | October 23, 2008 | Kitt Peak | Spacewatch | · | 1.6 km | MPC · JPL |
| 536400 | 2015 DF_{99} | — | November 2, 2013 | Mount Lemmon | Mount Lemmon Survey | · | 1.6 km | MPC · JPL |

== 536401–536500 ==
back to top

| Designation | | | Discovery | | | Properties | | Ref |
| Permanent | Provisional | Named after | Date | Site | Discoverer(s) | Category | Diam. | Ref |
|---|---|---|---|---|---|---|---|---|
| 536401 | 2015 DV_{99} | — | February 14, 2010 | Catalina | CSS | · | 2.7 km | MPC · JPL |
| 536402 | 2015 DA_{101} | — | November 3, 2010 | Mount Lemmon | Mount Lemmon Survey | · | 830 m | MPC · JPL |
| 536403 | 2015 DN_{101} | — | January 17, 2004 | Palomar | NEAT | · | 2.3 km | MPC · JPL |
| 536404 | 2015 DO_{101} | — | January 31, 2008 | Catalina | CSS | · | 780 m | MPC · JPL |
| 536405 | 2015 DZ_{101} | — | October 31, 2013 | Kitt Peak | Spacewatch | · | 3.1 km | MPC · JPL |
| 536406 | 2015 DM_{102} | — | April 25, 2010 | WISE | WISE | NAE | 3.3 km | MPC · JPL |
| 536407 | 2015 DL_{104} | — | December 10, 2009 | Mount Lemmon | Mount Lemmon Survey | · | 2.1 km | MPC · JPL |
| 536408 | 2015 DX_{104} | — | April 10, 2005 | Mount Lemmon | Mount Lemmon Survey | · | 3.5 km | MPC · JPL |
| 536409 | 2015 DZ_{104} | — | May 9, 2007 | Kitt Peak | Spacewatch | · | 3.2 km | MPC · JPL |
| 536410 | 2015 DG_{105} | — | September 15, 2004 | Kitt Peak | Spacewatch | · | 2.0 km | MPC · JPL |
| 536411 | 2015 DC_{106} | — | March 4, 2005 | Mount Lemmon | Mount Lemmon Survey | EOS | 1.7 km | MPC · JPL |
| 536412 | 2015 DA_{107} | — | December 31, 2008 | Mount Lemmon | Mount Lemmon Survey | · | 3.0 km | MPC · JPL |
| 536413 | 2015 DF_{107} | — | March 16, 2010 | Mount Lemmon | Mount Lemmon Survey | EOS | 1.7 km | MPC · JPL |
| 536414 | 2015 DS_{107} | — | February 22, 2006 | Anderson Mesa | LONEOS | GEF | 1.5 km | MPC · JPL |
| 536415 | 2015 DE_{109} | — | September 15, 2007 | Kitt Peak | Spacewatch | · | 2.6 km | MPC · JPL |
| 536416 | 2015 DG_{111} | — | November 26, 2005 | Mount Lemmon | Mount Lemmon Survey | JUN | 1.2 km | MPC · JPL |
| 536417 | 2015 DB_{113} | — | October 31, 2005 | Kitt Peak | Spacewatch | · | 1.3 km | MPC · JPL |
| 536418 | 2015 DH_{113} | — | October 25, 2013 | Kitt Peak | Spacewatch | · | 2.4 km | MPC · JPL |
| 536419 | 2015 DP_{113} | — | September 29, 2008 | Kitt Peak | Spacewatch | · | 4.3 km | MPC · JPL |
| 536420 | 2015 DQ_{113} | — | November 25, 2005 | Mount Lemmon | Mount Lemmon Survey | EUN | 1.1 km | MPC · JPL |
| 536421 | 2015 DD_{114} | — | September 27, 2009 | Mount Lemmon | Mount Lemmon Survey | EUN | 980 m | MPC · JPL |
| 536422 | 2015 DH_{114} | — | March 16, 2010 | Mount Lemmon | Mount Lemmon Survey | EOS | 1.7 km | MPC · JPL |
| 536423 | 2015 DJ_{114} | — | April 12, 2004 | Kitt Peak | Spacewatch | · | 1.1 km | MPC · JPL |
| 536424 | 2015 DF_{115} | — | May 8, 2011 | Mount Lemmon | Mount Lemmon Survey | · | 2.3 km | MPC · JPL |
| 536425 | 2015 DN_{115} | — | February 12, 2011 | Mount Lemmon | Mount Lemmon Survey | · | 1.4 km | MPC · JPL |
| 536426 | 2015 DP_{115} | — | April 15, 2012 | Haleakala | Pan-STARRS 1 | V | 500 m | MPC · JPL |
| 536427 | 2015 DG_{116} | — | March 13, 2011 | Mount Lemmon | Mount Lemmon Survey | · | 1.4 km | MPC · JPL |
| 536428 | 2015 DG_{118} | — | January 10, 2011 | Mount Lemmon | Mount Lemmon Survey | · | 800 m | MPC · JPL |
| 536429 | 2015 DX_{118} | — | March 26, 2007 | Kitt Peak | Spacewatch | · | 1.1 km | MPC · JPL |
| 536430 | 2015 DM_{119} | — | September 29, 2008 | Kitt Peak | Spacewatch | HOF | 2.1 km | MPC · JPL |
| 536431 | 2015 DS_{119} | — | January 22, 2006 | Mount Lemmon | Mount Lemmon Survey | · | 1.5 km | MPC · JPL |
| 536432 | 2015 DD_{120} | — | January 21, 2015 | Haleakala | Pan-STARRS 1 | EOS | 1.9 km | MPC · JPL |
| 536433 | 2015 DM_{120} | — | December 5, 2002 | Socorro | LINEAR | V | 880 m | MPC · JPL |
| 536434 | 2015 DT_{120} | — | October 7, 2013 | Mount Lemmon | Mount Lemmon Survey | · | 2.0 km | MPC · JPL |
| 536435 | 2015 DB_{124} | — | March 29, 2011 | Catalina | CSS | · | 900 m | MPC · JPL |
| 536436 | 2015 DH_{124} | — | January 11, 2011 | Kitt Peak | Spacewatch | · | 1.2 km | MPC · JPL |
| 536437 | 2015 DB_{125} | — | October 9, 2007 | Kitt Peak | Spacewatch | · | 3.2 km | MPC · JPL |
| 536438 | 2015 DK_{125} | — | December 25, 2013 | Mount Lemmon | Mount Lemmon Survey | · | 2.5 km | MPC · JPL |
| 536439 | 2015 DV_{125} | — | November 24, 2008 | Mount Lemmon | Mount Lemmon Survey | · | 2.9 km | MPC · JPL |
| 536440 | 2015 DX_{125} | — | January 8, 2006 | Mount Lemmon | Mount Lemmon Survey | EUN | 910 m | MPC · JPL |
| 536441 | 2015 DN_{126} | — | January 19, 2015 | Haleakala | Pan-STARRS 1 | · | 2.0 km | MPC · JPL |
| 536442 | 2015 DV_{127} | — | December 29, 2014 | Haleakala | Pan-STARRS 1 | · | 2.8 km | MPC · JPL |
| 536443 | 2015 DN_{128} | — | March 11, 2011 | Catalina | CSS | · | 1.4 km | MPC · JPL |
| 536444 | 2015 DB_{129} | — | October 10, 2007 | Mount Lemmon | Mount Lemmon Survey | · | 3.3 km | MPC · JPL |
| 536445 | 2015 DA_{131} | — | December 10, 2004 | Socorro | LINEAR | · | 2.6 km | MPC · JPL |
| 536446 | 2015 DL_{132} | — | December 7, 2013 | Haleakala | Pan-STARRS 1 | · | 2.0 km | MPC · JPL |
| 536447 | 2015 DE_{133} | — | January 1, 2014 | Haleakala | Pan-STARRS 1 | · | 3.1 km | MPC · JPL |
| 536448 | 2015 DT_{133} | — | March 19, 2007 | Mount Lemmon | Mount Lemmon Survey | · | 970 m | MPC · JPL |
| 536449 | 2015 DD_{134} | — | April 24, 2011 | Kitt Peak | Spacewatch | · | 1.0 km | MPC · JPL |
| 536450 | 2015 DE_{135} | — | January 1, 2014 | Haleakala | Pan-STARRS 1 | · | 2.9 km | MPC · JPL |
| 536451 | 2015 DF_{135} | — | December 30, 2005 | Socorro | LINEAR | · | 1.5 km | MPC · JPL |
| 536452 | 2015 DL_{135} | — | January 30, 2009 | Catalina | CSS | · | 2.8 km | MPC · JPL |
| 536453 | 2015 DO_{135} | — | December 13, 2013 | Mount Lemmon | Mount Lemmon Survey | · | 3.5 km | MPC · JPL |
| 536454 | 2015 DG_{137} | — | January 15, 2005 | Catalina | CSS | · | 2.6 km | MPC · JPL |
| 536455 | 2015 DP_{137} | — | February 17, 2015 | Haleakala | Pan-STARRS 1 | · | 1.1 km | MPC · JPL |
| 536456 | 2015 DQ_{137} | — | April 26, 2011 | Kitt Peak | Spacewatch | · | 1.2 km | MPC · JPL |
| 536457 | 2015 DS_{138} | — | February 13, 2008 | Catalina | CSS | · | 4.4 km | MPC · JPL |
| 536458 | 2015 DT_{138} | — | October 11, 2007 | Mount Lemmon | Mount Lemmon Survey | · | 3.4 km | MPC · JPL |
| 536459 | 2015 DC_{139} | — | September 21, 2009 | Mount Lemmon | Mount Lemmon Survey | · | 1.3 km | MPC · JPL |
| 536460 | 2015 DN_{141} | — | December 5, 2010 | Mount Lemmon | Mount Lemmon Survey | · | 1.2 km | MPC · JPL |
| 536461 | 2015 DE_{142} | — | October 31, 2010 | Mount Lemmon | Mount Lemmon Survey | · | 730 m | MPC · JPL |
| 536462 | 2015 DN_{142} | — | November 29, 2014 | Haleakala | Pan-STARRS 1 | · | 3.2 km | MPC · JPL |
| 536463 | 2015 DB_{143} | — | March 10, 2007 | Kitt Peak | Spacewatch | · | 840 m | MPC · JPL |
| 536464 | 2015 DG_{143} | — | February 27, 2006 | Kitt Peak | Spacewatch | · | 2.2 km | MPC · JPL |
| 536465 | 2015 DF_{144} | — | February 10, 2007 | Catalina | CSS | · | 1.4 km | MPC · JPL |
| 536466 | 2015 DL_{144} | — | November 3, 2004 | Kitt Peak | Spacewatch | · | 2.4 km | MPC · JPL |
| 536467 | 2015 DE_{145} | — | March 28, 2001 | Kitt Peak | Spacewatch | · | 910 m | MPC · JPL |
| 536468 | 2015 DH_{145} | — | January 30, 2006 | Kitt Peak | Spacewatch | · | 2.2 km | MPC · JPL |
| 536469 | 2015 DQ_{145} | — | December 27, 2005 | Kitt Peak | Spacewatch | · | 2.0 km | MPC · JPL |
| 536470 | 2015 DT_{146} | — | October 31, 2006 | Kitt Peak | Spacewatch | · | 1.0 km | MPC · JPL |
| 536471 | 2015 DK_{147} | — | October 29, 2008 | Kitt Peak | Spacewatch | EOS | 1.6 km | MPC · JPL |
| 536472 | 2015 DQ_{148} | — | November 4, 2005 | Mount Lemmon | Mount Lemmon Survey | · | 960 m | MPC · JPL |
| 536473 | 2015 DT_{148} | — | July 3, 1998 | Kitt Peak | Spacewatch | · | 2.3 km | MPC · JPL |
| 536474 | 2015 DT_{149} | — | March 9, 2011 | Kitt Peak | Spacewatch | · | 1.5 km | MPC · JPL |
| 536475 | 2015 DW_{150} | — | October 16, 2009 | Catalina | CSS | · | 1.7 km | MPC · JPL |
| 536476 | 2015 DE_{151} | — | August 28, 2013 | Catalina | CSS | · | 1.5 km | MPC · JPL |
| 536477 | 2015 DK_{151} | — | March 17, 2004 | Kitt Peak | Spacewatch | (5651) | 5.3 km | MPC · JPL |
| 536478 | 2015 DL_{151} | — | April 6, 2011 | Mount Lemmon | Mount Lemmon Survey | · | 1.9 km | MPC · JPL |
| 536479 | 2015 DO_{151} | — | November 28, 2013 | Mount Lemmon | Mount Lemmon Survey | EOS | 2.0 km | MPC · JPL |
| 536480 | 2015 DM_{153} | — | September 7, 2004 | Kitt Peak | Spacewatch | · | 1.9 km | MPC · JPL |
| 536481 | 2015 DS_{153} | — | March 12, 2011 | Mount Lemmon | Mount Lemmon Survey | · | 1.3 km | MPC · JPL |
| 536482 | 2015 DY_{153} | — | October 11, 2012 | Mount Lemmon | Mount Lemmon Survey | · | 2.6 km | MPC · JPL |
| 536483 | 2015 DS_{154} | — | October 6, 2008 | Mount Lemmon | Mount Lemmon Survey | HOF | 3.7 km | MPC · JPL |
| 536484 | 2015 DJ_{159} | — | June 8, 2007 | Kitt Peak | Spacewatch | MAR | 1.0 km | MPC · JPL |
| 536485 | 2015 DS_{159} | — | January 27, 2015 | Haleakala | Pan-STARRS 1 | WIT | 940 m | MPC · JPL |
| 536486 | 2015 DP_{160} | — | November 11, 2013 | Kitt Peak | Spacewatch | · | 2.3 km | MPC · JPL |
| 536487 | 2015 DH_{161} | — | March 16, 2004 | Kitt Peak | Spacewatch | · | 3.0 km | MPC · JPL |
| 536488 | 2015 DZ_{161} | — | October 8, 2007 | Anderson Mesa | LONEOS | EOS | 2.0 km | MPC · JPL |
| 536489 | 2015 DD_{162} | — | February 9, 2005 | Mount Lemmon | Mount Lemmon Survey | KOR | 1.4 km | MPC · JPL |
| 536490 | 2015 DU_{163} | — | May 16, 2007 | Kitt Peak | Spacewatch | · | 1.1 km | MPC · JPL |
| 536491 | 2015 DK_{165} | — | February 27, 2006 | Mount Lemmon | Mount Lemmon Survey | · | 1.5 km | MPC · JPL |
| 536492 | 2015 DD_{168} | — | June 9, 2010 | WISE | WISE | · | 3.5 km | MPC · JPL |
| 536493 | 2015 DY_{170} | — | November 28, 2014 | Haleakala | Pan-STARRS 1 | · | 1.2 km | MPC · JPL |
| 536494 | 2015 DL_{173} | — | June 22, 2010 | WISE | WISE | · | 3.5 km | MPC · JPL |
| 536495 | 2015 DE_{174} | — | October 5, 2003 | Kitt Peak | Spacewatch | · | 2.1 km | MPC · JPL |
| 536496 | 2015 DL_{175} | — | January 20, 2015 | Haleakala | Pan-STARRS 1 | · | 2.6 km | MPC · JPL |
| 536497 | 2015 DG_{177} | — | August 26, 2013 | Haleakala | Pan-STARRS 1 | · | 1.9 km | MPC · JPL |
| 536498 | 2015 DJ_{179} | — | September 11, 2007 | Kitt Peak | Spacewatch | · | 2.4 km | MPC · JPL |
| 536499 | 2015 DS_{179} | — | November 10, 2009 | Kitt Peak | Spacewatch | · | 1.5 km | MPC · JPL |
| 536500 | 2015 DC_{182} | — | March 9, 2011 | Mount Lemmon | Mount Lemmon Survey | (5) | 870 m | MPC · JPL |

== 536501–536600 ==
back to top

| Designation | | | Discovery | | | Properties | | Ref |
| Permanent | Provisional | Named after | Date | Site | Discoverer(s) | Category | Diam. | Ref |
|---|---|---|---|---|---|---|---|---|
| 536501 | 2015 DD_{188} | — | September 11, 2007 | Mount Lemmon | Mount Lemmon Survey | · | 2.8 km | MPC · JPL |
| 536502 | 2015 DZ_{188} | — | October 10, 2007 | Mount Lemmon | Mount Lemmon Survey | · | 2.4 km | MPC · JPL |
| 536503 | 2015 DA_{192} | — | February 20, 2015 | Haleakala | Pan-STARRS 1 | · | 2.5 km | MPC · JPL |
| 536504 | 2015 DK_{193} | — | October 1, 2005 | Mount Lemmon | Mount Lemmon Survey | · | 2.7 km | MPC · JPL |
| 536505 | 2015 DH_{194} | — | October 15, 2009 | La Sagra | OAM | · | 1.8 km | MPC · JPL |
| 536506 | 2015 DB_{195} | — | September 27, 2009 | Mount Lemmon | Mount Lemmon Survey | JUN | 860 m | MPC · JPL |
| 536507 | 2015 DB_{196} | — | March 31, 2008 | Mount Lemmon | Mount Lemmon Survey | PHO | 930 m | MPC · JPL |
| 536508 | 2015 DF_{196} | — | January 17, 2007 | Catalina | CSS | · | 910 m | MPC · JPL |
| 536509 | 2015 DQ_{197} | — | December 17, 2009 | Mount Lemmon | Mount Lemmon Survey | · | 2.3 km | MPC · JPL |
| 536510 | 2015 DQ_{200} | — | April 13, 2004 | Kitt Peak | Spacewatch | MAS | 640 m | MPC · JPL |
| 536511 | 2015 DM_{201} | — | February 22, 1998 | Kitt Peak | Spacewatch | · | 3.2 km | MPC · JPL |
| 536512 | 2015 DC_{203} | — | January 23, 2006 | Mount Lemmon | Mount Lemmon Survey | · | 1.7 km | MPC · JPL |
| 536513 | 2015 DR_{205} | — | April 18, 2007 | Kitt Peak | Spacewatch | · | 860 m | MPC · JPL |
| 536514 | 2015 DP_{207} | — | April 13, 2004 | Kitt Peak | Spacewatch | PHO | 660 m | MPC · JPL |
| 536515 | 2015 DQ_{207} | — | May 17, 2010 | WISE | WISE | · | 1.7 km | MPC · JPL |
| 536516 | 2015 DC_{208} | — | January 23, 2015 | Haleakala | Pan-STARRS 1 | · | 1.7 km | MPC · JPL |
| 536517 | 2015 DD_{208} | — | January 23, 2015 | Haleakala | Pan-STARRS 1 | · | 1.5 km | MPC · JPL |
| 536518 | 2015 DH_{208} | — | May 1, 2011 | Haleakala | Pan-STARRS 1 | · | 1.3 km | MPC · JPL |
| 536519 | 2015 DP_{208} | — | November 9, 2013 | Haleakala | Pan-STARRS 1 | · | 1.2 km | MPC · JPL |
| 536520 | 2015 DD_{210} | — | December 11, 2009 | La Sagra | OAM | · | 1.6 km | MPC · JPL |
| 536521 | 2015 DO_{210} | — | January 28, 2015 | Haleakala | Pan-STARRS 1 | · | 3.3 km | MPC · JPL |
| 536522 | 2015 DQ_{210} | — | February 23, 2015 | Haleakala | Pan-STARRS 1 | · | 1.8 km | MPC · JPL |
| 536523 | 2015 DY_{211} | — | September 4, 2007 | Catalina | CSS | · | 1.4 km | MPC · JPL |
| 536524 | 2015 DC_{212} | — | May 9, 2007 | Kitt Peak | Spacewatch | · | 910 m | MPC · JPL |
| 536525 | 2015 DK_{212} | — | October 17, 2012 | Mount Lemmon | Mount Lemmon Survey | · | 3.6 km | MPC · JPL |
| 536526 | 2015 DY_{213} | — | October 2, 1999 | Kitt Peak | Spacewatch | · | 1.9 km | MPC · JPL |
| 536527 | 2015 DU_{214} | — | September 4, 2008 | Kitt Peak | Spacewatch | MAR | 1.1 km | MPC · JPL |
| 536528 | 2015 DA_{215} | — | January 14, 2011 | Kitt Peak | Spacewatch | NYS | 1.1 km | MPC · JPL |
| 536529 | 2015 DC_{215} | — | February 26, 2010 | WISE | WISE | ADE | 1.8 km | MPC · JPL |
| 536530 | 2015 DH_{215} | — | February 18, 2015 | Kitt Peak | Spacewatch | · | 2.5 km | MPC · JPL |
| 536531 | 2015 DV_{215} | — | February 27, 2015 | Catalina | CSS | APO · PHA | 290 m | MPC · JPL |
| 536532 | 2015 DK_{216} | — | September 7, 2004 | Kitt Peak | Spacewatch | · | 1.3 km | MPC · JPL |
| 536533 | 2015 DN_{216} | — | June 25, 2010 | WISE | WISE | EOS | 1.7 km | MPC · JPL |
| 536534 | 2015 DU_{216} | — | February 27, 2006 | Mount Lemmon | Mount Lemmon Survey | · | 1.6 km | MPC · JPL |
| 536535 | 2015 DQ_{217} | — | October 10, 2008 | Mount Lemmon | Mount Lemmon Survey | · | 1.9 km | MPC · JPL |
| 536536 | 2015 DV_{217} | — | March 17, 2010 | WISE | WISE | · | 1.5 km | MPC · JPL |
| 536537 | 2015 DO_{218} | — | May 4, 2010 | WISE | WISE | · | 2.1 km | MPC · JPL |
| 536538 | 2015 DU_{218} | — | January 19, 2010 | WISE | WISE | · | 3.4 km | MPC · JPL |
| 536539 | 2015 DG_{219} | — | August 26, 2013 | Haleakala | Pan-STARRS 1 | H | 480 m | MPC · JPL |
| 536540 | 2015 DX_{219} | — | November 16, 2001 | Kitt Peak | Spacewatch | VER | 3.1 km | MPC · JPL |
| 536541 | 2015 DZ_{219} | — | October 26, 2009 | Mount Lemmon | Mount Lemmon Survey | RAF | 850 m | MPC · JPL |
| 536542 | 2015 DF_{221} | — | April 11, 2005 | Mount Lemmon | Mount Lemmon Survey | · | 2.1 km | MPC · JPL |
| 536543 | 2015 DR_{221} | — | October 4, 2012 | Haleakala | Pan-STARRS 1 | · | 1.6 km | MPC · JPL |
| 536544 | 2015 DS_{221} | — | March 10, 2005 | Mount Lemmon | Mount Lemmon Survey | · | 1.9 km | MPC · JPL |
| 536545 | 2015 DF_{222} | — | September 4, 2008 | Kitt Peak | Spacewatch | DOR | 2.1 km | MPC · JPL |
| 536546 | 2015 DS_{223} | — | October 6, 2007 | Kitt Peak | Spacewatch | · | 2.7 km | MPC · JPL |
| 536547 | 2015 DH_{224} | — | February 16, 2010 | Mount Lemmon | Mount Lemmon Survey | · | 2.6 km | MPC · JPL |
| 536548 | 2015 DK_{227} | — | March 16, 2009 | Catalina | CSS | · | 3.5 km | MPC · JPL |
| 536549 | 2015 DN_{228} | — | June 22, 2007 | Kitt Peak | Spacewatch | · | 1.0 km | MPC · JPL |
| 536550 | 2015 DV_{228} | — | September 24, 2012 | Mount Lemmon | Mount Lemmon Survey | · | 1.5 km | MPC · JPL |
| 536551 | 2015 DW_{228} | — | February 15, 2015 | Haleakala | Pan-STARRS 1 | · | 1.6 km | MPC · JPL |
| 536552 | 2015 DZ_{228} | — | April 11, 2005 | Mount Lemmon | Mount Lemmon Survey | · | 1.8 km | MPC · JPL |
| 536553 | 2015 DB_{229} | — | February 24, 2015 | Haleakala | Pan-STARRS 1 | · | 1.4 km | MPC · JPL |
| 536554 | 2015 DC_{229} | — | August 9, 2007 | Kitt Peak | Spacewatch | · | 1.6 km | MPC · JPL |
| 536555 | 2015 DD_{229} | — | December 7, 2013 | Haleakala | Pan-STARRS 1 | · | 1.8 km | MPC · JPL |
| 536556 | 2015 DF_{229} | — | September 18, 1995 | Kitt Peak | Spacewatch | · | 1.8 km | MPC · JPL |
| 536557 | 2015 DG_{229} | — | September 12, 2007 | Mount Lemmon | Mount Lemmon Survey | KOR | 1.1 km | MPC · JPL |
| 536558 | 2015 DH_{229} | — | February 27, 2015 | Haleakala | Pan-STARRS 1 | KOR | 1.1 km | MPC · JPL |
| 536559 | 2015 DU_{229} | — | October 1, 2013 | Kitt Peak | Spacewatch | · | 1.3 km | MPC · JPL |
| 536560 | 2015 DX_{229} | — | December 7, 2008 | Mount Lemmon | Mount Lemmon Survey | EOS | 2.1 km | MPC · JPL |
| 536561 | 2015 DB_{230} | — | March 26, 2011 | Kitt Peak | Spacewatch | (7744) | 1.1 km | MPC · JPL |
| 536562 | 2015 DP_{230} | — | January 29, 2011 | Mount Lemmon | Mount Lemmon Survey | · | 810 m | MPC · JPL |
| 536563 | 2015 DR_{230} | — | February 10, 2007 | Mount Lemmon | Mount Lemmon Survey | · | 950 m | MPC · JPL |
| 536564 | 2015 DS_{230} | — | February 23, 2007 | Mount Lemmon | Mount Lemmon Survey | · | 820 m | MPC · JPL |
| 536565 | 2015 DX_{230} | — | November 12, 2007 | Mount Lemmon | Mount Lemmon Survey | EOS | 1.8 km | MPC · JPL |
| 536566 | 2015 DB_{231} | — | November 9, 2013 | Kitt Peak | Spacewatch | · | 1.4 km | MPC · JPL |
| 536567 | 2015 DC_{231} | — | September 19, 2012 | Mount Lemmon | Mount Lemmon Survey | EOS | 1.5 km | MPC · JPL |
| 536568 | 2015 DF_{231} | — | September 14, 2007 | Mount Lemmon | Mount Lemmon Survey | · | 2.2 km | MPC · JPL |
| 536569 | 2015 DH_{231} | — | February 16, 2015 | Haleakala | Pan-STARRS 1 | · | 1.8 km | MPC · JPL |
| 536570 | 2015 DL_{231} | — | November 14, 2007 | Mount Lemmon | Mount Lemmon Survey | · | 3.1 km | MPC · JPL |
| 536571 | 2015 DM_{231} | — | March 26, 2007 | Kitt Peak | Spacewatch | · | 830 m | MPC · JPL |
| 536572 | 2015 DO_{231} | — | September 13, 2007 | Mount Lemmon | Mount Lemmon Survey | · | 2.2 km | MPC · JPL |
| 536573 | 2015 DP_{231} | — | November 8, 2007 | Kitt Peak | Spacewatch | · | 3.2 km | MPC · JPL |
| 536574 | 2015 DQ_{231} | — | February 1, 2010 | WISE | WISE | · | 4.5 km | MPC · JPL |
| 536575 | 2015 DR_{231} | — | February 24, 2015 | Haleakala | Pan-STARRS 1 | · | 2.4 km | MPC · JPL |
| 536576 | 2015 DT_{231} | — | September 22, 1995 | Kitt Peak | Spacewatch | · | 2.7 km | MPC · JPL |
| 536577 | 2015 DV_{231} | — | November 3, 2007 | Mount Lemmon | Mount Lemmon Survey | · | 2.6 km | MPC · JPL |
| 536578 | 2015 DW_{231} | — | October 28, 2001 | Palomar | NEAT | · | 2.8 km | MPC · JPL |
| 536579 | 2015 DY_{231} | — | January 6, 2010 | Kitt Peak | Spacewatch | · | 2.3 km | MPC · JPL |
| 536580 | 2015 DZ_{231} | — | November 9, 2009 | Kitt Peak | Spacewatch | · | 1.4 km | MPC · JPL |
| 536581 | 2015 DC_{232} | — | April 28, 2004 | Kitt Peak | Spacewatch | · | 5.5 km | MPC · JPL |
| 536582 | 2015 DX_{232} | — | October 18, 2009 | Mount Lemmon | Mount Lemmon Survey | · | 1.1 km | MPC · JPL |
| 536583 | 2015 DF_{233} | — | February 18, 2015 | Kitt Peak | Spacewatch | · | 2.4 km | MPC · JPL |
| 536584 | 2015 DG_{233} | — | January 31, 2009 | Mount Lemmon | Mount Lemmon Survey | · | 2.7 km | MPC · JPL |
| 536585 | 2015 DH_{233} | — | September 22, 2012 | Kitt Peak | Spacewatch | · | 2.7 km | MPC · JPL |
| 536586 | 2015 DR_{233} | — | February 28, 2009 | Mount Lemmon | Mount Lemmon Survey | · | 1.7 km | MPC · JPL |
| 536587 | 2015 DX_{233} | — | February 18, 2015 | Mount Lemmon | Mount Lemmon Survey | · | 1.6 km | MPC · JPL |
| 536588 | 2015 DY_{233} | — | February 19, 2015 | Haleakala | Pan-STARRS 1 | · | 1.1 km | MPC · JPL |
| 536589 | 2015 DZ_{233} | — | November 14, 2007 | Kitt Peak | Spacewatch | · | 3.3 km | MPC · JPL |
| 536590 | 2015 DA_{234} | — | November 16, 2009 | Mount Lemmon | Mount Lemmon Survey | · | 2.1 km | MPC · JPL |
| 536591 | 2015 DD_{234} | — | November 1, 2008 | Mount Lemmon | Mount Lemmon Survey | · | 1.6 km | MPC · JPL |
| 536592 | 2015 DE_{234} | — | March 29, 2011 | Kitt Peak | Spacewatch | RAF | 690 m | MPC · JPL |
| 536593 | 2015 DF_{234} | — | October 21, 2008 | Kitt Peak | Spacewatch | · | 1.4 km | MPC · JPL |
| 536594 | 2015 DG_{234} | — | March 2, 2011 | Kitt Peak | Spacewatch | · | 1.3 km | MPC · JPL |
| 536595 | 2015 DH_{234} | — | May 3, 2006 | Kitt Peak | Spacewatch | · | 1.7 km | MPC · JPL |
| 536596 | 2015 DJ_{234} | — | August 17, 2012 | Haleakala | Pan-STARRS 1 | · | 1.5 km | MPC · JPL |
| 536597 | 2015 DK_{234} | — | September 6, 2008 | Mount Lemmon | Mount Lemmon Survey | · | 1.5 km | MPC · JPL |
| 536598 | 2015 DL_{234} | — | November 20, 2008 | Kitt Peak | Spacewatch | KOR | 1.1 km | MPC · JPL |
| 536599 | 2015 DM_{234} | — | March 11, 2011 | Kitt Peak | Spacewatch | · | 940 m | MPC · JPL |
| 536600 | 2015 DN_{234} | — | October 8, 2008 | Mount Lemmon | Mount Lemmon Survey | · | 1.8 km | MPC · JPL |

== 536601–536700 ==
back to top

| Designation | | | Discovery | | | Properties | | Ref |
| Permanent | Provisional | Named after | Date | Site | Discoverer(s) | Category | Diam. | Ref |
|---|---|---|---|---|---|---|---|---|
| 536601 | 2015 DO_{234} | — | September 25, 2008 | Kitt Peak | Spacewatch | · | 1.6 km | MPC · JPL |
| 536602 | 2015 DR_{234} | — | May 22, 2011 | Mount Lemmon | Mount Lemmon Survey | AGN | 1.0 km | MPC · JPL |
| 536603 | 2015 DT_{234} | — | September 26, 2008 | Kitt Peak | Spacewatch | · | 1.4 km | MPC · JPL |
| 536604 | 2015 DW_{234} | — | November 30, 2003 | Kitt Peak | Spacewatch | KOR | 1.2 km | MPC · JPL |
| 536605 | 2015 DX_{234} | — | January 13, 2008 | Kitt Peak | Spacewatch | · | 3.5 km | MPC · JPL |
| 536606 | 2015 DY_{234} | — | April 29, 2011 | Mount Lemmon | Mount Lemmon Survey | · | 1.4 km | MPC · JPL |
| 536607 | 2015 DA_{235} | — | October 26, 2008 | Mount Lemmon | Mount Lemmon Survey | · | 2.2 km | MPC · JPL |
| 536608 | 2015 DB_{235} | — | September 11, 2007 | Mount Lemmon | Mount Lemmon Survey | AGN | 1.2 km | MPC · JPL |
| 536609 | 2015 DD_{235} | — | August 26, 2012 | Haleakala | Pan-STARRS 1 | · | 1.7 km | MPC · JPL |
| 536610 | 2015 DO_{235} | — | November 27, 2013 | Haleakala | Pan-STARRS 1 | · | 1.8 km | MPC · JPL |
| 536611 | 2015 DW_{235} | — | February 16, 2015 | Haleakala | Pan-STARRS 1 | · | 860 m | MPC · JPL |
| 536612 | 2015 DY_{235} | — | April 13, 2004 | Kitt Peak | Spacewatch | · | 1.3 km | MPC · JPL |
| 536613 | 2015 DB_{236} | — | June 25, 2011 | Kitt Peak | Spacewatch | · | 2.8 km | MPC · JPL |
| 536614 | 2015 DC_{236} | — | January 27, 2015 | Haleakala | Pan-STARRS 1 | · | 1.0 km | MPC · JPL |
| 536615 | 2015 DE_{236} | — | November 11, 2013 | Kitt Peak | Spacewatch | · | 1.7 km | MPC · JPL |
| 536616 | 2015 DK_{236} | — | February 8, 2011 | Mount Lemmon | Mount Lemmon Survey | · | 920 m | MPC · JPL |
| 536617 | 2015 DQ_{236} | — | September 2, 2007 | Mount Lemmon | Mount Lemmon Survey | EOS | 1.6 km | MPC · JPL |
| 536618 | 2015 DR_{236} | — | February 16, 2015 | Haleakala | Pan-STARRS 1 | · | 1.3 km | MPC · JPL |
| 536619 | 2015 DU_{236} | — | December 30, 2005 | Kitt Peak | Spacewatch | · | 1.1 km | MPC · JPL |
| 536620 | 2015 DY_{236} | — | February 13, 2011 | Mount Lemmon | Mount Lemmon Survey | · | 860 m | MPC · JPL |
| 536621 | 2015 DH_{237} | — | November 1, 2013 | Mount Lemmon | Mount Lemmon Survey | EUN | 1.1 km | MPC · JPL |
| 536622 | 2015 DN_{237} | — | February 16, 2015 | Haleakala | Pan-STARRS 1 | · | 1.4 km | MPC · JPL |
| 536623 | 2015 DO_{237} | — | January 30, 2006 | Kitt Peak | Spacewatch | · | 1.6 km | MPC · JPL |
| 536624 | 2015 DR_{237} | — | September 6, 2008 | Mount Lemmon | Mount Lemmon Survey | · | 1.1 km | MPC · JPL |
| 536625 | 2015 DF_{238} | — | August 26, 2012 | Haleakala | Pan-STARRS 1 | EUN | 1.1 km | MPC · JPL |
| 536626 | 2015 DG_{238} | — | October 21, 2012 | Haleakala | Pan-STARRS 1 | CYB | 2.8 km | MPC · JPL |
| 536627 | 2015 DH_{238} | — | February 16, 2015 | Haleakala | Pan-STARRS 1 | · | 2.4 km | MPC · JPL |
| 536628 | 2015 DM_{238} | — | January 9, 2006 | Kitt Peak | Spacewatch | MIS | 2.2 km | MPC · JPL |
| 536629 | 2015 DF_{239} | — | February 16, 2015 | Haleakala | Pan-STARRS 1 | · | 1.3 km | MPC · JPL |
| 536630 | 2015 DZ_{239} | — | January 20, 2015 | Haleakala | Pan-STARRS 1 | KOR | 970 m | MPC · JPL |
| 536631 | 2015 DD_{240} | — | November 2, 2007 | Kitt Peak | Spacewatch | · | 2.3 km | MPC · JPL |
| 536632 | 2015 DE_{240} | — | February 17, 2015 | Haleakala | Pan-STARRS 1 | PHO | 960 m | MPC · JPL |
| 536633 | 2015 DJ_{240} | — | January 21, 2015 | Haleakala | Pan-STARRS 1 | · | 1.9 km | MPC · JPL |
| 536634 | 2015 DQ_{240} | — | January 27, 2015 | Haleakala | Pan-STARRS 1 | · | 1.6 km | MPC · JPL |
| 536635 | 2015 DS_{240} | — | February 17, 2015 | Haleakala | Pan-STARRS 1 | · | 2.5 km | MPC · JPL |
| 536636 | 2015 DU_{240} | — | January 21, 2015 | Haleakala | Pan-STARRS 1 | MAR | 800 m | MPC · JPL |
| 536637 | 2015 DW_{240} | — | November 10, 2013 | Mount Lemmon | Mount Lemmon Survey | EOS | 1.7 km | MPC · JPL |
| 536638 | 2015 DZ_{240} | — | January 20, 2015 | Haleakala | Pan-STARRS 1 | MAR | 980 m | MPC · JPL |
| 536639 | 2015 DM_{241} | — | February 18, 2015 | Haleakala | Pan-STARRS 1 | · | 1.5 km | MPC · JPL |
| 536640 | 2015 DO_{241} | — | April 13, 2005 | Catalina | CSS | · | 2.5 km | MPC · JPL |
| 536641 | 2015 DS_{241} | — | February 18, 2015 | Haleakala | Pan-STARRS 1 | · | 1.9 km | MPC · JPL |
| 536642 | 2015 DU_{241} | — | February 18, 2015 | Haleakala | Pan-STARRS 1 | · | 2.1 km | MPC · JPL |
| 536643 | 2015 DF_{242} | — | March 13, 2011 | Mount Lemmon | Mount Lemmon Survey | · | 1.1 km | MPC · JPL |
| 536644 | 2015 DM_{242} | — | April 28, 2011 | Kitt Peak | Spacewatch | · | 1.2 km | MPC · JPL |
| 536645 | 2015 DB_{243} | — | January 21, 2015 | Haleakala | Pan-STARRS 1 | · | 810 m | MPC · JPL |
| 536646 | 2015 DH_{243} | — | January 3, 2009 | Kitt Peak | Spacewatch | · | 2.4 km | MPC · JPL |
| 536647 | 2015 DM_{243} | — | October 18, 2012 | Haleakala | Pan-STARRS 1 | ELF | 2.6 km | MPC · JPL |
| 536648 | 2015 DC_{244} | — | January 24, 2015 | Haleakala | Pan-STARRS 1 | BRG | 1.3 km | MPC · JPL |
| 536649 | 2015 DE_{244} | — | January 16, 2015 | Haleakala | Pan-STARRS 1 | · | 1.8 km | MPC · JPL |
| 536650 | 2015 DJ_{244} | — | January 20, 2015 | Haleakala | Pan-STARRS 1 | · | 1.0 km | MPC · JPL |
| 536651 | 2015 DK_{244} | — | February 23, 2015 | Haleakala | Pan-STARRS 1 | · | 2.1 km | MPC · JPL |
| 536652 | 2015 DN_{244} | — | January 28, 2015 | Haleakala | Pan-STARRS 1 | · | 2.8 km | MPC · JPL |
| 536653 | 2015 DQ_{244} | — | January 28, 2015 | Haleakala | Pan-STARRS 1 | EUN | 1 km | MPC · JPL |
| 536654 | 2015 DW_{244} | — | January 26, 2006 | Kitt Peak | Spacewatch | EUN | 860 m | MPC · JPL |
| 536655 | 2015 DK_{245} | — | February 23, 2015 | Haleakala | Pan-STARRS 1 | · | 2.1 km | MPC · JPL |
| 536656 | 2015 DM_{245} | — | November 27, 2013 | Haleakala | Pan-STARRS 1 | EOS | 1.3 km | MPC · JPL |
| 536657 | 2015 DV_{245} | — | September 6, 2013 | Kitt Peak | Spacewatch | · | 1.2 km | MPC · JPL |
| 536658 | 2015 DX_{245} | — | August 26, 2012 | Haleakala | Pan-STARRS 1 | AGN | 1.1 km | MPC · JPL |
| 536659 | 2015 DB_{246} | — | February 10, 2011 | Mount Lemmon | Mount Lemmon Survey | · | 990 m | MPC · JPL |
| 536660 | 2015 DJ_{246} | — | January 20, 2009 | Kitt Peak | Spacewatch | · | 1.4 km | MPC · JPL |
| 536661 | 2015 DS_{246} | — | May 29, 2011 | Mount Lemmon | Mount Lemmon Survey | · | 1.4 km | MPC · JPL |
| 536662 | 2015 DT_{246} | — | January 23, 2015 | Haleakala | Pan-STARRS 1 | · | 1.2 km | MPC · JPL |
| 536663 | 2015 DW_{246} | — | December 2, 2005 | Kitt Peak | Spacewatch | (5) | 970 m | MPC · JPL |
| 536664 | 2015 DX_{246} | — | February 25, 2015 | Haleakala | Pan-STARRS 1 | · | 3.0 km | MPC · JPL |
| 536665 | 2015 DB_{247} | — | January 21, 2015 | Haleakala | Pan-STARRS 1 | · | 1.7 km | MPC · JPL |
| 536666 | 2015 DD_{247} | — | October 15, 2012 | Haleakala | Pan-STARRS 1 | · | 3.2 km | MPC · JPL |
| 536667 | 2015 DF_{247} | — | January 20, 2015 | Haleakala | Pan-STARRS 1 | · | 1.1 km | MPC · JPL |
| 536668 | 2015 DJ_{247} | — | February 27, 2015 | Haleakala | Pan-STARRS 1 | · | 1.5 km | MPC · JPL |
| 536669 | 2015 DK_{247} | — | November 6, 2013 | Haleakala | Pan-STARRS 1 | · | 1.3 km | MPC · JPL |
| 536670 | 2015 DP_{247} | — | November 9, 2013 | Haleakala | Pan-STARRS 1 | · | 920 m | MPC · JPL |
| 536671 | 2015 DE_{248} | — | April 19, 2007 | Kitt Peak | Spacewatch | · | 1.2 km | MPC · JPL |
| 536672 | 2015 DF_{248} | — | February 27, 2015 | Haleakala | Pan-STARRS 1 | · | 920 m | MPC · JPL |
| 536673 | 2015 DC_{250} | — | February 16, 2015 | Haleakala | Pan-STARRS 1 | NYS | 1.0 km | MPC · JPL |
| 536674 | 2015 DE_{250} | — | February 17, 2015 | Haleakala | Pan-STARRS 1 | · | 1.8 km | MPC · JPL |
| 536675 | 2015 DJ_{250} | — | February 19, 2009 | Kitt Peak | Spacewatch | · | 3.1 km | MPC · JPL |
| 536676 | 2015 DK_{250} | — | September 25, 2013 | Mount Lemmon | Mount Lemmon Survey | · | 710 m | MPC · JPL |
| 536677 | 2015 DM_{250} | — | February 17, 2015 | Haleakala | Pan-STARRS 1 | · | 1.1 km | MPC · JPL |
| 536678 | 2015 DS_{250} | — | February 16, 2015 | Haleakala | Pan-STARRS 1 | · | 2.0 km | MPC · JPL |
| 536679 | 2015 DV_{250} | — | October 10, 2007 | Mount Lemmon | Mount Lemmon Survey | · | 2.6 km | MPC · JPL |
| 536680 | 2015 DW_{250} | — | February 20, 2015 | Haleakala | Pan-STARRS 1 | · | 1.3 km | MPC · JPL |
| 536681 | 2015 DY_{250} | — | February 23, 2015 | Haleakala | Pan-STARRS 1 | · | 1.7 km | MPC · JPL |
| 536682 | 2015 EB_{1} | — | August 26, 2012 | Haleakala | Pan-STARRS 1 | · | 2.7 km | MPC · JPL |
| 536683 | 2015 EW_{1} | — | April 28, 2010 | WISE | WISE | · | 2.4 km | MPC · JPL |
| 536684 | 2015 EU_{2} | — | April 13, 2011 | Mount Lemmon | Mount Lemmon Survey | JUN | 810 m | MPC · JPL |
| 536685 | 2015 EA_{3} | — | October 1, 2013 | Mount Lemmon | Mount Lemmon Survey | · | 860 m | MPC · JPL |
| 536686 | 2015 EE_{3} | — | December 28, 2005 | Mount Lemmon | Mount Lemmon Survey | · | 1.1 km | MPC · JPL |
| 536687 | 2015 EG_{3} | — | November 6, 2013 | Haleakala | Pan-STARRS 1 | EOS | 1.9 km | MPC · JPL |
| 536688 | 2015 EN_{3} | — | November 15, 2006 | Mount Lemmon | Mount Lemmon Survey | · | 770 m | MPC · JPL |
| 536689 | 2015 ED_{4} | — | January 22, 2006 | Catalina | CSS | · | 1.5 km | MPC · JPL |
| 536690 | 2015 EE_{4} | — | April 2, 1994 | Kitt Peak | Spacewatch | · | 1.3 km | MPC · JPL |
| 536691 | 2015 EG_{5} | — | January 29, 2015 | Haleakala | Pan-STARRS 1 | · | 2.1 km | MPC · JPL |
| 536692 | 2015 EB_{6} | — | August 22, 2012 | Haleakala | Pan-STARRS 1 | · | 2.7 km | MPC · JPL |
| 536693 | 2015 EK_{8} | — | August 15, 2013 | Haleakala | Pan-STARRS 1 | · | 930 m | MPC · JPL |
| 536694 | 2015 EU_{10} | — | November 4, 2005 | Mount Lemmon | Mount Lemmon Survey | · | 840 m | MPC · JPL |
| 536695 | 2015 ED_{12} | — | November 2, 2008 | Kitt Peak | Spacewatch | · | 2.3 km | MPC · JPL |
| 536696 | 2015 EG_{12} | — | April 10, 2005 | Mount Lemmon | Mount Lemmon Survey | · | 2.4 km | MPC · JPL |
| 536697 | 2015 EQ_{13} | — | July 14, 2010 | WISE | WISE | · | 2.9 km | MPC · JPL |
| 536698 | 2015 EH_{15} | — | November 30, 2005 | Kitt Peak | Spacewatch | · | 1.1 km | MPC · JPL |
| 536699 | 2015 ET_{16} | — | November 9, 2013 | Haleakala | Pan-STARRS 1 | · | 1.1 km | MPC · JPL |
| 536700 | 2015 EM_{17} | — | October 23, 2013 | Mount Lemmon | Mount Lemmon Survey | · | 1.1 km | MPC · JPL |

== 536701–536800 ==
back to top

| Designation | | | Discovery | | | Properties | | Ref |
| Permanent | Provisional | Named after | Date | Site | Discoverer(s) | Category | Diam. | Ref |
|---|---|---|---|---|---|---|---|---|
| 536701 | 2015 EY_{17} | — | May 29, 2012 | Mount Lemmon | Mount Lemmon Survey | · | 1.0 km | MPC · JPL |
| 536702 | 2015 EA_{18} | — | March 20, 2010 | Kitt Peak | Spacewatch | · | 2.6 km | MPC · JPL |
| 536703 | 2015 EG_{19} | — | March 27, 2000 | Kitt Peak | Spacewatch | · | 810 m | MPC · JPL |
| 536704 | 2015 EQ_{20} | — | September 6, 2008 | Mount Lemmon | Mount Lemmon Survey | · | 1.3 km | MPC · JPL |
| 536705 | 2015 EL_{22} | — | March 20, 2010 | Mount Lemmon | Mount Lemmon Survey | EUP | 3.8 km | MPC · JPL |
| 536706 | 2015 EM_{22} | — | November 8, 2009 | Mount Lemmon | Mount Lemmon Survey | MIS | 2.3 km | MPC · JPL |
| 536707 | 2015 EO_{24} | — | February 7, 2008 | Kitt Peak | Spacewatch | NYS | 770 m | MPC · JPL |
| 536708 | 2015 EA_{29} | — | January 21, 2015 | Haleakala | Pan-STARRS 1 | · | 1.2 km | MPC · JPL |
| 536709 | 2015 EY_{30} | — | February 18, 2010 | Mount Lemmon | Mount Lemmon Survey | EOS | 1.3 km | MPC · JPL |
| 536710 | 2015 ED_{32} | — | October 27, 2005 | Kitt Peak | Spacewatch | · | 1.3 km | MPC · JPL |
| 536711 | 2015 EZ_{32} | — | August 5, 2003 | Kitt Peak | Spacewatch | · | 2.2 km | MPC · JPL |
| 536712 | 2015 ES_{33} | — | October 26, 1994 | Kitt Peak | Spacewatch | · | 1.1 km | MPC · JPL |
| 536713 | 2015 EL_{37} | — | September 15, 2013 | Haleakala | Pan-STARRS 1 | DOR | 2.0 km | MPC · JPL |
| 536714 | 2015 EH_{41} | — | February 28, 2008 | Kitt Peak | Spacewatch | · | 880 m | MPC · JPL |
| 536715 | 2015 EC_{43} | — | December 17, 2009 | Kitt Peak | Spacewatch | EOS | 2.9 km | MPC · JPL |
| 536716 | 2015 EP_{46} | — | February 16, 2015 | Haleakala | Pan-STARRS 1 | · | 1.2 km | MPC · JPL |
| 536717 | 2015 EU_{49} | — | September 9, 2007 | Kitt Peak | Spacewatch | EOS | 1.8 km | MPC · JPL |
| 536718 | 2015 EU_{52} | — | November 20, 2006 | Kitt Peak | Spacewatch | V | 600 m | MPC · JPL |
| 536719 | 2015 EW_{57} | — | February 27, 2010 | WISE | WISE | TIR | 2.5 km | MPC · JPL |
| 536720 | 2015 EH_{58} | — | April 25, 2004 | Kitt Peak | Spacewatch | · | 5.3 km | MPC · JPL |
| 536721 | 2015 EM_{62} | — | January 1, 2009 | Kitt Peak | Spacewatch | HYG | 3.0 km | MPC · JPL |
| 536722 | 2015 EO_{62} | — | October 11, 2005 | Kitt Peak | Spacewatch | · | 1.0 km | MPC · JPL |
| 536723 | 2015 EQ_{63} | — | January 16, 2004 | Palomar | NEAT | · | 2.0 km | MPC · JPL |
| 536724 | 2015 EH_{64} | — | September 12, 2013 | Mount Lemmon | Mount Lemmon Survey | · | 1.9 km | MPC · JPL |
| 536725 | 2015 EM_{64} | — | October 7, 2008 | Mount Lemmon | Mount Lemmon Survey | · | 2.0 km | MPC · JPL |
| 536726 | 2015 EN_{64} | — | October 8, 2001 | Palomar | NEAT | · | 1.5 km | MPC · JPL |
| 536727 | 2015 EA_{65} | — | March 16, 2004 | Kitt Peak | Spacewatch | · | 2.8 km | MPC · JPL |
| 536728 | 2015 EV_{65} | — | April 22, 2004 | Kitt Peak | Spacewatch | · | 760 m | MPC · JPL |
| 536729 | 2015 EE_{68} | — | January 4, 2006 | Kitt Peak | Spacewatch | · | 1.4 km | MPC · JPL |
| 536730 | 2015 EJ_{68} | — | January 16, 2011 | Mount Lemmon | Mount Lemmon Survey | MAS | 630 m | MPC · JPL |
| 536731 | 2015 EW_{68} | — | March 6, 2011 | Mount Lemmon | Mount Lemmon Survey | BRG | 940 m | MPC · JPL |
| 536732 | 2015 EM_{69} | — | October 3, 2013 | Haleakala | Pan-STARRS 1 | · | 1.3 km | MPC · JPL |
| 536733 | 2015 EW_{69} | — | February 17, 2015 | Haleakala | Pan-STARRS 1 | · | 1.5 km | MPC · JPL |
| 536734 | 2015 EF_{75} | — | April 14, 2008 | Kitt Peak | Spacewatch | · | 980 m | MPC · JPL |
| 536735 | 2015 EH_{75} | — | August 10, 2007 | Kitt Peak | Spacewatch | EOS | 1.4 km | MPC · JPL |
| 536736 | 2015 FT_{1} | — | October 27, 2009 | Kitt Peak | Spacewatch | · | 1.4 km | MPC · JPL |
| 536737 | 2015 FC_{2} | — | September 16, 2009 | Kitt Peak | Spacewatch | MAR | 950 m | MPC · JPL |
| 536738 | 2015 FG_{2} | — | November 19, 2008 | Kitt Peak | Spacewatch | · | 2.8 km | MPC · JPL |
| 536739 | 2015 FK_{2} | — | April 4, 2011 | Mount Lemmon | Mount Lemmon Survey | · | 1.4 km | MPC · JPL |
| 536740 | 2015 FL_{3} | — | March 5, 2008 | Kitt Peak | Spacewatch | PHO | 740 m | MPC · JPL |
| 536741 | 2015 FD_{4} | — | November 20, 2001 | Socorro | LINEAR | · | 1.1 km | MPC · JPL |
| 536742 | 2015 FP_{4} | — | April 16, 2007 | Mount Lemmon | Mount Lemmon Survey | · | 2.1 km | MPC · JPL |
| 536743 | 2015 FY_{5} | — | October 22, 2009 | Mount Lemmon | Mount Lemmon Survey | · | 1.5 km | MPC · JPL |
| 536744 | 2015 FM_{6} | — | September 9, 2007 | Kitt Peak | Spacewatch | EOS | 1.5 km | MPC · JPL |
| 536745 | 2015 FX_{6} | — | September 14, 2006 | Kitt Peak | Spacewatch | · | 1.0 km | MPC · JPL |
| 536746 | 2015 FU_{11} | — | October 4, 2004 | Palomar | NEAT | · | 1.5 km | MPC · JPL |
| 536747 | 2015 FG_{14} | — | December 19, 2003 | Kitt Peak | Spacewatch | · | 1.6 km | MPC · JPL |
| 536748 | 2015 FR_{15} | — | March 16, 2015 | Haleakala | Pan-STARRS 1 | PHO | 830 m | MPC · JPL |
| 536749 | 2015 FY_{15} | — | December 31, 2008 | Catalina | CSS | INA | 3.0 km | MPC · JPL |
| 536750 | 2015 FP_{18} | — | November 1, 2007 | Kitt Peak | Spacewatch | · | 3.0 km | MPC · JPL |
| 536751 | 2015 FR_{18} | — | April 15, 2010 | Mount Lemmon | Mount Lemmon Survey | · | 2.9 km | MPC · JPL |
| 536752 | 2015 FP_{19} | — | February 4, 2006 | Catalina | CSS | JUN | 830 m | MPC · JPL |
| 536753 | 2015 FU_{20} | — | January 3, 2009 | Catalina | CSS | TIR | 3.0 km | MPC · JPL |
| 536754 | 2015 FT_{21} | — | February 18, 2015 | Haleakala | Pan-STARRS 1 | · | 940 m | MPC · JPL |
| 536755 | 2015 FL_{23} | — | December 31, 2013 | Catalina | CSS | · | 2.6 km | MPC · JPL |
| 536756 | 2015 FU_{23} | — | May 17, 2010 | Kitt Peak | Spacewatch | · | 2.8 km | MPC · JPL |
| 536757 | 2015 FG_{39} | — | May 5, 2011 | Mount Lemmon | Mount Lemmon Survey | · | 1.1 km | MPC · JPL |
| 536758 | 2015 FR_{40} | — | October 14, 2013 | Kitt Peak | Spacewatch | · | 890 m | MPC · JPL |
| 536759 | 2015 FW_{40} | — | January 31, 2015 | Haleakala | Pan-STARRS 1 | · | 1.5 km | MPC · JPL |
| 536760 | 2015 FV_{41} | — | April 14, 2007 | Mount Lemmon | Mount Lemmon Survey | · | 950 m | MPC · JPL |
| 536761 | 2015 FX_{41} | — | October 3, 2006 | Mount Lemmon | Mount Lemmon Survey | · | 3.3 km | MPC · JPL |
| 536762 | 2015 FE_{43} | — | October 6, 2008 | Mount Lemmon | Mount Lemmon Survey | · | 1.3 km | MPC · JPL |
| 536763 | 2015 FG_{43} | — | August 12, 2012 | Kitt Peak | Spacewatch | · | 2.9 km | MPC · JPL |
| 536764 | 2015 FH_{43} | — | October 10, 2007 | Kitt Peak | Spacewatch | · | 2.1 km | MPC · JPL |
| 536765 | 2015 FG_{50} | — | March 16, 2007 | Kitt Peak | Spacewatch | · | 1.6 km | MPC · JPL |
| 536766 | 2015 FP_{52} | — | October 28, 2014 | Haleakala | Pan-STARRS 1 | · | 1.5 km | MPC · JPL |
| 536767 | 2015 FO_{54} | — | December 8, 2014 | Haleakala | Pan-STARRS 1 | · | 1.6 km | MPC · JPL |
| 536768 | 2015 FD_{55} | — | March 26, 2011 | Haleakala | Pan-STARRS 1 | · | 1.4 km | MPC · JPL |
| 536769 | 2015 FA_{56} | — | November 1, 2013 | Mount Lemmon | Mount Lemmon Survey | · | 2.2 km | MPC · JPL |
| 536770 | 2015 FF_{60} | — | October 7, 2013 | Kitt Peak | Spacewatch | · | 2.2 km | MPC · JPL |
| 536771 | 2015 FV_{61} | — | October 4, 2013 | Mount Lemmon | Mount Lemmon Survey | · | 880 m | MPC · JPL |
| 536772 | 2015 FM_{64} | — | November 29, 2014 | Mount Lemmon | Mount Lemmon Survey | TIR | 3.3 km | MPC · JPL |
| 536773 | 2015 FR_{64} | — | February 20, 2015 | Haleakala | Pan-STARRS 1 | MAR | 1.0 km | MPC · JPL |
| 536774 | 2015 FU_{65} | — | December 20, 2009 | Mount Lemmon | Mount Lemmon Survey | · | 1.7 km | MPC · JPL |
| 536775 | 2015 FY_{65} | — | January 28, 2015 | Haleakala | Pan-STARRS 1 | · | 1.3 km | MPC · JPL |
| 536776 | 2015 FB_{66} | — | March 18, 2015 | Haleakala | Pan-STARRS 1 | · | 1.5 km | MPC · JPL |
| 536777 | 2015 FC_{66} | — | December 17, 2009 | Kitt Peak | Spacewatch | · | 2.6 km | MPC · JPL |
| 536778 | 2015 FA_{70} | — | March 10, 2011 | Mount Lemmon | Mount Lemmon Survey | · | 1.1 km | MPC · JPL |
| 536779 | 2015 FD_{73} | — | April 24, 2006 | Mount Lemmon | Mount Lemmon Survey | · | 1.6 km | MPC · JPL |
| 536780 | 2015 FH_{73} | — | February 13, 2010 | WISE | WISE | · | 3.0 km | MPC · JPL |
| 536781 | 2015 FK_{76} | — | May 29, 2003 | Kitt Peak | Spacewatch | · | 1.2 km | MPC · JPL |
| 536782 | 2015 FL_{77} | — | October 10, 2012 | Mount Lemmon | Mount Lemmon Survey | · | 1.5 km | MPC · JPL |
| 536783 | 2015 FJ_{79} | — | April 15, 2010 | Mount Lemmon | Mount Lemmon Survey | · | 3.1 km | MPC · JPL |
| 536784 | 2015 FL_{79} | — | November 20, 2008 | Kitt Peak | Spacewatch | · | 2.4 km | MPC · JPL |
| 536785 | 2015 FV_{82} | — | July 31, 2008 | Mount Lemmon | Mount Lemmon Survey | · | 2.2 km | MPC · JPL |
| 536786 | 2015 FE_{91} | — | May 26, 2011 | Mount Lemmon | Mount Lemmon Survey | · | 1.3 km | MPC · JPL |
| 536787 | 2015 FA_{95} | — | September 6, 2008 | Mount Lemmon | Mount Lemmon Survey | HNS | 870 m | MPC · JPL |
| 536788 | 2015 FP_{95} | — | February 9, 2010 | WISE | WISE | · | 1.3 km | MPC · JPL |
| 536789 | 2015 FQ_{97} | — | April 2, 2011 | Haleakala | Pan-STARRS 1 | (5) | 1.1 km | MPC · JPL |
| 536790 | 2015 FR_{98} | — | March 6, 2011 | Mount Lemmon | Mount Lemmon Survey | · | 920 m | MPC · JPL |
| 536791 | 2015 FB_{101} | — | March 25, 2011 | Haleakala | Pan-STARRS 1 | V | 500 m | MPC · JPL |
| 536792 | 2015 FK_{101} | — | January 20, 2015 | Haleakala | Pan-STARRS 1 | · | 1.7 km | MPC · JPL |
| 536793 | 2015 FB_{108} | — | January 23, 2015 | Haleakala | Pan-STARRS 1 | · | 1.1 km | MPC · JPL |
| 536794 | 2015 FD_{111} | — | January 22, 2015 | Haleakala | Pan-STARRS 1 | · | 1.2 km | MPC · JPL |
| 536795 | 2015 FU_{115} | — | September 8, 2008 | Kitt Peak | Spacewatch | (194) | 1.6 km | MPC · JPL |
| 536796 | 2015 FK_{116} | — | April 28, 2004 | Kitt Peak | Spacewatch | NYS | 1.1 km | MPC · JPL |
| 536797 | 2015 FR_{122} | — | January 25, 2015 | Haleakala | Pan-STARRS 1 | · | 1.2 km | MPC · JPL |
| 536798 | 2015 FD_{124} | — | February 2, 2006 | Kitt Peak | Spacewatch | · | 1.5 km | MPC · JPL |
| 536799 | 2015 FT_{131} | — | February 4, 2006 | Catalina | CSS | · | 2.7 km | MPC · JPL |
| 536800 | 2015 FS_{133} | — | January 23, 2015 | Haleakala | Pan-STARRS 1 | · | 1.1 km | MPC · JPL |

== 536801–536900 ==
back to top

| Designation | | | Discovery | | | Properties | | Ref |
| Permanent | Provisional | Named after | Date | Site | Discoverer(s) | Category | Diam. | Ref |
|---|---|---|---|---|---|---|---|---|
| 536801 | 2015 FD_{135} | — | March 14, 2007 | Mount Lemmon | Mount Lemmon Survey | · | 1.2 km | MPC · JPL |
| 536802 | 2015 FU_{135} | — | August 29, 2006 | Kitt Peak | Spacewatch | EOS | 2.1 km | MPC · JPL |
| 536803 | 2015 FP_{136} | — | November 4, 1996 | Kitt Peak | Spacewatch | T_{j} (2.99) | 3.4 km | MPC · JPL |
| 536804 | 2015 FU_{139} | — | November 5, 2005 | Kitt Peak | Spacewatch | · | 1.1 km | MPC · JPL |
| 536805 | 2015 FE_{140} | — | November 27, 2013 | Haleakala | Pan-STARRS 1 | · | 1.4 km | MPC · JPL |
| 536806 | 2015 FF_{144} | — | October 24, 2008 | Kitt Peak | Spacewatch | HOF | 2.3 km | MPC · JPL |
| 536807 | 2015 FW_{144} | — | August 17, 2012 | Haleakala | Pan-STARRS 1 | MAS | 680 m | MPC · JPL |
| 536808 | 2015 FY_{147} | — | April 6, 2011 | Kitt Peak | Spacewatch | ADE | 1.3 km | MPC · JPL |
| 536809 | 2015 FA_{150} | — | April 13, 2011 | Mount Lemmon | Mount Lemmon Survey | HNS | 900 m | MPC · JPL |
| 536810 | 2015 FK_{150} | — | February 9, 2010 | Mount Lemmon | Mount Lemmon Survey | · | 1.4 km | MPC · JPL |
| 536811 | 2015 FU_{151} | — | April 26, 2011 | Mount Lemmon | Mount Lemmon Survey | · | 990 m | MPC · JPL |
| 536812 | 2015 FU_{154} | — | July 6, 2002 | Palomar | NEAT | · | 1.6 km | MPC · JPL |
| 536813 | 2015 FH_{156} | — | March 21, 2015 | Haleakala | Pan-STARRS 1 | AGN | 980 m | MPC · JPL |
| 536814 | 2015 FU_{158} | — | January 10, 2007 | Kitt Peak | Spacewatch | · | 1.1 km | MPC · JPL |
| 536815 | 2015 FU_{165} | — | September 18, 2012 | Kitt Peak | Spacewatch | · | 1.5 km | MPC · JPL |
| 536816 | 2015 FF_{168} | — | March 21, 2015 | Haleakala | Pan-STARRS 1 | · | 1.1 km | MPC · JPL |
| 536817 | 2015 FG_{171} | — | February 6, 2006 | Kitt Peak | Spacewatch | JUN | 970 m | MPC · JPL |
| 536818 | 2015 FH_{171} | — | January 12, 2010 | Kitt Peak | Spacewatch | · | 1.4 km | MPC · JPL |
| 536819 | 2015 FZ_{171} | — | May 1, 2011 | Haleakala | Pan-STARRS 1 | · | 980 m | MPC · JPL |
| 536820 | 2015 FG_{174} | — | March 21, 2015 | Haleakala | Pan-STARRS 1 | · | 1.3 km | MPC · JPL |
| 536821 | 2015 FM_{174} | — | January 25, 2015 | Haleakala | Pan-STARRS 1 | MAR | 900 m | MPC · JPL |
| 536822 | 2015 FV_{174} | — | May 15, 2010 | WISE | WISE | · | 3.0 km | MPC · JPL |
| 536823 | 2015 FJ_{175} | — | November 7, 2007 | Kitt Peak | Spacewatch | EOS | 1.7 km | MPC · JPL |
| 536824 | 2015 FE_{176} | — | October 20, 2012 | Haleakala | Pan-STARRS 1 | EOS | 2.0 km | MPC · JPL |
| 536825 | 2015 FD_{178} | — | January 22, 2015 | Haleakala | Pan-STARRS 1 | · | 1.4 km | MPC · JPL |
| 536826 | 2015 FB_{182} | — | October 23, 2013 | Haleakala | Pan-STARRS 1 | · | 1.0 km | MPC · JPL |
| 536827 | 2015 FG_{183} | — | March 14, 2010 | Kitt Peak | Spacewatch | · | 4.0 km | MPC · JPL |
| 536828 | 2015 FN_{184} | — | April 30, 2006 | Kitt Peak | Spacewatch | AGN | 1.6 km | MPC · JPL |
| 536829 | 2015 FD_{185} | — | September 4, 2008 | Kitt Peak | Spacewatch | NEM | 2.0 km | MPC · JPL |
| 536830 | 2015 FV_{186} | — | November 1, 2007 | Kitt Peak | Spacewatch | · | 2.7 km | MPC · JPL |
| 536831 | 2015 FG_{187} | — | September 25, 2007 | Mount Lemmon | Mount Lemmon Survey | · | 2.6 km | MPC · JPL |
| 536832 | 2015 FB_{194} | — | February 19, 2015 | Kitt Peak | Spacewatch | · | 830 m | MPC · JPL |
| 536833 | 2015 FX_{201} | — | October 30, 2005 | Socorro | LINEAR | (5) | 1.2 km | MPC · JPL |
| 536834 | 2015 FA_{204} | — | December 2, 2008 | Kitt Peak | Spacewatch | · | 1.7 km | MPC · JPL |
| 536835 | 2015 FL_{205} | — | November 4, 2004 | Kitt Peak | Spacewatch | DOR | 2.1 km | MPC · JPL |
| 536836 | 2015 FZ_{206} | — | March 14, 2011 | Mount Lemmon | Mount Lemmon Survey | · | 800 m | MPC · JPL |
| 536837 | 2015 FB_{209} | — | January 19, 2015 | Mount Lemmon | Mount Lemmon Survey | · | 2.1 km | MPC · JPL |
| 536838 | 2015 FX_{212} | — | February 23, 2015 | Haleakala | Pan-STARRS 1 | · | 1.8 km | MPC · JPL |
| 536839 | 2015 FE_{213} | — | June 10, 2007 | Kitt Peak | Spacewatch | · | 1.1 km | MPC · JPL |
| 536840 | 2015 FQ_{213} | — | April 14, 2011 | Mount Lemmon | Mount Lemmon Survey | · | 1.3 km | MPC · JPL |
| 536841 | 2015 FT_{213} | — | November 12, 2013 | Kitt Peak | Spacewatch | · | 1.7 km | MPC · JPL |
| 536842 | 2015 FX_{213} | — | February 7, 2007 | Kitt Peak | Spacewatch | PHO | 680 m | MPC · JPL |
| 536843 | 2015 FO_{214} | — | February 7, 2006 | Mount Lemmon | Mount Lemmon Survey | EUN | 1.5 km | MPC · JPL |
| 536844 | 2015 FD_{215} | — | August 19, 2006 | Kitt Peak | Spacewatch | · | 2.4 km | MPC · JPL |
| 536845 | 2015 FS_{215} | — | April 16, 2005 | Kitt Peak | Spacewatch | · | 2.3 km | MPC · JPL |
| 536846 | 2015 FR_{216} | — | February 25, 2011 | Kitt Peak | Spacewatch | · | 760 m | MPC · JPL |
| 536847 | 2015 FU_{218} | — | February 12, 2010 | WISE | WISE | KON | 2.4 km | MPC · JPL |
| 536848 | 2015 FA_{221} | — | November 26, 2009 | Mount Lemmon | Mount Lemmon Survey | MRX | 950 m | MPC · JPL |
| 536849 | 2015 FN_{221} | — | May 9, 2004 | Kitt Peak | Spacewatch | · | 1.0 km | MPC · JPL |
| 536850 | 2015 FQ_{221} | — | February 18, 2015 | Haleakala | Pan-STARRS 1 | · | 1.0 km | MPC · JPL |
| 536851 | 2015 FX_{228} | — | April 26, 2011 | Mount Lemmon | Mount Lemmon Survey | · | 970 m | MPC · JPL |
| 536852 | 2015 FZ_{235} | — | September 18, 2007 | Kitt Peak | Spacewatch | · | 2.1 km | MPC · JPL |
| 536853 | 2015 FS_{239} | — | November 4, 2013 | Mount Lemmon | Mount Lemmon Survey | V | 590 m | MPC · JPL |
| 536854 | 2015 FU_{249} | — | October 10, 2007 | Kitt Peak | Spacewatch | · | 2.7 km | MPC · JPL |
| 536855 | 2015 FP_{260} | — | January 10, 2011 | Mount Lemmon | Mount Lemmon Survey | · | 1.1 km | MPC · JPL |
| 536856 | 2015 FQ_{261} | — | August 21, 2006 | Kitt Peak | Spacewatch | HYG | 2.8 km | MPC · JPL |
| 536857 | 2015 FR_{264} | — | March 13, 2005 | Mount Lemmon | Mount Lemmon Survey | · | 2.4 km | MPC · JPL |
| 536858 | 2015 FU_{264} | — | February 16, 2015 | XuYi | PMO NEO Survey Program | · | 1.9 km | MPC · JPL |
| 536859 | 2015 FP_{268} | — | April 13, 2004 | Kitt Peak | Spacewatch | · | 3.0 km | MPC · JPL |
| 536860 | 2015 FV_{269} | — | March 14, 2007 | Mount Lemmon | Mount Lemmon Survey | · | 1 km | MPC · JPL |
| 536861 | 2015 FU_{275} | — | November 29, 2013 | Mount Lemmon | Mount Lemmon Survey | EOS | 1.7 km | MPC · JPL |
| 536862 | 2015 FP_{278} | — | September 7, 2008 | Mount Lemmon | Mount Lemmon Survey | · | 1.8 km | MPC · JPL |
| 536863 | 2015 FZ_{283} | — | November 1, 2008 | Mount Lemmon | Mount Lemmon Survey | · | 1.8 km | MPC · JPL |
| 536864 | 2015 FB_{287} | — | March 23, 2006 | Catalina | CSS | · | 1.7 km | MPC · JPL |
| 536865 | 2015 FQ_{287} | — | March 29, 2011 | Kitt Peak | Spacewatch | · | 1.2 km | MPC · JPL |
| 536866 | 2015 FW_{289} | — | December 7, 2008 | Mount Lemmon | Mount Lemmon Survey | · | 3.3 km | MPC · JPL |
| 536867 | 2015 FW_{292} | — | September 17, 2012 | Mount Lemmon | Mount Lemmon Survey | · | 2.0 km | MPC · JPL |
| 536868 | 2015 FL_{294} | — | September 29, 2003 | Socorro | LINEAR | · | 1.1 km | MPC · JPL |
| 536869 | 2015 FP_{295} | — | May 24, 2011 | Haleakala | Pan-STARRS 1 | · | 1.6 km | MPC · JPL |
| 536870 | 2015 FR_{297} | — | November 13, 2006 | Catalina | CSS | ARM | 4.0 km | MPC · JPL |
| 536871 | 2015 FX_{297} | — | April 30, 2011 | Haleakala | Pan-STARRS 1 | EUN | 1.0 km | MPC · JPL |
| 536872 | 2015 FH_{298} | — | October 20, 2007 | Mount Lemmon | Mount Lemmon Survey | · | 2.4 km | MPC · JPL |
| 536873 | 2015 FR_{298} | — | February 27, 2006 | Kitt Peak | Spacewatch | · | 1.6 km | MPC · JPL |
| 536874 | 2015 FH_{299} | — | March 28, 2015 | Haleakala | Pan-STARRS 1 | CLO | 1.8 km | MPC · JPL |
| 536875 | 2015 FZ_{299} | — | January 18, 2002 | Cima Ekar | ADAS | · | 1.4 km | MPC · JPL |
| 536876 | 2015 FD_{301} | — | November 4, 2007 | Mount Lemmon | Mount Lemmon Survey | · | 2.8 km | MPC · JPL |
| 536877 | 2015 FH_{302} | — | April 30, 2011 | Haleakala | Pan-STARRS 1 | · | 1.1 km | MPC · JPL |
| 536878 | 2015 FQ_{302} | — | October 21, 2012 | Mount Lemmon | Mount Lemmon Survey | · | 1.3 km | MPC · JPL |
| 536879 | 2015 FO_{303} | — | March 28, 2015 | Haleakala | Pan-STARRS 1 | · | 1.4 km | MPC · JPL |
| 536880 | 2015 FW_{303} | — | January 29, 2009 | Mount Lemmon | Mount Lemmon Survey | · | 1.6 km | MPC · JPL |
| 536881 | 2015 FB_{304} | — | April 27, 2011 | Mount Lemmon | Mount Lemmon Survey | · | 1.1 km | MPC · JPL |
| 536882 | 2015 FW_{304} | — | March 28, 2015 | Haleakala | Pan-STARRS 1 | · | 1.7 km | MPC · JPL |
| 536883 | 2015 FJ_{305} | — | April 14, 2002 | Kitt Peak | Spacewatch | · | 1.4 km | MPC · JPL |
| 536884 | 2015 FJ_{312} | — | October 9, 2007 | Mount Lemmon | Mount Lemmon Survey | (5651) | 2.8 km | MPC · JPL |
| 536885 | 2015 FC_{313} | — | February 6, 2006 | Kitt Peak | Spacewatch | HNS | 990 m | MPC · JPL |
| 536886 | 2015 FL_{314} | — | January 8, 2010 | Mount Lemmon | Mount Lemmon Survey | · | 1.6 km | MPC · JPL |
| 536887 | 2015 FS_{314} | — | March 25, 2015 | Haleakala | Pan-STARRS 1 | · | 1.7 km | MPC · JPL |
| 536888 | 2015 FO_{317} | — | December 24, 2013 | Mount Lemmon | Mount Lemmon Survey | MRX | 970 m | MPC · JPL |
| 536889 | 2015 FH_{318} | — | October 24, 2013 | Mount Lemmon | Mount Lemmon Survey | · | 1.6 km | MPC · JPL |
| 536890 | 2015 FU_{318} | — | March 25, 2015 | Haleakala | Pan-STARRS 1 | · | 1.5 km | MPC · JPL |
| 536891 | 2015 FG_{320} | — | April 22, 2007 | Mount Lemmon | Mount Lemmon Survey | · | 890 m | MPC · JPL |
| 536892 | 2015 FH_{320} | — | November 6, 2007 | Mount Lemmon | Mount Lemmon Survey | · | 3.3 km | MPC · JPL |
| 536893 | 2015 FJ_{320} | — | January 23, 2015 | Haleakala | Pan-STARRS 1 | · | 990 m | MPC · JPL |
| 536894 | 2015 FT_{322} | — | November 26, 2013 | Haleakala | Pan-STARRS 1 | · | 1.6 km | MPC · JPL |
| 536895 | 2015 FZ_{322} | — | April 14, 2011 | Mount Lemmon | Mount Lemmon Survey | · | 960 m | MPC · JPL |
| 536896 | 2015 FC_{323} | — | April 9, 2010 | Mount Lemmon | Mount Lemmon Survey | · | 2.3 km | MPC · JPL |
| 536897 | 2015 FG_{323} | — | October 6, 2012 | Haleakala | Pan-STARRS 1 | · | 3.7 km | MPC · JPL |
| 536898 | 2015 FS_{323} | — | March 15, 2004 | Kitt Peak | Spacewatch | · | 2.6 km | MPC · JPL |
| 536899 | 2015 FB_{324} | — | December 11, 2013 | Haleakala | Pan-STARRS 1 | · | 2.0 km | MPC · JPL |
| 536900 | 2015 FE_{324} | — | January 22, 2006 | Anderson Mesa | LONEOS | · | 1.6 km | MPC · JPL |

== 536901–537000 ==
back to top

| Designation | | | Discovery | | | Properties | | Ref |
| Permanent | Provisional | Named after | Date | Site | Discoverer(s) | Category | Diam. | Ref |
|---|---|---|---|---|---|---|---|---|
| 536901 | 2015 FD_{325} | — | May 22, 2006 | Kitt Peak | Spacewatch | · | 2.0 km | MPC · JPL |
| 536902 | 2015 FH_{325} | — | January 29, 2009 | Mount Lemmon | Mount Lemmon Survey | EOS | 1.9 km | MPC · JPL |
| 536903 | 2015 FT_{327} | — | October 31, 2013 | Mount Lemmon | Mount Lemmon Survey | · | 760 m | MPC · JPL |
| 536904 | 2015 FX_{328} | — | November 27, 2013 | Haleakala | Pan-STARRS 1 | · | 860 m | MPC · JPL |
| 536905 | 2015 FD_{329} | — | November 8, 2007 | Kitt Peak | Spacewatch | VER | 2.4 km | MPC · JPL |
| 536906 | 2015 FL_{329} | — | October 14, 2007 | Mount Lemmon | Mount Lemmon Survey | EOS | 1.5 km | MPC · JPL |
| 536907 | 2015 FY_{329} | — | June 16, 2010 | WISE | WISE | · | 3.5 km | MPC · JPL |
| 536908 | 2015 FQ_{330} | — | April 14, 2005 | Kitt Peak | Spacewatch | EOS | 2.7 km | MPC · JPL |
| 536909 | 2015 FM_{333} | — | January 22, 2015 | Haleakala | Pan-STARRS 1 | · | 1.5 km | MPC · JPL |
| 536910 | 2015 FA_{335} | — | March 30, 2015 | Haleakala | Pan-STARRS 1 | MAR | 840 m | MPC · JPL |
| 536911 | 2015 FH_{336} | — | February 27, 2015 | Haleakala | Pan-STARRS 1 | · | 1.8 km | MPC · JPL |
| 536912 | 2015 FR_{336} | — | March 30, 2015 | Haleakala | Pan-STARRS 1 | · | 1.3 km | MPC · JPL |
| 536913 | 2015 FS_{336} | — | September 14, 2007 | Mount Lemmon | Mount Lemmon Survey | · | 1.5 km | MPC · JPL |
| 536914 | 2015 FB_{338} | — | October 20, 2012 | Haleakala | Pan-STARRS 1 | · | 1.4 km | MPC · JPL |
| 536915 | 2015 FK_{339} | — | April 27, 2011 | Kitt Peak | Spacewatch | · | 920 m | MPC · JPL |
| 536916 | 2015 FY_{339} | — | January 26, 2015 | Haleakala | Pan-STARRS 1 | HNS | 1.1 km | MPC · JPL |
| 536917 | 2015 FJ_{340} | — | September 28, 2008 | Catalina | CSS | · | 3.1 km | MPC · JPL |
| 536918 | 2015 FT_{341} | — | January 19, 2010 | WISE | WISE | · | 2.2 km | MPC · JPL |
| 536919 | 2015 FL_{345} | — | March 21, 2015 | Haleakala | Pan-STARRS 1 | cubewano (hot) | 315 km | MPC · JPL |
| 536920 | 2015 FM_{345} | — | March 21, 2015 | Haleakala | Pan-STARRS 1 | cubewano (hot) | 265 km | MPC · JPL |
| 536921 | 2015 FO_{345} | — | April 5, 2014 | Haleakala | Pan-STARRS 1 | other TNO | 137 km | MPC · JPL |
| 536922 | 2015 FP_{345} | — | March 25, 2015 | Haleakala | Pan-STARRS 1 | res · 4:7 | 161 km | MPC · JPL |
| 536923 | 2015 FX_{349} | — | October 12, 2007 | Mount Lemmon | Mount Lemmon Survey | · | 2.4 km | MPC · JPL |
| 536924 | 2015 FM_{352} | — | July 5, 2005 | Kitt Peak | Spacewatch | · | 1.3 km | MPC · JPL |
| 536925 | 2015 FG_{353} | — | October 18, 2012 | Haleakala | Pan-STARRS 1 | · | 2.6 km | MPC · JPL |
| 536926 | 2015 FN_{362} | — | March 30, 2011 | Mount Lemmon | Mount Lemmon Survey | PHO | 800 m | MPC · JPL |
| 536927 | 2015 FL_{365} | — | November 8, 2009 | Mount Lemmon | Mount Lemmon Survey | · | 1.2 km | MPC · JPL |
| 536928 | 2015 FG_{366} | — | November 19, 2008 | Kitt Peak | Spacewatch | · | 2.1 km | MPC · JPL |
| 536929 | 2015 FG_{367} | — | October 24, 2008 | Kitt Peak | Spacewatch | · | 1.8 km | MPC · JPL |
| 536930 | 2015 FG_{368} | — | October 9, 2007 | Catalina | CSS | · | 3.3 km | MPC · JPL |
| 536931 | 2015 FW_{368} | — | March 26, 2011 | Haleakala | Pan-STARRS 1 | · | 1.2 km | MPC · JPL |
| 536932 | 2015 FA_{372} | — | January 28, 2015 | Haleakala | Pan-STARRS 1 | · | 1.9 km | MPC · JPL |
| 536933 | 2015 FB_{372} | — | December 6, 2013 | Haleakala | Pan-STARRS 1 | · | 2.0 km | MPC · JPL |
| 536934 | 2015 FB_{373} | — | March 18, 2015 | Haleakala | Pan-STARRS 1 | PHO | 840 m | MPC · JPL |
| 536935 | 2015 FC_{374} | — | May 10, 2007 | Mount Lemmon | Mount Lemmon Survey | · | 890 m | MPC · JPL |
| 536936 | 2015 FT_{375} | — | October 16, 2007 | Mount Lemmon | Mount Lemmon Survey | EOS | 1.8 km | MPC · JPL |
| 536937 | 2015 FJ_{378} | — | December 22, 2008 | Mount Lemmon | Mount Lemmon Survey | · | 2.6 km | MPC · JPL |
| 536938 | 2015 FW_{378} | — | January 3, 2009 | Mount Lemmon | Mount Lemmon Survey | (21885) | 2.7 km | MPC · JPL |
| 536939 | 2015 FS_{380} | — | September 25, 2012 | Mount Lemmon | Mount Lemmon Survey | EOS | 1.7 km | MPC · JPL |
| 536940 | 2015 FC_{382} | — | October 21, 2004 | Socorro | LINEAR | · | 2.9 km | MPC · JPL |
| 536941 | 2015 FN_{383} | — | January 1, 2009 | Kitt Peak | Spacewatch | · | 2.4 km | MPC · JPL |
| 536942 | 2015 FY_{384} | — | June 16, 2012 | Haleakala | Pan-STARRS 1 | · | 1.8 km | MPC · JPL |
| 536943 | 2015 FZ_{384} | — | September 13, 2007 | Kitt Peak | Spacewatch | · | 3.5 km | MPC · JPL |
| 536944 | 2015 FL_{387} | — | June 17, 2007 | Kitt Peak | Spacewatch | · | 940 m | MPC · JPL |
| 536945 | 2015 FV_{387} | — | January 10, 2010 | Kitt Peak | Spacewatch | · | 1.5 km | MPC · JPL |
| 536946 | 2015 FM_{389} | — | September 10, 2013 | Haleakala | Pan-STARRS 1 | · | 1.1 km | MPC · JPL |
| 536947 | 2015 FS_{394} | — | March 29, 2015 | Haleakala | Pan-STARRS 1 | H | 370 m | MPC · JPL |
| 536948 | 2015 FT_{394} | — | October 2, 2008 | Mount Lemmon | Mount Lemmon Survey | HNS | 1.1 km | MPC · JPL |
| 536949 | 2015 FM_{395} | — | March 22, 2015 | Haleakala | Pan-STARRS 1 | · | 1.3 km | MPC · JPL |
| 536950 | 2015 FC_{396} | — | October 24, 2013 | Mount Lemmon | Mount Lemmon Survey | · | 2.9 km | MPC · JPL |
| 536951 | 2015 FQ_{396} | — | October 18, 2012 | Haleakala | Pan-STARRS 1 | AGN | 970 m | MPC · JPL |
| 536952 | 2015 FY_{396} | — | December 11, 2013 | Haleakala | Pan-STARRS 1 | (5) | 1.1 km | MPC · JPL |
| 536953 | 2015 FZ_{396} | — | October 20, 2012 | Haleakala | Pan-STARRS 1 | EOS | 1.9 km | MPC · JPL |
| 536954 | 2015 FC_{397} | — | March 1, 2009 | Kitt Peak | Spacewatch | · | 2.5 km | MPC · JPL |
| 536955 | 2015 FE_{397} | — | March 9, 2006 | Mount Lemmon | Mount Lemmon Survey | EUN | 1.0 km | MPC · JPL |
| 536956 | 2015 FG_{397} | — | March 22, 2015 | Haleakala | Pan-STARRS 1 | · | 1.8 km | MPC · JPL |
| 536957 | 2015 FH_{397} | — | December 2, 1996 | Kitt Peak | Spacewatch | · | 3.3 km | MPC · JPL |
| 536958 | 2015 FK_{397} | — | February 14, 2010 | Kitt Peak | Spacewatch | · | 1.6 km | MPC · JPL |
| 536959 | 2015 FL_{397} | — | October 3, 2006 | Mount Lemmon | Mount Lemmon Survey | · | 3.0 km | MPC · JPL |
| 536960 | 2015 FM_{397} | — | March 9, 2007 | Mount Lemmon | Mount Lemmon Survey | MAS | 680 m | MPC · JPL |
| 536961 | 2015 FN_{397} | — | October 3, 2006 | Mount Lemmon | Mount Lemmon Survey | · | 3.4 km | MPC · JPL |
| 536962 | 2015 FP_{397} | — | March 10, 2011 | Kitt Peak | Spacewatch | · | 1.1 km | MPC · JPL |
| 536963 | 2015 FQ_{397} | — | March 25, 2011 | Kitt Peak | Spacewatch | · | 980 m | MPC · JPL |
| 536964 | 2015 FT_{397} | — | January 27, 2007 | Mount Lemmon | Mount Lemmon Survey | · | 770 m | MPC · JPL |
| 536965 | 2015 FU_{397} | — | April 1, 2009 | Mount Lemmon | Mount Lemmon Survey | · | 3.1 km | MPC · JPL |
| 536966 | 2015 FV_{401} | — | October 21, 2012 | Mount Lemmon | Mount Lemmon Survey | · | 1.8 km | MPC · JPL |
| 536967 | 2015 FW_{401} | — | October 17, 2012 | Mount Lemmon | Mount Lemmon Survey | · | 2.1 km | MPC · JPL |
| 536968 | 2015 FX_{401} | — | September 11, 2007 | Mount Lemmon | Mount Lemmon Survey | · | 1.9 km | MPC · JPL |
| 536969 | 2015 FD_{402} | — | January 28, 2015 | Haleakala | Pan-STARRS 1 | · | 1.1 km | MPC · JPL |
| 536970 | 2015 FH_{402} | — | June 7, 2010 | WISE | WISE | · | 2.8 km | MPC · JPL |
| 536971 | 2015 FJ_{402} | — | October 9, 2012 | Mount Lemmon | Mount Lemmon Survey | AEO | 960 m | MPC · JPL |
| 536972 | 2015 FL_{402} | — | November 12, 2007 | Mount Lemmon | Mount Lemmon Survey | EOS | 1.6 km | MPC · JPL |
| 536973 | 2015 FN_{402} | — | December 11, 2013 | Haleakala | Pan-STARRS 1 | EUN | 1.1 km | MPC · JPL |
| 536974 | 2015 FP_{402} | — | February 2, 2009 | Mount Lemmon | Mount Lemmon Survey | GEF | 1.3 km | MPC · JPL |
| 536975 | 2015 FQ_{402} | — | March 25, 2010 | Kitt Peak | Spacewatch | · | 1.7 km | MPC · JPL |
| 536976 | 2015 FV_{402} | — | November 13, 2012 | Mount Lemmon | Mount Lemmon Survey | · | 2.5 km | MPC · JPL |
| 536977 | 2015 FW_{402} | — | July 28, 2011 | Haleakala | Pan-STARRS 1 | EOS | 1.8 km | MPC · JPL |
| 536978 | 2015 FC_{403} | — | January 15, 2009 | Kitt Peak | Spacewatch | · | 1.3 km | MPC · JPL |
| 536979 | 2015 FG_{403} | — | November 7, 2008 | Mount Lemmon | Mount Lemmon Survey | · | 1.1 km | MPC · JPL |
| 536980 | 2015 FH_{403} | — | January 8, 2010 | Kitt Peak | Spacewatch | · | 1.4 km | MPC · JPL |
| 536981 | 2015 FJ_{403} | — | March 24, 2015 | Mount Lemmon | Mount Lemmon Survey | · | 1.3 km | MPC · JPL |
| 536982 | 2015 FN_{403} | — | March 27, 2015 | Haleakala | Pan-STARRS 1 | GAL | 1.3 km | MPC · JPL |
| 536983 | 2015 FO_{403} | — | March 28, 2015 | Haleakala | Pan-STARRS 1 | EUN | 860 m | MPC · JPL |
| 536984 | 2015 FY_{403} | — | March 17, 2015 | Haleakala | Pan-STARRS 1 | · | 2.1 km | MPC · JPL |
| 536985 | 2015 FB_{404} | — | November 4, 2012 | Mount Lemmon | Mount Lemmon Survey | MAR | 900 m | MPC · JPL |
| 536986 | 2015 FC_{404} | — | February 19, 2009 | Kitt Peak | Spacewatch | · | 3.0 km | MPC · JPL |
| 536987 | 2015 FF_{404} | — | January 29, 2009 | Mount Lemmon | Mount Lemmon Survey | · | 2.2 km | MPC · JPL |
| 536988 | 2015 FK_{404} | — | March 28, 2015 | Haleakala | Pan-STARRS 1 | · | 1.8 km | MPC · JPL |
| 536989 | 2015 FL_{404} | — | January 3, 2009 | Mount Lemmon | Mount Lemmon Survey | · | 1.8 km | MPC · JPL |
| 536990 | 2015 FM_{404} | — | February 9, 2014 | Kitt Peak | Spacewatch | · | 2.2 km | MPC · JPL |
| 536991 | 2015 FP_{404} | — | September 25, 2008 | Kitt Peak | Spacewatch | · | 1.5 km | MPC · JPL |
| 536992 | 2015 FU_{404} | — | December 10, 2001 | Kitt Peak | Spacewatch | VER | 2.3 km | MPC · JPL |
| 536993 | 2015 FV_{404} | — | March 18, 2010 | Mount Lemmon | Mount Lemmon Survey | KOR | 1.3 km | MPC · JPL |
| 536994 | 2015 FX_{404} | — | October 26, 2012 | Haleakala | Pan-STARRS 1 | · | 3.1 km | MPC · JPL |
| 536995 | 2015 FB_{405} | — | August 13, 2012 | Haleakala | Pan-STARRS 1 | · | 950 m | MPC · JPL |
| 536996 | 2015 FC_{405} | — | January 28, 2015 | Haleakala | Pan-STARRS 1 | · | 1.5 km | MPC · JPL |
| 536997 | 2015 FG_{405} | — | October 18, 2012 | Haleakala | Pan-STARRS 1 | · | 2.4 km | MPC · JPL |
| 536998 | 2015 FL_{405} | — | December 18, 2009 | Kitt Peak | Spacewatch | MIS | 1.9 km | MPC · JPL |
| 536999 | 2015 FM_{405} | — | February 22, 2003 | Kitt Peak | Spacewatch | · | 3.1 km | MPC · JPL |
| 537000 | 2015 FN_{405} | — | October 1, 2008 | Catalina | CSS | · | 2.0 km | MPC · JPL |

back to top
