= List of minor planets: 890001–891000 =

The following is a partial list of minor planets, running from minor-planet number 890001 through 891000, inclusive. The primary data for this and other partial lists is based on JPL's "Small-Body Orbital Elements" and data available from the Minor Planet Center. Critical list information is also provided by the MPC, unless otherwise specified from Lowell Observatory. A detailed description of the table's columns and additional sources are given on the main page including a complete list of every page in this series, and a statistical break-up on the dynamical classification of minor planets.

Also see the summary list of all named bodies in numerical and alphabetical order, and the corresponding naming citations for the number range of this particular list. New namings may only be added to this list after official publication, as the preannouncement of names is condemned by the Working Group for Small Bodies Nomenclature of the International Astronomical Union.

Near-Earth obj.	MBA (inner)	MBA (outer)	Centaur
Mars-crosser	MBA (middle)	Jupiter trojan	Trans-Neptunian obj.
Unclassified

== 890001–890100 ==
Designation			Discovery			Properties		Ref
Permanent	Provisional	Named after	Date	Site	Discoverer(s)	Category	Diam.	Ref
890001	2013 CF_{260}	—	February 14, 2013	Mount Lemmon	Mount Lemmon Survey	·	1.1 km	MPC · JPL
890002	2013 CK_{260}	—	May 14, 2005	Mount Lemmon	Mount Lemmon Survey	·	1.0 km	MPC · JPL
890003	2013 CZ_{260}	—	February 15, 2013	Haleakala	Pan-STARRS 1	·	1.1 km	MPC · JPL
890004	2013 CW_{268}	—	February 3, 2013	Haleakala	Pan-STARRS 1	L4	5.2 km	MPC · JPL
890005	2013 DG_{14}	—	February 17, 2013	Mount Lemmon	Mount Lemmon Survey	·	1.1 km	MPC · JPL
890006	2013 DF_{18}	—	March 6, 2013	Haleakala	Pan-STARRS 1	·	800 m	MPC · JPL
890007	2013 DG_{18}	—	February 17, 2013	Mount Lemmon	Mount Lemmon Survey	·	1.7 km	MPC · JPL
890008	2013 DK_{18}	—	February 18, 2013	Mount Lemmon	Mount Lemmon Survey	·	840 m	MPC · JPL
890009	2013 DS_{18}	—	February 17, 2013	Kitt Peak	Spacewatch	·	1.0 km	MPC · JPL
890010	2013 DD_{21}	—	February 16, 2013	Mount Lemmon	Mount Lemmon Survey	·	430 m	MPC · JPL
890011	2013 DQ_{21}	—	February 16, 2013	Mount Lemmon	Mount Lemmon Survey	·	810 m	MPC · JPL
890012	2013 DX_{21}	—	February 18, 2013	Kitt Peak	Spacewatch	H	290 m	MPC · JPL
890013	2013 DY_{21}	—	February 16, 2013	Mount Lemmon	Mount Lemmon Survey	·	1.3 km	MPC · JPL
890014	2013 DP_{24}	—	February 17, 2013	Kitt Peak	Spacewatch	·	1.1 km	MPC · JPL
890015	2013 EX_{5}	—	February 16, 2013	Kitt Peak	Spacewatch	·	1.1 km	MPC · JPL
890016	2013 EL_{10}	—	March 4, 2013	Haleakala	Pan-STARRS 1	·	1.5 km	MPC · JPL
890017	2013 EE_{14}	—	February 14, 2013	Haleakala	Pan-STARRS 1	·	1.3 km	MPC · JPL
890018	2013 EJ_{25}	—	March 7, 2013	Kitt Peak	Spacewatch	·	1.1 km	MPC · JPL
890019	2013 EJ_{28}	—	March 9, 2013	Haleakala	Pan-STARRS 1	H	340 m	MPC · JPL
890020	2013 EZ_{40}	—	March 11, 2013	Atacama	I. de la Cueva	H	330 m	MPC · JPL
890021	2013 EX_{47}	—	March 6, 2013	Haleakala	Pan-STARRS 1	·	560 m	MPC · JPL
890022	2013 EN_{50}	—	March 6, 2013	Haleakala	Pan-STARRS 1	·	1.2 km	MPC · JPL
890023	2013 ET_{53}	—	February 7, 2013	Kitt Peak	Spacewatch	H	310 m	MPC · JPL
890024	2013 EM_{55}	—	September 18, 2011	Mount Lemmon	Mount Lemmon Survey	·	970 m	MPC · JPL
890025	2013 EH_{59}	—	February 14, 2013	Kitt Peak	Spacewatch	·	470 m	MPC · JPL
890026	2013 EU_{61}	—	March 8, 2013	Haleakala	Pan-STARRS 1	EUN	810 m	MPC · JPL
890027	2013 ER_{75}	—	September 26, 2011	Mount Lemmon	Mount Lemmon Survey	·	1.2 km	MPC · JPL
890028	2013 EZ_{80}	—	February 17, 2013	Mount Lemmon	Mount Lemmon Survey	·	1.6 km	MPC · JPL
890029	2013 EF_{87}	—	March 11, 2013	Elena Remote	Oreshko, A.	·	450 m	MPC · JPL
890030	2013 ES_{89}	—	March 13, 2013	Catalina	CSS	AMO	540 m	MPC · JPL
890031	2013 EQ_{90}	—	March 18, 2009	Mount Lemmon	Mount Lemmon Survey	·	1.2 km	MPC · JPL
890032	2013 EH_{96}	—	April 19, 2002	Kitt Peak	Spacewatch	MAS	440 m	MPC · JPL
890033	2013 EW_{99}	—	January 20, 2009	Kitt Peak	Spacewatch	NYS	700 m	MPC · JPL
890034	2013 EF_{116}	—	March 12, 2013	Kitt Peak	Spacewatch	·	970 m	MPC · JPL
890035	2013 EJ_{116}	—	March 12, 2013	Kitt Peak	Spacewatch	·	730 m	MPC · JPL
890036	2013 ER_{118}	—	October 1, 2006	Kitt Peak	Spacewatch	H	410 m	MPC · JPL
890037	2013 EC_{130}	—	January 10, 2013	Haleakala	Pan-STARRS 1	·	420 m	MPC · JPL
890038	2013 EB_{135}	—	March 12, 2013	Kitt Peak	Research and Education Collaborative Occultation Network	·	850 m	MPC · JPL
890039	2013 EC_{139}	—	February 9, 2013	Haleakala	Pan-STARRS 1	·	1.0 km	MPC · JPL
890040	2013 EC_{140}	—	January 18, 2013	Mount Lemmon	Mount Lemmon Survey	·	740 m	MPC · JPL
890041	2013 EY_{154}	—	March 5, 2013	Haleakala	Pan-STARRS 1	H	390 m	MPC · JPL
890042	2013 EN_{156}	—	March 4, 2013	Haleakala	Pan-STARRS 1	·	1.2 km	MPC · JPL
890043	2013 ES_{157}	—	October 24, 2011	Haleakala	Pan-STARRS 1	·	980 m	MPC · JPL
890044	2013 EK_{161}	—	March 15, 2013	Mount Lemmon	Mount Lemmon Survey	·	470 m	MPC · JPL
890045	2013 EQ_{161}	—	March 15, 2013	Mount Lemmon	Mount Lemmon Survey	·	530 m	MPC · JPL
890046	2013 EB_{162}	—	March 5, 2013	Haleakala	Pan-STARRS 1	·	440 m	MPC · JPL
890047	2013 EQ_{164}	—	March 12, 2013	Mount Lemmon	Mount Lemmon Survey	·	1.7 km	MPC · JPL
890048	2013 ES_{164}	—	March 13, 2013	Haleakala	Pan-STARRS 1	H	310 m	MPC · JPL
890049	2013 EY_{165}	—	March 5, 2013	Haleakala	Pan-STARRS 1	·	1.3 km	MPC · JPL
890050	2013 EB_{167}	—	March 11, 2013	Mount Lemmon	Mount Lemmon Survey	·	940 m	MPC · JPL
890051	2013 EB_{169}	—	March 6, 2013	Haleakala	Pan-STARRS 1	·	480 m	MPC · JPL
890052	2013 EH_{170}	—	March 13, 2013	Catalina	CSS	·	660 m	MPC · JPL
890053	2013 ET_{172}	—	March 7, 2013	Mount Lemmon	Mount Lemmon Survey	·	1.1 km	MPC · JPL
890054	2013 EY_{173}	—	March 7, 2013	Mount Lemmon	Mount Lemmon Survey	·	1.1 km	MPC · JPL
890055	2013 EB_{174}	—	March 8, 2013	Haleakala	Pan-STARRS 1	·	1.1 km	MPC · JPL
890056	2013 EK_{176}	—	March 8, 2013	Haleakala	Pan-STARRS 1	H	300 m	MPC · JPL
890057	2013 EN_{176}	—	March 3, 2013	Haleakala	Pan-STARRS 1	H	320 m	MPC · JPL
890058	2013 ER_{176}	—	March 15, 2013	Kitt Peak	Spacewatch	·	360 m	MPC · JPL
890059	2013 EP_{184}	—	March 6, 2013	Haleakala	Pan-STARRS 1	·	440 m	MPC · JPL
890060	2013 EK_{186}	—	March 15, 2013	Mount Lemmon	Mount Lemmon Survey	·	860 m	MPC · JPL
890061	2013 FE_{5}	—	March 18, 2004	Kitt Peak	Spacewatch	·	1.1 km	MPC · JPL
890062	2013 FJ_{8}	—	March 19, 2013	Haleakala	Pan-STARRS 1	H	360 m	MPC · JPL
890063	2013 FO_{29}	—	March 17, 2013	Mount Lemmon	Mount Lemmon Survey	·	1.2 km	MPC · JPL
890064	2013 FJ_{30}	—	March 16, 2013	Mount Lemmon	Mount Lemmon Survey	·	1.5 km	MPC · JPL
890065	2013 FS_{30}	—	March 31, 2013	Mount Lemmon	Mount Lemmon Survey	·	440 m	MPC · JPL
890066	2013 FS_{31}	—	March 19, 2013	Haleakala	Pan-STARRS 1	·	1.2 km	MPC · JPL
890067	2013 FV_{31}	—	March 19, 2013	Haleakala	Pan-STARRS 1	·	1.0 km	MPC · JPL
890068	2013 FF_{34}	—	March 19, 2013	Haleakala	Pan-STARRS 1	·	1.2 km	MPC · JPL
890069	2013 FS_{35}	—	March 19, 2013	Haleakala	Pan-STARRS 1	·	910 m	MPC · JPL
890070	2013 FV_{35}	—	March 31, 2013	Mount Lemmon	Mount Lemmon Survey	THM	1.5 km	MPC · JPL
890071	2013 FH_{37}	—	March 31, 2013	Mount Lemmon	Mount Lemmon Survey	H	280 m	MPC · JPL
890072	2013 FR_{40}	—	April 28, 2009	Kitt Peak	Spacewatch	·	1.0 km	MPC · JPL
890073	2013 GP_{4}	—	March 23, 2013	Mount Lemmon	Mount Lemmon Survey	JUN	690 m	MPC · JPL
890074	2013 GF_{11}	—	April 1, 2013	Nogales	M. Schwartz, P. R. Holvorcem	·	1.7 km	MPC · JPL
890075	2013 GS_{16}	—	March 6, 2013	Haleakala	Pan-STARRS 1	JUN	650 m	MPC · JPL
890076	2013 GU_{35}	—	April 7, 2013	Mount Lemmon	Mount Lemmon Survey	·	420 m	MPC · JPL
890077	2013 GY_{35}	—	April 7, 2013	Mount Lemmon	Mount Lemmon Survey	·	760 m	MPC · JPL
890078	2013 GK_{36}	—	April 7, 2013	Mount Lemmon	Mount Lemmon Survey	·	1.1 km	MPC · JPL
890079	2013 GM_{39}	—	April 4, 2013	Haleakala	Pan-STARRS 1	·	470 m	MPC · JPL
890080	2013 GA_{50}	—	April 7, 2013	Kitt Peak	Spacewatch	·	1.1 km	MPC · JPL
890081	2013 GY_{59}	—	April 6, 2013	Mount Lemmon	Mount Lemmon Survey	·	400 m	MPC · JPL
890082	2013 GY_{62}	—	April 8, 2013	Kitt Peak	Spacewatch	·	440 m	MPC · JPL
890083	2013 GJ_{72}	—	April 8, 2013	Siding Spring	SSS	·	1.2 km	MPC · JPL
890084	2013 GX_{79}	—	April 13, 2013	Haleakala	Pan-STARRS 1	APO	240 m	MPC · JPL
890085	2013 GQ_{80}	—	March 31, 2013	Palomar	Palomar Transient Factory	H	410 m	MPC · JPL
890086	2013 GK_{81}	—	February 16, 2012	Haleakala	Pan-STARRS 1	·	1.7 km	MPC · JPL
890087	2013 GG_{107}	—	April 7, 2013	Mount Lemmon	Mount Lemmon Survey	·	1.4 km	MPC · JPL
890088	2013 GS_{114}	—	April 4, 2013	Palomar	Palomar Transient Factory	·	1.2 km	MPC · JPL
890089	2013 GB_{118}	—	March 19, 2013	Haleakala	Pan-STARRS 1	·	1.1 km	MPC · JPL
890090	2013 GJ_{129}	—	March 4, 2013	Haleakala	Pan-STARRS 1	H	350 m	MPC · JPL
890091	2013 GJ_{132}	—	March 17, 2013	Mount Lemmon	Mount Lemmon Survey	MAS	500 m	MPC · JPL
890092	2013 GL_{144}	—	April 6, 2013	Mount Lemmon	Mount Lemmon Survey	EUN	820 m	MPC · JPL
890093	2013 GR_{153}	—	April 12, 2013	Haleakala	Pan-STARRS 1	V	390 m	MPC · JPL
890094	2013 GJ_{154}	—	April 7, 2013	Mount Lemmon	Mount Lemmon Survey	·	480 m	MPC · JPL
890095	2013 GP_{154}	—	April 7, 2013	Mount Lemmon	Mount Lemmon Survey	MAS	620 m	MPC · JPL
890096	2013 GH_{155}	—	April 15, 2013	Haleakala	Pan-STARRS 1	·	500 m	MPC · JPL
890097	2013 GZ_{157}	—	April 1, 2013	Catalina	CSS	H	330 m	MPC · JPL
890098	2013 GJ_{160}	—	April 9, 2013	Haleakala	Pan-STARRS 1	·	490 m	MPC · JPL
890099	2013 GR_{162}	—	April 10, 2013	Haleakala	Pan-STARRS 1	·	470 m	MPC · JPL
890100	2013 GY_{162}	—	April 7, 2013	Kitt Peak	Spacewatch	·	2.0 km	MPC · JPL

== 890101–890200 ==
back to top

Designation			Discovery			Properties		Ref
Permanent	Provisional	Named after	Date	Site	Discoverer(s)	Category	Diam.	Ref
890101	2013 GN_{164}	—	April 10, 2013	Haleakala	Pan-STARRS 1	·	1.3 km	MPC · JPL
890102	2013 GB_{167}	—	April 10, 2013	Haleakala	Pan-STARRS 1	EUN	820 m	MPC · JPL
890103	2013 GJ_{167}	—	April 12, 2013	Haleakala	Pan-STARRS 1	·	1.3 km	MPC · JPL
890104	2013 HW_{2}	—	April 18, 2013	Mount Lemmon	Mount Lemmon Survey	H	430 m	MPC · JPL
890105	2013 HD_{5}	—	April 18, 2013	Mount Lemmon	Mount Lemmon Survey	·	1.3 km	MPC · JPL
890106	2013 HX_{9}	—	April 19, 2013	Mount Lemmon	Mount Lemmon Survey	·	1.4 km	MPC · JPL
890107	2013 HE_{15}	—	April 11, 2013	Mount Lemmon	Mount Lemmon Survey	H	390 m	MPC · JPL
890108	2013 HQ_{26}	—	April 29, 2013	Haleakala	Pan-STARRS 1	H	400 m	MPC · JPL
890109	2013 HH_{28}	—	March 14, 2013	Mount Lemmon	Mount Lemmon Survey	·	1.3 km	MPC · JPL
890110	2013 HE_{29}	—	April 9, 2013	Haleakala	Pan-STARRS 1	·	1.4 km	MPC · JPL
890111	2013 HO_{52}	—	April 16, 2013	Cerro Tololo-DECam	DECam	·	1.6 km	MPC · JPL
890112	2013 HA_{60}	—	October 24, 2011	Haleakala	Pan-STARRS 1	·	720 m	MPC · JPL
890113	2013 HL_{65}	—	April 16, 2013	Cerro Tololo-DECam	DECam	·	960 m	MPC · JPL
890114	2013 HY_{71}	—	September 2, 2010	Mount Lemmon	Mount Lemmon Survey	·	1.4 km	MPC · JPL
890115	2013 HF_{81}	—	April 12, 2004	Palomar	NEAT	·	1.1 km	MPC · JPL
890116	2013 HM_{94}	—	April 2, 2013	Mount Lemmon	Mount Lemmon Survey	·	410 m	MPC · JPL
890117	2013 HV_{94}	—	October 1, 2011	Mount Lemmon	Mount Lemmon Survey	·	1.1 km	MPC · JPL
890118	2013 HQ_{102}	—	March 13, 2003	Kitt Peak	Spacewatch	·	350 m	MPC · JPL
890119	2013 HO_{114}	—	April 16, 2013	Cerro Tololo-DECam	DECam	·	1.5 km	MPC · JPL
890120	2013 HW_{119}	—	April 16, 2013	Cerro Tololo-DECam	DECam	·	920 m	MPC · JPL
890121	2013 HJ_{121}	—	April 10, 2013	Haleakala	Pan-STARRS 1	AEO	700 m	MPC · JPL
890122	2013 HH_{137}	—	April 10, 2013	Haleakala	Pan-STARRS 1	·	1.1 km	MPC · JPL
890123	2013 HM_{147}	—	April 16, 2013	Cerro Tololo-DECam	DECam	·	760 m	MPC · JPL
890124	2013 HC_{155}	—	April 9, 2013	Haleakala	Pan-STARRS 1	·	460 m	MPC · JPL
890125	2013 HA_{156}	—	July 3, 2014	Haleakala	Pan-STARRS 1	THM	1.2 km	MPC · JPL
890126	2013 HN_{162}	—	April 19, 2013	Haleakala	Pan-STARRS 1	·	1.1 km	MPC · JPL
890127	2013 HT_{163}	—	April 20, 2013	Mount Lemmon	Mount Lemmon Survey	H	350 m	MPC · JPL
890128	2013 HX_{164}	—	April 19, 2013	Haleakala	Pan-STARRS 1	·	1.2 km	MPC · JPL
890129	2013 HA_{165}	—	April 19, 2013	Haleakala	Pan-STARRS 1	H	340 m	MPC · JPL
890130	2013 JM_{7}	—	May 5, 2013	Haleakala	Pan-STARRS 1	APO · PHA	250 m	MPC · JPL
890131	2013 JL_{26}	—	April 13, 2013	Kitt Peak	Spacewatch	·	1.1 km	MPC · JPL
890132	2013 JJ_{32}	—	May 12, 2013	Mount Lemmon	Mount Lemmon Survey	·	2.4 km	MPC · JPL
890133	2013 JA_{39}	—	May 11, 2013	Mount Lemmon	Mount Lemmon Survey	·	1.2 km	MPC · JPL
890134	2013 JT_{53}	—	April 11, 2013	iTelescope	Falla, N.	·	1.6 km	MPC · JPL
890135	2013 JA_{54}	—	April 19, 2013	Haleakala	Pan-STARRS 1	·	860 m	MPC · JPL
890136	2013 JK_{68}	—	May 3, 2013	Mount Lemmon	Mount Lemmon Survey	·	1.1 km	MPC · JPL
890137	2013 JB_{70}	—	May 12, 2013	Kitt Peak	Spacewatch	·	1.3 km	MPC · JPL
890138	2013 JN_{80}	—	May 8, 2013	Haleakala	Pan-STARRS 1	VER	1.9 km	MPC · JPL
890139	2013 JX_{81}	—	May 15, 2013	Haleakala	Pan-STARRS 1	·	1.5 km	MPC · JPL
890140	2013 KW_{2}	—	April 7, 2013	Mount Lemmon	Mount Lemmon Survey	·	1.4 km	MPC · JPL
890141	2013 KA_{20}	—	May 16, 2013	Haleakala	Pan-STARRS 1	·	1.4 km	MPC · JPL
890142	2013 KS_{21}	—	May 21, 2013	Mount Lemmon	Mount Lemmon Survey	TIR	1.9 km	MPC · JPL
890143	2013 KL_{22}	—	May 16, 2013	Haleakala	Pan-STARRS 1	JUN	770 m	MPC · JPL
890144	2013 LW_{18}	—	June 5, 2013	Mount Lemmon	Mount Lemmon Survey	H	370 m	MPC · JPL
890145	2013 LL_{32}	—	June 14, 2013	Kitt Peak	Spacewatch	H	410 m	MPC · JPL
890146	2013 LY_{41}	—	June 1, 2013	Haleakala	Pan-STARRS 1	·	450 m	MPC · JPL
890147	2013 LG_{46}	—	June 1, 2013	Mount Lemmon	Mount Lemmon Survey	·	490 m	MPC · JPL
890148	2013 MU	—	June 17, 2013	Haleakala	Pan-STARRS 1	H	370 m	MPC · JPL
890149	2013 MR_{3}	—	May 31, 2013	Haleakala	Pan-STARRS 1	·	1.3 km	MPC · JPL
890150	2013 MD_{15}	—	June 30, 2013	Haleakala	Pan-STARRS 1	·	660 m	MPC · JPL
890151	2013 MK_{16}	—	June 18, 2013	Haleakala	Pan-STARRS 1	DOR	1.8 km	MPC · JPL
890152	2013 MX_{18}	—	June 18, 2013	Haleakala	Pan-STARRS 1	·	490 m	MPC · JPL
890153	2013 NY_{20}	—	July 1, 2013	Haleakala	Pan-STARRS 1	·	730 m	MPC · JPL
890154	2013 NY_{23}	—	July 13, 2013	Haleakala	Pan-STARRS 1	PHO	670 m	MPC · JPL
890155	2013 NS_{31}	—	July 15, 2013	Haleakala	Pan-STARRS 1	·	1.7 km	MPC · JPL
890156	2013 NC_{39}	—	July 4, 2013	Haleakala	Pan-STARRS 1	·	1.0 km	MPC · JPL
890157	2013 NV_{42}	—	July 15, 2013	Haleakala	Pan-STARRS 1	·	720 m	MPC · JPL
890158	2013 NO_{45}	—	July 15, 2013	Haleakala	Pan-STARRS 1	·	700 m	MPC · JPL
890159	2013 NM_{62}	—	July 13, 2013	Haleakala	Pan-STARRS 1	·	740 m	MPC · JPL
890160	2013 NQ_{63}	—	July 15, 2013	Haleakala	Pan-STARRS 1	·	570 m	MPC · JPL
890161	2013 NW_{66}	—	July 15, 2013	Haleakala	Pan-STARRS 1	EOS	1.1 km	MPC · JPL
890162	2013 NJ_{82}	—	July 15, 2013	Haleakala	Pan-STARRS 1	·	800 m	MPC · JPL
890163	2013 OS_{1}	—	July 17, 2013	Haleakala	Pan-STARRS 1	·	2.2 km	MPC · JPL
890164	2013 OT_{5}	—	July 2, 2013	Haleakala	Pan-STARRS 1	·	1.5 km	MPC · JPL
890165	2013 OP_{14}	—	December 11, 2014	Mount Lemmon	Mount Lemmon Survey	TIR	1.8 km	MPC · JPL
890166	2013 PD_{25}	—	August 9, 2013	Palomar	Palomar Transient Factory	PHO	880 m	MPC · JPL
890167	2013 PM_{34}	—	August 9, 2013	Kitt Peak	Spacewatch	V	390 m	MPC · JPL
890168	2013 PL_{39}	—	February 28, 2009	Mount Lemmon	Mount Lemmon Survey	·	550 m	MPC · JPL
890169	2013 PK_{51}	—	August 13, 2013	Kitt Peak	Spacewatch	THB	1.5 km	MPC · JPL
890170	2013 PR_{56}	—	August 10, 2013	Palomar	Palomar Transient Factory	·	940 m	MPC · JPL
890171	2013 PF_{67}	—	August 15, 2013	Haleakala	Pan-STARRS 1	AMO	330 m	MPC · JPL
890172	2013 PE_{75}	—	August 13, 2013	Kitt Peak	Spacewatch	3:2	3.9 km	MPC · JPL
890173	2013 PN_{75}	—	August 12, 2013	Haleakala	Pan-STARRS 1	H	380 m	MPC · JPL
890174	2013 PV_{85}	—	August 15, 2013	Haleakala	Pan-STARRS 1	PHO	600 m	MPC · JPL
890175	2013 PM_{86}	—	August 9, 2013	Haleakala	Pan-STARRS 1	·	790 m	MPC · JPL
890176	2013 PS_{87}	—	August 14, 2013	Haleakala	Pan-STARRS 1	·	550 m	MPC · JPL
890177	2013 PV_{88}	—	August 4, 2013	Haleakala	Pan-STARRS 1	MAR	480 m	MPC · JPL
890178	2013 PY_{95}	—	August 4, 2013	Haleakala	Pan-STARRS 1	·	720 m	MPC · JPL
890179	2013 PR_{96}	—	August 15, 2013	Haleakala	Pan-STARRS 1	·	1.7 km	MPC · JPL
890180	2013 PZ_{96}	—	August 9, 2013	Haleakala	Pan-STARRS 1	·	680 m	MPC · JPL
890181	2013 PK_{99}	—	August 14, 2013	Haleakala	Pan-STARRS 1	LIX	2.0 km	MPC · JPL
890182	2013 PF_{100}	—	August 12, 2013	Haleakala	Pan-STARRS 1	EOS	1.1 km	MPC · JPL
890183	2013 PD_{105}	—	August 15, 2013	Haleakala	Pan-STARRS 1	·	600 m	MPC · JPL
890184	2013 PQ_{107}	—	August 15, 2013	Haleakala	Pan-STARRS 1	·	560 m	MPC · JPL
890185	2013 PK_{109}	—	August 14, 2013	Haleakala	Pan-STARRS 1	·	510 m	MPC · JPL
890186	2013 PD_{118}	—	August 15, 2013	Haleakala	Pan-STARRS 1	·	480 m	MPC · JPL
890187	2013 PX_{118}	—	August 14, 2013	Haleakala	Pan-STARRS 1	·	790 m	MPC · JPL
890188	2013 PV_{119}	—	August 4, 2013	Haleakala	Pan-STARRS 1	·	720 m	MPC · JPL
890189	2013 PB_{121}	—	August 12, 2013	Haleakala	Pan-STARRS 1	·	540 m	MPC · JPL
890190	2013 PH_{121}	—	August 15, 2013	Haleakala	Pan-STARRS 1	·	620 m	MPC · JPL
890191	2013 PR_{121}	—	August 4, 2013	Haleakala	Pan-STARRS 1	·	540 m	MPC · JPL
890192	2013 PN_{133}	—	August 12, 2013	Haleakala	Pan-STARRS 1	MAR	700 m	MPC · JPL
890193	2013 PA_{145}	—	August 12, 2013	Haleakala	Pan-STARRS 1	·	1.8 km	MPC · JPL
890194	2013 QE_{2}	—	August 16, 2013	Haleakala	Pan-STARRS 1	·	850 m	MPC · JPL
890195	2013 QU_{4}	—	August 12, 2013	Kitt Peak	Spacewatch	·	520 m	MPC · JPL
890196	2013 QR_{6}	—	August 24, 2013	Haleakala	Pan-STARRS 1	H	420 m	MPC · JPL
890197	2013 QX_{23}	—	August 26, 2013	Haleakala	Pan-STARRS 1	·	2.3 km	MPC · JPL
890198	2013 QG_{41}	—	August 12, 2013	Haleakala	Pan-STARRS 1	·	790 m	MPC · JPL
890199	2013 QA_{52}	—	August 30, 2013	Haleakala	Pan-STARRS 1	·	690 m	MPC · JPL
890200	2013 QX_{52}	—	August 29, 2013	Haleakala	Pan-STARRS 1	H	330 m	MPC · JPL

== 890201–890300 ==
back to top

Designation			Discovery			Properties		Ref
Permanent	Provisional	Named after	Date	Site	Discoverer(s)	Category	Diam.	Ref
890201	2013 QC_{77}	—	August 12, 2013	Haleakala	Pan-STARRS 1	·	1.0 km	MPC · JPL
890202	2013 QJ_{88}	—	August 26, 2013	Haleakala	Pan-STARRS 1	·	1.6 km	MPC · JPL
890203	2013 QT_{89}	—	August 9, 2013	Kitt Peak	Spacewatch	V	460 m	MPC · JPL
890204	2013 QM_{91}	—	August 4, 2013	Haleakala	Pan-STARRS 1	·	760 m	MPC · JPL
890205	2013 QE_{98}	—	August 18, 2013	Haleakala	Pan-STARRS 1	·	1.8 km	MPC · JPL
890206	2013 QK_{99}	—	October 4, 2014	Mount Lemmon	Mount Lemmon Survey	·	1.8 km	MPC · JPL
890207	2013 QG_{100}	—	October 25, 2001	Apache Point	SDSS	·	660 m	MPC · JPL
890208	2013 QM_{102}	—	August 30, 2013	Mauna Kea	Mauna Kea	·	2.0 km	MPC · JPL
890209	2013 QQ_{102}	—	August 31, 2013	Haleakala	Pan-STARRS 1	·	680 m	MPC · JPL
890210	2013 QS_{103}	—	August 28, 2013	Mount Lemmon	Mount Lemmon Survey	·	450 m	MPC · JPL
890211	2013 QL_{107}	—	August 26, 2013	Haleakala	Pan-STARRS 1	·	580 m	MPC · JPL
890212	2013 RY_{25}	—	September 2, 2013	Tincana	Zolnowski, M., Kusiak, M.	·	830 m	MPC · JPL
890213	2013 RZ_{34}	—	August 12, 2013	Haleakala	Pan-STARRS 1	·	580 m	MPC · JPL
890214	2013 RP_{40}	—	September 5, 2013	Kitt Peak	Spacewatch	·	790 m	MPC · JPL
890215	2013 RK_{42}	—	September 28, 2009	Mount Lemmon	Mount Lemmon Survey	·	730 m	MPC · JPL
890216	2013 RE_{43}	—	September 9, 2013	Haleakala	Pan-STARRS 1	AMO	280 m	MPC · JPL
890217	2013 RQ_{62}	—	September 3, 2013	Haleakala	Pan-STARRS 1	·	690 m	MPC · JPL
890218	2013 RU_{62}	—	August 27, 2006	Kitt Peak	Spacewatch	·	540 m	MPC · JPL
890219	2013 RE_{63}	—	September 3, 2013	Haleakala	Pan-STARRS 1	·	830 m	MPC · JPL
890220	2013 RG_{66}	—	August 15, 2013	Haleakala	Pan-STARRS 1	·	1.4 km	MPC · JPL
890221	2013 RP_{77}	—	September 3, 2013	Mount Lemmon	Mount Lemmon Survey	·	690 m	MPC · JPL
890222	2013 RC_{83}	—	September 13, 2013	Kitt Peak	Spacewatch	·	640 m	MPC · JPL
890223	2013 RY_{85}	—	September 13, 2013	Kitt Peak	Spacewatch	·	940 m	MPC · JPL
890224	2013 RF_{93}	—	September 1, 2013	Mount Lemmon	Mount Lemmon Survey	·	720 m	MPC · JPL
890225	2013 RN_{106}	—	September 14, 2013	Kitt Peak	Spacewatch	·	750 m	MPC · JPL
890226	2013 RK_{110}	—	January 23, 2015	Haleakala	Pan-STARRS 1	PHO	770 m	MPC · JPL
890227	2013 RU_{111}	—	September 14, 2013	Haleakala	Pan-STARRS 1	·	770 m	MPC · JPL
890228	2013 RM_{113}	—	September 1, 2013	Mount Lemmon	Mount Lemmon Survey	(5)	500 m	MPC · JPL
890229	2013 RR_{114}	—	September 2, 2013	Mount Lemmon	Mount Lemmon Survey	·	800 m	MPC · JPL
890230	2013 RA_{116}	—	September 15, 2013	Mount Lemmon	Mount Lemmon Survey	·	2.0 km	MPC · JPL
890231	2013 RR_{121}	—	September 3, 2013	Mount Lemmon	Mount Lemmon Survey	·	720 m	MPC · JPL
890232	2013 RD_{125}	—	February 16, 2015	Haleakala	Pan-STARRS 1	(5)	720 m	MPC · JPL
890233	2013 RH_{126}	—	September 15, 2013	Kitt Peak	Spacewatch	·	1.5 km	MPC · JPL
890234	2013 RD_{133}	—	September 2, 2013	Mount Lemmon	Mount Lemmon Survey	·	910 m	MPC · JPL
890235	2013 RQ_{133}	—	September 2, 2013	Mount Lemmon	Mount Lemmon Survey	·	490 m	MPC · JPL
890236	2013 RE_{134}	—	September 14, 2013	Haleakala	Pan-STARRS 1	·	1.5 km	MPC · JPL
890237	2013 RP_{135}	—	September 15, 2013	Mount Lemmon	Mount Lemmon Survey	TIR	1.5 km	MPC · JPL
890238	2013 RR_{137}	—	September 10, 2013	Haleakala	Pan-STARRS 1	·	900 m	MPC · JPL
890239	2013 RZ_{143}	—	September 1, 2013	Haleakala	Pan-STARRS 1	VER	1.8 km	MPC · JPL
890240	2013 RF_{148}	—	September 13, 2013	Kitt Peak	Spacewatch	·	2.4 km	MPC · JPL
890241	2013 RN_{148}	—	September 3, 2013	Haleakala	Pan-STARRS 1	·	1.5 km	MPC · JPL
890242	2013 RO_{148}	—	September 6, 2013	Mount Lemmon	Mount Lemmon Survey	·	1.7 km	MPC · JPL
890243	2013 RP_{148}	—	September 1, 2013	Haleakala	Pan-STARRS 1	·	1.6 km	MPC · JPL
890244	2013 RU_{152}	—	September 9, 2013	Haleakala	Pan-STARRS 1	MAS	530 m	MPC · JPL
890245	2013 RT_{154}	—	September 14, 2013	Haleakala	Pan-STARRS 1	·	680 m	MPC · JPL
890246	2013 RU_{154}	—	September 30, 2005	Mount Lemmon	Mount Lemmon Survey	·	490 m	MPC · JPL
890247	2013 RF_{155}	—	September 10, 2013	Haleakala	Pan-STARRS 1	·	490 m	MPC · JPL
890248	2013 RU_{159}	—	September 2, 2013	Mount Lemmon	Mount Lemmon Survey	·	560 m	MPC · JPL
890249	2013 RM_{160}	—	September 15, 2013	Haleakala	Pan-STARRS 1	·	420 m	MPC · JPL
890250	2013 RA_{162}	—	September 28, 2009	Mount Lemmon	Mount Lemmon Survey	·	540 m	MPC · JPL
890251	2013 RG_{165}	—	September 9, 2013	Haleakala	Pan-STARRS 1	·	1.7 km	MPC · JPL
890252	2013 RB_{195}	—	September 14, 2013	Haleakala	Pan-STARRS 1	·	1.7 km	MPC · JPL
890253	2013 SD_{5}	—	September 17, 2013	Mount Lemmon	Mount Lemmon Survey	·	2.0 km	MPC · JPL
890254	2013 SE_{17}	—	February 13, 2011	Mount Lemmon	Mount Lemmon Survey	·	680 m	MPC · JPL
890255	2013 SM_{25}	—	September 9, 2013	Haleakala	Pan-STARRS 1	·	720 m	MPC · JPL
890256	2013 SC_{29}	—	January 28, 2011	Mount Lemmon	Mount Lemmon Survey	·	1.1 km	MPC · JPL
890257	2013 SL_{34}	—	September 2, 2013	Mount Lemmon	Mount Lemmon Survey	MAS	630 m	MPC · JPL
890258	2013 SM_{42}	—	September 14, 2013	Haleakala	Pan-STARRS 1	H	420 m	MPC · JPL
890259	2013 SG_{49}	—	September 28, 2013	Mount Lemmon	Mount Lemmon Survey	·	850 m	MPC · JPL
890260	2013 SY_{65}	—	September 9, 2013	Haleakala	Pan-STARRS 1	·	880 m	MPC · JPL
890261	2013 SN_{70}	—	September 9, 2013	Haleakala	Pan-STARRS 1	T_{j} (2.99)	1.9 km	MPC · JPL
890262	2013 SG_{93}	—	January 27, 2015	Haleakala	Pan-STARRS 1	·	1.6 km	MPC · JPL
890263	2013 SS_{101}	—	September 25, 2013	Mount Lemmon	Mount Lemmon Survey	·	1.6 km	MPC · JPL
890264	2013 SH_{103}	—	September 13, 2013	Mount Lemmon	Mount Lemmon Survey	(5)	800 m	MPC · JPL
890265	2013 SY_{103}	—	September 17, 2013	Mount Lemmon	Mount Lemmon Survey	·	1.8 km	MPC · JPL
890266	2013 SF_{104}	—	September 28, 2013	Mount Lemmon	Mount Lemmon Survey	·	830 m	MPC · JPL
890267	2013 SO_{105}	—	March 13, 2016	Haleakala	Pan-STARRS 1	·	1.9 km	MPC · JPL
890268	2013 SU_{106}	—	September 14, 2013	Mount Lemmon	Mount Lemmon Survey	·	1.9 km	MPC · JPL
890269	2013 SX_{107}	—	September 26, 2013	Mount Lemmon	Mount Lemmon Survey	PHO	630 m	MPC · JPL
890270	2013 SX_{108}	—	September 16, 2013	Mount Lemmon	Mount Lemmon Survey	EOS	1.2 km	MPC · JPL
890271	2013 SN_{109}	—	September 28, 2013	Mount Lemmon	Mount Lemmon Survey	LIX	2.0 km	MPC · JPL
890272	2013 SO_{110}	—	September 24, 2013	Mount Lemmon	Mount Lemmon Survey	·	1.9 km	MPC · JPL
890273	2013 TU_{36}	—	October 1, 2013	Mount Lemmon	Mount Lemmon Survey	·	860 m	MPC · JPL
890274	2013 TV_{37}	—	October 2, 2013	Mount Lemmon	Mount Lemmon Survey	·	1.9 km	MPC · JPL
890275	2013 TX_{60}	—	October 4, 2013	Mount Lemmon	Mount Lemmon Survey	·	1.6 km	MPC · JPL
890276	2013 TD_{85}	—	October 23, 2008	Kitt Peak	Spacewatch	EOS	1.2 km	MPC · JPL
890277	2013 TO_{99}	—	October 2, 2013	Kitt Peak	Spacewatch	T_{j} (2.98)	2.2 km	MPC · JPL
890278	2013 TF_{106}	—	October 3, 2013	Mount Lemmon	Mount Lemmon Survey	HYG	1.7 km	MPC · JPL
890279	2013 TC_{108}	—	October 4, 2004	Kitt Peak	Spacewatch	·	1.1 km	MPC · JPL
890280	2013 TY_{115}	—	October 4, 2013	Mount Lemmon	Mount Lemmon Survey	·	1.4 km	MPC · JPL
890281	2013 TG_{132}	—	September 25, 2013	Catalina	CSS	NYS	960 m	MPC · JPL
890282	2013 TK_{154}	—	October 5, 2013	Kitt Peak	Research and Education Collaborative Occultation Network	·	1.9 km	MPC · JPL
890283	2013 TM_{171}	—	October 3, 2013	Haleakala	Pan-STARRS 1	·	1.0 km	MPC · JPL
890284	2013 TN_{173}	—	October 3, 2013	Haleakala	Pan-STARRS 1	·	710 m	MPC · JPL
890285	2013 TN_{174}	—	November 25, 2009	Kitt Peak	Spacewatch	·	630 m	MPC · JPL
890286	2013 TJ_{175}	—	October 14, 2013	Kitt Peak	Spacewatch	·	960 m	MPC · JPL
890287	2013 TC_{176}	—	October 12, 2013	Kitt Peak	Spacewatch	·	660 m	MPC · JPL
890288	2013 TN_{178}	—	October 12, 2013	Mount Lemmon	Mount Lemmon Survey	(5)	740 m	MPC · JPL
890289	2013 TP_{183}	—	October 3, 2013	Haleakala	Pan-STARRS 1	TEL	1.0 km	MPC · JPL
890290	2013 TV_{184}	—	September 26, 2013	Mount Lemmon	Mount Lemmon Survey	·	2.4 km	MPC · JPL
890291	2013 TR_{185}	—	October 6, 2013	Kitt Peak	Spacewatch	NYS	820 m	MPC · JPL
890292	2013 TY_{185}	—	October 2, 2013	Haleakala	Pan-STARRS 1	EOS	1.4 km	MPC · JPL
890293	2013 TP_{191}	—	October 12, 2013	Mount Lemmon	Mount Lemmon Survey	·	2.1 km	MPC · JPL
890294	2013 TT_{191}	—	October 3, 2013	Haleakala	Pan-STARRS 1	·	1.7 km	MPC · JPL
890295	2013 TX_{191}	—	October 3, 2013	Mount Lemmon	Mount Lemmon Survey	·	1.7 km	MPC · JPL
890296	2013 TF_{193}	—	October 1, 2013	Kitt Peak	Spacewatch	·	1.8 km	MPC · JPL
890297	2013 TK_{195}	—	October 9, 2013	Mount Lemmon	Mount Lemmon Survey	·	1.9 km	MPC · JPL
890298	2013 TP_{198}	—	October 2, 2013	Mount Lemmon	Mount Lemmon Survey	·	1.6 km	MPC · JPL
890299	2013 TU_{201}	—	October 13, 2013	Kitt Peak	Spacewatch	·	1.7 km	MPC · JPL
890300	2013 TM_{203}	—	October 3, 2013	Haleakala	Pan-STARRS 1	V	410 m	MPC · JPL

== 890301–890400 ==
back to top

Designation			Discovery			Properties		Ref
Permanent	Provisional	Named after	Date	Site	Discoverer(s)	Category	Diam.	Ref
890301	2013 TJ_{209}	—	October 3, 2013	Haleakala	Pan-STARRS 1	·	1.8 km	MPC · JPL
890302	2013 TC_{212}	—	October 2, 2013	Mount Lemmon	Mount Lemmon Survey	T_{j} (2.99)	1.9 km	MPC · JPL
890303	2013 TE_{213}	—	October 2, 2013	Haleakala	Pan-STARRS 1	V	480 m	MPC · JPL
890304	2013 TM_{214}	—	February 25, 2007	Kitt Peak	Spacewatch	·	780 m	MPC · JPL
890305	2013 TP_{216}	—	October 3, 2013	Haleakala	Pan-STARRS 1	THB	2.1 km	MPC · JPL
890306	2013 TK_{220}	—	October 3, 2013	Mount Lemmon	Mount Lemmon Survey	·	1.8 km	MPC · JPL
890307	2013 TP_{223}	—	October 3, 2013	Haleakala	Pan-STARRS 1	THM	1.4 km	MPC · JPL
890308	2013 TE_{227}	—	October 14, 2013	Kitt Peak	Spacewatch	·	1.1 km	MPC · JPL
890309	2013 TG_{235}	—	October 2, 2013	Haleakala	Pan-STARRS 1	·	1.6 km	MPC · JPL
890310	2013 TA_{236}	—	October 12, 2013	Kitt Peak	Spacewatch	VER	1.8 km	MPC · JPL
890311	2013 TW_{236}	—	October 5, 2013	Haleakala	Pan-STARRS 1	NYS	640 m	MPC · JPL
890312	2013 TJ_{246}	—	October 5, 2013	Mount Lemmon	Mount Lemmon Survey	·	1.9 km	MPC · JPL
890313	2013 TO_{253}	—	October 5, 2013	Haleakala	Pan-STARRS 1	·	800 m	MPC · JPL
890314	2013 TE_{254}	—	October 2, 2013	Kitt Peak	Spacewatch	T_{j} (2.97)	2.0 km	MPC · JPL
890315	2013 TZ_{280}	—	October 2, 2013	Mount Lemmon	Mount Lemmon Survey	·	1.7 km	MPC · JPL
890316	2013 TQ_{282}	—	October 5, 2013	Haleakala	Pan-STARRS 1	·	1.7 km	MPC · JPL
890317	2013 UO_{20}	—	December 14, 2010	Mount Lemmon	Mount Lemmon Survey	·	500 m	MPC · JPL
890318	2013 UM_{23}	—	October 21, 2013	Haleakala	Pan-STARRS 1	PHO	750 m	MPC · JPL
890319	2013 UK_{26}	—	October 28, 2013	Mount Lemmon	Mount Lemmon Survey	·	730 m	MPC · JPL
890320	2013 UR_{26}	—	October 24, 2013	Mount Lemmon	Mount Lemmon Survey	(5)	760 m	MPC · JPL
890321	2013 UR_{32}	—	October 24, 2013	Mount Lemmon	Mount Lemmon Survey	·	1.8 km	MPC · JPL
890322	2013 UV_{32}	—	October 23, 2013	Mount Lemmon	Mount Lemmon Survey	THB	1.6 km	MPC · JPL
890323	2013 UR_{35}	—	September 16, 2013	Mount Lemmon	Mount Lemmon Survey	·	1.9 km	MPC · JPL
890324	2013 UU_{35}	—	October 25, 2013	Mount Lemmon	Mount Lemmon Survey	·	2.1 km	MPC · JPL
890325	2013 UN_{41}	—	October 25, 2013	Mount Lemmon	Mount Lemmon Survey	·	2.4 km	MPC · JPL
890326	2013 UP_{43}	—	October 24, 2013	Mount Lemmon	Mount Lemmon Survey	TIR	1.8 km	MPC · JPL
890327	2013 UU_{44}	—	October 26, 2013	Mount Lemmon	Mount Lemmon Survey	·	1.9 km	MPC · JPL
890328	2013 UW_{44}	—	October 31, 2013	Mount Lemmon	Mount Lemmon Survey	EOS	1.4 km	MPC · JPL
890329	2013 UO_{45}	—	October 25, 2013	Mount Lemmon	Mount Lemmon Survey	·	1.9 km	MPC · JPL
890330	2013 UP_{49}	—	October 25, 2013	Mount Lemmon	Mount Lemmon Survey	·	740 m	MPC · JPL
890331	2013 UG_{51}	—	October 24, 2013	Mount Lemmon	Mount Lemmon Survey	·	1.8 km	MPC · JPL
890332	2013 UO_{51}	—	October 23, 2013	Haleakala	Pan-STARRS 1	·	800 m	MPC · JPL
890333	2013 US_{51}	—	October 24, 2013	Mount Lemmon	Mount Lemmon Survey	·	830 m	MPC · JPL
890334	2013 UX_{52}	—	October 24, 2013	Mount Lemmon	Mount Lemmon Survey	·	1.9 km	MPC · JPL
890335	2013 UG_{56}	—	October 26, 2013	Mount Lemmon	Mount Lemmon Survey	WIT	630 m	MPC · JPL
890336	2013 UV_{57}	—	October 24, 2013	Mount Lemmon	Mount Lemmon Survey	EOS	1.3 km	MPC · JPL
890337	2013 UU_{63}	—	October 23, 2013	Haleakala	Pan-STARRS 1	·	1.9 km	MPC · JPL
890338	2013 UA_{64}	—	October 25, 2013	Mount Lemmon	Mount Lemmon Survey	·	2.1 km	MPC · JPL
890339	2013 UE_{64}	—	October 28, 2013	Mount Lemmon	Mount Lemmon Survey	·	2.1 km	MPC · JPL
890340	2013 UE_{65}	—	October 30, 2013	Haleakala	Pan-STARRS 1	·	2.0 km	MPC · JPL
890341	2013 VV_{8}	—	September 17, 2009	Mount Lemmon	Mount Lemmon Survey	·	900 m	MPC · JPL
890342	2013 VU_{22}	—	September 30, 2013	Mount Lemmon	Mount Lemmon Survey	·	1.9 km	MPC · JPL
890343	2013 VU_{31}	—	November 9, 2013	Mount Lemmon	Mount Lemmon Survey	THM	1.6 km	MPC · JPL
890344	2013 VU_{33}	—	November 4, 2013	Mount Lemmon	Mount Lemmon Survey	·	810 m	MPC · JPL
890345	2013 VB_{34}	—	November 9, 2013	Haleakala	Pan-STARRS 1	(5)	810 m	MPC · JPL
890346	2013 VU_{35}	—	November 11, 2013	Mount Lemmon	Mount Lemmon Survey	·	740 m	MPC · JPL
890347	2013 VH_{36}	—	November 11, 2013	Mount Lemmon	Mount Lemmon Survey	·	610 m	MPC · JPL
890348	2013 VK_{36}	—	November 6, 2013	Haleakala	Pan-STARRS 1	·	560 m	MPC · JPL
890349	2013 VO_{38}	—	November 9, 2013	Mount Lemmon	Mount Lemmon Survey	·	1.0 km	MPC · JPL
890350	2013 VP_{38}	—	November 6, 2013	Catalina	CSS	NYS	940 m	MPC · JPL
890351	2013 VN_{47}	—	November 1, 2013	Mount Lemmon	Mount Lemmon Survey	·	2.4 km	MPC · JPL
890352	2013 VS_{48}	—	November 10, 2013	Kitt Peak	Spacewatch	LIX	2.2 km	MPC · JPL
890353	2013 VF_{50}	—	November 4, 2013	Mount Lemmon	Mount Lemmon Survey	(5)	680 m	MPC · JPL
890354	2013 VB_{51}	—	November 11, 2013	Mount Lemmon	Mount Lemmon Survey	·	1.8 km	MPC · JPL
890355	2013 VP_{52}	—	November 10, 2013	Kitt Peak	Spacewatch	·	2.3 km	MPC · JPL
890356	2013 VK_{53}	—	November 10, 2013	Ouka{\"\i}meden	C. Rinner	·	1.3 km	MPC · JPL
890357	2013 VX_{53}	—	November 8, 2013	Kitt Peak	Spacewatch	·	550 m	MPC · JPL
890358	2013 VK_{54}	—	November 9, 2013	Haleakala	Pan-STARRS 1	·	2.2 km	MPC · JPL
890359	2013 VA_{55}	—	November 9, 2013	Haleakala	Pan-STARRS 1	T_{j} (2.99) · (895)	2.3 km	MPC · JPL
890360	2013 VH_{55}	—	November 9, 2013	Haleakala	Pan-STARRS 1	·	1.0 km	MPC · JPL
890361	2013 VM_{58}	—	November 9, 2013	Mount Lemmon	Mount Lemmon Survey	EOS	1.2 km	MPC · JPL
890362	2013 VA_{60}	—	November 1, 2013	Kitt Peak	Spacewatch	·	1.8 km	MPC · JPL
890363	2013 VZ_{64}	—	November 9, 2013	Mount Lemmon	Mount Lemmon Survey	·	2.0 km	MPC · JPL
890364	2013 VK_{65}	—	November 9, 2013	Mount Lemmon	Mount Lemmon Survey	·	2.0 km	MPC · JPL
890365	2013 VS_{65}	—	November 2, 2013	Mount Lemmon	Mount Lemmon Survey	·	2.0 km	MPC · JPL
890366	2013 VC_{66}	—	November 9, 2013	Kitt Peak	Spacewatch	TIR	1.8 km	MPC · JPL
890367	2013 VU_{66}	—	November 1, 2013	Mount Lemmon	Mount Lemmon Survey	·	890 m	MPC · JPL
890368	2013 VD_{67}	—	November 4, 2013	Mount Lemmon	Mount Lemmon Survey	EOS	1.2 km	MPC · JPL
890369	2013 VK_{68}	—	November 2, 2013	Mount Lemmon	Mount Lemmon Survey	·	1.9 km	MPC · JPL
890370	2013 VX_{70}	—	November 9, 2013	Kitt Peak	Spacewatch	·	790 m	MPC · JPL
890371	2013 VC_{76}	—	November 9, 2013	Kitt Peak	Spacewatch	PHO	620 m	MPC · JPL
890372	2013 VT_{76}	—	November 10, 2013	Mount Lemmon	Mount Lemmon Survey	·	1.8 km	MPC · JPL
890373	2013 VH_{89}	—	November 8, 2013	Mount Lemmon	Mount Lemmon Survey	·	1.8 km	MPC · JPL
890374	2013 VA_{94}	—	November 9, 2013	Mount Lemmon	Mount Lemmon Survey	·	1.9 km	MPC · JPL
890375	2013 VC_{97}	—	November 4, 2013	Haleakala	Pan-STARRS 1	·	2.1 km	MPC · JPL
890376	2013 WT_{7}	—	May 28, 2012	Mount Lemmon	Mount Lemmon Survey	EUN	920 m	MPC · JPL
890377	2013 WD_{16}	—	November 27, 2013	Haleakala	Pan-STARRS 1	·	620 m	MPC · JPL
890378	2013 WF_{20}	—	November 27, 2013	Haleakala	Pan-STARRS 1	·	910 m	MPC · JPL
890379	2013 WW_{22}	—	November 26, 2013	XuYi	PMO NEO Survey Program	PHO	560 m	MPC · JPL
890380	2013 WO_{29}	—	November 26, 2013	Mount Lemmon	Mount Lemmon Survey	·	2.2 km	MPC · JPL
890381	2013 WH_{34}	—	November 26, 2013	Haleakala	Pan-STARRS 1	·	2.3 km	MPC · JPL
890382	2013 WH_{54}	—	November 25, 2013	Haleakala	Pan-STARRS 1	·	830 m	MPC · JPL
890383	2013 WS_{89}	—	October 9, 2013	Mount Lemmon	Mount Lemmon Survey	·	2.2 km	MPC · JPL
890384	2013 WQ_{93}	—	November 28, 2013	Mount Lemmon	Mount Lemmon Survey	·	2.4 km	MPC · JPL
890385	2013 WX_{94}	—	November 28, 2013	Mount Lemmon	Mount Lemmon Survey	·	2.2 km	MPC · JPL
890386	2013 WV_{95}	—	January 11, 2008	Kitt Peak	Spacewatch	·	520 m	MPC · JPL
890387	2013 WH_{101}	—	November 29, 2013	Mount Lemmon	Mount Lemmon Survey	·	920 m	MPC · JPL
890388	2013 WS_{102}	—	November 29, 2013	Mount Lemmon	Mount Lemmon Survey	·	1.1 km	MPC · JPL
890389	2013 WA_{105}	—	November 28, 2013	Kitt Peak	Spacewatch	·	1.6 km	MPC · JPL
890390	2013 WN_{112}	—	November 28, 2013	Mount Lemmon	Mount Lemmon Survey	·	1.8 km	MPC · JPL
890391	2013 WF_{115}	—	November 28, 2013	Mount Lemmon	Mount Lemmon Survey	·	1.0 km	MPC · JPL
890392	2013 WD_{117}	—	October 25, 2013	Kitt Peak	Spacewatch	·	600 m	MPC · JPL
890393	2013 WO_{119}	—	November 27, 2013	Haleakala	Pan-STARRS 1	·	900 m	MPC · JPL
890394	2013 WZ_{119}	—	November 29, 2013	Mount Lemmon	Mount Lemmon Survey	·	2.3 km	MPC · JPL
890395	2013 WA_{124}	—	April 3, 2016	Haleakala	Pan-STARRS 1	EOS	1.5 km	MPC · JPL
890396	2013 WA_{125}	—	November 28, 2013	Mount Lemmon	Mount Lemmon Survey	LIX	2.2 km	MPC · JPL
890397	2013 WM_{125}	—	November 28, 2013	Mount Lemmon	Mount Lemmon Survey	·	730 m	MPC · JPL
890398	2013 WB_{126}	—	November 28, 2013	Mount Lemmon	Mount Lemmon Survey	·	1.3 km	MPC · JPL
890399	2013 WD_{126}	—	November 29, 2013	Mount Lemmon	Mount Lemmon Survey	·	2.5 km	MPC · JPL
890400	2013 WE_{126}	—	November 28, 2013	Kitt Peak	Spacewatch	·	1.1 km	MPC · JPL

== 890401–890500 ==
back to top

Designation			Discovery			Properties		Ref
Permanent	Provisional	Named after	Date	Site	Discoverer(s)	Category	Diam.	Ref
890401	2013 WK_{130}	—	November 29, 2013	Mount Lemmon	Mount Lemmon Survey	·	630 m	MPC · JPL
890402	2013 WT_{130}	—	November 28, 2013	Mount Lemmon	Mount Lemmon Survey	·	990 m	MPC · JPL
890403	2013 WG_{133}	—	November 28, 2013	Mount Lemmon	Mount Lemmon Survey	PHO	710 m	MPC · JPL
890404	2013 WU_{134}	—	November 26, 2013	Mount Lemmon	Mount Lemmon Survey	(194)	850 m	MPC · JPL
890405	2013 WK_{135}	—	November 27, 2013	Haleakala	Pan-STARRS 1	·	2.1 km	MPC · JPL
890406	2013 WO_{135}	—	November 28, 2013	Mount Lemmon	Mount Lemmon Survey	·	1.9 km	MPC · JPL
890407	2013 WZ_{136}	—	November 28, 2013	Mount Lemmon	Mount Lemmon Survey	·	790 m	MPC · JPL
890408	2013 WL_{138}	—	November 28, 2013	Mount Lemmon	Mount Lemmon Survey	·	2.0 km	MPC · JPL
890409	2013 WZ_{146}	—	November 27, 2013	Haleakala	Pan-STARRS 1	·	1.9 km	MPC · JPL
890410	2013 XF_{30}	—	December 4, 2013	Haleakala	Pan-STARRS 1	JUN	710 m	MPC · JPL
890411	2013 XU_{36}	—	December 3, 2013	Haleakala	Pan-STARRS 1	·	680 m	MPC · JPL
890412	2013 XF_{37}	—	December 7, 2013	Kitt Peak	Spacewatch	·	2.2 km	MPC · JPL
890413	2013 XA_{42}	—	December 7, 2013	Haleakala	Pan-STARRS 1	·	1.9 km	MPC · JPL
890414	2013 XZ_{42}	—	December 3, 2013	Haleakala	Pan-STARRS 1	·	1.5 km	MPC · JPL
890415	2013 XM_{44}	—	December 7, 2013	Mount Lemmon	Mount Lemmon Survey	·	2.5 km	MPC · JPL
890416	2013 YE_{12}	—	December 18, 2009	Mount Lemmon	Mount Lemmon Survey	(5)	810 m	MPC · JPL
890417	2013 YL_{21}	—	December 22, 2013	Haleakala	Pan-STARRS 1	T_{j} (2.98)	2.1 km	MPC · JPL
890418	2013 YA_{29}	—	December 13, 2013	Mount Lemmon	Mount Lemmon Survey	(5)	850 m	MPC · JPL
890419	2013 YT_{31}	—	December 25, 2013	Mount Lemmon	Mount Lemmon Survey	·	2.0 km	MPC · JPL
890420	2013 YV_{79}	—	April 25, 2007	Mount Lemmon	Mount Lemmon Survey	·	920 m	MPC · JPL
890421	2013 YY_{99}	—	October 8, 2008	Kitt Peak	Spacewatch	MIS	1.7 km	MPC · JPL
890422	2013 YO_{101}	—	December 31, 2013	Mount Lemmon	Mount Lemmon Survey	TIR	2.0 km	MPC · JPL
890423	2013 YS_{105}	—	December 30, 2013	Kitt Peak	Spacewatch	·	690 m	MPC · JPL
890424	2013 YV_{107}	—	November 17, 2009	Mount Lemmon	Mount Lemmon Survey	·	590 m	MPC · JPL
890425	2013 YE_{113}	—	December 30, 2013	Kitt Peak	Spacewatch	·	750 m	MPC · JPL
890426	2013 YM_{119}	—	December 30, 2013	Haleakala	Pan-STARRS 1	·	720 m	MPC · JPL
890427	2013 YG_{120}	—	December 11, 2013	Haleakala	Pan-STARRS 1	·	750 m	MPC · JPL
890428	2013 YO_{120}	—	December 30, 2013	Haleakala	Pan-STARRS 1	·	2.4 km	MPC · JPL
890429	2013 YA_{122}	—	December 30, 2013	Haleakala	Pan-STARRS 1	·	990 m	MPC · JPL
890430	2013 YK_{133}	—	December 31, 2013	Mount Lemmon	Mount Lemmon Survey	PHO	570 m	MPC · JPL
890431	2013 YP_{142}	—	December 13, 2013	Mount Lemmon	Mount Lemmon Survey	·	1.2 km	MPC · JPL
890432	2013 YQ_{151}	—	December 25, 2013	Kitt Peak	Spacewatch	·	1.1 km	MPC · JPL
890433	2013 YF_{157}	—	December 28, 2013	Kitt Peak	Spacewatch	·	860 m	MPC · JPL
890434	2013 YK_{157}	—	December 23, 2013	Mount Lemmon	Mount Lemmon Survey	·	970 m	MPC · JPL
890435	2013 YQ_{157}	—	December 30, 2013	Haleakala	Pan-STARRS 1	·	1.1 km	MPC · JPL
890436	2013 YA_{158}	—	December 28, 2013	Kitt Peak	Spacewatch	·	550 m	MPC · JPL
890437	2013 YL_{158}	—	December 29, 2013	Haleakala	Pan-STARRS 1	·	1 km	MPC · JPL
890438	2013 YZ_{158}	—	December 31, 2013	Haleakala	Pan-STARRS 1	3:2	4.3 km	MPC · JPL
890439	2013 YW_{159}	—	December 24, 2013	Mount Lemmon	Mount Lemmon Survey	(18466)	1.5 km	MPC · JPL
890440	2013 YR_{160}	—	December 24, 2013	Mount Lemmon	Mount Lemmon Survey	·	680 m	MPC · JPL
890441	2013 YS_{163}	—	December 30, 2013	Kitt Peak	Spacewatch	·	920 m	MPC · JPL
890442	2013 YU_{174}	—	December 31, 2013	Mount Lemmon	Mount Lemmon Survey	·	2.1 km	MPC · JPL
890443	2013 YV_{174}	—	December 27, 2013	Mount Lemmon	Mount Lemmon Survey	·	1.8 km	MPC · JPL
890444	2014 AW_{24}	—	January 7, 2010	Kitt Peak	Spacewatch	·	550 m	MPC · JPL
890445	2014 AB_{28}	—	December 30, 2013	Catalina	CSS	·	1.6 km	MPC · JPL
890446	2014 AD_{41}	—	January 5, 2014	Haleakala	Pan-STARRS 1	·	510 m	MPC · JPL
890447	2014 AE_{44}	—	January 9, 2014	Mount Lemmon	Mount Lemmon Survey	·	1.8 km	MPC · JPL
890448	2014 AQ_{44}	—	December 15, 2009	Mount Lemmon	Mount Lemmon Survey	EUN	770 m	MPC · JPL
890449	2014 AB_{47}	—	January 7, 2014	Kitt Peak	Spacewatch	·	2.0 km	MPC · JPL
890450	2014 AG_{56}	—	January 1, 2014	Kitt Peak	Spacewatch	·	710 m	MPC · JPL
890451	2014 AS_{62}	—	January 7, 2014	Mount Lemmon	Mount Lemmon Survey	·	1.0 km	MPC · JPL
890452	2014 AN_{64}	—	January 4, 2014	Haleakala	Pan-STARRS 1	·	870 m	MPC · JPL
890453	2014 AY_{65}	—	January 2, 2014	Kitt Peak	Spacewatch	·	930 m	MPC · JPL
890454	2014 AA_{66}	—	January 10, 2014	Mount Lemmon	Mount Lemmon Survey	·	740 m	MPC · JPL
890455	2014 AB_{67}	—	January 9, 2014	Mount Lemmon	Mount Lemmon Survey	·	2.0 km	MPC · JPL
890456	2014 AO_{67}	—	December 30, 2013	Mount Lemmon	Mount Lemmon Survey	·	2.0 km	MPC · JPL
890457	2014 AK_{68}	—	January 9, 2014	Kitt Peak	Spacewatch	(13314)	1.2 km	MPC · JPL
890458	2014 AT_{68}	—	January 1, 2014	Haleakala	Pan-STARRS 1	·	2.2 km	MPC · JPL
890459	2014 AD_{69}	—	January 5, 2014	Haleakala	Pan-STARRS 1	·	1.9 km	MPC · JPL
890460	2014 AN_{70}	—	January 1, 2014	Kitt Peak	Spacewatch	·	3.1 km	MPC · JPL
890461	2014 AQ_{76}	—	January 3, 2014	Mount Lemmon	Mount Lemmon Survey	·	450 m	MPC · JPL
890462	2014 AG_{77}	—	January 9, 2014	Kitt Peak	Spacewatch	·	930 m	MPC · JPL
890463	2014 AM_{77}	—	January 1, 2014	Haleakala	Pan-STARRS 1	·	980 m	MPC · JPL
890464	2014 AR_{81}	—	January 7, 2014	Mount Lemmon	Mount Lemmon Survey	·	850 m	MPC · JPL
890465	2014 BC	—	January 10, 2006	Catalina	CSS	·	1.7 km	MPC · JPL
890466	2014 BF_{5}	—	December 31, 2013	Haleakala	Pan-STARRS 1	·	870 m	MPC · JPL
890467	2014 BP_{9}	—	January 1, 2014	Haleakala	Pan-STARRS 1	H	220 m	MPC · JPL
890468	2014 BN_{14}	—	January 4, 2014	Haleakala	Pan-STARRS 1	·	1.1 km	MPC · JPL
890469	2014 BB_{16}	—	January 23, 2014	Mount Lemmon	Mount Lemmon Survey	·	880 m	MPC · JPL
890470	2014 BQ_{16}	—	January 23, 2014	Mount Lemmon	Mount Lemmon Survey	H	250 m	MPC · JPL
890471	2014 BH_{20}	—	December 30, 2013	Mount Lemmon	Mount Lemmon Survey	·	820 m	MPC · JPL
890472	2014 BB_{65}	—	January 23, 2014	Mount Lemmon	Mount Lemmon Survey	H	270 m	MPC · JPL
890473	2014 BX_{71}	—	January 23, 2014	Mount Lemmon	Mount Lemmon Survey	·	1.3 km	MPC · JPL
890474	2014 BD_{78}	—	January 18, 2014	Haleakala	Pan-STARRS 1	EUP	2.4 km	MPC · JPL
890475	2014 BK_{80}	—	January 21, 2014	Mount Lemmon	Mount Lemmon Survey	·	450 m	MPC · JPL
890476	2014 BF_{83}	—	January 21, 2014	Kitt Peak	Spacewatch	·	580 m	MPC · JPL
890477	2014 BP_{84}	—	January 24, 2014	Haleakala	Pan-STARRS 1	·	620 m	MPC · JPL
890478	2014 BH_{85}	—	January 24, 2014	Haleakala	Pan-STARRS 1	·	770 m	MPC · JPL
890479	2014 BG_{88}	—	January 30, 2014	Kitt Peak	Spacewatch	·	700 m	MPC · JPL
890480	2014 BH_{88}	—	February 5, 2006	Mount Lemmon	Mount Lemmon Survey	·	740 m	MPC · JPL
890481	2014 BL_{88}	—	January 29, 2014	Kitt Peak	Spacewatch	·	610 m	MPC · JPL
890482	2014 BY_{88}	—	January 24, 2014	Haleakala	Pan-STARRS 1	·	900 m	MPC · JPL
890483	2014 CM_{1}	—	December 30, 2013	Mount Lemmon	Mount Lemmon Survey	·	2.0 km	MPC · JPL
890484	2014 CQ_{1}	—	January 2, 2014	Kitt Peak	Spacewatch	·	2.0 km	MPC · JPL
890485	2014 CO_{14}	—	January 25, 2014	Haleakala	Pan-STARRS 1	·	400 m	MPC · JPL
890486	2014 CG_{29}	—	February 10, 2014	Mount Lemmon	Mount Lemmon Survey	·	840 m	MPC · JPL
890487	2014 CX_{29}	—	February 10, 2014	Haleakala	Pan-STARRS 1	·	570 m	MPC · JPL
890488	2014 CD_{33}	—	February 10, 2014	Haleakala	Pan-STARRS 1	·	2.4 km	MPC · JPL
890489	2014 CQ_{33}	—	February 10, 2014	Haleakala	Pan-STARRS 1	·	490 m	MPC · JPL
890490	2014 CH_{36}	—	February 10, 2014	Mount Lemmon	Mount Lemmon Survey	·	800 m	MPC · JPL
890491	2014 CS_{36}	—	February 10, 2014	Haleakala	Pan-STARRS 1	·	1.3 km	MPC · JPL
890492	2014 DL_{3}	—	January 25, 2014	Haleakala	Pan-STARRS 1	H	280 m	MPC · JPL
890493	2014 DA_{5}	—	February 17, 2010	Kitt Peak	Spacewatch	(5)	730 m	MPC · JPL
890494	2014 DV_{15}	—	February 11, 2014	Mount Lemmon	Mount Lemmon Survey	·	840 m	MPC · JPL
890495	2014 DG_{19}	—	February 9, 2014	Kitt Peak	Spacewatch	H	380 m	MPC · JPL
890496	2014 DV_{59}	—	February 26, 2014	Haleakala	Pan-STARRS 1	·	460 m	MPC · JPL
890497	2014 DH_{65}	—	February 26, 2014	Haleakala	Pan-STARRS 1	·	560 m	MPC · JPL
890498	2014 DU_{73}	—	February 26, 2014	Haleakala	Pan-STARRS 1	·	740 m	MPC · JPL
890499	2014 DC_{93}	—	February 26, 2014	Mount Lemmon	Mount Lemmon Survey	·	660 m	MPC · JPL
890500	2014 DQ_{102}	—	January 31, 2006	Kitt Peak	Spacewatch	·	480 m	MPC · JPL

== 890501–890600 ==
back to top

Designation			Discovery			Properties		Ref
Permanent	Provisional	Named after	Date	Site	Discoverer(s)	Category	Diam.	Ref
890501	2014 DR_{156}	—	February 25, 2014	Haleakala	Pan-STARRS 1	·	990 m	MPC · JPL
890502	2014 DV_{156}	—	February 28, 2014	Haleakala	Pan-STARRS 1	·	950 m	MPC · JPL
890503	2014 DL_{157}	—	February 27, 2014	Haleakala	Pan-STARRS 1	·	810 m	MPC · JPL
890504	2014 DJ_{158}	—	February 26, 2014	Haleakala	Pan-STARRS 1	(5)	760 m	MPC · JPL
890505	2014 DA_{159}	—	February 22, 2014	Mount Lemmon	Mount Lemmon Survey	·	610 m	MPC · JPL
890506	2014 DD_{160}	—	February 28, 2014	Haleakala	Pan-STARRS 1	·	920 m	MPC · JPL
890507	2014 DH_{160}	—	February 26, 2014	Haleakala	Pan-STARRS 1	·	590 m	MPC · JPL
890508	2014 DM_{161}	—	February 28, 2014	Haleakala	Pan-STARRS 1	·	680 m	MPC · JPL
890509	2014 DZ_{163}	—	February 26, 2014	Haleakala	Pan-STARRS 1	·	630 m	MPC · JPL
890510	2014 DG_{164}	—	February 26, 2014	Haleakala	Pan-STARRS 1	·	770 m	MPC · JPL
890511	2014 DN_{171}	—	February 19, 2014	Mount Lemmon	Mount Lemmon Survey	·	2.3 km	MPC · JPL
890512	2014 DQ_{171}	—	February 26, 2014	Haleakala	Pan-STARRS 1	·	730 m	MPC · JPL
890513	2014 DY_{173}	—	February 26, 2014	Mount Lemmon	Mount Lemmon Survey	·	2.5 km	MPC · JPL
890514	2014 DK_{175}	—	February 26, 2014	Mount Lemmon	Mount Lemmon Survey	·	910 m	MPC · JPL
890515	2014 DT_{175}	—	February 28, 2014	Haleakala	Pan-STARRS 1	·	350 m	MPC · JPL
890516	2014 DC_{176}	—	February 20, 2014	Mount Lemmon	Mount Lemmon Survey	·	1.0 km	MPC · JPL
890517	2014 DE_{176}	—	February 28, 2014	Haleakala	Pan-STARRS 1	·	830 m	MPC · JPL
890518	2014 DC_{177}	—	February 28, 2014	Haleakala	Pan-STARRS 1	·	810 m	MPC · JPL
890519	2014 DF_{180}	—	February 28, 2014	Haleakala	Pan-STARRS 1	·	1.0 km	MPC · JPL
890520	2014 DW_{180}	—	February 28, 2014	Haleakala	Pan-STARRS 1	·	1.1 km	MPC · JPL
890521	2014 DY_{180}	—	April 24, 2006	Kitt Peak	Spacewatch	·	800 m	MPC · JPL
890522	2014 DQ_{183}	—	February 26, 2014	Haleakala	Pan-STARRS 1	·	430 m	MPC · JPL
890523	2014 DE_{187}	—	February 26, 2014	Haleakala	Pan-STARRS 1	·	530 m	MPC · JPL
890524	2014 DF_{187}	—	February 27, 2014	Haleakala	Pan-STARRS 1	·	660 m	MPC · JPL
890525	2014 DC_{193}	—	February 28, 2014	Haleakala	Pan-STARRS 1	·	920 m	MPC · JPL
890526	2014 DJ_{193}	—	April 9, 2010	Mount Lemmon	Mount Lemmon Survey	·	760 m	MPC · JPL
890527	2014 DK_{193}	—	February 19, 2014	Mount Lemmon	Mount Lemmon Survey	·	760 m	MPC · JPL
890528	2014 DM_{193}	—	February 24, 2014	Haleakala	Pan-STARRS 1	·	940 m	MPC · JPL
890529	2014 DQ_{193}	—	February 18, 2010	Kitt Peak	Spacewatch	·	620 m	MPC · JPL
890530	2014 DS_{193}	—	March 3, 2006	Kitt Peak	Spacewatch	·	500 m	MPC · JPL
890531	2014 DZ_{193}	—	February 28, 2014	Haleakala	Pan-STARRS 1	·	810 m	MPC · JPL
890532	2014 DO_{194}	—	February 28, 2014	Haleakala	Pan-STARRS 1	L4	5.7 km	MPC · JPL
890533	2014 DQ_{195}	—	February 26, 2014	Haleakala	Pan-STARRS 1	·	630 m	MPC · JPL
890534	2014 DC_{199}	—	February 26, 2014	Haleakala	Pan-STARRS 1	·	1.2 km	MPC · JPL
890535	2014 DY_{199}	—	February 26, 2014	Haleakala	Pan-STARRS 1	·	640 m	MPC · JPL
890536	2014 EB_{12}	—	March 7, 2014	Mount Lemmon	Mount Lemmon Survey	T_{j} (2.98)	2.4 km	MPC · JPL
890537	2014 EH_{26}	—	October 17, 2012	Haleakala	Pan-STARRS 1	(5)	690 m	MPC · JPL
890538	2014 EO_{36}	—	March 8, 2014	Mount Lemmon	Mount Lemmon Survey	·	840 m	MPC · JPL
890539	2014 EL_{37}	—	March 8, 2014	Mount Lemmon	Mount Lemmon Survey	·	790 m	MPC · JPL
890540	2014 EH_{40}	—	March 8, 2014	Mount Lemmon	Mount Lemmon Survey	·	2.4 km	MPC · JPL
890541	2014 EJ_{62}	—	May 1, 2016	Haleakala	Pan-STARRS 1	L4	6.2 km	MPC · JPL
890542	2014 EX_{86}	—	October 18, 2012	Haleakala	Pan-STARRS 1	·	990 m	MPC · JPL
890543	2014 EG_{100}	—	July 4, 2016	Haleakala	Pan-STARRS 1	·	1.2 km	MPC · JPL
890544	2014 ER_{116}	—	February 28, 2014	Haleakala	Pan-STARRS 1	·	630 m	MPC · JPL
890545	2014 EO_{140}	—	October 10, 2016	Haleakala	Pan-STARRS 1	·	750 m	MPC · JPL
890546	2014 ED_{148}	—	November 9, 2009	Kitt Peak	Spacewatch	·	500 m	MPC · JPL
890547	2014 EG_{186}	—	February 28, 2014	Haleakala	Pan-STARRS 1	MAR	560 m	MPC · JPL
890548	2014 EX_{198}	—	February 28, 2014	Haleakala	Pan-STARRS 1	V	360 m	MPC · JPL
890549	2014 EE_{205}	—	August 30, 2016	Haleakala	Pan-STARRS 1	EUN	700 m	MPC · JPL
890550	2014 EL_{206}	—	October 4, 2016	Kitt Peak	Spacewatch	MAR	660 m	MPC · JPL
890551	2014 EH_{210}	—	February 28, 2014	Haleakala	Pan-STARRS 1	·	740 m	MPC · JPL
890552	2014 EC_{220}	—	April 18, 2015	Cerro Tololo-DECam	DECam	L4	5.3 km	MPC · JPL
890553	2014 EN_{250}	—	March 12, 2014	Kitt Peak	Spacewatch	·	460 m	MPC · JPL
890554	2014 ET_{250}	—	March 8, 2014	Mount Lemmon	Mount Lemmon Survey	EUN	680 m	MPC · JPL
890555	2014 EV_{250}	—	March 6, 2014	Mount Lemmon	Mount Lemmon Survey	·	1.0 km	MPC · JPL
890556	2014 EY_{250}	—	March 11, 2014	Mount Lemmon	Mount Lemmon Survey	·	620 m	MPC · JPL
890557	2014 EJ_{252}	—	March 12, 2014	Kitt Peak	Spacewatch	EUN	590 m	MPC · JPL
890558	2014 EX_{255}	—	March 12, 2014	Mount Lemmon	Mount Lemmon Survey	V	410 m	MPC · JPL
890559	2014 EB_{256}	—	March 11, 2014	Mount Lemmon	Mount Lemmon Survey	·	710 m	MPC · JPL
890560	2014 ED_{256}	—	February 28, 2014	Haleakala	Pan-STARRS 1	·	750 m	MPC · JPL
890561	2014 EY_{257}	—	March 11, 2014	Mount Lemmon	Mount Lemmon Survey	·	740 m	MPC · JPL
890562	2014 FR	—	March 21, 2014	Mount Lemmon	Mount Lemmon Survey	·	1.5 km	MPC · JPL
890563	2014 FL_{3}	—	October 16, 2012	Mount Lemmon	Mount Lemmon Survey	EUN	690 m	MPC · JPL
890564	2014 FG_{16}	—	March 22, 2014	Mount Lemmon	Mount Lemmon Survey	·	470 m	MPC · JPL
890565	2014 FC_{18}	—	February 28, 2014	Haleakala	Pan-STARRS 1	·	630 m	MPC · JPL
890566	2014 FS_{19}	—	March 6, 2014	Haleakala	Pan-STARRS 1	·	440 m	MPC · JPL
890567	2014 FG_{27}	—	March 7, 2014	Mount Lemmon	Mount Lemmon Survey	·	700 m	MPC · JPL
890568	2014 FA_{28}	—	February 28, 2014	Haleakala	Pan-STARRS 1	·	700 m	MPC · JPL
890569	2014 FZ_{37}	—	March 25, 2014	Haleakala	Pan-STARRS 1	H	310 m	MPC · JPL
890570	2014 FJ_{38}	—	March 11, 2014	Mount Lemmon	Mount Lemmon Survey	H	320 m	MPC · JPL
890571	2014 FV_{40}	—	March 25, 2014	Kitt Peak	Spacewatch	·	950 m	MPC · JPL
890572	2014 FL_{76}	—	March 31, 2014	Mount Lemmon	Mount Lemmon Survey	·	650 m	MPC · JPL
890573	2014 FX_{77}	—	March 24, 2014	Haleakala	Pan-STARRS 1	·	550 m	MPC · JPL
890574	2014 FY_{77}	—	March 26, 2014	Mount Lemmon	Mount Lemmon Survey	·	810 m	MPC · JPL
890575	2014 FX_{78}	—	March 24, 2014	Haleakala	Pan-STARRS 1	·	990 m	MPC · JPL
890576	2014 FY_{79}	—	December 15, 2017	Mount Lemmon	Mount Lemmon Survey	·	1.2 km	MPC · JPL
890577	2014 FX_{83}	—	March 29, 2014	Kitt Peak	Spacewatch	·	630 m	MPC · JPL
890578	2014 FK_{85}	—	March 28, 2014	Mount Lemmon	Mount Lemmon Survey	·	690 m	MPC · JPL
890579	2014 FU_{88}	—	March 22, 2014	Mount Lemmon	Mount Lemmon Survey	·	960 m	MPC · JPL
890580	2014 FJ_{89}	—	March 28, 2014	Mount Lemmon	Mount Lemmon Survey	·	930 m	MPC · JPL
890581	2014 FD_{90}	—	March 28, 2014	Kitt Peak	Spacewatch	·	550 m	MPC · JPL
890582	2014 FK_{90}	—	March 24, 2014	Haleakala	Pan-STARRS 1	·	590 m	MPC · JPL
890583	2014 GB_{12}	—	March 25, 2014	Kitt Peak	Spacewatch	·	680 m	MPC · JPL
890584	2014 GZ_{14}	—	March 16, 2007	Mount Lemmon	Mount Lemmon Survey	·	430 m	MPC · JPL
890585	2014 GW_{52}	—	April 9, 2014	Haleakala	Pan-STARRS 1	·	920 m	MPC · JPL
890586	2014 GP_{55}	—	April 5, 2014	Haleakala	Pan-STARRS 1	·	880 m	MPC · JPL
890587	2014 GT_{64}	—	April 10, 2014	Haleakala	Pan-STARRS 1	·	850 m	MPC · JPL
890588	2014 GU_{68}	—	April 9, 2014	Mount Lemmon	Mount Lemmon Survey	·	830 m	MPC · JPL
890589	2014 GJ_{70}	—	April 5, 2014	Haleakala	Pan-STARRS 1	H	310 m	MPC · JPL
890590	2014 GV_{70}	—	April 2, 2014	Mount Lemmon	Mount Lemmon Survey	·	820 m	MPC · JPL
890591	2014 GE_{71}	—	April 5, 2014	Haleakala	Pan-STARRS 1	·	620 m	MPC · JPL
890592	2014 GM_{71}	—	April 5, 2014	Haleakala	Pan-STARRS 1	NYS	710 m	MPC · JPL
890593	2014 GL_{74}	—	April 5, 2014	Haleakala	Pan-STARRS 1	·	810 m	MPC · JPL
890594	2014 GZ_{75}	—	April 7, 2014	Mount Lemmon	Mount Lemmon Survey	·	740 m	MPC · JPL
890595	2014 GX_{78}	—	April 4, 2014	Mount Lemmon	Mount Lemmon Survey	EUN	640 m	MPC · JPL
890596	2014 GH_{80}	—	April 1, 2014	Mount Lemmon	Mount Lemmon Survey	·	470 m	MPC · JPL
890597	2014 GM_{81}	—	April 5, 2014	Haleakala	Pan-STARRS 1	MAR	740 m	MPC · JPL
890598	2014 GH_{85}	—	April 4, 2014	Haleakala	Pan-STARRS 1	·	1.0 km	MPC · JPL
890599	2014 GM_{86}	—	April 5, 2014	Haleakala	Pan-STARRS 1	·	880 m	MPC · JPL
890600	2014 GN_{86}	—	April 5, 2014	Haleakala	Pan-STARRS 1	(5)	740 m	MPC · JPL

== 890601–890700 ==
back to top

Designation			Discovery			Properties		Ref
Permanent	Provisional	Named after	Date	Site	Discoverer(s)	Category	Diam.	Ref
890601	2014 GS_{89}	—	April 5, 2014	Haleakala	Pan-STARRS 1	·	1.1 km	MPC · JPL
890602	2014 GW_{89}	—	April 6, 2014	Mount Lemmon	Mount Lemmon Survey	·	870 m	MPC · JPL
890603	2014 GZ_{89}	—	April 4, 2014	Haleakala	Pan-STARRS 1	MAR	670 m	MPC · JPL
890604	2014 GD_{90}	—	April 14, 2010	Mount Lemmon	Mount Lemmon Survey	·	900 m	MPC · JPL
890605	2014 GG_{91}	—	April 5, 2014	Haleakala	Pan-STARRS 1	·	640 m	MPC · JPL
890606	2014 HC_{18}	—	April 4, 2014	Haleakala	Pan-STARRS 1	·	840 m	MPC · JPL
890607	2014 HB_{19}	—	April 7, 2014	Kitt Peak	Spacewatch	·	1.1 km	MPC · JPL
890608	2014 HN_{21}	—	April 5, 2014	Haleakala	Pan-STARRS 1	(2076)	460 m	MPC · JPL
890609	2014 HX_{22}	—	April 21, 2014	Mount Lemmon	Mount Lemmon Survey	(194)	1.0 km	MPC · JPL
890610	2014 HN_{24}	—	April 8, 2010	Kitt Peak	Spacewatch	·	740 m	MPC · JPL
890611	2014 HE_{38}	—	April 5, 2014	Haleakala	Pan-STARRS 1	EUN	680 m	MPC · JPL
890612	2014 HT_{45}	—	April 5, 2014	Haleakala	Pan-STARRS 1	·	850 m	MPC · JPL
890613	2014 HV_{52}	—	April 4, 2014	Haleakala	Pan-STARRS 1	NYS	600 m	MPC · JPL
890614	2014 HM_{59}	—	April 23, 2014	Cerro Tololo-DECam	DECam	·	680 m	MPC · JPL
890615	2014 HS_{64}	—	April 23, 2014	Cerro Tololo-DECam	DECam	·	1.1 km	MPC · JPL
890616	2014 HF_{74}	—	January 10, 2014	Haleakala	Pan-STARRS 1	·	880 m	MPC · JPL
890617	2014 HO_{90}	—	April 2, 2014	Kitt Peak	Spacewatch	·	820 m	MPC · JPL
890618	2014 HE_{96}	—	November 20, 2008	Kitt Peak	Spacewatch	·	720 m	MPC · JPL
890619	2014 HX_{119}	—	April 24, 2014	Mount Lemmon	Mount Lemmon Survey	·	680 m	MPC · JPL
890620	2014 HO_{124}	—	April 26, 2014	Mount Lemmon	Mount Lemmon Survey	·	680 m	MPC · JPL
890621	2014 HJ_{127}	—	April 5, 2014	Haleakala	Pan-STARRS 1	·	700 m	MPC · JPL
890622	2014 HJ_{145}	—	March 12, 2014	Kitt Peak	Spacewatch	·	1.3 km	MPC · JPL
890623	2014 HC_{146}	—	February 28, 2014	Haleakala	Pan-STARRS 1	·	620 m	MPC · JPL
890624	2014 HQ_{149}	—	April 1, 2014	Mount Lemmon	Mount Lemmon Survey	·	960 m	MPC · JPL
890625	2014 HE_{158}	—	April 24, 2014	Mount Lemmon	Mount Lemmon Survey	·	650 m	MPC · JPL
890626	2014 HO_{168}	—	April 25, 2014	Mount Lemmon	Mount Lemmon Survey	·	740 m	MPC · JPL
890627	2014 HM_{174}	—	April 5, 2014	Haleakala	Pan-STARRS 1	HNS	740 m	MPC · JPL
890628	2014 HQ_{174}	—	April 5, 2014	Haleakala	Pan-STARRS 1	·	850 m	MPC · JPL
890629	2014 HE_{176}	—	April 5, 2014	Haleakala	Pan-STARRS 1	·	560 m	MPC · JPL
890630	2014 HF_{178}	—	April 5, 2014	Haleakala	Pan-STARRS 1	·	360 m	MPC · JPL
890631	2014 HF_{182}	—	March 24, 2014	Haleakala	Pan-STARRS 1	·	720 m	MPC · JPL
890632	2014 HC_{187}	—	April 30, 2014	Haleakala	Pan-STARRS 1	(5)	610 m	MPC · JPL
890633	2014 HX_{206}	—	April 30, 2014	Haleakala	Pan-STARRS 1	·	1.2 km	MPC · JPL
890634	2014 HZ_{211}	—	June 15, 2010	Mount Lemmon	Mount Lemmon Survey	·	660 m	MPC · JPL
890635	2014 HB_{212}	—	April 22, 2014	Mount Lemmon	Mount Lemmon Survey	·	740 m	MPC · JPL
890636	2014 HF_{213}	—	April 21, 2014	Kitt Peak	Spacewatch	·	580 m	MPC · JPL
890637	2014 HY_{213}	—	April 25, 2014	Mount Lemmon	Mount Lemmon Survey	HNS	670 m	MPC · JPL
890638	2014 HN_{223}	—	April 30, 2014	Haleakala	Pan-STARRS 1	·	540 m	MPC · JPL
890639	2014 HM_{224}	—	April 25, 2014	Mount Lemmon	Mount Lemmon Survey	·	720 m	MPC · JPL
890640	2014 HO_{224}	—	April 29, 2014	Haleakala	Pan-STARRS 1	·	740 m	MPC · JPL
890641	2014 HT_{224}	—	April 23, 2014	Mount Lemmon	Mount Lemmon Survey	·	1.2 km	MPC · JPL
890642	2014 HE_{227}	—	April 25, 2014	Mount Lemmon	Mount Lemmon Survey	·	760 m	MPC · JPL
890643	2014 HK_{228}	—	April 23, 2014	Haleakala	Pan-STARRS 1	·	1.2 km	MPC · JPL
890644	2014 HJ_{231}	—	April 2, 2014	Mount Lemmon	Mount Lemmon Survey	MAR	630 m	MPC · JPL
890645	2014 HZ_{234}	—	April 28, 2014	Mount Lemmon	Mount Lemmon Survey	·	830 m	MPC · JPL
890646	2014 HH_{236}	—	April 30, 2014	Haleakala	Pan-STARRS 1	·	1.2 km	MPC · JPL
890647	2014 HK_{237}	—	April 29, 2014	Haleakala	Pan-STARRS 1	·	950 m	MPC · JPL
890648	2014 HR_{259}	—	April 30, 2014	Haleakala	Pan-STARRS 1	·	800 m	MPC · JPL
890649	2014 HG_{280}	—	April 29, 2014	Haleakala	Pan-STARRS 1	·	720 m	MPC · JPL
890650	2014 HN_{321}	—	April 28, 2014	Cerro Tololo-DECam	DECam	·	1.2 km	MPC · JPL
890651	2014 HZ_{533}	—	April 25, 2014	Mount Lemmon	Mount Lemmon Survey	·	900 m	MPC · JPL
890652	2014 JS_{1}	—	April 5, 2014	Haleakala	Pan-STARRS 1	KON	1.5 km	MPC · JPL
890653	2014 JZ_{14}	—	March 29, 2014	Haleakala	Pan-STARRS 1	·	1.0 km	MPC · JPL
890654	2014 JV_{27}	—	April 20, 2014	Kitt Peak	Spacewatch	·	850 m	MPC · JPL
890655	2014 JQ_{29}	—	May 6, 2014	Mount Lemmon	Mount Lemmon Survey	·	890 m	MPC · JPL
890656	2014 JR_{29}	—	April 8, 2014	Haleakala	Pan-STARRS 1	·	830 m	MPC · JPL
890657	2014 JZ_{30}	—	May 1, 2009	Mount Lemmon	Mount Lemmon Survey	H	410 m	MPC · JPL
890658	2014 JZ_{33}	—	May 4, 2014	Kitt Peak	Spacewatch	ADE	1.3 km	MPC · JPL
890659	2014 JC_{37}	—	May 7, 2010	Mount Lemmon	Mount Lemmon Survey	·	660 m	MPC · JPL
890660	2014 JK_{41}	—	April 25, 2014	Mount Lemmon	Mount Lemmon Survey	·	660 m	MPC · JPL
890661	2014 JY_{56}	—	May 10, 2014	Mount Lemmon	Mount Lemmon Survey	H	360 m	MPC · JPL
890662	2014 JG_{76}	—	April 22, 2014	Kitt Peak	Spacewatch	·	700 m	MPC · JPL
890663	2014 JZ_{77}	—	March 28, 2014	Mount Lemmon	Mount Lemmon Survey	·	810 m	MPC · JPL
890664	2014 JL_{83}	—	May 8, 2014	Haleakala	Pan-STARRS 1	·	950 m	MPC · JPL
890665	2014 JA_{93}	—	May 10, 2014	Haleakala	Pan-STARRS 1	·	700 m	MPC · JPL
890666	2014 JX_{93}	—	May 4, 2014	Haleakala	Pan-STARRS 1	·	870 m	MPC · JPL
890667	2014 JB_{94}	—	May 5, 2014	Kitt Peak	Spacewatch	·	860 m	MPC · JPL
890668	2014 JJ_{94}	—	May 7, 2014	Haleakala	Pan-STARRS 1	EUN	870 m	MPC · JPL
890669	2014 JE_{95}	—	May 8, 2014	Haleakala	Pan-STARRS 1	·	670 m	MPC · JPL
890670	2014 JQ_{95}	—	September 23, 2011	Haleakala	Pan-STARRS 1	·	690 m	MPC · JPL
890671	2014 JX_{96}	—	May 7, 2014	Haleakala	Pan-STARRS 1	·	1.0 km	MPC · JPL
890672	2014 JM_{101}	—	May 8, 2014	Haleakala	Pan-STARRS 1	·	720 m	MPC · JPL
890673	2014 JC_{102}	—	May 6, 2014	Haleakala	Pan-STARRS 1	·	1.2 km	MPC · JPL
890674	2014 JD_{102}	—	May 7, 2014	Haleakala	Pan-STARRS 1	·	1.3 km	MPC · JPL
890675	2014 JK_{103}	—	May 6, 2014	Haleakala	Pan-STARRS 1	·	690 m	MPC · JPL
890676	2014 JX_{104}	—	May 6, 2014	Haleakala	Pan-STARRS 1	·	930 m	MPC · JPL
890677	2014 JC_{105}	—	May 6, 2014	Haleakala	Pan-STARRS 1	·	710 m	MPC · JPL
890678	2014 JP_{110}	—	May 9, 2014	Haleakala	Pan-STARRS 1	·	1.7 km	MPC · JPL
890679	2014 JB_{111}	—	May 4, 2014	Kitt Peak	Spacewatch	·	1.8 km	MPC · JPL
890680	2014 JG_{112}	—	May 4, 2014	Haleakala	Pan-STARRS 1	·	1.0 km	MPC · JPL
890681	2014 JF_{113}	—	May 9, 2014	Haleakala	Pan-STARRS 1	MAR	660 m	MPC · JPL
890682	2014 JE_{114}	—	May 8, 2014	Haleakala	Pan-STARRS 1	·	1.7 km	MPC · JPL
890683	2014 JO_{115}	—	May 7, 2014	Haleakala	Pan-STARRS 1	HNS	790 m	MPC · JPL
890684	2014 JA_{120}	—	May 6, 2014	Haleakala	Pan-STARRS 1	·	1.1 km	MPC · JPL
890685	2014 JF_{125}	—	May 7, 2014	Haleakala	Pan-STARRS 1	·	760 m	MPC · JPL
890686	2014 JT_{129}	—	May 6, 2014	Haleakala	Pan-STARRS 1	·	1.2 km	MPC · JPL
890687	2014 JO_{134}	—	May 8, 2014	Haleakala	Pan-STARRS 1	·	690 m	MPC · JPL
890688	2014 JU_{136}	—	May 4, 2014	Haleakala	Pan-STARRS 1	·	720 m	MPC · JPL
890689	2014 JH_{145}	—	May 5, 2014	Mount Lemmon	Mount Lemmon Survey	·	900 m	MPC · JPL
890690	2014 KJ_{5}	—	May 5, 2000	Apache Point	SDSS	·	560 m	MPC · JPL
890691	2014 KP_{11}	—	May 21, 2014	Haleakala	Pan-STARRS 1	·	690 m	MPC · JPL
890692	2014 KQ_{37}	—	April 8, 2014	Haleakala	Pan-STARRS 1	MAR	610 m	MPC · JPL
890693	2014 KT_{72}	—	May 23, 2014	Haleakala	Pan-STARRS 1	·	620 m	MPC · JPL
890694	2014 KH_{88}	—	May 9, 2014	Haleakala	Pan-STARRS 1	·	780 m	MPC · JPL
890695	2014 KK_{92}	—	May 7, 2014	Haleakala	Pan-STARRS 1	·	760 m	MPC · JPL
890696	2014 KV_{96}	—	May 24, 2014	Haleakala	Pan-STARRS 1	·	1.9 km	MPC · JPL
890697	2014 KX_{103}	—	May 28, 2014	Haleakala	Pan-STARRS 1	·	2.3 km	MPC · JPL
890698	2014 KB_{114}	—	May 21, 2014	Haleakala	Pan-STARRS 1	·	820 m	MPC · JPL
890699	2014 KO_{115}	—	May 24, 2014	Haleakala	Pan-STARRS 1	·	650 m	MPC · JPL
890700	2014 KW_{116}	—	May 27, 2014	Mount Lemmon	Mount Lemmon Survey	·	1.3 km	MPC · JPL

== 890701–890800 ==
back to top

Designation			Discovery			Properties		Ref
Permanent	Provisional	Named after	Date	Site	Discoverer(s)	Category	Diam.	Ref
890701	2014 KY_{117}	—	May 21, 2014	Haleakala	Pan-STARRS 1	(5)	940 m	MPC · JPL
890702	2014 KD_{121}	—	September 10, 2015	Haleakala	Pan-STARRS 1	WIT	630 m	MPC · JPL
890703	2014 KY_{122}	—	May 21, 2014	Haleakala	Pan-STARRS 1	·	640 m	MPC · JPL
890704	2014 KL_{123}	—	May 23, 2014	Haleakala	Pan-STARRS 1	·	570 m	MPC · JPL
890705	2014 KY_{123}	—	May 20, 2014	Haleakala	Pan-STARRS 1	·	1.9 km	MPC · JPL
890706	2014 KE_{124}	—	May 28, 2014	Haleakala	Pan-STARRS 1	·	770 m	MPC · JPL
890707	2014 KF_{133}	—	May 23, 2014	Haleakala	Pan-STARRS 1	·	1.2 km	MPC · JPL
890708	2014 KX_{140}	—	May 21, 2014	Haleakala	Pan-STARRS 1	·	790 m	MPC · JPL
890709	2014 KP_{142}	—	May 21, 2014	Haleakala	Pan-STARRS 1	·	730 m	MPC · JPL
890710	2014 KF_{143}	—	May 20, 2014	Haleakala	Pan-STARRS 1	·	400 m	MPC · JPL
890711	2014 KD_{144}	—	May 27, 2014	Haleakala	Pan-STARRS 1	HNS	780 m	MPC · JPL
890712	2014 KH_{145}	—	May 23, 2014	Haleakala	Pan-STARRS 1	EUN	810 m	MPC · JPL
890713	2014 KG_{146}	—	May 23, 2014	Haleakala	Pan-STARRS 1	BRG	1.1 km	MPC · JPL
890714	2014 KJ_{148}	—	May 23, 2014	Haleakala	Pan-STARRS 1	·	940 m	MPC · JPL
890715	2014 KD_{150}	—	May 20, 2014	Haleakala	Pan-STARRS 1	(5)	850 m	MPC · JPL
890716	2014 KK_{150}	—	May 21, 2014	Haleakala	Pan-STARRS 1	·	660 m	MPC · JPL
890717	2014 KN_{150}	—	May 23, 2014	Haleakala	Pan-STARRS 1	3:2	3.4 km	MPC · JPL
890718	2014 KE_{157}	—	May 28, 2014	Mount Lemmon	Mount Lemmon Survey	H	310 m	MPC · JPL
890719	2014 LL_{1}	—	April 21, 2014	Kitt Peak	Spacewatch	·	1.2 km	MPC · JPL
890720	2014 LD_{10}	—	June 2, 2014	ESA OGS	E. Schwab	·	860 m	MPC · JPL
890721	2014 LL_{16}	—	March 28, 2014	Mount Lemmon	Mount Lemmon Survey	·	990 m	MPC · JPL
890722	2014 LS_{30}	—	May 21, 2010	Mount Lemmon	Mount Lemmon Survey	EUN	660 m	MPC · JPL
890723	2014 LP_{33}	—	June 4, 2014	Haleakala	Pan-STARRS 1	·	2.1 km	MPC · JPL
890724	2014 LL_{35}	—	June 7, 2014	Haleakala	Pan-STARRS 1	JUN	700 m	MPC · JPL
890725	2014 LO_{35}	—	June 5, 2014	Haleakala	Pan-STARRS 1	·	870 m	MPC · JPL
890726	2014 LD_{37}	—	June 2, 2014	Mount Lemmon	Mount Lemmon Survey	·	530 m	MPC · JPL
890727	2014 LM_{37}	—	June 5, 2014	Haleakala	Pan-STARRS 1	·	890 m	MPC · JPL
890728	2014 LN_{37}	—	June 2, 2014	Haleakala	Pan-STARRS 1	·	1.2 km	MPC · JPL
890729	2014 LP_{38}	—	June 4, 2014	Haleakala	Pan-STARRS 1	H	380 m	MPC · JPL
890730	2014 LT_{38}	—	June 4, 2014	Haleakala	Pan-STARRS 1	H	300 m	MPC · JPL
890731	2014 LH_{40}	—	June 5, 2014	Haleakala	Pan-STARRS 1	·	1.3 km	MPC · JPL
890732	2014 LU_{40}	—	June 6, 2014	Haleakala	Pan-STARRS 1	·	620 m	MPC · JPL
890733	2014 MV	—	May 24, 2014	Haleakala	Pan-STARRS 1	H	410 m	MPC · JPL
890734	2014 MO_{3}	—	May 23, 2014	Haleakala	Pan-STARRS 1	·	1.1 km	MPC · JPL
890735	2014 MY_{4}	—	June 21, 2014	Mount Lemmon	Mount Lemmon Survey	H	360 m	MPC · JPL
890736	2014 MH_{16}	—	May 28, 2014	Haleakala	Pan-STARRS 1	·	980 m	MPC · JPL
890737	2014 MH_{25}	—	June 20, 2014	Haleakala	Pan-STARRS 1	PHO	740 m	MPC · JPL
890738	2014 MG_{27}	—	November 3, 2007	Mount Lemmon	Mount Lemmon Survey	H	340 m	MPC · JPL
890739	2014 MN_{33}	—	June 4, 2014	Haleakala	Pan-STARRS 1	·	1.0 km	MPC · JPL
890740	2014 MJ_{47}	—	March 12, 2014	Haleakala	Pan-STARRS 1	·	920 m	MPC · JPL
890741	2014 ME_{58}	—	June 27, 2014	Haleakala	Pan-STARRS 1	·	800 m	MPC · JPL
890742	2014 MW_{75}	—	February 15, 2013	Haleakala	Pan-STARRS 1	·	1.3 km	MPC · JPL
890743	2014 ML_{76}	—	June 27, 2014	Haleakala	Pan-STARRS 1	EUN	850 m	MPC · JPL
890744	2014 MY_{79}	—	June 18, 2014	Haleakala	Pan-STARRS 1	·	550 m	MPC · JPL
890745	2014 ME_{83}	—	June 24, 2014	Haleakala	Pan-STARRS 1	(1547)	850 m	MPC · JPL
890746	2014 MM_{84}	—	November 18, 2015	Haleakala	Pan-STARRS 1	BRG	1.2 km	MPC · JPL
890747	2014 MR_{90}	—	June 29, 2014	Haleakala	Pan-STARRS 1	·	1.6 km	MPC · JPL
890748	2014 MZ_{93}	—	June 18, 2014	Mount Lemmon	Mount Lemmon Survey	·	910 m	MPC · JPL
890749	2014 MC_{103}	—	June 24, 2014	Haleakala	Pan-STARRS 1	EUN	840 m	MPC · JPL
890750	2014 MX_{105}	—	June 24, 2014	Mount Lemmon	Mount Lemmon Survey	·	1.5 km	MPC · JPL
890751	2014 NP	—	June 6, 2014	Haleakala	Pan-STARRS 1	·	750 m	MPC · JPL
890752	2014 NS_{3}	—	June 1, 2014	Haleakala	Pan-STARRS 1	·	970 m	MPC · JPL
890753	2014 NC_{12}	—	June 4, 2014	Haleakala	Pan-STARRS 1	H	430 m	MPC · JPL
890754	2014 NO_{15}	—	December 21, 2012	Mount Lemmon	Mount Lemmon Survey	·	1.5 km	MPC · JPL
890755	2014 NO_{19}	—	December 8, 2012	Mount Lemmon	Mount Lemmon Survey	H	360 m	MPC · JPL
890756	2014 ND_{21}	—	August 22, 2004	Kitt Peak	Spacewatch	·	1.3 km	MPC · JPL
890757	2014 NV_{24}	—	May 31, 2014	Haleakala	Pan-STARRS 1	·	890 m	MPC · JPL
890758	2014 NF_{27}	—	July 2, 2014	Haleakala	Pan-STARRS 1	·	970 m	MPC · JPL
890759	2014 NO_{39}	—	June 3, 2014	Haleakala	Pan-STARRS 1	·	600 m	MPC · JPL
890760	2014 NO_{44}	—	July 3, 2014	Haleakala	Pan-STARRS 1	H	330 m	MPC · JPL
890761	2014 NN_{52}	—	July 2, 2014	Haleakala	Pan-STARRS 1	·	730 m	MPC · JPL
890762	2014 NC_{57}	—	May 25, 2009	Kitt Peak	Spacewatch	·	1.3 km	MPC · JPL
890763	2014 NQ_{62}	—	June 7, 2014	Haleakala	Pan-STARRS 1	·	1.3 km	MPC · JPL
890764	2014 NH_{67}	—	July 7, 2014	Haleakala	Pan-STARRS 1	·	1.1 km	MPC · JPL
890765	2014 NZ_{71}	—	November 13, 2010	Mount Lemmon	Mount Lemmon Survey	·	1.4 km	MPC · JPL
890766	2014 NF_{78}	—	July 8, 2014	Haleakala	Pan-STARRS 1	·	1.8 km	MPC · JPL
890767	2014 NY_{83}	—	July 4, 2014	Haleakala	Pan-STARRS 1	EOS	1.4 km	MPC · JPL
890768	2014 NB_{87}	—	July 2, 2014	Haleakala	Pan-STARRS 1	·	460 m	MPC · JPL
890769	2014 OO_{7}	—	October 24, 2011	Haleakala	Pan-STARRS 1	·	510 m	MPC · JPL
890770	2014 OV_{7}	—	October 5, 2004	Kitt Peak	Spacewatch	·	500 m	MPC · JPL
890771	2014 OH_{8}	—	May 7, 2014	Haleakala	Pan-STARRS 1	EUN	950 m	MPC · JPL
890772	2014 OU_{24}	—	October 9, 2008	Mount Lemmon	Mount Lemmon Survey	·	440 m	MPC · JPL
890773	2014 OL_{25}	—	July 25, 2014	Haleakala	Pan-STARRS 1	·	680 m	MPC · JPL
890774	2014 ON_{36}	—	July 3, 2014	Haleakala	Pan-STARRS 1	·	1.7 km	MPC · JPL
890775	2014 OQ_{37}	—	September 13, 2007	Mount Lemmon	Mount Lemmon Survey	·	680 m	MPC · JPL
890776	2014 OO_{54}	—	July 25, 2014	Haleakala	Pan-STARRS 1	·	800 m	MPC · JPL
890777	2014 OP_{55}	—	June 29, 2014	Haleakala	Pan-STARRS 1	·	1.6 km	MPC · JPL
890778	2014 OC_{58}	—	June 1, 2005	Kitt Peak	Spacewatch	·	1.1 km	MPC · JPL
890779	2014 OQ_{61}	—	July 25, 2014	Haleakala	Pan-STARRS 1	·	1.1 km	MPC · JPL
890780	2014 OF_{69}	—	July 25, 2014	Haleakala	Pan-STARRS 1	V	370 m	MPC · JPL
890781	2014 OM_{70}	—	July 25, 2014	Haleakala	Pan-STARRS 1	·	1.6 km	MPC · JPL
890782	2014 OR_{70}	—	September 4, 2011	Haleakala	Pan-STARRS 1	·	490 m	MPC · JPL
890783	2014 OO_{72}	—	July 25, 2014	Haleakala	Pan-STARRS 1	·	1.8 km	MPC · JPL
890784	2014 OQ_{78}	—	January 1, 2009	Mount Lemmon	Mount Lemmon Survey	·	440 m	MPC · JPL
890785	2014 OK_{101}	—	July 26, 2014	Haleakala	Pan-STARRS 1	H	320 m	MPC · JPL
890786	2014 OR_{107}	—	November 30, 2011	Mount Lemmon	Mount Lemmon Survey	·	540 m	MPC · JPL
890787	2014 OB_{123}	—	October 8, 2008	Mount Lemmon	Mount Lemmon Survey	·	390 m	MPC · JPL
890788	2014 OS_{133}	—	July 27, 2014	Haleakala	Pan-STARRS 1	·	1.9 km	MPC · JPL
890789	2014 OY_{139}	—	June 27, 2014	Haleakala	Pan-STARRS 1	·	1.8 km	MPC · JPL
890790	2014 OR_{142}	—	June 27, 2014	Haleakala	Pan-STARRS 1	AGN	920 m	MPC · JPL
890791	2014 OV_{142}	—	October 30, 2007	Mount Lemmon	Mount Lemmon Survey	MAS	490 m	MPC · JPL
890792	2014 OG_{143}	—	July 27, 2014	Haleakala	Pan-STARRS 1	·	600 m	MPC · JPL
890793	2014 OY_{147}	—	September 4, 2007	Catalina	CSS	NYS	580 m	MPC · JPL
890794	2014 OU_{148}	—	September 10, 2007	Mount Lemmon	Mount Lemmon Survey	MAS	370 m	MPC · JPL
890795	2014 OE_{158}	—	July 27, 2014	Haleakala	Pan-STARRS 1	·	1.1 km	MPC · JPL
890796	2014 OQ_{163}	—	July 27, 2014	Haleakala	Pan-STARRS 1	·	2.0 km	MPC · JPL
890797	2014 OW_{173}	—	October 13, 2007	Lulin	LUSS	·	680 m	MPC · JPL
890798	2014 OA_{187}	—	July 27, 2014	Haleakala	Pan-STARRS 1	H	330 m	MPC · JPL
890799	2014 OX_{189}	—	July 27, 2014	Haleakala	Pan-STARRS 1	·	680 m	MPC · JPL
890800	2014 OK_{205}	—	November 18, 2008	Kitt Peak	Spacewatch	·	540 m	MPC · JPL

== 890801–890900 ==
back to top

Designation			Discovery			Properties		Ref
Permanent	Provisional	Named after	Date	Site	Discoverer(s)	Category	Diam.	Ref
890801	2014 OS_{207}	—	July 25, 2014	Haleakala	Pan-STARRS 1	H	280 m	MPC · JPL
890802	2014 OU_{207}	—	July 29, 2014	Haleakala	Pan-STARRS 1	H	280 m	MPC · JPL
890803	2014 OG_{210}	—	July 25, 2014	Haleakala	Pan-STARRS 1	·	1.6 km	MPC · JPL
890804	2014 OY_{210}	—	July 25, 2014	Haleakala	Pan-STARRS 1	·	1.2 km	MPC · JPL
890805	2014 OY_{215}	—	July 27, 2014	Haleakala	Pan-STARRS 1	·	1.6 km	MPC · JPL
890806	2014 OX_{220}	—	June 29, 2014	Haleakala	Pan-STARRS 1	·	1.0 km	MPC · JPL
890807	2014 OO_{226}	—	July 27, 2014	Haleakala	Pan-STARRS 1	·	500 m	MPC · JPL
890808	2014 OQ_{249}	—	March 19, 2013	Haleakala	Pan-STARRS 1	·	1.2 km	MPC · JPL
890809	2014 OL_{255}	—	July 29, 2014	Haleakala	Pan-STARRS 1	·	1.7 km	MPC · JPL
890810	2014 OX_{264}	—	April 17, 2005	Kitt Peak	Spacewatch	·	990 m	MPC · JPL
890811	2014 OF_{279}	—	June 6, 2005	Kitt Peak	Spacewatch	·	940 m	MPC · JPL
890812	2014 OW_{283}	—	July 29, 2014	Haleakala	Pan-STARRS 1	·	1.6 km	MPC · JPL
890813	2014 OE_{288}	—	August 15, 2009	Kitt Peak	Spacewatch	H	310 m	MPC · JPL
890814	2014 OW_{293}	—	February 11, 2011	Mount Lemmon	Mount Lemmon Survey	·	1.6 km	MPC · JPL
890815	2014 OL_{311}	—	July 27, 2014	Haleakala	Pan-STARRS 1	HOF	1.8 km	MPC · JPL
890816	2014 OL_{315}	—	September 28, 2003	Kitt Peak	Spacewatch	NYS	780 m	MPC · JPL
890817	2014 OA_{319}	—	December 27, 2011	Mount Lemmon	Mount Lemmon Survey	·	1.5 km	MPC · JPL
890818	2014 OO_{330}	—	July 29, 2014	Haleakala	Pan-STARRS 1	·	1.3 km	MPC · JPL
890819	2014 OH_{331}	—	July 25, 2014	Haleakala	Pan-STARRS 1	·	450 m	MPC · JPL
890820	2014 OF_{335}	—	July 25, 2014	Haleakala	Pan-STARRS 1	·	950 m	MPC · JPL
890821	2014 OX_{346}	—	July 4, 2014	Haleakala	Pan-STARRS 1	HYG	1.7 km	MPC · JPL
890822	2014 OQ_{354}	—	July 28, 2014	Haleakala	Pan-STARRS 1	·	1.5 km	MPC · JPL
890823	2014 OW_{356}	—	July 28, 2014	Haleakala	Pan-STARRS 1	·	420 m	MPC · JPL
890824	2014 OP_{357}	—	July 28, 2014	Haleakala	Pan-STARRS 1	NYS	650 m	MPC · JPL
890825	2014 OY_{363}	—	July 29, 2014	Haleakala	Pan-STARRS 1	·	1.4 km	MPC · JPL
890826	2014 OR_{365}	—	July 30, 2014	Haleakala	Pan-STARRS 1	·	450 m	MPC · JPL
890827	2014 OU_{366}	—	July 25, 2014	Haleakala	Pan-STARRS 1	·	1.2 km	MPC · JPL
890828	2014 OA_{369}	—	July 27, 2014	Haleakala	Pan-STARRS 1	·	1.6 km	MPC · JPL
890829	2014 OQ_{383}	—	June 29, 2014	Haleakala	Pan-STARRS 1	H	320 m	MPC · JPL
890830	2014 OE_{386}	—	June 1, 2014	Haleakala	Pan-STARRS 1	H	320 m	MPC · JPL
890831	2014 OV_{393}	—	July 28, 2014	Haleakala	Pan-STARRS 1	·	261 km	MPC · JPL
890832	2014 OX_{394}	—	January 7, 2013	Mount Lemmon	Mount Lemmon Survey	H	290 m	MPC · JPL
890833	2014 OO_{395}	—	July 29, 2014	Haleakala	Pan-STARRS 1	H	340 m	MPC · JPL
890834	2014 OP_{397}	—	July 28, 2014	Haleakala	Pan-STARRS 1	·	2.1 km	MPC · JPL
890835	2014 OY_{398}	—	July 25, 2014	Haleakala	Pan-STARRS 1	KOR	920 m	MPC · JPL
890836	2014 OP_{407}	—	October 18, 2006	Kitt Peak	Spacewatch	·	870 m	MPC · JPL
890837	2014 OE_{409}	—	September 19, 2003	Kitt Peak	Spacewatch	·	1.8 km	MPC · JPL
890838	2014 OR_{410}	—	September 2, 2010	Mount Lemmon	Mount Lemmon Survey	·	960 m	MPC · JPL
890839	2014 OS_{410}	—	July 28, 2014	Haleakala	Pan-STARRS 1	HOF	1.7 km	MPC · JPL
890840	2014 OU_{414}	—	July 31, 2014	Haleakala	Pan-STARRS 1	·	1.4 km	MPC · JPL
890841	2014 OK_{418}	—	July 25, 2014	Haleakala	Pan-STARRS 1	·	460 m	MPC · JPL
890842	2014 OG_{424}	—	July 28, 2014	Haleakala	Pan-STARRS 1	LIX	1.8 km	MPC · JPL
890843	2014 OR_{429}	—	July 27, 2014	Haleakala	Pan-STARRS 1	·	1.1 km	MPC · JPL
890844	2014 OA_{430}	—	July 28, 2014	Haleakala	Pan-STARRS 1	·	1.3 km	MPC · JPL
890845	2014 OC_{431}	—	June 6, 2014	La Palma	EURONEAR	·	1.3 km	MPC · JPL
890846	2014 OJ_{433}	—	July 25, 2014	Haleakala	Pan-STARRS 1	·	1.1 km	MPC · JPL
890847	2014 OD_{434}	—	July 25, 2014	Haleakala	Pan-STARRS 1	·	1.3 km	MPC · JPL
890848	2014 OB_{436}	—	July 31, 2014	Haleakala	Pan-STARRS 1	JUN	740 m	MPC · JPL
890849	2014 OU_{436}	—	July 25, 2014	Haleakala	Pan-STARRS 1	KOR	950 m	MPC · JPL
890850	2014 ON_{438}	—	July 25, 2014	Haleakala	Pan-STARRS 1	·	1.6 km	MPC · JPL
890851	2014 OM_{440}	—	July 30, 2014	Haleakala	Pan-STARRS 1	·	1.7 km	MPC · JPL
890852	2014 OR_{442}	—	July 31, 2014	Haleakala	Pan-STARRS 1	·	1.9 km	MPC · JPL
890853	2014 OB_{443}	—	July 25, 2014	Haleakala	Pan-STARRS 1	THM	1.4 km	MPC · JPL
890854	2014 OE_{447}	—	July 26, 2014	Haleakala	Pan-STARRS 1	·	800 m	MPC · JPL
890855	2014 OP_{452}	—	July 30, 2014	Haleakala	Pan-STARRS 1	THM	1.7 km	MPC · JPL
890856	2014 OT_{454}	—	July 30, 2014	Haleakala	Pan-STARRS 1	·	1.4 km	MPC · JPL
890857	2014 OU_{459}	—	July 31, 2014	Haleakala	Pan-STARRS 1	·	510 m	MPC · JPL
890858	2014 OS_{462}	—	July 27, 2014	Haleakala	Pan-STARRS 1	TIR	1.6 km	MPC · JPL
890859	2014 OY_{463}	—	July 29, 2014	Haleakala	Pan-STARRS 1	H	320 m	MPC · JPL
890860	2014 ON_{485}	—	July 25, 2014	Haleakala	Pan-STARRS 1	·	1.4 km	MPC · JPL
890861	2014 OY_{488}	—	July 28, 2014	Haleakala	Pan-STARRS 1	·	1.4 km	MPC · JPL
890862	2014 OD_{489}	—	July 30, 2014	Haleakala	Pan-STARRS 1	·	1.2 km	MPC · JPL
890863	2014 PM_{11}	—	April 27, 2009	Kitt Peak	Spacewatch	·	1.2 km	MPC · JPL
890864	2014 PB_{18}	—	July 28, 2014	ESA OGS	ESA OGS	·	1.3 km	MPC · JPL
890865	2014 PR_{18}	—	February 14, 2013	Kitt Peak	Spacewatch	ADE	1.3 km	MPC · JPL
890866	2014 PY_{25}	—	August 4, 2014	Haleakala	Pan-STARRS 1	H	350 m	MPC · JPL
890867	2014 PU_{33}	—	July 25, 2014	Haleakala	Pan-STARRS 1	·	490 m	MPC · JPL
890868	2014 PH_{40}	—	August 4, 2014	Haleakala	Pan-STARRS 1	·	660 m	MPC · JPL
890869	2014 PH_{43}	—	August 4, 2014	Haleakala	Pan-STARRS 1	H	330 m	MPC · JPL
890870	2014 PU_{51}	—	August 3, 2014	Haleakala	Pan-STARRS 1	(1547)	1.0 km	MPC · JPL
890871	2014 PV_{62}	—	July 25, 2014	Haleakala	Pan-STARRS 1	NYS	670 m	MPC · JPL
890872	2014 PW_{70}	—	January 10, 2008	Mount Lemmon	Mount Lemmon Survey	H	370 m	MPC · JPL
890873	2014 PZ_{70}	—	August 3, 2014	Haleakala	Pan-STARRS 1	H	310 m	MPC · JPL
890874	2014 PC_{72}	—	August 3, 2014	Haleakala	Pan-STARRS 1	KOR	850 m	MPC · JPL
890875	2014 PW_{74}	—	September 22, 2009	Kitt Peak	Spacewatch	HYG	1.4 km	MPC · JPL
890876	2014 PV_{76}	—	August 3, 2014	Haleakala	Pan-STARRS 1	·	490 m	MPC · JPL
890877	2014 PU_{90}	—	August 3, 2014	Haleakala	Pan-STARRS 1	·	1.9 km	MPC · JPL
890878	2014 PG_{93}	—	August 3, 2014	Haleakala	Pan-STARRS 1	·	960 m	MPC · JPL
890879	2014 PT_{95}	—	August 3, 2014	Haleakala	Pan-STARRS 1	PHO	470 m	MPC · JPL
890880	2014 PQ_{96}	—	August 3, 2014	Haleakala	Pan-STARRS 1	AGN	910 m	MPC · JPL
890881	2014 PA_{101}	—	August 3, 2014	Haleakala	Pan-STARRS 1	·	1.6 km	MPC · JPL
890882	2014 PA_{102}	—	August 15, 2014	Haleakala	Pan-STARRS 1	·	1.3 km	MPC · JPL
890883	2014 PF_{103}	—	August 15, 2014	Haleakala	Pan-STARRS 1	·	1.2 km	MPC · JPL
890884	2014 QQ_{3}	—	July 25, 2014	Haleakala	Pan-STARRS 1	·	2.0 km	MPC · JPL
890885	2014 QH_{9}	—	June 3, 2014	Haleakala	Pan-STARRS 1	·	820 m	MPC · JPL
890886	2014 QE_{27}	—	August 18, 2014	Haleakala	Pan-STARRS 1	·	760 m	MPC · JPL
890887	2014 QT_{41}	—	August 19, 2014	Haleakala	Pan-STARRS 1	·	2.2 km	MPC · JPL
890888	2014 QY_{43}	—	July 2, 2014	Haleakala	Pan-STARRS 1	·	1.7 km	MPC · JPL
890889	2014 QB_{65}	—	July 7, 2014	Haleakala	Pan-STARRS 1	·	1.2 km	MPC · JPL
890890	2014 QO_{65}	—	August 20, 2014	Haleakala	Pan-STARRS 1	·	930 m	MPC · JPL
890891	2014 QF_{72}	—	July 1, 2014	Haleakala	Pan-STARRS 1	·	2.4 km	MPC · JPL
890892	2014 QS_{106}	—	February 8, 2013	Haleakala	Pan-STARRS 1	·	440 m	MPC · JPL
890893	2014 QR_{117}	—	August 20, 2014	Haleakala	Pan-STARRS 1	·	560 m	MPC · JPL
890894	2014 QV_{117}	—	August 20, 2014	Haleakala	Pan-STARRS 1	·	1.3 km	MPC · JPL
890895	2014 QR_{131}	—	August 20, 2014	Haleakala	Pan-STARRS 1	·	1.2 km	MPC · JPL
890896	2014 QO_{144}	—	August 3, 2014	Haleakala	Pan-STARRS 1	·	1.5 km	MPC · JPL
890897	2014 QH_{146}	—	July 28, 2014	Haleakala	Pan-STARRS 1	EUN	820 m	MPC · JPL
890898	2014 QF_{148}	—	July 31, 2014	Haleakala	Pan-STARRS 1	BRA	940 m	MPC · JPL
890899	2014 QN_{150}	—	February 13, 2013	Haleakala	Pan-STARRS 1	(116763)	1.4 km	MPC · JPL
890900	2014 QW_{156}	—	August 22, 2014	Haleakala	Pan-STARRS 1	JUN	790 m	MPC · JPL

== 890901–891000 ==
back to top

Designation			Discovery			Properties		Ref
Permanent	Provisional	Named after	Date	Site	Discoverer(s)	Category	Diam.	Ref
890901	2014 QT_{161}	—	July 29, 2014	Haleakala	Pan-STARRS 1	·	2.1 km	MPC · JPL
890902	2014 QT_{175}	—	August 3, 2014	Haleakala	Pan-STARRS 1	·	1.5 km	MPC · JPL
890903	2014 QY_{179}	—	August 21, 2014	Haleakala	Pan-STARRS 1	·	510 m	MPC · JPL
890904	2014 QT_{188}	—	August 22, 2014	Haleakala	Pan-STARRS 1	·	2.0 km	MPC · JPL
890905	2014 QR_{195}	—	August 22, 2014	Haleakala	Pan-STARRS 1	·	410 m	MPC · JPL
890906	2014 QE_{207}	—	April 17, 2013	Haleakala	Pan-STARRS 1	GEF	850 m	MPC · JPL
890907	2014 QT_{212}	—	August 3, 2014	Haleakala	Pan-STARRS 1	·	1.8 km	MPC · JPL
890908	2014 QT_{213}	—	August 22, 2014	Haleakala	Pan-STARRS 1	AGN	770 m	MPC · JPL
890909	2014 QV_{231}	—	August 22, 2014	Haleakala	Pan-STARRS 1	·	1.4 km	MPC · JPL
890910	2014 QU_{234}	—	June 3, 2005	Kitt Peak	Spacewatch	·	860 m	MPC · JPL
890911	2014 QP_{236}	—	November 25, 2005	Kitt Peak	Spacewatch	KOR	950 m	MPC · JPL
890912	2014 QM_{243}	—	August 22, 2014	Haleakala	Pan-STARRS 1	·	1.7 km	MPC · JPL
890913	2014 QR_{244}	—	August 22, 2014	Haleakala	Pan-STARRS 1	·	520 m	MPC · JPL
890914	2014 QK_{252}	—	August 22, 2014	Haleakala	Pan-STARRS 1	·	1.5 km	MPC · JPL
890915	2014 QJ_{261}	—	August 22, 2014	Haleakala	Pan-STARRS 1	T_{j} (2.99) · EUP	1.8 km	MPC · JPL
890916	2014 QT_{264}	—	August 22, 2014	Haleakala	Pan-STARRS 1	H	380 m	MPC · JPL
890917	2014 QO_{269}	—	August 20, 2014	Haleakala	Pan-STARRS 1	·	670 m	MPC · JPL
890918	2014 QC_{281}	—	June 29, 2014	Haleakala	Pan-STARRS 1	·	550 m	MPC · JPL
890919	2014 QP_{299}	—	August 20, 2014	Haleakala	Pan-STARRS 1	·	780 m	MPC · JPL
890920	2014 QZ_{301}	—	July 31, 2014	Haleakala	Pan-STARRS 1	·	810 m	MPC · JPL
890921	2014 QO_{305}	—	July 7, 2014	Haleakala	Pan-STARRS 1	NYS	790 m	MPC · JPL
890922	2014 QY_{317}	—	July 28, 2014	Haleakala	Pan-STARRS 1	·	1.3 km	MPC · JPL
890923	2014 QD_{355}	—	September 18, 1999	Kitt Peak	Spacewatch	·	730 m	MPC · JPL
890924	2014 QF_{363}	—	July 5, 2014	Haleakala	Pan-STARRS 1	H	350 m	MPC · JPL
890925	2014 QP_{391}	—	August 28, 2014	Haleakala	Pan-STARRS 1	H	260 m	MPC · JPL
890926	2014 QP_{430}	—	August 3, 2014	Haleakala	Pan-STARRS 1	H	330 m	MPC · JPL
890927	2014 QF_{433}	—	August 25, 2014	Haleakala	Pan-STARRS 1	·	260 km	MPC · JPL
890928	2014 QU_{443}	—	August 25, 2014	Haleakala	Pan-STARRS 1	H	340 m	MPC · JPL
890929	2014 QV_{443}	—	January 17, 2013	Kitt Peak	Spacewatch	H	340 m	MPC · JPL
890930	2014 QN_{444}	—	August 20, 2014	Haleakala	Pan-STARRS 1	·	2.0 km	MPC · JPL
890931	2014 QR_{444}	—	August 20, 2014	Haleakala	Pan-STARRS 1	·	1.2 km	MPC · JPL
890932	2014 QT_{446}	—	August 27, 2014	Haleakala	Pan-STARRS 1	·	2.3 km	MPC · JPL
890933	2014 QH_{447}	—	August 31, 2014	Haleakala	Pan-STARRS 1	·	870 m	MPC · JPL
890934	2014 QO_{466}	—	February 20, 2009	Kitt Peak	Spacewatch	·	740 m	MPC · JPL
890935	2014 QR_{468}	—	January 29, 2011	Mount Lemmon	Mount Lemmon Survey	KOR	920 m	MPC · JPL
890936	2014 QY_{486}	—	August 21, 2014	Haleakala	Pan-STARRS 1	·	1.3 km	MPC · JPL
890937	2014 QZ_{489}	—	August 22, 2014	Haleakala	Pan-STARRS 1	·	2.0 km	MPC · JPL
890938	2014 QS_{496}	—	August 28, 2014	Haleakala	Pan-STARRS 1	·	1.4 km	MPC · JPL
890939	2014 QY_{496}	—	August 25, 2014	Haleakala	Pan-STARRS 1	·	2.1 km	MPC · JPL
890940	2014 QQ_{498}	—	August 27, 2014	Haleakala	Pan-STARRS 1	·	520 m	MPC · JPL
890941	2014 QH_{501}	—	August 31, 2014	Haleakala	Pan-STARRS 1	·	620 m	MPC · JPL
890942	2014 QV_{503}	—	August 28, 2014	Haleakala	Pan-STARRS 1	·	540 m	MPC · JPL
890943	2014 QR_{504}	—	August 20, 2014	Haleakala	Pan-STARRS 1	·	930 m	MPC · JPL
890944	2014 QF_{506}	—	August 22, 2014	Haleakala	Pan-STARRS 1	·	460 m	MPC · JPL
890945	2014 QP_{506}	—	August 28, 2014	Haleakala	Pan-STARRS 1	·	1.9 km	MPC · JPL
890946	2014 QX_{507}	—	August 25, 2014	Haleakala	Pan-STARRS 1	·	760 m	MPC · JPL
890947	2014 QP_{508}	—	August 23, 2014	Haleakala	Pan-STARRS 1	·	1.2 km	MPC · JPL
890948	2014 QK_{509}	—	August 27, 2014	Haleakala	Pan-STARRS 1	·	610 m	MPC · JPL
890949	2014 QJ_{512}	—	August 23, 2014	Haleakala	Pan-STARRS 1	·	1.5 km	MPC · JPL
890950	2014 QU_{513}	—	August 23, 2014	Haleakala	Pan-STARRS 1	·	1.4 km	MPC · JPL
890951	2014 QP_{517}	—	August 19, 2014	Haleakala	Pan-STARRS 1	·	590 m	MPC · JPL
890952	2014 QR_{517}	—	August 27, 2014	Haleakala	Pan-STARRS 1	KOR	830 m	MPC · JPL
890953	2014 QH_{518}	—	August 23, 2014	Haleakala	Pan-STARRS 1	·	450 m	MPC · JPL
890954	2014 QY_{518}	—	August 28, 2014	Haleakala	Pan-STARRS 1	·	640 m	MPC · JPL
890955	2014 QK_{520}	—	August 31, 2014	Haleakala	Pan-STARRS 1	·	1.3 km	MPC · JPL
890956	2014 QS_{522}	—	August 28, 2014	Haleakala	Pan-STARRS 1	·	660 m	MPC · JPL
890957	2014 QK_{528}	—	August 30, 2014	Mount Lemmon	Mount Lemmon Survey	·	440 m	MPC · JPL
890958	2014 QZ_{532}	—	August 22, 2014	Haleakala	Pan-STARRS 1	·	2.2 km	MPC · JPL
890959	2014 QL_{533}	—	August 19, 2014	Haleakala	Pan-STARRS 1	·	1.4 km	MPC · JPL
890960	2014 QD_{547}	—	August 25, 2014	Haleakala	Pan-STARRS 1	H	420 m	MPC · JPL
890961	2014 QH_{547}	—	August 25, 2014	Haleakala	Pan-STARRS 1	H	310 m	MPC · JPL
890962	2014 QJ_{547}	—	August 23, 2014	Haleakala	Pan-STARRS 1	H	290 m	MPC · JPL
890963	2014 QC_{553}	—	August 30, 2014	Haleakala	Pan-STARRS 1	·	790 m	MPC · JPL
890964	2014 QA_{555}	—	August 23, 2014	Haleakala	Pan-STARRS 1	·	1.3 km	MPC · JPL
890965	2014 QF_{563}	—	August 27, 2014	Haleakala	Pan-STARRS 1	·	460 m	MPC · JPL
890966	2014 QJ_{563}	—	August 22, 2014	Haleakala	Pan-STARRS 1	·	1.8 km	MPC · JPL
890967	2014 QT_{565}	—	August 25, 2014	Haleakala	Pan-STARRS 1	·	490 m	MPC · JPL
890968	2014 QA_{570}	—	August 20, 2014	Haleakala	Pan-STARRS 1	BRA	930 m	MPC · JPL
890969	2014 QF_{575}	—	August 28, 2014	Haleakala	Pan-STARRS 1	JUN	780 m	MPC · JPL
890970	2014 QS_{575}	—	August 23, 2014	Haleakala	Pan-STARRS 1	·	1.3 km	MPC · JPL
890971	2014 QA_{577}	—	August 22, 2014	Haleakala	Pan-STARRS 1	·	1.0 km	MPC · JPL
890972	2014 QB_{614}	—	August 19, 2014	Haleakala	Pan-STARRS 1	·	1.6 km	MPC · JPL
890973	2014 QN_{614}	—	August 28, 2014	Haleakala	Pan-STARRS 1	·	1.1 km	MPC · JPL
890974	2014 RH_{8}	—	October 8, 2007	Mount Lemmon	Mount Lemmon Survey	MAS	470 m	MPC · JPL
890975	2014 RU_{11}	—	September 3, 2014	Mount Lemmon	Mount Lemmon Survey	H	370 m	MPC · JPL
890976	2014 RV_{13}	—	October 14, 2007	Catalina	CSS	·	750 m	MPC · JPL
890977	2014 RO_{18}	—	August 18, 2014	Haleakala	Pan-STARRS 1	H	320 m	MPC · JPL
890978	2014 RE_{54}	—	October 24, 2011	Haleakala	Pan-STARRS 1	·	490 m	MPC · JPL
890979	2014 RJ_{77}	—	September 2, 2014	Haleakala	Pan-STARRS 1	·	1.3 km	MPC · JPL
890980	2014 RQ_{78}	—	September 2, 2014	Kitt Peak	Spacewatch	·	440 m	MPC · JPL
890981	2014 RC_{80}	—	September 1, 2014	Mount Lemmon	Mount Lemmon Survey	·	1.4 km	MPC · JPL
890982	2014 RZ_{82}	—	September 6, 2014	Mount Lemmon	Mount Lemmon Survey	H	370 m	MPC · JPL
890983	2014 RW_{97}	—	September 2, 2014	Haleakala	Pan-STARRS 1	·	1.4 km	MPC · JPL
890984	2014 SG_{10}	—	October 5, 2005	Kitt Peak	Spacewatch	·	1.3 km	MPC · JPL
890985	2014 SQ_{21}	—	August 27, 2014	Haleakala	Pan-STARRS 1	NYS	660 m	MPC · JPL
890986	2014 SX_{22}	—	September 17, 2014	Haleakala	Pan-STARRS 1	·	1.2 km	MPC · JPL
890987	2014 SX_{24}	—	March 13, 2013	Haleakala	Pan-STARRS 1	·	1.3 km	MPC · JPL
890988	2014 SD_{25}	—	August 27, 2014	Haleakala	Pan-STARRS 1	·	410 m	MPC · JPL
890989	2014 SN_{27}	—	September 12, 2007	Mount Lemmon	Mount Lemmon Survey	·	680 m	MPC · JPL
890990	2014 SO_{37}	—	February 26, 2008	Mount Lemmon	Mount Lemmon Survey	(21344)	1.1 km	MPC · JPL
890991	2014 SR_{43}	—	August 23, 2014	Haleakala	Pan-STARRS 1	·	1.2 km	MPC · JPL
890992	2014 SL_{49}	—	August 3, 2014	Haleakala	Pan-STARRS 1	·	550 m	MPC · JPL
890993	2014 SB_{60}	—	October 23, 2011	Kitt Peak	Spacewatch	·	460 m	MPC · JPL
890994	2014 ST_{69}	—	November 18, 2007	Mount Lemmon	Mount Lemmon Survey	·	670 m	MPC · JPL
890995	2014 SD_{76}	—	September 18, 2014	Haleakala	Pan-STARRS 1	·	1.4 km	MPC · JPL
890996	2014 SW_{88}	—	August 27, 2014	Haleakala	Pan-STARRS 1	·	2.0 km	MPC · JPL
890997	2014 SQ_{92}	—	September 18, 2014	Haleakala	Pan-STARRS 1	·	660 m	MPC · JPL
890998	2014 SK_{96}	—	September 2, 2014	Haleakala	Pan-STARRS 1	·	1.4 km	MPC · JPL
890999	2014 SC_{99}	—	September 18, 2014	Haleakala	Pan-STARRS 1	·	490 m	MPC · JPL
891000	2014 SK_{110}	—	March 31, 2013	Mount Lemmon	Mount Lemmon Survey	·	470 m	MPC · JPL

back to top

== See also ==
- Meanings of minor-planet names: 890001–891000
