= List of unnumbered trans-Neptunian objects: 2025 =

The following is a partial list of unnumbered trans-Neptunian objects for principal designations assigned within 2025. As of November 2026, it contains a total of 1170 bodies. For more information see the description on the main page. Also see list for the previous and next year.

== 2025 ==
Designation	First Observed (discovered)		D (km)	Orbital description						Remarks	Refs
Designation	Date	Observer (Site)	D (km)	Class	a (AU)	e	i (°)	q (AU)	Q (AU)	Remarks	Refs
2025 BD_{4}	19 January 2025	Pan-STARRS 1 (F51)	52	centaur	73.3	0.84	10	11.7	135.0	albedo: 0.058	MPC; JPL
2025 BU_{10}	27 January 2025	Mt. Lemmon Survey (G96)	14	centaur	78.1	0.91	54	7.3	149.0	albedo: 0.058	MPC; JPL
2025 DB_{51}	25 February 2025	Kitt Peak-Bok (V00)	48	centaur	490.6	0.97	105	13.7	967.6	albedo: 0.058	MPC; JPL
2025 DZ_{48}	24 February 2025	Mt. Lemmon Survey (G96)	18	centaur	33.8	0.81	63	6.4	61.2	albedo: 0.058	MPC; JPL
2025 EA_{16}	10 March 2025	Cerro Tololo-DECam (W84)	—	—	40.6	0.04	14	38.9	42.3	—	MPC; JPL
2025 FU_{12}	22 March 2025	Pan-STARRS 2 (F52)	30	centaur	43.1	0.79	15	9.0	77.2	albedo: 0.058	MPC; JPL
2025 FX_{19}	30 March 2025	Pan-STARRS 1 (F51)	75	centaur	38.8	0.66	41	13.3	64.3	albedo: 0.058	MPC; JPL
2025 GG	2 April 2025	Pan-STARRS 1 (F51)	53	centaur	54.2	0.81	22	10.4	98.0	albedo: 0.058	MPC; JPL
2025 HB_{51}	22 April 2025	Simonyi Survey Telescope, Rubin Observatory (X05)	140	cubewano (hot)?	49.0	0.20	10	39.2	58.9	albedo: 0.079	MPC; JPL
2025 HC_{51}	28 April 2025	Simonyi Survey Telescope, Rubin Observatory (X05)	105	other TNO	48.6	0.15	4	41.1	56.0	albedo: 0.13	MPC; JPL
2025 HD_{51}	22 April 2025	Simonyi Survey Telescope, Rubin Observatory (X05)	88	other TNO	39.0	0.10	10	35.2	42.8	albedo: 0.13	MPC; JPL
2025 HE_{111}	—	—	—	—	43.4	0.14	14	37.5	49.4	—	MPC; JPL
2025 HF_{111}	—	—	—	—	69.0	0.52	5	33.2	104.7	—	MPC; JPL
2025 HF_{51}	28 April 2025	Simonyi Survey Telescope, Rubin Observatory (X05)	149	other TNO	42.0	0.20	11	33.6	50.5	albedo: 0.13	MPC; JPL
2025 HG_{111}	—	—	—	—	110.1	0.69	24	33.8	186.4	—	MPC; JPL
2025 HK_{110}	—	—	—	—	34.5	0.10	30	31.1	37.9	—	MPC; JPL
2025 HL_{110}	—	—	—	—	106.6	0.62	7	40.4	172.8	—	MPC; JPL
2025 HM_{110}	—	—	—	—	133.0	0.75	8	32.6	233.4	—	MPC; JPL
2025 HM_{52}	25 April 2025	Subaru Telescope, Maunakea (T09)	217	other TNO	38.0	0.10	21	34.2	41.7	albedo: 0.13	MPC; JPL
2025 HN_{52}	25 April 2025	Subaru Telescope, Maunakea (T09)	152	cubewano (cold)?	47.4	0.10	3	42.6	52.3	albedo: 0.152	MPC; JPL
2025 HO_{52}	25 April 2025	Subaru Telescope, Maunakea (T09)	134	SDO	69.9	0.44	16	39.4	100.4	albedo: 0.124	MPC; JPL
2025 HP_{52}	25 April 2025	Subaru Telescope, Maunakea (T09)	142	other TNO	50.7	0.10	9	45.6	55.7	albedo: 0.13	MPC; JPL
2025 HU_{113}	—	—	—	—	46.75	0.19	19.1	37.97	55.54	—	MPC; JPL
2025 JD_{13}	—	—	—	—	55.1	0.32	23	37.7	72.5	—	MPC; JPL
2025 JG_{13}	—	—	—	—	57.4	0.40	27	34.5	80.2	—	MPC; JPL
2025 JJ_{12}	—	—	—	—	47.8	0.18	21	39.3	56.2	—	MPC; JPL
2025 JK_{12}	—	—	—	—	42.9	0.15	22	36.4	49.5	—	MPC; JPL
2025 KA_{59}	—	—	—	—	41.5	0.10	10	37.4	45.7	—	MPC; JPL
2025 KB_{59}	—	—	—	—	73.3	0.53	24	34.7	111.9	—	MPC; JPL
2025 KC_{59}	—	—	—	—	51.2	0.30	2	35.9	66.5	—	MPC; JPL
2025 KD_{59}	—	—	—	—	40.5	0.36	4	25.8	55.2	—	MPC; JPL
2025 KE_{59}	—	—	—	—	102.8	0.67	20	34.2	171.4	—	MPC; JPL
2025 KF_{59}	—	—	—	—	51.5	0.37	20	32.3	70.8	—	MPC; JPL
2025 KF_{65}	—	—	—	—	56.5	0.45	8	30.8	82.1	—	MPC; JPL
2025 KG_{59}	—	—	—	—	43.7	0.22	4	33.9	53.5	—	MPC; JPL
2025 KG_{64}	—	—	—	—	40.4	0.21	6	32.1	48.7	—	MPC; JPL
2025 KG_{65}	—	—	—	—	43.4	0.01	1	42.8	44.0	—	MPC; JPL
2025 KH_{59}	—	—	—	—	41.7	0.30	20	29.4	54.1	—	MPC; JPL
2025 KH_{64}	—	—	—	—	47.8	0.24	4	36.4	59.2	—	MPC; JPL
2025 KH_{65}	—	—	—	—	39.9	0.35	3	25.9	53.9	—	MPC; JPL
2025 KJ_{59}	—	—	—	—	42.1	0.13	5	36.6	47.6	—	MPC; JPL
2025 KJ_{64}	—	—	—	—	43.8	0.11	10	39.1	48.6	—	MPC; JPL
2025 KK_{64}	—	—	—	—	43.0	0.06	2	40.6	45.4	—	MPC; JPL
2025 KU_{31}	29 May 2025	Simonyi Survey Telescope, Rubin Observatory (X05)	—	—	42.5	0.13	4	36.8	48.2	—	MPC; JPL
2025 KV_{31}	31 May 2025	Simonyi Survey Telescope, Rubin Observatory (X05)	—	—	44.2	0.22	6	34.3	54.1	—	MPC; JPL
2025 KV_{58}	—	—	—	—	54.7	0.39	2	33.3	76.2	—	MPC; JPL
2025 KW_{31}	28 May 2025	Simonyi Survey Telescope, Rubin Observatory (X05)	—	—	45.6	0.14	2	39.4	51.8	—	MPC; JPL
2025 KW_{58}	—	—	—	—	47.3	0.27	20	34.7	60.0	—	MPC; JPL
2025 KX_{58}	—	—	—	—	40.6	0.10	19	36.5	44.7	—	MPC; JPL
2025 KY_{58}	—	—	—	—	45.6	0.16	8	38.1	53.1	—	MPC; JPL
2025 KZ_{58}	—	—	—	—	48.4	0.23	5	37.0	59.7	—	MPC; JPL
2025 LA_{3}	5 June 2025	Simonyi Survey Telescope, Rubin Observatory (X05)	—	—	39.0	0.16	7	32.6	45.4	—	MPC; JPL
2025 LA_{7}	—	—	—	—	43.4	0.06	1	40.7	46.1	—	MPC; JPL
2025 LA_{8}	—	—	—	—	39.0	0.21	15	30.7	47.4	—	MPC; JPL
2025 LB_{3}	5 June 2025	Simonyi Survey Telescope, Rubin Observatory (X05)	—	—	43.7	0.03	3	42.4	45.1	—	MPC; JPL
2025 LB_{7}	—	—	—	—	34.8	0.13	2	30.4	39.2	—	MPC; JPL
2025 LB_{8}	—	—	—	—	35.0	0.06	5	32.8	37.1	—	MPC; JPL
2025 LC_{3}	5 June 2025	Simonyi Survey Telescope, Rubin Observatory (X05)	—	—	42.4	0.03	9	40.9	43.8	—	MPC; JPL
2025 LC_{7}	—	—	—	—	39.2	0.20	4	31.4	46.9	—	MPC; JPL
2025 LC_{8}	—	—	—	—	44.8	0.08	2	41.4	48.3	—	MPC; JPL
2025 LD_{3}	5 June 2025	Simonyi Survey Telescope, Rubin Observatory (X05)	—	—	94.5	0.64	4	34.2	154.8	—	MPC; JPL
2025 LD_{7}	—	—	—	—	43.3	0.03	3	41.9	44.7	—	MPC; JPL
2025 LD_{8}	—	—	—	—	58.8	0.38	5	36.3	81.3	—	MPC; JPL
2025 LE_{2}	5 June 2025	Simonyi Survey Telescope, Rubin Observatory (X05)	—	—	43.6	0.03	3	42.3	44.9	—	MPC; JPL
2025 LE_{3}	9 June 2025	Simonyi Survey Telescope, Rubin Observatory (X05)	—	—	50.6	0.31	19	35.2	66.0	—	MPC; JPL
2025 LE_{6}	—	—	—	—	47.2	0.20	4	37.7	56.6	—	MPC; JPL
2025 LE_{7}	—	—	—	—	39.2	0.19	23	31.7	46.7	—	MPC; JPL
2025 LE_{8}	—	—	—	—	36.4	0.11	2	32.5	40.4	—	MPC; JPL
2025 LF_{2}	5 June 2025	Simonyi Survey Telescope, Rubin Observatory (X05)	—	—	43.2	0.23	2	33.1	53.2	—	MPC; JPL
2025 LF_{3}	5 June 2025	Simonyi Survey Telescope, Rubin Observatory (X05)	—	—	60.7	0.40	10	36.5	84.8	—	MPC; JPL
2025 LF_{6}	—	—	—	—	51.7	0.43	3	29.2	74.2	—	MPC; JPL
2025 LF_{7}	—	—	—	—	54.1	0.30	12	37.7	70.6	—	MPC; JPL
2025 LF_{8}	—	—	—	—	41.2	0.06	32	38.6	43.7	—	MPC; JPL
2025 LG_{2}	5 June 2025	Simonyi Survey Telescope, Rubin Observatory (X05)	—	—	43.4	0.25	3	32.4	54.4	—	MPC; JPL
2025 LG_{3}	5 June 2025	Simonyi Survey Telescope, Rubin Observatory (X05)	—	—	44.0	0.04	3	42.5	45.5	—	MPC; JPL
2025 LG_{6}	—	—	—	—	60.0	0.40	9	36.1	83.8	—	MPC; JPL
2025 LG_{7}	—	—	—	—	49.6	0.32	1	33.7	65.4	—	MPC; JPL
2025 LG_{8}	—	—	—	—	47.7	0.28	12	34.3	61.1	—	MPC; JPL
2025 LH_{2}	5 June 2025	Simonyi Survey Telescope, Rubin Observatory (X05)	—	—	39.1	0.17	11	32.4	45.8	—	MPC; JPL
2025 LH_{3}	5 June 2025	Simonyi Survey Telescope, Rubin Observatory (X05)	—	—	40.6	0.05	23	38.5	42.8	—	MPC; JPL
2025 LH_{6}	—	—	—	—	44.6	0.12	2	39.4	49.8	—	MPC; JPL
2025 LH_{7}	—	—	—	—	45.8	0.26	3	34.1	57.5	—	MPC; JPL
2025 LH_{8}	—	—	—	—	41.3	0.09	14	37.5	45.1	—	MPC; JPL
2025 LJ_{2}	5 June 2025	Simonyi Survey Telescope, Rubin Observatory (X05)	—	—	183.2	0.80	22	36.4	330.0	—	MPC; JPL
2025 LJ_{3}	5 June 2025	Simonyi Survey Telescope, Rubin Observatory (X05)	—	—	43.6	0.07	2	40.7	46.5	—	MPC; JPL
2025 LJ_{6}	—	—	—	—	43.6	0.08	3	40.3	46.9	—	MPC; JPL
2025 LJ_{7}	—	—	—	—	49.7	0.31	3	34.3	65.1	—	MPC; JPL
2025 LJ_{8}	—	—	—	—	43.2	0.07	2	40.0	46.4	—	MPC; JPL
2025 LK_{2}	5 June 2025	Simonyi Survey Telescope, Rubin Observatory (X05)	—	—	43.5	0.04	1	41.7	45.3	—	MPC; JPL
2025 LK_{3}	10 June 2025	Simonyi Survey Telescope, Rubin Observatory (X05)	—	—	43.6	0.09	2	39.5	47.6	—	MPC; JPL
2025 LK_{6}	—	—	—	—	46.8	0.32	11	31.7	61.8	—	MPC; JPL
2025 LK_{7}	—	—	—	—	30.5	0.13	2	26.6	34.5	—	MPC; JPL
2025 LL_{2}	5 June 2025	Simonyi Survey Telescope, Rubin Observatory (X05)	—	—	51.0	0.27	14	37.4	64.6	—	MPC; JPL
2025 LL_{3}	10 June 2025	Simonyi Survey Telescope, Rubin Observatory (X05)	—	—	44.0	0.04	1	42.3	45.7	—	MPC; JPL
2025 LL_{6}	—	—	—	—	43.2	0.08	11	39.7	46.6	—	MPC; JPL
2025 LL_{7}	—	—	—	—	42.9	0.04	1	41.1	44.6	—	MPC; JPL
2025 LM_{2}	5 June 2025	Simonyi Survey Telescope, Rubin Observatory (X05)	—	—	44.8	0.27	23	32.7	56.8	—	MPC; JPL
2025 LM_{3}	5 June 2025	Simonyi Survey Telescope, Rubin Observatory (X05)	—	—	43.6	0.01	2	43.0	44.3	—	MPC; JPL
2025 LM_{6}	—	—	—	—	55.3	0.39	18	33.5	77.1	—	MPC; JPL
2025 LM_{7}	—	—	—	—	46.1	0.11	6	41.3	51.0	—	MPC; JPL
2025 LN_{2}	5 June 2025	Simonyi Survey Telescope, Rubin Observatory (X05)	—	—	59.7	0.42	5	34.8	84.6	—	MPC; JPL
2025 LN_{3}	10 June 2025	Simonyi Survey Telescope, Rubin Observatory (X05)	—	—	39.3	0.22	16	30.5	48.0	—	MPC; JPL
2025 LN_{6}	—	—	—	—	45.6	0.22	4	35.8	55.5	—	MPC; JPL
2025 LN_{7}	—	—	—	—	39.7	0.09	13	36.0	43.3	—	MPC; JPL
2025 LO_{2}	5 June 2025	Simonyi Survey Telescope, Rubin Observatory (X05)	—	—	49.5	0.26	9	36.7	62.4	—	MPC; JPL
2025 LO_{3}	5 June 2025	Simonyi Survey Telescope, Rubin Observatory (X05)	—	—	45.8	0.16	8	38.3	53.3	—	MPC; JPL
2025 LO_{6}	—	—	—	—	53.3	0.37	5	33.6	73.0	—	MPC; JPL
2025 LO_{7}	—	—	—	—	47.3	0.26	8	35.0	59.7	—	MPC; JPL
2025 LP_{2}	10 June 2025	Simonyi Survey Telescope, Rubin Observatory (X05)	—	—	46.6	0.11	4	41.7	51.5	—	MPC; JPL
2025 LP_{3}	5 June 2025	Simonyi Survey Telescope, Rubin Observatory (X05)	—	—	45.7	0.09	2	41.5	50.0	—	MPC; JPL
2025 LP_{6}	—	—	—	—	47.4	0.27	9	34.7	60.0	—	MPC; JPL
2025 LP_{7}	—	—	—	—	44.8	0.20	3	35.7	53.9	—	MPC; JPL
2025 LQ_{2}	5 June 2025	Simonyi Survey Telescope, Rubin Observatory (X05)	—	—	65.3	0.48	23	34.2	96.5	—	MPC; JPL
2025 LQ_{3}	5 June 2025	Simonyi Survey Telescope, Rubin Observatory (X05)	—	—	43.8	0.10	4	39.6	48.1	—	MPC; JPL
2025 LQ_{6}	—	—	—	—	45.8	0.27	2	33.4	58.1	—	MPC; JPL
2025 LQ_{7}	—	—	—	—	43.8	0.03	6	42.6	45.0	—	MPC; JPL
2025 LR_{2}	5 June 2025	Simonyi Survey Telescope, Rubin Observatory (X05)	—	—	42.0	0.20	1	33.6	50.4	—	MPC; JPL
2025 LR_{3}	9 June 2025	Simonyi Survey Telescope, Rubin Observatory (X05)	—	—	43.9	0.17	14	36.6	51.2	—	MPC; JPL
2025 LR_{7}	—	—	—	—	45.1	0.16	3	37.9	52.3	—	MPC; JPL
2025 LS_{2}	5 June 2025	Simonyi Survey Telescope, Rubin Observatory (X05)	—	—	530.3	0.92	13	43.1	1017.5	—	MPC; JPL
2025 LS_{3}	5 June 2025	Simonyi Survey Telescope, Rubin Observatory (X05)	—	—	42.5	0.06	3	39.8	45.2	—	MPC; JPL
2025 LS_{5}	—	—	—	—	43.4	0.27	19	31.7	55.1	—	MPC; JPL
2025 LS_{7}	—	—	—	—	83.7	0.66	29	28.6	138.8	—	MPC; JPL
2025 LT_{2}	5 June 2025	Simonyi Survey Telescope, Rubin Observatory (X05)	—	—	53.7	0.28	8	38.6	68.9	—	MPC; JPL
2025 LT_{3}	5 June 2025	Simonyi Survey Telescope, Rubin Observatory (X05)	—	—	39.3	0.23	2	30.1	48.4	—	MPC; JPL
2025 LT_{5}	—	—	—	—	44.0	0.13	1	38.2	49.7	—	MPC; JPL
2025 LU_{2}	9 June 2025	Simonyi Survey Telescope, Rubin Observatory (X05)	—	—	42.8	0.04	2	41.1	44.6	—	MPC; JPL
2025 LU_{3}	9 June 2025	Simonyi Survey Telescope, Rubin Observatory (X05)	—	—	42.9	0.06	1	40.4	45.4	—	MPC; JPL
2025 LU_{5}	—	—	—	—	44.9	0.15	3	38.3	51.4	—	MPC; JPL
2025 LU_{6}	—	—	—	—	39.2	0.15	2	33.4	45.0	—	MPC; JPL
2025 LU_{7}	—	—	—	—	49.9	0.30	0	35.0	64.8	—	MPC; JPL
2025 LV_{2}	10 June 2025	Simonyi Survey Telescope, Rubin Observatory (X05)	—	—	43.5	0.12	4	38.5	48.5	—	MPC; JPL
2025 LV_{3}	9 June 2025	Simonyi Survey Telescope, Rubin Observatory (X05)	—	—	80.5	0.51	6	39.2	121.8	—	MPC; JPL
2025 LV_{5}	—	—	—	—	59.9	0.51	14	29.1	90.7	—	MPC; JPL
2025 LV_{6}	—	—	—	—	47.6	0.32	15	32.3	62.9	—	MPC; JPL
2025 LW_{2}	5 June 2025	Simonyi Survey Telescope, Rubin Observatory (X05)	—	—	53.6	0.35	24	35.0	72.3	—	MPC; JPL
2025 LW_{3}	5 June 2025	Simonyi Survey Telescope, Rubin Observatory (X05)	—	—	44.8	0.04	3	43.0	46.6	—	MPC; JPL
2025 LW_{6}	—	—	—	—	44.3	0.05	4	42.0	46.6	—	MPC; JPL
2025 LW_{7}	—	—	—	—	161.3	0.87	7	21.1	301.4	—	MPC; JPL
2025 LX_{2}	10 June 2025	Simonyi Survey Telescope, Rubin Observatory (X05)	—	—	43.1	0.03	5	41.9	44.2	—	MPC; JPL
2025 LX_{6}	—	—	—	—	44.2	0.08	8	40.6	47.8	—	MPC; JPL
2025 LX_{7}	—	—	—	—	35.0	0.13	10	30.6	39.4	—	MPC; JPL
2025 LY_{2}	5 June 2025	Simonyi Survey Telescope, Rubin Observatory (X05)	—	—	42.6	0.07	5	39.6	45.6	—	MPC; JPL
2025 LY_{6}	—	—	—	—	45.1	0.07	3	41.9	48.2	—	MPC; JPL
2025 LY_{7}	—	—	—	—	36.4	0.13	6	31.8	41.0	—	MPC; JPL
2025 LZ_{2}	5 June 2025	Simonyi Survey Telescope, Rubin Observatory (X05)	—	—	39.5	0.25	4	29.6	49.4	—	MPC; JPL
2025 LZ_{6}	—	—	—	—	44.6	0.05	3	42.2	46.9	—	MPC; JPL
2025 LZ_{7}	—	—	—	—	54.8	0.44	2	30.6	79.1	—	MPC; JPL
2025 MA_{349}	22 June 2025	Simonyi Survey Telescope, Rubin Observatory (X05)	—	—	34.7	0.10	4	31.3	38.1	—	MPC; JPL
2025 MA_{351}	21 June 2025	Simonyi Survey Telescope, Rubin Observatory (X05)	—	—	39.3	0.19	6	31.9	46.8	—	MPC; JPL
2025 MA_{352}	21 June 2025	Simonyi Survey Telescope, Rubin Observatory (X05)	—	—	52.5	0.22	29	41.2	63.8	—	MPC; JPL
2025 MA_{388}	—	—	—	—	123.7	0.81	11	23.6	223.9	—	MPC; JPL
2025 MA_{395}	—	—	—	—	70.5	0.67	18	23.6	117.4	—	MPC; JPL
2025 MA_{396}	—	—	—	—	37.4	0.16	7	31.5	43.3	—	MPC; JPL
2025 MA_{397}	—	—	—	—	45.8	0.21	7	36.3	55.4	—	MPC; JPL
2025 MA_{398}	—	—	—	—	38.1	0.21	13	30.3	45.9	—	MPC; JPL
2025 MA_{399}	—	—	—	—	51.8	0.44	3	29.1	74.5	—	MPC; JPL
2025 MA_{400}	—	—	—	—	41.7	0.12	20	36.9	46.6	—	MPC; JPL
2025 MA_{401}	—	—	—	—	119.0	0.77	24	27.0	210.9	—	MPC; JPL
2025 MA_{402}	—	—	—	—	51.9	0.44	2	28.9	75.0	—	MPC; JPL
2025 MA_{403}	—	—	—	—	43.1	0.15	6	36.6	49.5	—	MPC; JPL
2025 MB_{349}	21 June 2025	Simonyi Survey Telescope, Rubin Observatory (X05)	—	—	50.2	0.35	6	32.6	67.8	—	MPC; JPL
2025 MB_{350}	21 June 2025	Simonyi Survey Telescope, Rubin Observatory (X05)	—	—	45.5	0.12	3	40.2	50.8	—	MPC; JPL
2025 MB_{351}	21 June 2025	Simonyi Survey Telescope, Rubin Observatory (X05)	—	—	55.0	0.41	22	32.6	77.3	—	MPC; JPL
2025 MB_{352}	21 June 2025	Simonyi Survey Telescope, Rubin Observatory (X05)	—	—	264.5	0.87	14	33.8	495.3	—	MPC; JPL
2025 MB_{388}	—	—	—	—	55.9	0.51	5	27.3	84.6	—	MPC; JPL
2025 MB_{395}	—	—	—	—	42.7	0.17	6	35.3	50.1	—	MPC; JPL
2025 MB_{396}	—	—	—	—	190.4	0.81	35	36.0	344.8	—	MPC; JPL
2025 MB_{397}	—	—	—	—	45.0	0.28	28	32.3	57.7	—	MPC; JPL
2025 MB_{398}	—	—	—	—	34.7	0.12	4	30.4	39.1	—	MPC; JPL
2025 MB_{399}	—	—	—	—	35.1	0.06	29	32.8	37.3	—	MPC; JPL
2025 MB_{400}	—	—	—	—	39.2	0.20	9	31.3	47.1	—	MPC; JPL
2025 MB_{401}	—	—	—	—	46.9	0.20	6	37.6	56.3	—	MPC; JPL
2025 MB_{402}	—	—	—	—	48.7	0.34	1	32.2	65.2	—	MPC; JPL
2025 MB_{403}	—	—	—	—	44.5	0.12	1	39.1	49.9	—	MPC; JPL
2025 MC_{349}	30 June 2025	Simonyi Survey Telescope, Rubin Observatory (X05)	—	—	146.6	0.75	41	36.1	257.1	—	MPC; JPL
2025 MC_{350}	21 June 2025	Simonyi Survey Telescope, Rubin Observatory (X05)	—	—	52.5	0.28	25	37.8	67.2	—	MPC; JPL
2025 MC_{351}	21 June 2025	Simonyi Survey Telescope, Rubin Observatory (X05)	—	—	42.6	0.10	14	38.2	46.9	—	MPC; JPL
2025 MC_{352}	21 June 2025	Simonyi Survey Telescope, Rubin Observatory (X05)	—	—	32.8	0.10	11	29.5	36.1	—	MPC; JPL
2025 MC_{388}	—	—	—	—	49.6	0.53	9	23.4	75.8	—	MPC; JPL
2025 MC_{395}	—	—	—	—	172.4	0.80	19	34.2	310.5	—	MPC; JPL
2025 MC_{396}	—	—	—	—	49.2	0.35	4	31.9	66.4	—	MPC; JPL
2025 MC_{397}	—	—	—	—	44.6	0.09	3	40.5	48.7	—	MPC; JPL
2025 MC_{398}	—	—	—	—	41.6	0.26	25	30.6	52.5	—	MPC; JPL
2025 MC_{399}	—	—	—	—	74.0	0.65	4	25.8	122.2	—	MPC; JPL
2025 MC_{400}	—	—	—	—	118.8	0.67	8	39.6	198.0	—	MPC; JPL
2025 MC_{401}	—	—	—	—	43.4	0.05	16	41.0	45.8	—	MPC; JPL
2025 MC_{402}	—	—	—	—	41.9	0.08	20	38.4	45.3	—	MPC; JPL
2025 MC_{403}	—	—	—	—	863.6	0.95	3	40.4	1686.8	—	MPC; JPL
2025 MD_{348}	21 June 2025	Simonyi Survey Telescope, Rubin Observatory (X05)	—	—	43.2	0.34	7	28.3	58.0	—	MPC; JPL
2025 MD_{349}	21 June 2025	Simonyi Survey Telescope, Rubin Observatory (X05)	—	—	47.1	0.22	11	36.5	57.6	—	MPC; JPL
2025 MD_{350}	21 June 2025	Simonyi Survey Telescope, Rubin Observatory (X05)	—	—	61.1	0.43	25	34.6	87.6	—	MPC; JPL
2025 MD_{351}	21 June 2025	Simonyi Survey Telescope, Rubin Observatory (X05)	—	—	43.7	0.21	10	34.5	53.0	—	MPC; JPL
2025 MD_{352}	21 June 2025	Simonyi Survey Telescope, Rubin Observatory (X05)	—	—	39.1	0.32	7	26.6	51.7	—	MPC; JPL
2025 MD_{388}	—	—	—	—	41.7	0.12	20	36.5	46.9	—	MPC; JPL
2025 MD_{395}	—	—	—	—	40.3	0.24	6	30.5	50.1	—	MPC; JPL
2025 MD_{396}	—	—	—	—	72.7	0.65	3	25.2	120.2	—	MPC; JPL
2025 MD_{397}	—	—	—	—	43.3	0.05	13	41.2	45.4	—	MPC; JPL
2025 MD_{398}	—	—	—	—	50.8	0.10	18	45.6	56.0	—	MPC; JPL
2025 MD_{399}	—	—	—	—	360.0	0.93	3	24.1	696.0	—	MPC; JPL
2025 MD_{400}	—	—	—	—	62.5	0.54	14	29.0	96.0	—	MPC; JPL
2025 MD_{401}	—	—	—	—	44.0	0.18	5	36.2	51.8	—	MPC; JPL
2025 MD_{402}	—	—	—	—	52.2	0.44	22	29.4	74.9	—	MPC; JPL
2025 MD_{403}	—	—	—	—	92.3	0.60	14	36.8	147.7	—	MPC; JPL
2025 ME_{278}	21 June 2025	Simonyi Survey Telescope, Rubin Observatory (X05)	—	—	39.2	0.30	11	27.4	51.0	—	MPC; JPL
2025 ME_{348}	30 June 2025	Simonyi Survey Telescope, Rubin Observatory (X05)	—	—	40.0	0.22	8	31.2	48.8	—	MPC; JPL
2025 ME_{349}	21 June 2025	Simonyi Survey Telescope, Rubin Observatory (X05)	—	—	42.8	0.13	14	37.4	48.2	—	MPC; JPL
2025 ME_{350}	21 June 2025	Simonyi Survey Telescope, Rubin Observatory (X05)	—	—	52.1	0.41	12	30.7	73.6	—	MPC; JPL
2025 ME_{351}	30 June 2025	Simonyi Survey Telescope, Rubin Observatory (X05)	—	—	44.3	0.19	9	35.7	52.9	—	MPC; JPL
2025 ME_{352}	25 June 2025	Simonyi Survey Telescope, Rubin Observatory (X05)	—	—	53.9	0.43	7	30.6	77.1	—	MPC; JPL
2025 ME_{388}	—	—	—	—	39.3	0.28	13	28.4	50.3	—	MPC; JPL
2025 ME_{395}	—	—	—	—	55.3	0.40	15	33.2	77.4	—	MPC; JPL
2025 ME_{396}	—	—	—	—	56.7	0.33	14	37.9	75.6	—	MPC; JPL
2025 ME_{397}	—	—	—	—	140.8	0.84	4	23.1	258.5	—	MPC; JPL
2025 ME_{398}	—	—	—	—	41.7	0.10	4	37.5	45.8	—	MPC; JPL
2025 ME_{399}	—	—	—	—	46.1	0.36	20	29.6	62.7	—	MPC; JPL
2025 ME_{400}	—	—	—	—	38.3	0.17	15	31.8	44.7	—	MPC; JPL
2025 ME_{401}	—	—	—	—	204.3	0.85	8	31.7	377.0	—	MPC; JPL
2025 ME_{402}	—	—	—	—	51.0	0.36	3	32.5	69.6	—	MPC; JPL
2025 ME_{403}	—	—	—	—	91.4	0.62	32	34.3	148.5	—	MPC; JPL
2025 MF_{348}	30 June 2025	Simonyi Survey Telescope, Rubin Observatory (X05)	—	—	49.5	0.17	4	41.2	57.7	—	MPC; JPL
2025 MF_{349}	22 June 2025	Simonyi Survey Telescope, Rubin Observatory (X05)	—	—	45.8	0.25	10	34.6	57.0	—	MPC; JPL
2025 MF_{350}	21 June 2025	Simonyi Survey Telescope, Rubin Observatory (X05)	—	—	47.7	0.18	6	39.1	56.2	—	MPC; JPL
2025 MF_{351}	25 June 2025	Simonyi Survey Telescope, Rubin Observatory (X05)	—	—	45.4	0.26	11	33.8	57.0	—	MPC; JPL
2025 MF_{388}	—	—	—	—	59.1	0.43	13	33.9	84.3	—	MPC; JPL
2025 MF_{395}	—	—	—	—	44.0	0.16	21	36.8	51.1	—	MPC; JPL
2025 MF_{396}	—	—	—	—	45.6	0.15	24	38.6	52.6	—	MPC; JPL
2025 MF_{397}	—	—	—	—	57.9	0.49	6	29.8	86.1	—	MPC; JPL
2025 MF_{399}	—	—	—	—	50.9	0.33	4	34.1	67.7	—	MPC; JPL
2025 MF_{400}	—	—	—	—	44.5	0.05	10	42.2	46.7	—	MPC; JPL
2025 MF_{401}	—	—	—	—	38.1	0.10	1	34.2	42.0	—	MPC; JPL
2025 MF_{402}	—	—	—	—	52.4	0.37	0	33.1	71.7	—	MPC; JPL
2025 MF_{403}	—	—	—	—	41.9	0.12	23	36.7	47.1	—	MPC; JPL
2025 MG_{348}	21 June 2025	Simonyi Survey Telescope, Rubin Observatory (X05)	—	—	42.9	0.18	3	35.0	50.7	—	MPC; JPL
2025 MG_{349}	21 June 2025	Simonyi Survey Telescope, Rubin Observatory (X05)	—	—	55.5	0.44	31	31.3	79.7	—	MPC; JPL
2025 MG_{351}	21 June 2025	Simonyi Survey Telescope, Rubin Observatory (X05)	—	—	47.1	0.25	4	35.4	58.8	—	MPC; JPL
2025 MG_{352}	21 June 2025	Simonyi Survey Telescope, Rubin Observatory (X05)	—	—	55.3	0.34	15	36.3	74.2	—	MPC; JPL
2025 MG_{388}	—	—	—	—	68.9	0.50	12	34.4	103.4	—	MPC; JPL
2025 MG_{395}	—	—	—	—	39.1	0.12	9	34.5	43.7	—	MPC; JPL
2025 MG_{396}	—	—	—	—	58.4	0.46	22	31.4	85.4	—	MPC; JPL
2025 MG_{397}	—	—	—	—	53.4	0.41	20	31.5	75.2	—	MPC; JPL
2025 MG_{398}	—	—	—	—	119.0	0.84	2	19.5	218.5	—	MPC; JPL
2025 MG_{399}	—	—	—	—	55.0	0.58	3	23.3	86.7	—	MPC; JPL
2025 MG_{400}	—	—	—	—	47.1	0.30	14	33.0	61.3	—	MPC; JPL
2025 MG_{401}	—	—	—	—	38.9	0.04	4	37.4	40.3	—	MPC; JPL
2025 MG_{402}	—	—	—	—	49.8	0.33	9	33.5	66.1	—	MPC; JPL
2025 MG_{403}	—	—	—	—	46.8	0.35	10	30.6	63.1	—	MPC; JPL
2025 MH_{349}	21 June 2025	Simonyi Survey Telescope, Rubin Observatory (X05)	—	—	95.7	0.76	3	23.0	168.4	—	MPC; JPL
2025 MH_{350}	21 June 2025	Simonyi Survey Telescope, Rubin Observatory (X05)	—	—	113.5	0.66	29	39.1	187.8	—	MPC; JPL
2025 MH_{351}	21 June 2025	Simonyi Survey Telescope, Rubin Observatory (X05)	—	—	38.9	0.18	8	31.7	46.0	—	MPC; JPL
2025 MH_{387}	—	—	—	—	46.6	0.13	6	40.7	52.5	—	MPC; JPL
2025 MH_{388}	—	—	—	—	40.6	0.18	13	33.1	48.0	—	MPC; JPL
2025 MH_{395}	—	—	—	—	53.9	0.38	12	33.5	74.2	—	MPC; JPL
2025 MH_{396}	—	—	—	—	39.1	0.08	29	36.1	42.0	—	MPC; JPL
2025 MH_{397}	—	—	—	—	87.5	0.73	2	23.3	151.8	—	MPC; JPL
2025 MH_{398}	—	—	—	—	42.1	0.10	28	37.9	46.2	—	MPC; JPL
2025 MH_{399}	—	—	—	—	110.4	0.75	5	27.1	193.6	—	MPC; JPL
2025 MH_{400}	—	—	—	—	47.0	0.10	8	42.3	51.8	—	MPC; JPL
2025 MH_{401}	—	—	—	—	148.1	0.74	37	38.7	257.5	—	MPC; JPL
2025 MH_{402}	—	—	—	—	45.6	0.03	3	44.2	46.9	—	MPC; JPL
2025 MH_{403}	—	—	—	—	34.5	0.37	8	21.8	47.1	—	MPC; JPL
2025 MJ_{348}	21 June 2025	Simonyi Survey Telescope, Rubin Observatory (X05)	—	—	45.3	0.18	15	37.0	53.5	—	MPC; JPL
2025 MJ_{349}	21 June 2025	Simonyi Survey Telescope, Rubin Observatory (X05)	—	—	64.9	0.42	18	38.0	91.8	—	MPC; JPL
2025 MJ_{350}	21 June 2025	Simonyi Survey Telescope, Rubin Observatory (X05)	—	—	39.5	0.24	36	30.2	48.7	—	MPC; JPL
2025 MJ_{351}	21 June 2025	Simonyi Survey Telescope, Rubin Observatory (X05)	—	—	70.3	0.55	23	31.8	108.8	—	MPC; JPL
2025 MJ_{352}	21 June 2025	Simonyi Survey Telescope, Rubin Observatory (X05)	—	—	46.1	0.10	16	41.3	50.8	—	MPC; JPL
2025 MJ_{387}	—	—	—	—	43.3	0.12	31	38.1	48.5	—	MPC; JPL
2025 MJ_{388}	—	—	—	—	39.4	0.02	9	38.6	40.2	—	MPC; JPL
2025 MJ_{395}	—	—	—	—	57.6	0.37	13	36.4	78.7	—	MPC; JPL
2025 MJ_{396}	—	—	—	—	44.5	0.26	12	32.8	56.2	—	MPC; JPL
2025 MJ_{397}	—	—	—	—	44.5	0.10	4	40.0	49.0	—	MPC; JPL
2025 MJ_{398}	—	—	—	—	45.1	0.10	7	40.5	49.7	—	MPC; JPL
2025 MJ_{399}	—	—	—	—	42.3	0.28	5	30.5	54.1	—	MPC; JPL
2025 MJ_{400}	—	—	—	—	47.5	0.37	8	30.0	64.9	—	MPC; JPL
2025 MJ_{401}	—	—	—	—	43.3	0.09	7	39.2	47.3	—	MPC; JPL
2025 MJ_{402}	—	—	—	—	42.1	0.09	8	38.2	46.0	—	MPC; JPL
2025 MJ_{403}	—	—	—	—	56.4	0.64	19	20.4	92.5	—	MPC; JPL
2025 MK_{192}	21 June 2025	Simonyi Survey Telescope, Rubin Observatory (X05)	—	—	61.6	0.54	8	28.3	94.8	—	MPC; JPL
2025 MK_{259}	21 June 2025	Simonyi Survey Telescope, Rubin Observatory (X05)	—	—	39.7	0.22	6	30.9	48.5	—	MPC; JPL
2025 MK_{348}	21 June 2025	Simonyi Survey Telescope, Rubin Observatory (X05)	—	—	38.9	0.25	8	29.1	48.7	—	MPC; JPL
2025 MK_{349}	21 June 2025	Simonyi Survey Telescope, Rubin Observatory (X05)	—	—	47.7	0.32	5	32.4	63.0	—	MPC; JPL
2025 MK_{350}	21 June 2025	Simonyi Survey Telescope, Rubin Observatory (X05)	—	—	44.9	0.08	2	41.4	48.4	—	MPC; JPL
2025 MK_{351}	22 June 2025	Simonyi Survey Telescope, Rubin Observatory (X05)	—	—	47.0	0.24	25	35.8	58.3	—	MPC; JPL
2025 MK_{352}	21 June 2025	Simonyi Survey Telescope, Rubin Observatory (X05)	—	—	41.1	0.05	17	39.0	43.1	—	MPC; JPL
2025 MK_{387}	—	—	—	—	50.1	0.39	2	30.7	69.4	—	MPC; JPL
2025 MK_{394}	—	—	—	—	42.9	0.10	7	38.6	47.1	—	MPC; JPL
2025 MK_{395}	—	—	—	—	46.9	0.22	23	36.8	57.0	—	MPC; JPL
2025 MK_{396}	—	—	—	—	102.0	0.67	11	33.8	170.1	—	MPC; JPL
2025 MK_{397}	—	—	—	—	48.0	0.31	6	33.2	62.8	—	MPC; JPL
2025 MK_{399}	—	—	—	—	37.3	0.23	49	28.8	45.7	—	MPC; JPL
2025 MK_{400}	—	—	—	—	42.2	0.23	6	32.5	51.9	—	MPC; JPL
2025 MK_{401}	—	—	—	—	39.9	0.30	4	28.0	51.7	—	MPC; JPL
2025 ML_{348}	21 June 2025	Simonyi Survey Telescope, Rubin Observatory (X05)	—	—	39.1	0.25	11	29.3	48.8	—	MPC; JPL
2025 ML_{349}	21 June 2025	Simonyi Survey Telescope, Rubin Observatory (X05)	—	—	39.0	0.27	7	28.3	49.6	—	MPC; JPL
2025 ML_{350}	25 June 2025	Simonyi Survey Telescope, Rubin Observatory (X05)	—	—	38.4	0.12	17	33.8	43.1	—	MPC; JPL
2025 ML_{351}	21 June 2025	Simonyi Survey Telescope, Rubin Observatory (X05)	—	—	40.5	0.20	9	32.6	48.4	—	MPC; JPL
2025 ML_{352}	21 June 2025	Simonyi Survey Telescope, Rubin Observatory (X05)	—	—	68.7	0.55	1	31.2	106.3	—	MPC; JPL
2025 ML_{387}	—	—	—	—	54.2	0.66	6	18.7	89.7	—	MPC; JPL
2025 ML_{394}	—	—	—	—	48.3	0.10	33	43.4	53.2	—	MPC; JPL
2025 ML_{395}	—	—	—	—	47.2	0.23	9	36.3	58.1	—	MPC; JPL
2025 ML_{396}	—	—	—	—	54.0	0.58	9	22.7	85.2	—	MPC; JPL
2025 ML_{397}	—	—	—	—	43.1	0.05	2	40.9	45.2	—	MPC; JPL
2025 ML_{398}	—	—	—	—	40.4	0.20	22	32.3	48.5	—	MPC; JPL
2025 ML_{399}	—	—	—	—	48.4	0.22	12	37.7	59.0	—	MPC; JPL
2025 ML_{400}	—	—	—	—	36.6	0.18	11	30.0	43.2	—	MPC; JPL
2025 ML_{401}	—	—	—	—	43.6	0.28	25	31.2	55.9	—	MPC; JPL
2025 ML_{402}	—	—	—	—	46.0	0.21	3	36.5	55.6	—	MPC; JPL
2025 ML_{403}	—	—	—	—	42.9	0.37	17	26.9	58.9	—	MPC; JPL
2025 ML_{58}	22 April 2025	Simonyi Survey Telescope, Rubin Observatory (X05)	103	SDO	51.2	0.40	16	30.6	71.9	albedo: 0.124	MPC; JPL
2025 MM_{348}	21 June 2025	Simonyi Survey Telescope, Rubin Observatory (X05)	—	—	44.0	0.11	3	39.2	48.8	—	MPC; JPL
2025 MM_{349}	21 June 2025	Simonyi Survey Telescope, Rubin Observatory (X05)	—	—	54.9	0.36	4	35.3	74.4	—	MPC; JPL
2025 MM_{350}	21 June 2025	Simonyi Survey Telescope, Rubin Observatory (X05)	—	—	43.0	0.05	7	41.0	44.9	—	MPC; JPL
2025 MM_{351}	21 June 2025	Simonyi Survey Telescope, Rubin Observatory (X05)	—	—	45.0	0.19	4	36.6	53.3	—	MPC; JPL
2025 MM_{387}	—	—	—	—	47.3	0.08	2	43.7	50.9	—	MPC; JPL
2025 MM_{394}	—	—	—	—	46.8	0.33	18	31.5	62.0	—	MPC; JPL
2025 MM_{395}	—	—	—	—	51.7	0.33	32	34.5	68.9	—	MPC; JPL
2025 MM_{396}	—	—	—	—	42.1	0.13	34	36.8	47.5	—	MPC; JPL
2025 MM_{397}	—	—	—	—	47.2	0.16	28	39.6	54.7	—	MPC; JPL
2025 MM_{399}	—	—	—	—	81.7	0.57	21	35.0	128.4	—	MPC; JPL
2025 MM_{400}	—	—	—	—	51.4	0.34	3	34.2	68.7	—	MPC; JPL
2025 MM_{401}	—	—	—	—	34.6	0.11	8	30.8	38.3	—	MPC; JPL
2025 MM_{402}	—	—	—	—	44.4	0.13	8	38.7	50.1	—	MPC; JPL
2025 MM_{66}	2 May 2025	Simonyi Survey Telescope, Rubin Observatory (X05)	103	other TNO	47.6	0.22	9	37.0	58.2	albedo: 0.13	MPC; JPL
2025 MN_{348}	21 June 2025	Simonyi Survey Telescope, Rubin Observatory (X05)	—	—	44.5	0.11	7	39.8	49.2	—	MPC; JPL
2025 MN_{349}	21 June 2025	Simonyi Survey Telescope, Rubin Observatory (X05)	—	—	46.1	0.08	4	42.6	49.5	—	MPC; JPL
2025 MN_{350}	21 June 2025	Simonyi Survey Telescope, Rubin Observatory (X05)	—	—	41.5	0.08	9	38.2	44.8	—	MPC; JPL
2025 MN_{351}	21 June 2025	Simonyi Survey Telescope, Rubin Observatory (X05)	—	—	40.3	0.20	23	32.1	48.4	—	MPC; JPL
2025 MN_{387}	—	—	—	—	40.2	0.05	15	38.3	42.2	—	MPC; JPL
2025 MN_{394}	—	—	—	—	38.6	0.15	18	32.9	44.4	—	MPC; JPL
2025 MN_{395}	—	—	—	—	65.4	0.52	10	31.7	99.2	—	MPC; JPL
2025 MN_{396}	—	—	—	—	41.7	0.12	4	36.6	46.8	—	MPC; JPL
2025 MN_{397}	—	—	—	—	44.0	0.08	4	40.6	47.3	—	MPC; JPL
2025 MN_{398}	—	—	—	—	116.2	0.62	1	43.8	188.6	—	MPC; JPL
2025 MN_{399}	—	—	—	—	87.5	0.71	17	25.3	149.7	—	MPC; JPL
2025 MN_{400}	—	—	—	—	39.0	0.24	9	29.6	48.3	—	MPC; JPL
2025 MN_{401}	—	—	—	—	39.2	0.14	8	33.8	44.6	—	MPC; JPL
2025 MN_{402}	—	—	—	—	41.6	0.08	20	38.5	44.7	—	MPC; JPL
2025 MN_{403}	—	—	—	—	46.4	0.10	4	41.6	51.3	—	MPC; JPL
2025 MO_{348}	21 June 2025	Simonyi Survey Telescope, Rubin Observatory (X05)	—	—	45.1	0.35	8	29.4	60.8	—	MPC; JPL
2025 MO_{349}	21 June 2025	Simonyi Survey Telescope, Rubin Observatory (X05)	—	—	45.7	0.09	33	41.6	49.7	—	MPC; JPL
2025 MO_{350}	22 June 2025	Simonyi Survey Telescope, Rubin Observatory (X05)	—	—	44.7	0.28	5	32.2	57.1	—	MPC; JPL
2025 MO_{351}	21 June 2025	Simonyi Survey Telescope, Rubin Observatory (X05)	—	—	37.2	0.16	10	31.5	42.9	—	MPC; JPL
2025 MO_{387}	—	—	—	—	68.0	0.36	2	43.8	92.3	—	MPC; JPL
2025 MO_{395}	—	—	—	—	62.2	0.43	12	35.6	88.8	—	MPC; JPL
2025 MO_{396}	—	—	—	—	44.0	0.09	28	40.2	47.9	—	MPC; JPL
2025 MO_{397}	—	—	—	—	47.0	0.10	3	42.4	51.6	—	MPC; JPL
2025 MO_{399}	—	—	—	—	48.0	0.29	12	34.0	62.1	—	MPC; JPL
2025 MO_{400}	—	—	—	—	37.7	0.02	28	36.9	38.5	—	MPC; JPL
2025 MO_{401}	—	—	—	—	72.0	0.70	9	21.7	122.4	—	MPC; JPL
2025 MO_{402}	—	—	—	—	68.0	0.47	38	35.9	100.0	—	MPC; JPL
2025 MO_{403}	—	—	—	—	43.3	0.10	28	38.9	47.6	—	MPC; JPL
2025 MP_{185}	21 June 2025	Simonyi Survey Telescope, Rubin Observatory (X05)	—	—	58.4	0.55	6	26.6	90.3	—	MPC; JPL
2025 MP_{348}	21 June 2025	Simonyi Survey Telescope, Rubin Observatory (X05)	—	—	39.6	0.17	11	33.0	46.2	—	MPC; JPL
2025 MP_{349}	21 June 2025	Simonyi Survey Telescope, Rubin Observatory (X05)	—	—	36.4	0.06	20	34.3	38.6	—	MPC; JPL
2025 MP_{35}	22 April 2025	Simonyi Survey Telescope, Rubin Observatory (X05)	96	other TNO	46.1	0.19	10	37.6	54.7	albedo: 0.13	MPC; JPL
2025 MP_{350}	21 June 2025	Simonyi Survey Telescope, Rubin Observatory (X05)	—	—	43.3	0.21	15	34.2	52.4	—	MPC; JPL
2025 MP_{351}	21 June 2025	Simonyi Survey Telescope, Rubin Observatory (X05)	—	—	42.7	0.04	0	40.8	44.6	—	MPC; JPL
2025 MP_{387}	—	—	—	—	993.3	0.97	14	26.6	1960.0	—	MPC; JPL
2025 MP_{395}	—	—	—	—	45.1	0.30	22	31.6	58.6	—	MPC; JPL
2025 MP_{396}	—	—	—	—	52.0	0.25	2	39.1	64.9	—	MPC; JPL
2025 MP_{397}	—	—	—	—	44.5	0.38	2	27.6	61.5	—	MPC; JPL
2025 MP_{398}	—	—	—	—	126.4	0.83	14	22.1	230.6	—	MPC; JPL
2025 MP_{399}	—	—	—	—	171.1	0.83	34	29.6	312.5	—	MPC; JPL
2025 MP_{400}	—	—	—	—	43.5	0.21	22	34.2	52.8	—	MPC; JPL
2025 MP_{401}	—	—	—	—	45.6	0.20	23	36.3	54.8	—	MPC; JPL
2025 MP_{402}	—	—	—	—	55.3	0.42	9	32.1	78.6	—	MPC; JPL
2025 MP_{403}	—	—	—	—	66.5	0.54	4	30.7	102.3	—	MPC; JPL
2025 MQ_{348}	21 June 2025	Simonyi Survey Telescope, Rubin Observatory (X05)	—	—	43.2	0.06	4	40.8	45.6	—	MPC; JPL
2025 MQ_{349}	21 June 2025	Simonyi Survey Telescope, Rubin Observatory (X05)	—	—	55.3	0.40	5	33.1	77.5	—	MPC; JPL
2025 MQ_{350}	21 June 2025	Simonyi Survey Telescope, Rubin Observatory (X05)	—	—	39.1	0.29	15	27.9	50.4	—	MPC; JPL
2025 MQ_{351}	21 June 2025	Simonyi Survey Telescope, Rubin Observatory (X05)	—	—	64.1	0.50	15	31.9	96.4	—	MPC; JPL
2025 MQ_{387}	—	—	—	—	67.9	0.53	19	31.9	103.8	—	MPC; JPL
2025 MQ_{394}	—	—	—	—	45.9	0.43	9	26.1	65.8	—	MPC; JPL
2025 MQ_{395}	—	—	—	—	57.3	0.36	7	36.9	77.7	—	MPC; JPL
2025 MQ_{396}	—	—	—	—	43.6	0.15	9	37.1	50.2	—	MPC; JPL
2025 MQ_{397}	—	—	—	—	42.1	0.09	23	38.3	45.8	—	MPC; JPL
2025 MQ_{398}	—	—	—	—	50.3	0.32	4	34.4	66.2	—	MPC; JPL
2025 MQ_{399}	—	—	—	—	58.1	0.49	10	29.4	86.8	—	MPC; JPL
2025 MQ_{400}	—	—	—	—	36.5	0.09	5	33.1	39.9	—	MPC; JPL
2025 MQ_{401}	—	—	—	—	93.5	0.75	10	23.2	163.7	—	MPC; JPL
2025 MQ_{402}	—	—	—	—	42.5	0.19	34	34.5	50.5	—	MPC; JPL
2025 MQ_{403}	—	—	—	—	38.3	0.10	28	34.4	42.1	—	MPC; JPL
2025 MR_{348}	21 June 2025	Simonyi Survey Telescope, Rubin Observatory (X05)	—	—	47.3	0.33	2	31.7	62.8	—	MPC; JPL
2025 MR_{349}	21 June 2025	Simonyi Survey Telescope, Rubin Observatory (X05)	—	—	44.2	0.07	6	41.2	47.2	—	MPC; JPL
2025 MR_{350}	21 June 2025	Simonyi Survey Telescope, Rubin Observatory (X05)	—	—	43.6	0.13	15	37.9	49.3	—	MPC; JPL
2025 MR_{351}	21 June 2025	Simonyi Survey Telescope, Rubin Observatory (X05)	—	—	42.0	0.26	8	31.2	52.8	—	MPC; JPL
2025 MR_{387}	—	—	—	—	77.3	0.58	5	32.1	122.5	—	MPC; JPL
2025 MR_{394}	—	—	—	—	39.1	0.25	7	29.5	48.7	—	MPC; JPL
2025 MR_{395}	—	—	—	—	76.3	0.51	23	37.7	115.0	—	MPC; JPL
2025 MR_{396}	—	—	—	—	47.5	0.40	1	28.4	66.7	—	MPC; JPL
2025 MR_{397}	—	—	—	—	57.0	0.25	24	42.8	71.2	—	MPC; JPL
2025 MR_{398}	—	—	—	—	62.7	0.57	16	26.8	98.7	—	MPC; JPL
2025 MR_{399}	—	—	—	—	46.6	0.09	8	42.6	50.6	—	MPC; JPL
2025 MR_{400}	—	—	—	—	43.2	0.08	15	39.6	46.8	—	MPC; JPL
2025 MR_{401}	—	—	—	—	55.9	0.39	26	34.0	77.9	—	MPC; JPL
2025 MR_{402}	—	—	—	—	39.0	0.24	10	29.5	48.4	—	MPC; JPL
2025 MR_{403}	—	—	—	—	132.1	0.80	9	26.7	237.6	—	MPC; JPL
2025 MS_{348}	21 June 2025	Simonyi Survey Telescope, Rubin Observatory (X05)	—	—	65.7	0.47	10	34.9	96.6	—	MPC; JPL
2025 MS_{349}	21 June 2025	Simonyi Survey Telescope, Rubin Observatory (X05)	—	—	43.3	0.09	10	39.2	47.3	—	MPC; JPL
2025 MS_{350}	21 June 2025	Simonyi Survey Telescope, Rubin Observatory (X05)	—	—	51.8	0.35	4	33.7	69.9	—	MPC; JPL
2025 MS_{351}	30 June 2025	Simonyi Survey Telescope, Rubin Observatory (X05)	—	—	51.8	0.61	23	20.5	83.2	—	MPC; JPL
2025 MS_{387}	—	—	—	—	54.1	0.42	30	31.4	76.8	—	MPC; JPL
2025 MS_{394}	—	—	—	—	40.6	0.25	19	30.6	50.7	—	MPC; JPL
2025 MS_{395}	—	—	—	—	48.8	0.51	10	23.8	73.8	—	MPC; JPL
2025 MS_{396}	—	—	—	—	67.9	0.62	3	25.6	110.2	—	MPC; JPL
2025 MS_{397}	—	—	—	—	47.1	0.06	19	44.1	50.1	—	MPC; JPL
2025 MS_{398}	—	—	—	—	76.1	0.67	12	25.4	126.8	—	MPC; JPL
2025 MS_{399}	—	—	—	—	44.7	0.06	3	41.9	47.6	—	MPC; JPL
2025 MS_{400}	—	—	—	—	43.7	0.14	18	37.7	49.8	—	MPC; JPL
2025 MS_{401}	—	—	—	—	38.9	0.05	20	37.1	40.7	—	MPC; JPL
2025 MS_{402}	—	—	—	—	37.1	0.19	13	30.1	44.2	—	MPC; JPL
2025 MS_{403}	—	—	—	—	34.5	0.22	35	26.8	42.2	—	MPC; JPL
2025 MT_{348}	21 June 2025	Simonyi Survey Telescope, Rubin Observatory (X05)	—	—	39.3	0.20	19	31.4	47.2	—	MPC; JPL
2025 MT_{349}	21 June 2025	Simonyi Survey Telescope, Rubin Observatory (X05)	—	—	44.6	0.10	5	40.2	49.1	—	MPC; JPL
2025 MT_{350}	21 June 2025	Simonyi Survey Telescope, Rubin Observatory (X05)	—	—	42.9	0.05	5	41.0	44.8	—	MPC; JPL
2025 MT_{351}	22 June 2025	Simonyi Survey Telescope, Rubin Observatory (X05)	—	—	82.2	0.62	10	31.0	133.4	—	MPC; JPL
2025 MT_{387}	21 June 2025	Simonyi Survey Telescope, Rubin Observatory (X05)	—	—	54.9	0.34	29	36.4	73.5	—	MPC; JPL
2025 MT_{394}	—	—	—	—	37.3	0.19	10	30.2	44.4	—	MPC; JPL
2025 MT_{395}	—	—	—	—	46.2	0.21	10	36.5	55.8	—	MPC; JPL
2025 MT_{396}	—	—	—	—	45.6	0.17	2	37.9	53.3	—	MPC; JPL
2025 MT_{397}	—	—	—	—	47.1	0.19	5	38.2	55.9	—	MPC; JPL
2025 MT_{398}	—	—	—	—	41.4	0.10	2	37.2	45.7	—	MPC; JPL
2025 MT_{399}	—	—	—	—	44.0	0.10	1	39.6	48.4	—	MPC; JPL
2025 MT_{400}	—	—	—	—	42.7	0.06	4	40.1	45.3	—	MPC; JPL
2025 MT_{401}	—	—	—	—	108.8	0.68	10	34.5	183.1	—	MPC; JPL
2025 MT_{402}	—	—	—	—	43.1	0.16	12	36.1	50.2	—	MPC; JPL
2025 MT_{403}	—	—	—	—	156.5	0.78	10	34.9	278.2	—	MPC; JPL
2025 MU_{349}	21 June 2025	Simonyi Survey Telescope, Rubin Observatory (X05)	—	—	40.1	0.24	22	30.6	49.6	—	MPC; JPL
2025 MU_{350}	21 June 2025	Simonyi Survey Telescope, Rubin Observatory (X05)	—	—	35.0	0.03	9	33.9	36.1	—	MPC; JPL
2025 MU_{351}	21 June 2025	Simonyi Survey Telescope, Rubin Observatory (X05)	—	—	46.8	0.42	8	26.9	66.6	—	MPC; JPL
2025 MU_{387}	—	—	—	—	53.9	0.53	15	25.3	82.4	—	MPC; JPL
2025 MU_{394}	—	—	—	—	37.6	0.15	19	31.9	43.4	—	MPC; JPL
2025 MU_{395}	—	—	—	—	46.7	0.21	6	36.7	56.7	—	MPC; JPL
2025 MU_{396}	—	—	—	—	669.7	0.97	1	21.0	1318.3	—	MPC; JPL
2025 MU_{397}	—	—	—	—	45.7	0.07	11	42.6	48.7	—	MPC; JPL
2025 MU_{398}	—	—	—	—	43.5	0.11	1	38.7	48.3	—	MPC; JPL
2025 MU_{399}	—	—	—	—	50.1	0.66	4	17.3	83.0	—	MPC; JPL
2025 MU_{400}	—	—	—	—	39.7	0.19	12	32.0	47.4	—	MPC; JPL
2025 MU_{401}	—	—	—	—	43.3	0.10	10	39.1	47.4	—	MPC; JPL
2025 MU_{402}	—	—	—	—	42.7	0.10	9	38.3	47.1	—	MPC; JPL
2025 MU_{403}	—	—	—	—	44.0	0.05	3	41.9	46.0	—	MPC; JPL
2025 MV_{13}	2 May 2025	Simonyi Survey Telescope, Rubin Observatory (X05)	109	other TNO	39.3	0.25	22	29.6	49.0	albedo: 0.13	MPC; JPL
2025 MV_{348}	21 June 2025	Simonyi Survey Telescope, Rubin Observatory (X05)	—	—	43.3	0.14	13	37.3	49.2	—	MPC; JPL
2025 MV_{349}	21 June 2025	Simonyi Survey Telescope, Rubin Observatory (X05)	—	—	44.8	0.13	11	39.0	50.6	—	MPC; JPL
2025 MV_{350}	21 June 2025	Simonyi Survey Telescope, Rubin Observatory (X05)	—	—	42.3	0.19	10	34.1	50.4	—	MPC; JPL
2025 MV_{351}	21 June 2025	Simonyi Survey Telescope, Rubin Observatory (X05)	—	—	40.5	0.05	18	38.3	42.7	—	MPC; JPL
2025 MV_{387}	—	—	—	—	34.3	0.39	12	21.0	47.5	—	MPC; JPL
2025 MV_{394}	—	—	—	—	39.2	0.17	8	32.4	46.1	—	MPC; JPL
2025 MV_{395}	—	—	—	—	67.5	0.55	19	30.5	104.4	—	MPC; JPL
2025 MV_{396}	—	—	—	—	39.1	0.12	7	34.4	43.8	—	MPC; JPL
2025 MV_{397}	—	—	—	—	50.5	0.36	25	32.3	68.7	—	MPC; JPL
2025 MV_{398}	—	—	—	—	39.1	0.26	4	28.8	49.3	—	MPC; JPL
2025 MV_{399}	—	—	—	—	56.2	0.35	3	36.8	75.7	—	MPC; JPL
2025 MV_{400}	—	—	—	—	42.0	0.11	6	37.3	46.7	—	MPC; JPL
2025 MV_{401}	—	—	—	—	32.9	0.09	31	29.8	36.0	—	MPC; JPL
2025 MV_{402}	—	—	—	—	52.2	0.40	15	31.3	73.1	—	MPC; JPL
2025 MW_{348}	21 June 2025	Simonyi Survey Telescope, Rubin Observatory (X05)	—	—	56.4	0.49	9	29.0	83.7	—	MPC; JPL
2025 MW_{349}	21 June 2025	Simonyi Survey Telescope, Rubin Observatory (X05)	—	—	78.2	0.56	5	34.7	121.8	—	MPC; JPL
2025 MW_{350}	21 June 2025	Simonyi Survey Telescope, Rubin Observatory (X05)	—	—	39.8	0.19	9	32.1	47.5	—	MPC; JPL
2025 MW_{351}	21 June 2025	Simonyi Survey Telescope, Rubin Observatory (X05)	—	—	43.9	0.06	2	41.4	46.4	—	MPC; JPL
2025 MW_{387}	—	—	—	—	108.7	0.69	8	33.2	184.1	—	MPC; JPL
2025 MW_{394}	—	—	—	—	37.0	0.11	8	32.8	41.2	—	MPC; JPL
2025 MW_{395}	—	—	—	—	41.2	0.13	9	36.0	46.4	—	MPC; JPL
2025 MW_{396}	—	—	—	—	74.9	0.62	4	28.2	121.6	—	MPC; JPL
2025 MW_{397}	—	—	—	—	43.5	0.07	2	40.5	46.6	—	MPC; JPL
2025 MW_{398}	—	—	—	—	46.4	0.10	3	41.7	51.2	—	MPC; JPL
2025 MW_{399}	—	—	—	—	55.6	0.38	34	34.6	76.6	—	MPC; JPL
2025 MW_{400}	—	—	—	—	86.6	0.52	35	42.0	131.2	—	MPC; JPL
2025 MW_{401}	—	—	—	—	35.4	0.26	18	26.3	44.6	—	MPC; JPL
2025 MW_{402}	—	—	—	—	44.3	0.13	9	38.7	50.0	—	MPC; JPL
2025 MW_{47}	28 April 2025	Simonyi Survey Telescope, Rubin Observatory (X05)	97	other TNO	39.2	0.32	7	26.5	51.8	albedo: 0.13	MPC; JPL
2025 MX_{349}	30 June 2025	Simonyi Survey Telescope, Rubin Observatory (X05)	—	—	39.5	0.06	23	37.1	41.8	—	MPC; JPL
2025 MX_{350}	21 June 2025	Simonyi Survey Telescope, Rubin Observatory (X05)	—	—	42.1	0.19	10	34.3	50.0	—	MPC; JPL
2025 MX_{351}	30 June 2025	Simonyi Survey Telescope, Rubin Observatory (X05)	—	—	41.5	0.30	10	29.1	53.9	—	MPC; JPL
2025 MX_{387}	—	—	—	—	38.3	0.09	9	34.7	41.8	—	MPC; JPL
2025 MX_{394}	—	—	—	—	41.1	0.19	3	33.2	48.9	—	MPC; JPL
2025 MX_{395}	—	—	—	—	74.2	0.48	10	38.2	110.2	—	MPC; JPL
2025 MX_{396}	—	—	—	—	42.0	0.07	11	39.2	44.8	—	MPC; JPL
2025 MX_{397}	—	—	—	—	45.5	0.25	26	34.0	57.0	—	MPC; JPL
2025 MX_{398}	—	—	—	—	43.3	0.36	4	27.7	58.9	—	MPC; JPL
2025 MX_{399}	—	—	—	—	47.2	0.18	5	38.9	55.5	—	MPC; JPL
2025 MX_{400}	—	—	—	—	53.0	0.34	8	34.9	71.2	—	MPC; JPL
2025 MX_{401}	—	—	—	—	79.7	0.60	9	32.3	127.2	—	MPC; JPL
2025 MX_{402}	—	—	—	—	67.5	0.40	30	40.2	94.7	—	MPC; JPL
2025 MY_{348}	30 June 2025	Simonyi Survey Telescope, Rubin Observatory (X05)	—	—	48.6	0.27	11	35.6	61.5	—	MPC; JPL
2025 MY_{349}	21 June 2025	Simonyi Survey Telescope, Rubin Observatory (X05)	—	—	54.9	0.50	13	27.4	82.5	—	MPC; JPL
2025 MY_{350}	21 June 2025	Simonyi Survey Telescope, Rubin Observatory (X05)	—	—	46.4	0.21	14	36.6	56.1	—	MPC; JPL
2025 MY_{351}	25 June 2025	Simonyi Survey Telescope, Rubin Observatory (X05)	—	—	41.8	0.10	20	37.6	46.0	—	MPC; JPL
2025 MY_{387}	—	—	—	—	88.5	0.67	11	29.0	147.9	—	MPC; JPL
2025 MY_{394}	—	—	—	—	34.0	0.04	6	32.7	35.4	—	MPC; JPL
2025 MY_{395}	—	—	—	—	42.1	0.09	19	38.5	45.8	—	MPC; JPL
2025 MY_{396}	—	—	—	—	44.4	0.21	12	35.1	53.7	—	MPC; JPL
2025 MY_{397}	—	—	—	—	49.6	0.19	2	40.1	59.1	—	MPC; JPL
2025 MY_{398}	—	—	—	—	37.4	0.22	10	29.2	45.5	—	MPC; JPL
2025 MY_{399}	—	—	—	—	39.4	0.32	13	26.7	52.1	—	MPC; JPL
2025 MY_{401}	—	—	—	—	47.4	0.34	20	31.3	63.5	—	MPC; JPL
2025 MY_{402}	—	—	—	—	47.1	0.27	12	34.6	59.7	—	MPC; JPL
2025 MZ_{348}	30 June 2025	Simonyi Survey Telescope, Rubin Observatory (X05)	—	—	47.8	0.29	11	34.2	61.5	—	MPC; JPL
2025 MZ_{349}	21 June 2025	Simonyi Survey Telescope, Rubin Observatory (X05)	—	—	51.6	0.25	17	38.5	64.7	—	MPC; JPL
2025 MZ_{350}	21 June 2025	Simonyi Survey Telescope, Rubin Observatory (X05)	—	—	35.1	0.08	8	32.3	37.9	—	MPC; JPL
2025 MZ_{351}	22 June 2025	Simonyi Survey Telescope, Rubin Observatory (X05)	—	—	40.4	0.09	20	36.7	44.1	—	MPC; JPL
2025 MZ_{387}	—	—	—	—	37.9	0.15	6	32.4	43.4	—	MPC; JPL
2025 MZ_{391}	—	—	—	—	155.3	0.84	3	25.5	285.1	—	MPC; JPL
2025 MZ_{394}	—	—	—	—	39.4	0.12	8	34.5	44.3	—	MPC; JPL
2025 MZ_{395}	—	—	—	—	41.1	0.16	21	34.4	47.9	—	MPC; JPL
2025 MZ_{396}	—	—	—	—	42.9	0.21	23	33.8	51.9	—	MPC; JPL
2025 MZ_{397}	—	—	—	—	46.5	0.13	4	40.3	52.7	—	MPC; JPL
2025 MZ_{398}	—	—	—	—	45.4	0.22	4	35.6	55.3	—	MPC; JPL
2025 MZ_{399}	—	—	—	—	48.5	0.15	27	41.1	56.0	—	MPC; JPL
2025 MZ_{400}	—	—	—	—	39.3	0.15	6	33.2	45.4	—	MPC; JPL
2025 MZ_{401}	—	—	—	—	45.9	0.16	39	38.5	53.2	—	MPC; JPL
2025 MZ_{402}	—	—	—	—	62.6	0.57	21	27.1	98.0	—	MPC; JPL
2025 NA_{189}	1 July 2025	Simonyi Survey Telescope, Rubin Observatory (X05)	—	—	43.8	0.05	2	41.7	46.0	—	MPC; JPL
2025 NA_{190}	1 July 2025	Simonyi Survey Telescope, Rubin Observatory (X05)	—	—	39.1	0.17	7	32.4	45.7	—	MPC; JPL
2025 NA_{191}	2 July 2025	Simonyi Survey Telescope, Rubin Observatory (X05)	—	—	49.4	0.41	16	29.0	69.8	—	MPC; JPL
2025 NA_{192}	2 July 2025	Simonyi Survey Telescope, Rubin Observatory (X05)	—	—	48.3	0.23	9	37.3	59.3	—	MPC; JPL
2025 NA_{193}	2 July 2025	Simonyi Survey Telescope, Rubin Observatory (X05)	—	—	56.9	0.35	8	36.8	76.9	—	MPC; JPL
2025 NA_{194}	1 July 2025	Simonyi Survey Telescope, Rubin Observatory (X05)	—	—	43.8	0.12	9	38.5	49.2	—	MPC; JPL
2025 NA_{384}	—	—	—	—	37.1	0.87	3	5.0	69.2	—	MPC; JPL
2025 NA_{547}	—	—	—	—	42.9	0.44	8	23.9	61.8	—	MPC; JPL
2025 NA_{548}	—	—	—	—	65.2	0.48	11	33.8	96.6	—	MPC; JPL
2025 NA_{549}	—	—	—	—	40.7	0.07	18	37.8	43.7	—	MPC; JPL
2025 NA_{550}	—	—	—	—	42.3	0.10	18	38.0	46.6	—	MPC; JPL
2025 NA_{551}	—	—	—	—	42.3	0.18	0	34.6	50.1	—	MPC; JPL
2025 NA_{552}	—	—	—	—	84.4	0.46	3	45.6	123.2	—	MPC; JPL
2025 NA_{558}	—	—	—	—	43.5	0.08	5	40.1	46.9	—	MPC; JPL
2025 NA_{559}	—	—	—	—	40.9	0.07	17	38.0	43.8	—	MPC; JPL
2025 NA_{560}	—	—	—	—	120.9	0.72	11	34.4	207.5	—	MPC; JPL
2025 NA_{561}	—	—	—	—	56.4	0.37	8	35.5	77.4	—	MPC; JPL
2025 NA_{562}	—	—	—	—	38.4	0.14	9	33.0	43.8	—	MPC; JPL
2025 NA_{563}	—	—	—	—	43.3	0.01	10	43.0	43.6	—	MPC; JPL
2025 NB_{189}	1 July 2025	Simonyi Survey Telescope, Rubin Observatory (X05)	—	—	45.5	0.14	10	39.0	51.9	—	MPC; JPL
2025 NB_{190}	1 July 2025	Simonyi Survey Telescope, Rubin Observatory (X05)	—	—	37.9	0.16	9	31.8	44.0	—	MPC; JPL
2025 NB_{191}	3 July 2025	Simonyi Survey Telescope, Rubin Observatory (X05)	—	—	44.3	0.04	3	42.4	46.3	—	MPC; JPL
2025 NB_{192}	2 July 2025	Simonyi Survey Telescope, Rubin Observatory (X05)	—	—	42.7	0.01	5	42.3	43.1	—	MPC; JPL
2025 NB_{193}	2 July 2025	Simonyi Survey Telescope, Rubin Observatory (X05)	—	—	44.0	0.05	3	41.6	46.4	—	MPC; JPL
2025 NB_{194}	14 July 2025	Simonyi Survey Telescope, Rubin Observatory (X05)	—	—	87.6	0.70	15	26.6	148.6	—	MPC; JPL
2025 NB_{54}	2 July 2025	Simonyi Survey Telescope, Rubin Observatory (X05)	—	—	47.8	0.68	40	15.5	80.1	—	MPC; JPL
2025 NB_{547}	—	—	—	—	37.6	0.19	4	30.4	44.7	—	MPC; JPL
2025 NB_{548}	—	—	—	—	53.6	0.34	11	35.4	71.7	—	MPC; JPL
2025 NB_{549}	—	—	—	—	42.4	0.36	8	27.3	57.4	—	MPC; JPL
2025 NB_{550}	—	—	—	—	64.9	0.37	7	40.7	89.2	—	MPC; JPL
2025 NB_{551}	—	—	—	—	71.8	0.54	28	32.8	110.8	—	MPC; JPL
2025 NB_{552}	—	—	—	—	71.9	0.61	22	28.3	115.4	—	MPC; JPL
2025 NB_{558}	—	—	—	—	44.7	0.25	23	33.6	55.9	—	MPC; JPL
2025 NB_{559}	—	—	—	—	39.0	0.23	7	30.0	48.0	—	MPC; JPL
2025 NB_{560}	—	—	—	—	350.9	0.90	9	33.9	668.0	—	MPC; JPL
2025 NB_{561}	—	—	—	—	53.4	0.38	9	33.2	73.6	—	MPC; JPL
2025 NB_{562}	—	—	—	—	45.1	0.12	13	39.8	50.4	—	MPC; JPL
2025 NB_{563}	—	—	—	—	47.5	0.25	1	35.7	59.3	—	MPC; JPL
2025 NC_{189}	1 July 2025	Simonyi Survey Telescope, Rubin Observatory (X05)	—	—	52.5	0.25	8	39.2	65.7	—	MPC; JPL
2025 NC_{190}	2 July 2025	Simonyi Survey Telescope, Rubin Observatory (X05)	—	—	38.3	0.19	5	31.0	45.5	—	MPC; JPL
2025 NC_{191}	1 July 2025	Simonyi Survey Telescope, Rubin Observatory (X05)	—	—	62.5	0.43	5	35.6	89.4	—	MPC; JPL
2025 NC_{192}	2 July 2025	Simonyi Survey Telescope, Rubin Observatory (X05)	—	—	44.6	0.17	6	36.9	52.3	—	MPC; JPL
2025 NC_{193}	2 July 2025	Simonyi Survey Telescope, Rubin Observatory (X05)	—	—	43.6	0.10	2	39.1	48.1	—	MPC; JPL
2025 NC_{194}	14 July 2025	Simonyi Survey Telescope, Rubin Observatory (X05)	—	—	43.4	0.11	12	38.6	48.1	—	MPC; JPL
2025 NC_{547}	—	—	—	—	40.7	0.32	5	27.6	53.7	—	MPC; JPL
2025 NC_{548}	—	—	—	—	48.1	0.35	10	31.2	65.0	—	MPC; JPL
2025 NC_{549}	—	—	—	—	43.4	0.26	10	32.1	54.8	—	MPC; JPL
2025 NC_{550}	—	—	—	—	89.1	0.57	13	38.4	139.9	—	MPC; JPL
2025 NC_{551}	—	—	—	—	57.0	0.25	5	42.5	71.5	—	MPC; JPL
2025 NC_{552}	—	—	—	—	52.7	0.30	18	37.0	68.5	—	MPC; JPL
2025 NC_{558}	—	—	—	—	165.8	0.84	6	26.2	305.5	—	MPC; JPL
2025 NC_{559}	—	—	—	—	47.0	0.19	4	38.0	56.0	—	MPC; JPL
2025 NC_{560}	—	—	—	—	48.5	0.40	31	28.9	68.0	—	MPC; JPL
2025 NC_{561}	—	—	—	—	66.4	0.42	18	38.7	94.0	—	MPC; JPL
2025 NC_{562}	—	—	—	—	49.4	0.25	15	36.9	61.8	—	MPC; JPL
2025 NC_{563}	—	—	—	—	47.4	0.17	1	39.2	55.6	—	MPC; JPL
2025 ND_{189}	2 July 2025	Simonyi Survey Telescope, Rubin Observatory (X05)	—	—	45.5	0.09	1	41.6	49.3	—	MPC; JPL
2025 ND_{190}	1 July 2025	Simonyi Survey Telescope, Rubin Observatory (X05)	—	—	53.9	0.24	10	41.2	66.5	—	MPC; JPL
2025 ND_{191}	4 July 2025	Simonyi Survey Telescope, Rubin Observatory (X05)	—	—	44.2	0.11	3	39.5	48.9	—	MPC; JPL
2025 ND_{192}	2 July 2025	Simonyi Survey Telescope, Rubin Observatory (X05)	—	—	39.8	0.17	7	32.9	46.7	—	MPC; JPL
2025 ND_{193}	1 July 2025	Simonyi Survey Telescope, Rubin Observatory (X05)	—	—	43.6	0.05	2	41.4	45.8	—	MPC; JPL
2025 ND_{497}	—	—	—	—	42.6	0.04	1	40.9	44.2	—	MPC; JPL
2025 ND_{547}	—	—	—	—	46.3	0.32	8	31.4	61.2	—	MPC; JPL
2025 ND_{548}	—	—	—	—	45.8	0.48	35	23.7	68.0	—	MPC; JPL
2025 ND_{549}	—	—	—	—	41.6	0.08	13	38.3	44.8	—	MPC; JPL
2025 ND_{550}	—	—	—	—	48.2	0.27	3	35.2	61.2	—	MPC; JPL
2025 ND_{551}	—	—	—	—	56.4	0.39	6	34.5	78.4	—	MPC; JPL
2025 ND_{552}	—	—	—	—	113.7	0.67	27	37.3	190.1	—	MPC; JPL
2025 ND_{558}	—	—	—	—	39.0	0.10	13	35.2	42.8	—	MPC; JPL
2025 ND_{559}	—	—	—	—	50.7	0.28	12	36.5	64.8	—	MPC; JPL
2025 ND_{560}	—	—	—	—	49.4	0.35	10	32.2	66.6	—	MPC; JPL
2025 ND_{561}	—	—	—	—	92.3	0.64	11	33.7	150.8	—	MPC; JPL
2025 ND_{562}	—	—	—	—	42.2	0.22	16	33.1	51.3	—	MPC; JPL
2025 ND_{563}	—	—	—	—	40.0	0.24	12	30.5	49.5	—	MPC; JPL
2025 NE_{189}	2 July 2025	Simonyi Survey Telescope, Rubin Observatory (X05)	—	—	138.5	0.80	14	27.5	249.6	—	MPC; JPL
2025 NE_{190}	1 July 2025	Simonyi Survey Telescope, Rubin Observatory (X05)	—	—	43.9	0.31	2	30.1	57.6	—	MPC; JPL
2025 NE_{191}	1 July 2025	Simonyi Survey Telescope, Rubin Observatory (X05)	—	—	107.7	0.85	3	15.8	199.7	—	MPC; JPL
2025 NE_{192}	1 July 2025	Simonyi Survey Telescope, Rubin Observatory (X05)	—	—	44.0	0.05	4	41.8	46.2	—	MPC; JPL
2025 NE_{193}	1 July 2025	Simonyi Survey Telescope, Rubin Observatory (X05)	—	—	43.5	0.09	4	39.5	47.5	—	MPC; JPL
2025 NE_{194}	1 July 2025	Simonyi Survey Telescope, Rubin Observatory (X05)	—	—	43.7	0.22	6	34.1	53.3	—	MPC; JPL
2025 NE_{497}	—	—	—	—	58.2	0.39	9	35.4	80.9	—	MPC; JPL
2025 NE_{547}	—	—	—	—	42.2	0.28	27	30.5	54.0	—	MPC; JPL
2025 NE_{548}	—	—	—	—	38.2	0.10	7	34.3	42.2	—	MPC; JPL
2025 NE_{549}	—	—	—	—	42.1	0.37	7	26.7	57.5	—	MPC; JPL
2025 NE_{550}	—	—	—	—	38.6	0.18	6	31.7	45.6	—	MPC; JPL
2025 NE_{551}	—	—	—	—	46.9	0.10	2	42.0	51.8	—	MPC; JPL
2025 NE_{552}	4 July 2025	Simonyi Survey Telescope, Rubin Observatory (X05)	—	—	53.5	0.33	18	35.6	71.4	—	MPC; JPL
2025 NE_{558}	—	—	—	—	42.2	0.06	2	39.6	44.7	—	MPC; JPL
2025 NE_{559}	—	—	—	—	38.8	0.13	21	33.9	43.8	—	MPC; JPL
2025 NE_{560}	—	—	—	—	44.2	0.09	7	40.1	48.4	—	MPC; JPL
2025 NE_{561}	—	—	—	—	43.2	0.08	9	39.5	46.9	—	MPC; JPL
2025 NE_{562}	—	—	—	—	50.0	0.33	18	33.4	66.5	—	MPC; JPL
2025 NE_{563}	—	—	—	—	42.8	0.10	11	38.5	47.1	—	MPC; JPL
2025 NF_{189}	1 July 2025	Simonyi Survey Telescope, Rubin Observatory (X05)	—	—	45.3	0.14	2	39.0	51.5	—	MPC; JPL
2025 NF_{190}	1 July 2025	Simonyi Survey Telescope, Rubin Observatory (X05)	—	—	52.7	0.23	22	40.6	64.8	—	MPC; JPL
2025 NF_{191}	2 July 2025	Simonyi Survey Telescope, Rubin Observatory (X05)	—	—	44.2	0.17	5	36.8	51.7	—	MPC; JPL
2025 NF_{192}	1 July 2025	Simonyi Survey Telescope, Rubin Observatory (X05)	—	—	40.9	0.07	28	38.1	43.8	—	MPC; JPL
2025 NF_{193}	7 July 2025	Simonyi Survey Telescope, Rubin Observatory (X05)	—	—	39.5	0.16	15	33.2	45.8	—	MPC; JPL
2025 NF_{194}	1 July 2025	Simonyi Survey Telescope, Rubin Observatory (X05)	—	—	39.2	0.25	10	29.5	49.0	—	MPC; JPL
2025 NF_{47}	1 July 2025	Simonyi Survey Telescope, Rubin Observatory (X05)	—	—	40.4	0.28	12	29.3	51.6	—	MPC; JPL
2025 NF_{497}	—	—	—	—	43.5	0.23	12	33.6	53.4	—	MPC; JPL
2025 NF_{547}	—	—	—	—	54.2	0.46	10	29.5	78.9	—	MPC; JPL
2025 NF_{548}	—	—	—	—	43.4	0.18	13	35.6	51.2	—	MPC; JPL
2025 NF_{549}	—	—	—	—	37.7	0.04	24	36.3	39.1	—	MPC; JPL
2025 NF_{550}	—	—	—	—	47.5	0.15	22	40.4	54.5	—	MPC; JPL
2025 NF_{551}	—	—	—	—	98.1	0.80	4	19.3	176.9	—	MPC; JPL
2025 NF_{552}	—	—	—	—	57.9	0.35	20	37.8	78.1	—	MPC; JPL
2025 NF_{558}	—	—	—	—	44.5	0.05	3	42.0	46.9	—	MPC; JPL
2025 NF_{559}	—	—	—	—	52.8	0.49	29	26.7	79.0	—	MPC; JPL
2025 NF_{560}	—	—	—	—	55.5	0.44	18	31.4	79.7	—	MPC; JPL
2025 NF_{561}	—	—	—	—	38.8	0.11	1	34.7	43.0	—	MPC; JPL
2025 NF_{562}	—	—	—	—	47.2	0.21	22	37.2	57.3	—	MPC; JPL
2025 NF_{563}	—	—	—	—	47.9	0.22	5	37.4	58.4	—	MPC; JPL
2025 NG_{189}	2 July 2025	Simonyi Survey Telescope, Rubin Observatory (X05)	—	—	45.9	0.18	4	37.4	54.3	—	MPC; JPL
2025 NG_{190}	2 July 2025	Simonyi Survey Telescope, Rubin Observatory (X05)	—	—	39.3	0.18	2	32.1	46.4	—	MPC; JPL
2025 NG_{191}	2 July 2025	Simonyi Survey Telescope, Rubin Observatory (X05)	—	—	43.1	0.28	8	31.1	55.0	—	MPC; JPL
2025 NG_{192}	2 July 2025	Simonyi Survey Telescope, Rubin Observatory (X05)	—	—	58.7	0.41	12	35.0	82.5	—	MPC; JPL
2025 NG_{193}	1 July 2025	Simonyi Survey Telescope, Rubin Observatory (X05)	—	—	43.8	0.11	4	39.1	48.5	—	MPC; JPL
2025 NG_{194}	1 July 2025	Simonyi Survey Telescope, Rubin Observatory (X05)	—	—	37.1	0.24	15	28.1	46.1	—	MPC; JPL
2025 NG_{497}	—	—	—	—	51.9	0.37	20	32.6	71.1	—	MPC; JPL
2025 NG_{547}	—	—	—	—	39.7	0.20	11	31.7	47.6	—	MPC; JPL
2025 NG_{548}	—	—	—	—	97.1	0.63	6	36.0	158.2	—	MPC; JPL
2025 NG_{549}	—	—	—	—	45.9	0.16	12	38.6	53.3	—	MPC; JPL
2025 NG_{550}	—	—	—	—	312.6	0.92	0	26.1	599.0	—	MPC; JPL
2025 NG_{551}	—	—	—	—	49.1	0.40	4	29.4	68.8	—	MPC; JPL
2025 NG_{552}	—	—	—	—	79.7	0.68	10	25.9	133.6	—	MPC; JPL
2025 NG_{558}	—	—	—	—	47.9	0.21	3	37.8	58.0	—	MPC; JPL
2025 NG_{559}	—	—	—	—	36.7	0.12	18	32.2	41.1	—	MPC; JPL
2025 NG_{560}	—	—	—	—	74.4	0.63	13	27.2	121.7	—	MPC; JPL
2025 NG_{561}	—	—	—	—	71.5	0.48	6	37.3	105.6	—	MPC; JPL
2025 NG_{562}	—	—	—	—	40.5	0.24	10	30.9	50.0	—	MPC; JPL
2025 NG_{563}	—	—	—	—	44.8	0.10	2	40.2	49.4	—	MPC; JPL
2025 NH_{189}	4 July 2025	Simonyi Survey Telescope, Rubin Observatory (X05)	—	—	45.6	0.17	2	37.8	53.4	—	MPC; JPL
2025 NH_{190}	1 July 2025	Simonyi Survey Telescope, Rubin Observatory (X05)	—	—	51.2	0.20	11	41.2	61.2	—	MPC; JPL
2025 NH_{191}	1 July 2025	Simonyi Survey Telescope, Rubin Observatory (X05)	—	—	41.3	0.03	3	40.0	42.5	—	MPC; JPL
2025 NH_{192}	2 July 2025	Simonyi Survey Telescope, Rubin Observatory (X05)	—	—	43.1	0.04	2	41.3	44.8	—	MPC; JPL
2025 NH_{193}	1 July 2025	Simonyi Survey Telescope, Rubin Observatory (X05)	—	—	100.2	0.70	10	30.0	170.4	—	MPC; JPL
2025 NH_{194}	4 July 2025	Simonyi Survey Telescope, Rubin Observatory (X05)	—	—	40.1	0.10	14	36.0	44.2	—	MPC; JPL
2025 NH_{497}	—	—	—	—	45.1	0.16	3	37.8	52.5	—	MPC; JPL
2025 NH_{547}	—	—	—	—	42.1	0.24	7	31.8	52.4	—	MPC; JPL
2025 NH_{548}	—	—	—	—	40.9	0.19	32	33.2	48.6	—	MPC; JPL
2025 NH_{549}	—	—	—	—	46.4	0.26	14	34.2	58.6	—	MPC; JPL
2025 NH_{550}	—	—	—	—	43.0	0.06	6	40.3	45.6	—	MPC; JPL
2025 NH_{551}	—	—	—	—	44.9	0.10	5	40.2	49.5	—	MPC; JPL
2025 NH_{552}	—	—	—	—	43.8	0.09	1	39.8	47.8	—	MPC; JPL
2025 NH_{558}	—	—	—	—	45.8	0.38	1	28.3	63.4	—	MPC; JPL
2025 NH_{559}	—	—	—	—	43.9	0.07	9	40.9	46.9	—	MPC; JPL
2025 NH_{560}	—	—	—	—	43.0	0.11	8	38.1	47.9	—	MPC; JPL
2025 NH_{561}	—	—	—	—	159.7	0.74	2	40.7	278.6	—	MPC; JPL
2025 NH_{562}	—	—	—	—	49.8	0.44	7	27.8	71.8	—	MPC; JPL
2025 NH_{563}	—	—	—	—	46.0	0.19	17	37.4	54.6	—	MPC; JPL
2025 NJ_{189}	4 July 2025	Simonyi Survey Telescope, Rubin Observatory (X05)	—	—	46.0	0.15	7	39.1	53.0	—	MPC; JPL
2025 NJ_{190}	1 July 2025	Simonyi Survey Telescope, Rubin Observatory (X05)	—	—	42.6	0.02	2	41.6	43.6	—	MPC; JPL
2025 NJ_{192}	11 July 2025	Simonyi Survey Telescope, Rubin Observatory (X05)	—	—	44.0	0.19	0	35.8	52.2	—	MPC; JPL
2025 NJ_{193}	11 July 2025	Simonyi Survey Telescope, Rubin Observatory (X05)	—	—	39.3	0.08	18	36.0	42.6	—	MPC; JPL
2025 NJ_{194}	1 July 2025	Simonyi Survey Telescope, Rubin Observatory (X05)	—	—	54.3	0.44	8	30.3	78.3	—	MPC; JPL
2025 NJ_{497}	—	—	—	—	207.0	0.85	17	31.7	382.2	—	MPC; JPL
2025 NJ_{547}	—	—	—	—	72.1	0.56	21	31.6	112.5	—	MPC; JPL
2025 NJ_{548}	—	—	—	—	40.5	0.18	3	33.3	47.7	—	MPC; JPL
2025 NJ_{549}	—	—	—	—	46.8	0.28	8	33.8	59.8	—	MPC; JPL
2025 NJ_{550}	—	—	—	—	42.0	0.05	2	39.9	44.1	—	MPC; JPL
2025 NJ_{551}	—	—	—	—	43.3	0.07	3	40.4	46.1	—	MPC; JPL
2025 NJ_{552}	—	—	—	—	44.8	0.06	3	42.1	47.5	—	MPC; JPL
2025 NJ_{558}	—	—	—	—	80.2	0.75	4	19.9	140.5	—	MPC; JPL
2025 NJ_{559}	—	—	—	—	49.3	0.33	9	33.2	65.4	—	MPC; JPL
2025 NJ_{560}	—	—	—	—	36.6	0.60	20	14.5	58.8	—	MPC; JPL
2025 NJ_{561}	—	—	—	—	47.1	0.14	11	40.3	53.9	—	MPC; JPL
2025 NJ_{562}	—	—	—	—	35.7	0.71	4	10.2	61.2	—	MPC; JPL
2025 NJ_{563}	—	—	—	—	45.0	0.23	5	34.8	55.2	—	MPC; JPL
2025 NK_{189}	1 July 2025	Simonyi Survey Telescope, Rubin Observatory (X05)	—	—	44.3	0.07	2	41.1	47.5	—	MPC; JPL
2025 NK_{190}	2 July 2025	Simonyi Survey Telescope, Rubin Observatory (X05)	—	—	46.2	0.13	15	40.4	51.9	—	MPC; JPL
2025 NK_{191}	2 July 2025	Simonyi Survey Telescope, Rubin Observatory (X05)	—	—	39.3	0.05	7	37.4	41.2	—	MPC; JPL
2025 NK_{192}	2 July 2025	Simonyi Survey Telescope, Rubin Observatory (X05)	—	—	43.2	0.06	5	40.6	45.8	—	MPC; JPL
2025 NK_{193}	1 July 2025	Simonyi Survey Telescope, Rubin Observatory (X05)	—	—	45.8	0.16	6	38.5	53.2	—	MPC; JPL
2025 NK_{194}	1 July 2025	Simonyi Survey Telescope, Rubin Observatory (X05)	—	—	45.3	0.09	34	41.0	49.5	—	MPC; JPL
2025 NK_{497}	—	—	—	—	805.9	0.97	1	21.1	1590.7	—	MPC; JPL
2025 NK_{547}	—	—	—	—	38.6	0.17	2	32.0	45.2	—	MPC; JPL
2025 NK_{548}	—	—	—	—	43.2	0.16	30	36.5	49.9	—	MPC; JPL
2025 NK_{549}	—	—	—	—	66.5	0.60	20	26.7	106.2	—	MPC; JPL
2025 NK_{550}	—	—	—	—	56.8	0.57	2	24.5	89.1	—	MPC; JPL
2025 NK_{551}	—	—	—	—	46.7	0.26	8	34.8	58.6	—	MPC; JPL
2025 NK_{552}	—	—	—	—	43.3	0.10	8	39.0	47.6	—	MPC; JPL
2025 NK_{558}	—	—	—	—	40.1	0.27	3	29.1	51.1	—	MPC; JPL
2025 NK_{559}	—	—	—	—	47.4	0.28	9	34.3	60.6	—	MPC; JPL
2025 NK_{560}	—	—	—	—	45.6	0.25	29	34.1	57.2	—	MPC; JPL
2025 NK_{561}	—	—	—	—	52.2	0.43	8	29.7	74.8	—	MPC; JPL
2025 NK_{562}	—	—	—	—	51.6	0.41	3	30.5	72.8	—	MPC; JPL
2025 NK_{563}	—	—	—	—	49.4	0.22	2	38.8	60.0	—	MPC; JPL
2025 NL_{189}	2 July 2025	Simonyi Survey Telescope, Rubin Observatory (X05)	—	—	41.0	0.15	5	35.1	47.0	—	MPC; JPL
2025 NL_{190}	2 July 2025	Simonyi Survey Telescope, Rubin Observatory (X05)	—	—	47.3	0.17	14	39.3	55.4	—	MPC; JPL
2025 NL_{191}	2 July 2025	Simonyi Survey Telescope, Rubin Observatory (X05)	—	—	41.9	0.15	17	35.7	48.1	—	MPC; JPL
2025 NL_{192}	2 July 2025	Simonyi Survey Telescope, Rubin Observatory (X05)	—	—	60.8	0.27	28	44.4	77.1	—	MPC; JPL
2025 NL_{193}	2 July 2025	Simonyi Survey Telescope, Rubin Observatory (X05)	—	—	39.4	0.19	11	31.7	47.0	—	MPC; JPL
2025 NL_{497}	—	—	—	—	43.6	0.22	3	34.2	52.9	—	MPC; JPL
2025 NL_{546}	—	—	—	—	42.6	0.01	2	42.1	43.2	—	MPC; JPL
2025 NL_{547}	—	—	—	—	68.8	0.73	7	18.8	118.8	—	MPC; JPL
2025 NL_{548}	—	—	—	—	42.3	0.32	21	28.7	55.9	—	MPC; JPL
2025 NL_{549}	—	—	—	—	39.2	0.10	13	35.4	43.1	—	MPC; JPL
2025 NL_{550}	—	—	—	—	42.4	0.13	10	36.8	47.9	—	MPC; JPL
2025 NL_{551}	—	—	—	—	42.9	0.21	7	33.9	51.9	—	MPC; JPL
2025 NL_{552}	—	—	—	—	116.9	0.65	4	41.1	192.7	—	MPC; JPL
2025 NL_{558}	—	—	—	—	61.8	0.58	3	26.3	97.3	—	MPC; JPL
2025 NL_{559}	—	—	—	—	44.9	0.12	6	39.7	50.1	—	MPC; JPL
2025 NL_{560}	—	—	—	—	44.1	0.09	3	40.1	48.1	—	MPC; JPL
2025 NL_{561}	—	—	—	—	44.9	0.09	9	41.1	48.8	—	MPC; JPL
2025 NL_{562}	—	—	—	—	54.0	0.38	3	33.4	74.6	—	MPC; JPL
2025 NL_{563}	—	—	—	—	50.9	0.15	15	43.1	58.8	—	MPC; JPL
2025 NM_{189}	2 July 2025	Simonyi Survey Telescope, Rubin Observatory (X05)	—	—	45.6	0.14	4	39.0	52.2	—	MPC; JPL
2025 NM_{190}	2 July 2025	Simonyi Survey Telescope, Rubin Observatory (X05)	—	—	47.2	0.29	30	33.7	60.7	—	MPC; JPL
2025 NM_{191}	1 July 2025	Simonyi Survey Telescope, Rubin Observatory (X05)	—	—	171.5	0.79	24	35.8	307.2	—	MPC; JPL
2025 NM_{192}	1 July 2025	Simonyi Survey Telescope, Rubin Observatory (X05)	—	—	42.6	0.04	1	41.1	44.1	—	MPC; JPL
2025 NM_{193}	2 July 2025	Simonyi Survey Telescope, Rubin Observatory (X05)	—	—	43.5	0.24	11	33.0	54.1	—	MPC; JPL
2025 NM_{497}	—	—	—	—	69.5	0.39	3	42.5	96.5	—	MPC; JPL
2025 NM_{546}	—	—	—	—	44.3	0.07	32	41.3	47.2	—	MPC; JPL
2025 NM_{547}	—	—	—	—	40.3	0.39	6	24.6	55.9	—	MPC; JPL
2025 NM_{548}	—	—	—	—	63.7	0.42	20	36.9	90.5	—	MPC; JPL
2025 NM_{549}	—	—	—	—	82.9	0.58	19	34.8	130.9	—	MPC; JPL
2025 NM_{550}	—	—	—	—	92.0	0.67	7	30.0	154.0	—	MPC; JPL
2025 NM_{551}	—	—	—	—	45.7	0.23	3	35.0	56.4	—	MPC; JPL
2025 NM_{558}	—	—	—	—	39.4	0.19	11	32.1	46.8	—	MPC; JPL
2025 NM_{559}	—	—	—	—	45.7	0.17	3	37.9	53.6	—	MPC; JPL
2025 NM_{560}	—	—	—	—	46.0	0.11	3	41.0	50.9	—	MPC; JPL
2025 NM_{561}	—	—	—	—	45.7	0.15	9	38.6	52.7	—	MPC; JPL
2025 NM_{562}	—	—	—	—	43.8	0.02	4	42.8	44.8	—	MPC; JPL
2025 NM_{563}	—	—	—	—	71.9	0.54	24	33.4	110.4	—	MPC; JPL
2025 NN_{189}	3 July 2025	Simonyi Survey Telescope, Rubin Observatory (X05)	—	—	52.6	0.42	7	30.7	74.5	—	MPC; JPL
2025 NN_{190}	2 July 2025	Simonyi Survey Telescope, Rubin Observatory (X05)	—	—	97.9	0.65	14	34.5	161.3	—	MPC; JPL
2025 NN_{191}	2 July 2025	Simonyi Survey Telescope, Rubin Observatory (X05)	—	—	42.5	0.14	28	36.6	48.4	—	MPC; JPL
2025 NN_{192}	2 July 2025	Simonyi Survey Telescope, Rubin Observatory (X05)	—	—	44.3	0.09	3	40.6	48.1	—	MPC; JPL
2025 NN_{193}	2 July 2025	Simonyi Survey Telescope, Rubin Observatory (X05)	—	—	44.1	0.15	2	37.7	50.5	—	MPC; JPL
2025 NN_{497}	—	—	—	—	35.3	0.36	10	22.6	47.9	—	MPC; JPL
2025 NN_{50}	14 July 2025	Simonyi Survey Telescope, Rubin Observatory (X05)	—	—	55.7	0.41	35	32.8	78.6	—	MPC; JPL
2025 NN_{548}	—	—	—	—	56.5	0.60	9	22.7	90.3	—	MPC; JPL
2025 NN_{549}	—	—	—	—	52.4	0.25	2	39.1	65.7	—	MPC; JPL
2025 NN_{550}	—	—	—	—	41.2	0.05	2	39.1	43.2	—	MPC; JPL
2025 NN_{551}	—	—	—	—	50.7	0.36	18	32.4	68.9	—	MPC; JPL
2025 NN_{552}	—	—	—	—	44.3	0.10	22	40.0	48.6	—	MPC; JPL
2025 NN_{558}	—	—	—	—	60.9	0.45	2	33.6	88.3	—	MPC; JPL
2025 NN_{559}	—	—	—	—	44.9	0.18	2	36.9	52.9	—	MPC; JPL
2025 NN_{560}	—	—	—	—	46.5	0.11	4	41.2	51.8	—	MPC; JPL
2025 NN_{561}	—	—	—	—	57.1	0.41	9	33.5	80.6	—	MPC; JPL
2025 NN_{562}	—	—	—	—	42.7	0.03	2	41.4	44.0	—	MPC; JPL
2025 NN_{563}	—	—	—	—	47.2	0.23	15	36.2	58.2	—	MPC; JPL
2025 NO_{124}	—	—	—	—	46.4	0.97	9	1.4	91.4	—	MPC; JPL
2025 NO_{189}	2 July 2025	Simonyi Survey Telescope, Rubin Observatory (X05)	—	—	50.4	0.20	6	40.2	60.6	—	MPC; JPL
2025 NO_{190}	2 July 2025	Simonyi Survey Telescope, Rubin Observatory (X05)	—	—	87.2	0.67	13	29.2	145.1	—	MPC; JPL
2025 NO_{191}	2 July 2025	Simonyi Survey Telescope, Rubin Observatory (X05)	—	—	39.2	0.21	4	31.2	47.2	—	MPC; JPL
2025 NO_{192}	4 July 2025	Simonyi Survey Telescope, Rubin Observatory (X05)	—	—	42.2	0.02	3	41.5	42.9	—	MPC; JPL
2025 NO_{193}	1 July 2025	Simonyi Survey Telescope, Rubin Observatory (X05)	—	—	43.8	0.08	2	40.4	47.2	—	MPC; JPL
2025 NO_{497}	—	—	—	—	46.2	0.09	3	41.8	50.5	—	MPC; JPL
2025 NO_{547}	—	—	—	—	34.0	0.07	11	31.7	36.4	—	MPC; JPL
2025 NO_{548}	—	—	—	—	70.7	0.48	7	36.9	104.4	—	MPC; JPL
2025 NO_{549}	—	—	—	—	41.5	0.06	11	39.0	44.0	—	MPC; JPL
2025 NO_{550}	—	—	—	—	79.9	0.50	2	40.1	119.8	—	MPC; JPL
2025 NO_{551}	—	—	—	—	46.1	0.12	40	40.5	51.7	—	MPC; JPL
2025 NO_{552}	—	—	—	—	44.1	0.10	3	39.7	48.4	—	MPC; JPL
2025 NO_{558}	—	—	—	—	48.2	0.33	13	32.1	64.3	—	MPC; JPL
2025 NO_{559}	—	—	—	—	43.1	0.01	2	42.8	43.4	—	MPC; JPL
2025 NO_{560}	—	—	—	—	46.2	0.22	3	36.0	56.4	—	MPC; JPL
2025 NO_{561}	—	—	—	—	68.4	0.42	10	39.6	97.1	—	MPC; JPL
2025 NO_{562}	—	—	—	—	62.3	0.80	18	12.4	112.2	—	MPC; JPL
2025 NO_{563}	—	—	—	—	96.2	0.71	19	28.0	164.3	—	MPC; JPL
2025 NP_{189}	1 July 2025	Simonyi Survey Telescope, Rubin Observatory (X05)	—	—	39.4	0.10	4	35.6	43.2	—	MPC; JPL
2025 NP_{190}	1 July 2025	Simonyi Survey Telescope, Rubin Observatory (X05)	—	—	50.1	0.26	19	37.3	63.0	—	MPC; JPL
2025 NP_{191}	1 July 2025	Simonyi Survey Telescope, Rubin Observatory (X05)	—	—	86.4	0.58	7	36.5	136.3	—	MPC; JPL
2025 NP_{192}	2 July 2025	Simonyi Survey Telescope, Rubin Observatory (X05)	—	—	36.2	0.12	3	31.7	40.6	—	MPC; JPL
2025 NP_{193}	1 July 2025	Simonyi Survey Telescope, Rubin Observatory (X05)	—	—	39.4	0.21	6	31.2	47.6	—	MPC; JPL
2025 NP_{497}	—	—	—	—	40.4	0.02	14	39.7	41.0	—	MPC; JPL
2025 NP_{547}	—	—	—	—	39.9	0.27	7	29.2	50.7	—	MPC; JPL
2025 NP_{548}	—	—	—	—	39.1	0.16	6	32.7	45.5	—	MPC; JPL
2025 NP_{549}	—	—	—	—	96.5	0.63	29	35.9	157.1	—	MPC; JPL
2025 NP_{550}	—	—	—	—	43.7	0.27	18	31.8	55.6	—	MPC; JPL
2025 NP_{551}	—	—	—	—	52.1	0.39	8	31.6	72.6	—	MPC; JPL
2025 NP_{552}	—	—	—	—	131.3	0.75	12	32.8	229.8	—	MPC; JPL
2025 NP_{558}	—	—	—	—	44.4	0.17	1	37.0	51.8	—	MPC; JPL
2025 NP_{559}	—	—	—	—	41.5	0.21	29	33.0	50.0	—	MPC; JPL
2025 NP_{560}	—	—	—	—	55.6	0.48	28	29.0	82.1	—	MPC; JPL
2025 NP_{561}	—	—	—	—	44.0	0.06	4	41.5	46.5	—	MPC; JPL
2025 NP_{562}	—	—	—	—	46.6	0.16	32	39.3	54.0	—	MPC; JPL
2025 NP_{563}	—	—	—	—	39.5	0.11	20	35.3	43.8	—	MPC; JPL
2025 NQ_{189}	2 July 2025	Simonyi Survey Telescope, Rubin Observatory (X05)	—	—	46.1	0.11	4	40.9	51.3	—	MPC; JPL
2025 NQ_{190}	4 July 2025	Simonyi Survey Telescope, Rubin Observatory (X05)	—	—	48.3	0.15	16	41.1	55.5	—	MPC; JPL
2025 NQ_{191}	1 July 2025	Simonyi Survey Telescope, Rubin Observatory (X05)	—	—	39.0	0.20	11	31.3	46.7	—	MPC; JPL
2025 NQ_{192}	4 July 2025	Simonyi Survey Telescope, Rubin Observatory (X05)	—	—	44.8	0.20	32	36.0	53.5	—	MPC; JPL
2025 NQ_{193}	2 July 2025	Simonyi Survey Telescope, Rubin Observatory (X05)	—	—	44.4	0.27	2	32.2	56.6	—	MPC; JPL
2025 NQ_{497}	—	—	—	—	35.8	0.16	2	30.0	41.6	—	MPC; JPL
2025 NQ_{547}	—	—	—	—	36.4	0.08	16	33.5	39.4	—	MPC; JPL
2025 NQ_{548}	—	—	—	—	62.4	0.57	4	26.6	98.1	—	MPC; JPL
2025 NQ_{549}	—	—	—	—	66.3	0.47	12	35.0	97.6	—	MPC; JPL
2025 NQ_{550}	—	—	—	—	41.9	0.06	4	39.3	44.5	—	MPC; JPL
2025 NQ_{551}	—	—	—	—	44.3	0.04	3	42.4	46.3	—	MPC; JPL
2025 NQ_{552}	—	—	—	—	112.4	0.69	15	34.4	190.4	—	MPC; JPL
2025 NQ_{557}	—	—	—	—	36.5	0.36	14	23.5	49.5	—	MPC; JPL
2025 NQ_{558}	—	—	—	—	44.8	0.07	1	41.7	47.9	—	MPC; JPL
2025 NQ_{559}	—	—	—	—	56.4	0.41	5	33.2	79.7	—	MPC; JPL
2025 NQ_{560}	—	—	—	—	42.8	0.06	1	40.0	45.5	—	MPC; JPL
2025 NQ_{561}	—	—	—	—	46.9	0.31	4	32.6	61.3	—	MPC; JPL
2025 NQ_{562}	—	—	—	—	43.1	0.11	5	38.1	48.0	—	MPC; JPL
2025 NQ_{563}	—	—	—	—	56.7	0.35	24	36.9	76.5	—	MPC; JPL
2025 NR_{189}	2 July 2025	Simonyi Survey Telescope, Rubin Observatory (X05)	—	—	45.7	0.07	2	42.3	49.0	—	MPC; JPL
2025 NR_{190}	1 July 2025	Simonyi Survey Telescope, Rubin Observatory (X05)	—	—	48.9	0.17	13	40.4	57.4	—	MPC; JPL
2025 NR_{191}	1 July 2025	Simonyi Survey Telescope, Rubin Observatory (X05)	—	—	44.5	0.55	1	20.2	68.7	—	MPC; JPL
2025 NR_{192}	1 July 2025	Simonyi Survey Telescope, Rubin Observatory (X05)	—	—	43.6	0.08	3	40.3	46.9	—	MPC; JPL
2025 NR_{193}	1 July 2025	Simonyi Survey Telescope, Rubin Observatory (X05)	—	—	43.9	0.07	1	40.8	46.9	—	MPC; JPL
2025 NR_{497}	—	—	—	—	45.5	0.14	1	38.9	52.0	—	MPC; JPL
2025 NR_{547}	—	—	—	—	70.1	0.64	4	25.3	115.0	—	MPC; JPL
2025 NR_{548}	—	—	—	—	100.7	0.76	20	23.7	177.7	—	MPC; JPL
2025 NR_{549}	—	—	—	—	92.3	0.58	10	38.5	146.1	—	MPC; JPL
2025 NR_{550}	—	—	—	—	48.3	0.14	13	41.5	55.0	—	MPC; JPL
2025 NR_{551}	—	—	—	—	65.7	0.44	7	37.1	94.3	—	MPC; JPL
2025 NR_{557}	—	—	—	—	38.6	0.16	4	32.5	44.7	—	MPC; JPL
2025 NR_{558}	—	—	—	—	42.8	0.09	23	38.9	46.7	—	MPC; JPL
2025 NR_{559}	—	—	—	—	80.7	0.69	20	24.9	136.4	—	MPC; JPL
2025 NR_{560}	—	—	—	—	43.1	0.15	17	36.5	49.7	—	MPC; JPL
2025 NR_{561}	—	—	—	—	45.5	0.04	3	43.7	47.2	—	MPC; JPL
2025 NR_{562}	—	—	—	—	50.1	0.25	31	37.7	62.5	—	MPC; JPL
2025 NR_{563}	—	—	—	—	73.7	0.52	26	35.0	112.3	—	MPC; JPL
2025 NS_{189}	2 July 2025	Simonyi Survey Telescope, Rubin Observatory (X05)	—	—	45.4	0.14	6	39.1	51.7	—	MPC; JPL
2025 NS_{190}	2 July 2025	Simonyi Survey Telescope, Rubin Observatory (X05)	—	—	45.0	0.14	5	38.7	51.3	—	MPC; JPL
2025 NS_{191}	2 July 2025	Simonyi Survey Telescope, Rubin Observatory (X05)	—	—	43.3	0.10	9	38.9	47.7	—	MPC; JPL
2025 NS_{192}	11 July 2025	Simonyi Survey Telescope, Rubin Observatory (X05)	—	—	43.3	0.07	8	40.2	46.5	—	MPC; JPL
2025 NS_{193}	2 July 2025	Simonyi Survey Telescope, Rubin Observatory (X05)	—	—	42.4	0.18	12	34.7	50.1	—	MPC; JPL
2025 NS_{497}	—	—	—	—	44.6	0.14	5	38.3	50.9	—	MPC; JPL
2025 NS_{546}	—	—	—	—	65.4	0.65	5	23.2	107.6	—	MPC; JPL
2025 NS_{547}	—	—	—	—	37.9	0.34	6	25.0	50.9	—	MPC; JPL
2025 NS_{548}	—	—	—	—	67.0	0.57	14	28.9	105.1	—	MPC; JPL
2025 NS_{549}	—	—	—	—	42.8	0.16	6	35.9	49.7	—	MPC; JPL
2025 NS_{550}	—	—	—	—	104.4	0.73	8	28.0	180.8	—	MPC; JPL
2025 NS_{551}	—	—	—	—	50.2	0.20	3	40.3	60.1	—	MPC; JPL
2025 NS_{557}	—	—	—	—	44.1	0.15	4	37.6	50.7	—	MPC; JPL
2025 NS_{558}	—	—	—	—	38.7	0.21	12	30.6	46.8	—	MPC; JPL
2025 NS_{559}	—	—	—	—	44.5	0.06	2	41.9	47.1	—	MPC; JPL
2025 NS_{560}	—	—	—	—	51.1	0.28	12	37.0	65.2	—	MPC; JPL
2025 NS_{561}	—	—	—	—	44.4	0.20	4	35.5	53.2	—	MPC; JPL
2025 NS_{562}	—	—	—	—	64.7	0.44	12	35.9	93.4	—	MPC; JPL
2025 NS_{563}	—	—	—	—	45.4	0.42	19	26.5	64.4	—	MPC; JPL
2025 NS_{88}	14 July 2025	Simonyi Survey Telescope, Rubin Observatory (X05)	—	—	38.2	0.22	5	29.9	46.5	—	MPC; JPL
2025 NT_{189}	2 July 2025	Simonyi Survey Telescope, Rubin Observatory (X05)	—	—	45.2	0.21	9	35.8	54.7	—	MPC; JPL
2025 NT_{190}	1 July 2025	Simonyi Survey Telescope, Rubin Observatory (X05)	—	—	51.5	0.22	17	40.3	62.7	—	MPC; JPL
2025 NT_{192}	2 July 2025	Simonyi Survey Telescope, Rubin Observatory (X05)	—	—	150.2	0.79	27	32.1	268.2	—	MPC; JPL
2025 NT_{193}	11 July 2025	Simonyi Survey Telescope, Rubin Observatory (X05)	—	—	40.1	0.11	13	35.9	44.3	—	MPC; JPL
2025 NT_{497}	—	—	—	—	60.0	0.65	4	21.2	98.8	—	MPC; JPL
2025 NT_{546}	—	—	—	—	34.3	0.30	8	23.9	44.6	—	MPC; JPL
2025 NT_{547}	—	—	—	—	235.8	0.89	9	25.3	446.3	—	MPC; JPL
2025 NT_{548}	—	—	—	—	45.3	0.51	8	22.1	68.5	—	MPC; JPL
2025 NT_{549}	—	—	—	—	41.9	0.23	27	32.0	51.7	—	MPC; JPL
2025 NT_{550}	—	—	—	—	43.5	0.07	4	40.5	46.5	—	MPC; JPL
2025 NT_{551}	—	—	—	—	44.5	0.04	12	42.6	46.3	—	MPC; JPL
2025 NT_{557}	—	—	—	—	38.1	0.21	5	30.0	46.2	—	MPC; JPL
2025 NT_{558}	—	—	—	—	43.1	0.07	24	40.3	45.9	—	MPC; JPL
2025 NT_{559}	—	—	—	—	41.2	0.15	18	35.2	47.3	—	MPC; JPL
2025 NT_{560}	—	—	—	—	53.2	0.33	8	35.7	70.6	—	MPC; JPL
2025 NT_{561}	—	—	—	—	47.0	0.24	13	35.7	58.3	—	MPC; JPL
2025 NT_{562}	—	—	—	—	36.5	0.07	7	33.9	39.1	—	MPC; JPL
2025 NT_{563}	—	—	—	—	66.3	0.49	15	33.7	98.8	—	MPC; JPL
2025 NU_{189}	7 July 2025	Simonyi Survey Telescope, Rubin Observatory (X05)	—	—	41.4	0.12	17	36.6	46.3	—	MPC; JPL
2025 NU_{190}	2 July 2025	Simonyi Survey Telescope, Rubin Observatory (X05)	—	—	40.9	0.14	15	35.2	46.7	—	MPC; JPL
2025 NU_{191}	1 July 2025	Simonyi Survey Telescope, Rubin Observatory (X05)	—	—	62.1	0.60	21	25.1	99.0	—	MPC; JPL
2025 NU_{192}	7 July 2025	Simonyi Survey Telescope, Rubin Observatory (X05)	—	—	43.9	0.10	3	39.6	48.2	—	MPC; JPL
2025 NU_{193}	2 July 2025	Simonyi Survey Telescope, Rubin Observatory (X05)	—	—	47.7	0.12	16	41.8	53.5	—	MPC; JPL
2025 NU_{547}	—	—	—	—	37.6	0.26	6	27.8	47.5	—	MPC; JPL
2025 NU_{548}	—	—	—	—	42.9	0.13	12	37.4	48.4	—	MPC; JPL
2025 NU_{549}	—	—	—	—	63.5	0.45	12	35.2	91.8	—	MPC; JPL
2025 NU_{550}	—	—	—	—	116.4	0.83	1	20.3	212.6	—	MPC; JPL
2025 NU_{551}	—	—	—	—	41.9	0.12	18	36.7	47.1	—	MPC; JPL
2025 NU_{557}	—	—	—	—	75.2	0.78	5	16.3	134.1	—	MPC; JPL
2025 NU_{558}	—	—	—	—	37.8	0.27	1	27.4	48.1	—	MPC; JPL
2025 NU_{559}	—	—	—	—	38.9	0.17	24	32.5	45.3	—	MPC; JPL
2025 NU_{560}	—	—	—	—	58.3	0.41	5	34.3	82.2	—	MPC; JPL
2025 NU_{562}	—	—	—	—	42.0	0.16	27	35.3	48.7	—	MPC; JPL
2025 NU_{563}	—	—	—	—	43.1	0.02	3	42.1	44.2	—	MPC; JPL
2025 NV_{189}	1 July 2025	Simonyi Survey Telescope, Rubin Observatory (X05)	—	—	43.8	0.05	13	41.6	45.9	—	MPC; JPL
2025 NV_{190}	2 July 2025	Simonyi Survey Telescope, Rubin Observatory (X05)	—	—	59.7	0.42	16	34.6	84.9	—	MPC; JPL
2025 NV_{191}	1 July 2025	Simonyi Survey Telescope, Rubin Observatory (X05)	—	—	41.5	0.06	5	39.0	44.0	—	MPC; JPL
2025 NV_{192}	7 July 2025	Simonyi Survey Telescope, Rubin Observatory (X05)	—	—	90.3	0.61	37	35.4	145.2	—	MPC; JPL
2025 NV_{193}	4 July 2025	Simonyi Survey Telescope, Rubin Observatory (X05)	—	—	62.2	0.44	5	35.0	89.3	—	MPC; JPL
2025 NV_{547}	—	—	—	—	45.4	0.30	7	31.9	58.9	—	MPC; JPL
2025 NV_{548}	—	—	—	—	43.1	0.12	13	38.0	48.1	—	MPC; JPL
2025 NV_{549}	—	—	—	—	48.1	0.24	13	36.8	59.5	—	MPC; JPL
2025 NV_{550}	—	—	—	—	56.9	0.28	2	40.7	73.1	—	MPC; JPL
2025 NV_{551}	—	—	—	—	53.8	0.34	28	35.7	71.9	—	MPC; JPL
2025 NV_{557}	—	—	—	—	40.8	0.08	3	37.5	44.2	—	MPC; JPL
2025 NV_{558}	—	—	—	—	42.5	0.31	3	29.3	55.6	—	MPC; JPL
2025 NV_{559}	—	—	—	—	94.0	0.75	19	23.4	164.5	—	MPC; JPL
2025 NV_{560}	—	—	—	—	52.7	0.13	7	45.6	59.8	—	MPC; JPL
2025 NV_{561}	—	—	—	—	44.2	0.13	4	38.6	49.7	—	MPC; JPL
2025 NV_{562}	—	—	—	—	65.9	0.45	9	36.1	95.7	—	MPC; JPL
2025 NW_{188}	1 July 2025	Simonyi Survey Telescope, Rubin Observatory (X05)	—	—	43.3	0.07	5	40.2	46.5	—	MPC; JPL
2025 NW_{189}	1 July 2025	Simonyi Survey Telescope, Rubin Observatory (X05)	—	—	43.9	0.04	3	42.2	45.7	—	MPC; JPL
2025 NW_{190}	2 July 2025	Simonyi Survey Telescope, Rubin Observatory (X05)	—	—	45.4	0.08	9	41.7	49.1	—	MPC; JPL
2025 NW_{191}	11 July 2025	Simonyi Survey Telescope, Rubin Observatory (X05)	—	—	44.7	0.14	2	38.4	51.1	—	MPC; JPL
2025 NW_{192}	2 July 2025	Simonyi Survey Telescope, Rubin Observatory (X05)	—	—	43.7	0.07	1	40.8	46.5	—	MPC; JPL
2025 NW_{193}	2 July 2025	Simonyi Survey Telescope, Rubin Observatory (X05)	—	—	74.9	0.56	22	33.3	116.6	—	MPC; JPL
2025 NW_{519}	—	—	—	—	40.1	0.12	28	35.4	44.8	—	MPC; JPL
2025 NW_{546}	—	—	—	—	55.0	0.71	26	16.1	93.9	—	MPC; JPL
2025 NW_{547}	—	—	—	—	61.5	0.44	7	34.1	88.8	—	MPC; JPL
2025 NW_{548}	—	—	—	—	46.7	0.20	3	37.4	56.1	—	MPC; JPL
2025 NW_{549}	—	—	—	—	38.1	0.18	21	31.3	44.9	—	MPC; JPL
2025 NW_{550}	—	—	—	—	47.3	0.32	7	32.2	62.4	—	MPC; JPL
2025 NW_{551}	—	—	—	—	44.4	0.29	11	31.5	57.2	—	MPC; JPL
2025 NW_{557}	—	—	—	—	49.0	0.31	10	33.9	64.1	—	MPC; JPL
2025 NW_{558}	—	—	—	—	54.7	0.58	1	22.8	86.5	—	MPC; JPL
2025 NW_{559}	—	—	—	—	42.4	0.14	24	36.3	48.4	—	MPC; JPL
2025 NW_{560}	—	—	—	—	42.0	0.10	2	37.9	46.2	—	MPC; JPL
2025 NW_{561}	—	—	—	—	48.6	0.28	4	35.0	62.1	—	MPC; JPL
2025 NW_{562}	—	—	—	—	43.9	0.16	32	36.9	51.0	—	MPC; JPL
2025 NX_{188}	2 July 2025	Simonyi Survey Telescope, Rubin Observatory (X05)	—	—	68.2	0.50	2	34.4	102.0	—	MPC; JPL
2025 NX_{189}	1 July 2025	Simonyi Survey Telescope, Rubin Observatory (X05)	—	—	58.0	0.36	14	37.4	78.6	—	MPC; JPL
2025 NX_{190}	2 July 2025	Simonyi Survey Telescope, Rubin Observatory (X05)	—	—	35.1	0.07	3	32.7	37.6	—	MPC; JPL
2025 NX_{191}	1 July 2025	Simonyi Survey Telescope, Rubin Observatory (X05)	—	—	84.3	0.63	8	31.2	137.5	—	MPC; JPL
2025 NX_{192}	2 July 2025	Simonyi Survey Telescope, Rubin Observatory (X05)	—	—	59.5	0.35	16	38.7	80.2	—	MPC; JPL
2025 NX_{193}	1 July 2025	Simonyi Survey Telescope, Rubin Observatory (X05)	—	—	64.4	0.30	9	45.0	83.8	—	MPC; JPL
2025 NX_{546}	—	—	—	—	33.4	0.10	16	30.0	36.8	—	MPC; JPL
2025 NX_{547}	—	—	—	—	44.7	0.22	6	34.8	54.6	—	MPC; JPL
2025 NX_{548}	—	—	—	—	65.0	0.41	18	38.1	91.9	—	MPC; JPL
2025 NX_{549}	—	—	—	—	45.2	0.22	9	35.5	55.0	—	MPC; JPL
2025 NX_{550}	—	—	—	—	39.8	0.11	13	35.6	44.0	—	MPC; JPL
2025 NX_{551}	—	—	—	—	85.2	0.81	2	16.2	154.3	—	MPC; JPL
2025 NX_{557}	—	—	—	—	36.9	0.09	7	33.7	40.1	—	MPC; JPL
2025 NX_{558}	—	—	—	—	41.0	0.09	25	37.5	44.5	—	MPC; JPL
2025 NX_{559}	—	—	—	—	42.4	0.24	5	32.4	52.4	—	MPC; JPL
2025 NX_{560}	—	—	—	—	119.4	0.71	9	34.1	204.7	—	MPC; JPL
2025 NX_{561}	—	—	—	—	42.5	0.04	4	40.8	44.3	—	MPC; JPL
2025 NX_{562}	—	—	—	—	47.1	0.29	3	33.3	60.9	—	MPC; JPL
2025 NY_{188}	7 July 2025	Simonyi Survey Telescope, Rubin Observatory (X05)	—	—	42.5	0.07	4	39.4	45.5	—	MPC; JPL
2025 NY_{190}	2 July 2025	Simonyi Survey Telescope, Rubin Observatory (X05)	—	—	47.7	0.17	10	39.5	55.9	—	MPC; JPL
2025 NY_{191}	1 July 2025	Simonyi Survey Telescope, Rubin Observatory (X05)	—	—	44.9	0.23	18	34.8	55.0	—	MPC; JPL
2025 NY_{192}	1 July 2025	Simonyi Survey Telescope, Rubin Observatory (X05)	—	—	50.2	0.36	7	32.3	68.1	—	MPC; JPL
2025 NY_{193}	1 July 2025	Simonyi Survey Telescope, Rubin Observatory (X05)	—	—	84.4	0.52	1	40.2	128.7	—	MPC; JPL
2025 NY_{546}	—	—	—	—	38.4	0.22	13	30.0	46.7	—	MPC; JPL
2025 NY_{547}	—	—	—	—	32.7	0.10	15	29.4	36.0	—	MPC; JPL
2025 NY_{548}	—	—	—	—	40.0	0.19	36	32.3	47.7	—	MPC; JPL
2025 NY_{549}	—	—	—	—	41.9	0.08	15	38.5	45.4	—	MPC; JPL
2025 NY_{550}	—	—	—	—	38.7	0.10	17	34.8	42.6	—	MPC; JPL
2025 NY_{551}	—	—	—	—	42.6	0.10	24	38.3	46.9	—	MPC; JPL
2025 NY_{557}	—	—	—	—	93.8	0.62	10	36.0	151.5	—	MPC; JPL
2025 NY_{558}	—	—	—	—	37.7	0.29	15	26.7	48.6	—	MPC; JPL
2025 NY_{560}	—	—	—	—	59.8	0.33	17	40.0	79.7	—	MPC; JPL
2025 NY_{561}	—	—	—	—	52.3	0.36	1	33.4	71.1	—	MPC; JPL
2025 NY_{562}	—	—	—	—	56.9	0.48	7	29.8	84.0	—	MPC; JPL
2025 NZ_{188}	1 July 2025	Simonyi Survey Telescope, Rubin Observatory (X05)	—	—	43.8	0.10	2	39.2	48.3	—	MPC; JPL
2025 NZ_{189}	1 July 2025	Simonyi Survey Telescope, Rubin Observatory (X05)	—	—	43.8	0.09	4	39.7	47.8	—	MPC; JPL
2025 NZ_{190}	1 July 2025	Simonyi Survey Telescope, Rubin Observatory (X05)	—	—	42.8	0.05	3	40.9	44.7	—	MPC; JPL
2025 NZ_{191}	1 July 2025	Simonyi Survey Telescope, Rubin Observatory (X05)	—	—	50.0	0.25	0	37.8	62.3	—	MPC; JPL
2025 NZ_{192}	11 July 2025	Simonyi Survey Telescope, Rubin Observatory (X05)	—	—	43.7	0.15	2	37.3	50.1	—	MPC; JPL
2025 NZ_{193}	7 July 2025	Simonyi Survey Telescope, Rubin Observatory (X05)	—	—	80.4	0.50	6	40.4	120.4	—	MPC; JPL
2025 NZ_{253}	—	—	—	—	36.5	0.80	25	7.4	65.7	—	MPC; JPL
2025 NZ_{546}	—	—	—	—	30.8	0.06	18	29.0	32.6	—	MPC; JPL
2025 NZ_{547}	—	—	—	—	34.5	0.10	26	31.0	37.9	—	MPC; JPL
2025 NZ_{548}	—	—	—	—	49.0	0.23	7	37.7	60.3	—	MPC; JPL
2025 NZ_{549}	—	—	—	—	43.1	0.11	20	38.4	47.9	—	MPC; JPL
2025 NZ_{550}	—	—	—	—	48.1	0.18	7	39.6	56.5	—	MPC; JPL
2025 NZ_{551}	—	—	—	—	47.2	0.05	9	44.7	49.6	—	MPC; JPL
2025 NZ_{557}	—	—	—	—	51.0	0.30	10	35.6	66.4	—	MPC; JPL
2025 NZ_{558}	—	—	—	—	46.0	0.18	8	37.9	54.1	—	MPC; JPL
2025 NZ_{559}	—	—	—	—	51.5	0.45	24	28.5	74.6	—	MPC; JPL
2025 NZ_{560}	—	—	—	—	37.1	0.24	9	28.2	46.0	—	MPC; JPL
2025 NZ_{561}	—	—	—	—	52.0	0.32	7	35.2	68.8	—	MPC; JPL
2025 NZ_{562}	—	—	—	—	39.5	0.05	15	37.7	41.3	—	MPC; JPL
2025 OA_{142}	18 July 2025	Simonyi Survey Telescope, Rubin Observatory (X05)	—	—	39.3	0.24	4	29.9	48.6	—	MPC; JPL
2025 OA_{343}	18 July 2025	Simonyi Survey Telescope, Rubin Observatory (X05)	—	—	44.7	0.25	3	33.4	56.1	—	MPC; JPL
2025 OA_{344}	19 July 2025	Simonyi Survey Telescope, Rubin Observatory (X05)	—	—	75.8	0.60	27	30.0	121.5	—	MPC; JPL
2025 OA_{345}	18 July 2025	Simonyi Survey Telescope, Rubin Observatory (X05)	—	—	51.6	0.26	3	38.5	64.8	—	MPC; JPL
2025 OA_{697}	—	—	—	—	30.4	0.07	20	28.4	32.5	—	MPC; JPL
2025 OA_{698}	—	—	—	—	45.7	0.20	26	36.5	55.0	—	MPC; JPL
2025 OA_{737}	—	—	—	—	45.7	0.25	4	34.2	57.1	—	MPC; JPL
2025 OB_{160}	18 July 2025	Simonyi Survey Telescope, Rubin Observatory (X05)	—	—	37.7	0.20	7	30.2	45.3	—	MPC; JPL
2025 OB_{343}	18 July 2025	Simonyi Survey Telescope, Rubin Observatory (X05)	—	—	45.3	0.14	4	39.0	51.7	—	MPC; JPL
2025 OB_{344}	19 July 2025	Simonyi Survey Telescope, Rubin Observatory (X05)	—	—	39.0	0.23	16	30.3	47.8	—	MPC; JPL
2025 OB_{345}	18 July 2025	Simonyi Survey Telescope, Rubin Observatory (X05)	—	—	49.7	0.33	8	33.1	66.2	—	MPC; JPL
2025 OB_{697}	—	—	—	—	45.1	0.09	6	40.9	49.3	—	MPC; JPL
2025 OB_{698}	—	—	—	—	55.6	0.40	2	33.3	78.0	—	MPC; JPL
2025 OB_{737}	—	—	—	—	39.7	0.04	26	38.2	41.1	—	MPC; JPL
2025 OB_{742}	—	—	—	—	44.1	0.30	2	30.9	57.4	—	MPC; JPL
2025 OC_{343}	18 July 2025	Simonyi Survey Telescope, Rubin Observatory (X05)	—	—	41.3	0.04	17	39.7	42.9	—	MPC; JPL
2025 OC_{344}	18 July 2025	Simonyi Survey Telescope, Rubin Observatory (X05)	—	—	42.3	0.24	8	32.4	52.2	—	MPC; JPL
2025 OC_{345}	19 July 2025	Simonyi Survey Telescope, Rubin Observatory (X05)	—	—	110.7	0.79	24	23.1	198.3	—	MPC; JPL
2025 OC_{697}	—	—	—	—	45.0	0.07	2	42.0	48.1	—	MPC; JPL
2025 OC_{698}	—	—	—	—	46.5	0.12	26	41.0	52.0	—	MPC; JPL
2025 OC_{737}	—	—	—	—	48.4	0.22	2	37.6	59.2	—	MPC; JPL
2025 OC_{742}	—	—	—	—	56.3	0.56	2	25.0	87.6	—	MPC; JPL
2025 OD_{150}	18 July 2025	Simonyi Survey Telescope, Rubin Observatory (X05)	—	—	40.0	0.21	19	31.7	48.3	—	MPC; JPL
2025 OD_{343}	18 July 2025	Simonyi Survey Telescope, Rubin Observatory (X05)	—	—	60.5	0.54	13	27.9	93.1	—	MPC; JPL
2025 OD_{345}	18 July 2025	Simonyi Survey Telescope, Rubin Observatory (X05)	—	—	96.1	0.64	12	34.4	157.7	—	MPC; JPL
2025 OD_{697}	—	—	—	—	72.0	0.53	13	33.6	110.4	—	MPC; JPL
2025 OD_{737}	—	—	—	—	47.7	0.28	3	34.3	61.2	—	MPC; JPL
2025 OD_{742}	—	—	—	—	50.2	0.17	19	41.6	58.8	—	MPC; JPL
2025 OE_{343}	18 July 2025	Simonyi Survey Telescope, Rubin Observatory (X05)	—	—	44.4	0.20	2	35.4	53.4	—	MPC; JPL
2025 OE_{344}	19 July 2025	Simonyi Survey Telescope, Rubin Observatory (X05)	—	—	98.9	0.74	25	25.9	171.8	—	MPC; JPL
2025 OE_{345}	18 July 2025	Simonyi Survey Telescope, Rubin Observatory (X05)	—	—	39.3	0.22	8	30.7	47.8	—	MPC; JPL
2025 OE_{697}	—	—	—	—	42.4	0.21	5	33.6	51.2	—	MPC; JPL
2025 OE_{736}	—	—	—	—	41.2	0.10	3	37.1	45.2	—	MPC; JPL
2025 OE_{737}	—	—	—	—	37.0	0.17	5	30.5	43.4	—	MPC; JPL
2025 OE_{742}	—	—	—	—	46.6	0.35	2	30.1	63.1	—	MPC; JPL
2025 OF_{343}	19 July 2025	Simonyi Survey Telescope, Rubin Observatory (X05)	—	—	113.2	0.65	28	39.6	186.7	—	MPC; JPL
2025 OF_{344}	19 July 2025	Simonyi Survey Telescope, Rubin Observatory (X05)	—	—	49.9	0.31	12	34.2	65.5	—	MPC; JPL
2025 OF_{345}	18 July 2025	Simonyi Survey Telescope, Rubin Observatory (X05)	—	—	43.0	0.20	25	34.4	51.7	—	MPC; JPL
2025 OF_{697}	—	—	—	—	44.8	0.10	4	40.2	49.5	—	MPC; JPL
2025 OF_{736}	—	—	—	—	41.1	0.18	22	33.8	48.5	—	MPC; JPL
2025 OF_{737}	—	—	—	—	122.7	0.77	12	27.8	217.5	—	MPC; JPL
2025 OF_{742}	—	—	—	—	60.0	0.47	15	31.8	88.1	—	MPC; JPL
2025 OG_{343}	18 July 2025	Simonyi Survey Telescope, Rubin Observatory (X05)	—	—	63.6	0.41	12	37.5	89.7	—	MPC; JPL
2025 OG_{344}	18 July 2025	Simonyi Survey Telescope, Rubin Observatory (X05)	—	—	46.4	0.17	5	38.6	54.2	—	MPC; JPL
2025 OG_{345}	18 July 2025	Simonyi Survey Telescope, Rubin Observatory (X05)	—	—	76.3	0.70	49	22.8	129.9	—	MPC; JPL
2025 OG_{697}	—	—	—	—	39.3	0.10	4	35.3	43.3	—	MPC; JPL
2025 OG_{736}	—	—	—	—	68.1	0.37	11	42.9	93.2	—	MPC; JPL
2025 OG_{737}	—	—	—	—	44.2	0.06	5	41.7	46.7	—	MPC; JPL
2025 OG_{742}	—	—	—	—	44.3	0.21	28	35.0	53.6	—	MPC; JPL
2025 OH_{343}	18 July 2025	Simonyi Survey Telescope, Rubin Observatory (X05)	—	—	43.9	0.06	2	41.4	46.5	—	MPC; JPL
2025 OH_{344}	19 July 2025	Simonyi Survey Telescope, Rubin Observatory (X05)	—	—	51.5	0.29	5	36.9	66.2	—	MPC; JPL
2025 OH_{345}	18 July 2025	Simonyi Survey Telescope, Rubin Observatory (X05)	—	—	38.7	0.29	10	27.6	49.8	—	MPC; JPL
2025 OH_{697}	—	—	—	—	52.1	0.41	27	30.9	73.3	—	MPC; JPL
2025 OH_{736}	—	—	—	—	40.4	0.25	16	30.3	50.5	—	MPC; JPL
2025 OH_{737}	—	—	—	—	46.7	0.24	1	35.6	57.7	—	MPC; JPL
2025 OH_{742}	—	—	—	—	106.7	0.68	25	34.0	179.4	—	MPC; JPL
2025 OJ_{342}	18 July 2025	Simonyi Survey Telescope, Rubin Observatory (X05)	—	—	48.4	0.29	8	34.3	62.5	—	MPC; JPL
2025 OJ_{344}	18 July 2025	Simonyi Survey Telescope, Rubin Observatory (X05)	—	—	51.6	0.31	22	35.6	67.6	—	MPC; JPL
2025 OJ_{345}	18 July 2025	Simonyi Survey Telescope, Rubin Observatory (X05)	—	—	48.8	0.23	6	37.5	60.2	—	MPC; JPL
2025 OJ_{697}	—	—	—	—	61.7	0.52	7	29.9	93.4	—	MPC; JPL
2025 OJ_{736}	—	—	—	—	44.3	0.05	2	41.9	46.7	—	MPC; JPL
2025 OJ_{737}	—	—	—	—	44.3	0.12	3	38.9	49.7	—	MPC; JPL
2025 OJ_{742}	—	—	—	—	48.9	0.17	3	40.4	57.4	—	MPC; JPL
2025 OK_{144}	18 July 2025	Simonyi Survey Telescope, Rubin Observatory (X05)	—	—	38.0	0.20	7	30.6	45.4	—	MPC; JPL
2025 OK_{342}	19 July 2025	Simonyi Survey Telescope, Rubin Observatory (X05)	—	—	43.5	0.11	2	38.9	48.0	—	MPC; JPL
2025 OK_{344}	18 July 2025	Simonyi Survey Telescope, Rubin Observatory (X05)	—	—	43.5	0.06	3	41.0	45.9	—	MPC; JPL
2025 OK_{345}	18 July 2025	Simonyi Survey Telescope, Rubin Observatory (X05)	—	—	43.6	0.15	2	36.9	50.4	—	MPC; JPL
2025 OK_{697}	—	—	—	—	285.5	0.93	34	20.9	550.1	—	MPC; JPL
2025 OK_{736}	—	—	—	—	43.1	0.10	2	38.8	47.5	—	MPC; JPL
2025 OK_{737}	—	—	—	—	44.6	0.30	8	31.3	57.8	—	MPC; JPL
2025 OK_{742}	—	—	—	—	73.2	0.31	10	50.4	96.0	—	MPC; JPL
2025 OL_{158}	18 July 2025	Simonyi Survey Telescope, Rubin Observatory (X05)	—	—	45.4	0.21	23	35.9	54.9	—	MPC; JPL
2025 OL_{342}	22 July 2025	Simonyi Survey Telescope, Rubin Observatory (X05)	—	—	31.8	0.28	2	22.8	40.7	—	MPC; JPL
2025 OL_{343}	18 July 2025	Simonyi Survey Telescope, Rubin Observatory (X05)	—	—	47.2	0.25	2	35.2	59.1	—	MPC; JPL
2025 OL_{344}	18 July 2025	Simonyi Survey Telescope, Rubin Observatory (X05)	—	—	43.5	0.10	3	39.1	47.8	—	MPC; JPL
2025 OL_{345}	19 July 2025	Simonyi Survey Telescope, Rubin Observatory (X05)	—	—	40.2	0.13	22	35.0	45.4	—	MPC; JPL
2025 OL_{697}	—	—	—	—	37.8	0.10	36	33.9	41.8	—	MPC; JPL
2025 OL_{737}	—	—	—	—	47.9	0.35	16	31.2	64.6	—	MPC; JPL
2025 OM_{342}	18 July 2025	Simonyi Survey Telescope, Rubin Observatory (X05)	—	—	41.5	0.23	3	32.0	51.0	—	MPC; JPL
2025 OM_{343}	18 July 2025	Simonyi Survey Telescope, Rubin Observatory (X05)	—	—	42.5	0.03	1	41.3	43.8	—	MPC; JPL
2025 OM_{344}	19 July 2025	Simonyi Survey Telescope, Rubin Observatory (X05)	—	—	45.1	0.24	14	34.2	56.1	—	MPC; JPL
2025 OM_{345}	19 July 2025	Simonyi Survey Telescope, Rubin Observatory (X05)	—	—	90.8	0.56	42	39.6	142.0	—	MPC; JPL
2025 OM_{697}	—	—	—	—	43.8	0.15	31	37.0	50.5	—	MPC; JPL
2025 OM_{737}	—	—	—	—	44.6	0.13	3	38.7	50.6	—	MPC; JPL
2025 ON_{342}	18 July 2025	Simonyi Survey Telescope, Rubin Observatory (X05)	—	—	43.2	0.03	3	42.0	44.4	—	MPC; JPL
2025 ON_{343}	18 July 2025	Simonyi Survey Telescope, Rubin Observatory (X05)	—	—	44.4	0.09	4	40.6	48.2	—	MPC; JPL
2025 ON_{344}	18 July 2025	Simonyi Survey Telescope, Rubin Observatory (X05)	—	—	90.4	0.64	10	32.1	148.6	—	MPC; JPL
2025 ON_{345}	18 July 2025	Simonyi Survey Telescope, Rubin Observatory (X05)	—	—	81.4	0.61	15	31.6	131.1	—	MPC; JPL
2025 ON_{697}	—	—	—	—	68.8	0.58	6	29.0	108.6	—	MPC; JPL
2025 ON_{737}	—	—	—	—	60.2	0.48	3	31.1	89.4	—	MPC; JPL
2025 OO_{1}	22 July 2025	Pan-STARRS 2 (F52)	318	SDO	52.7	0.26	20	38.9	66.5	albedo: 0.124	MPC; JPL
2025 OO_{342}	19 July 2025	Simonyi Survey Telescope, Rubin Observatory (X05)	—	—	34.8	0.08	3	32.0	37.6	—	MPC; JPL
2025 OO_{343}	18 July 2025	Simonyi Survey Telescope, Rubin Observatory (X05)	—	—	94.4	0.63	25	35.3	153.5	—	MPC; JPL
2025 OO_{344}	18 July 2025	Simonyi Survey Telescope, Rubin Observatory (X05)	—	—	39.9	0.07	25	37.2	42.6	—	MPC; JPL
2025 OO_{345}	18 July 2025	Simonyi Survey Telescope, Rubin Observatory (X05)	—	—	54.1	0.29	7	38.2	70.0	—	MPC; JPL
2025 OO_{697}	—	—	—	—	40.3	0.18	6	33.1	47.4	—	MPC; JPL
2025 OO_{737}	—	—	—	—	47.7	0.05	3	45.5	49.9	—	MPC; JPL
2025 OP_{342}	18 July 2025	Simonyi Survey Telescope, Rubin Observatory (X05)	—	—	44.5	0.05	5	42.4	46.7	—	MPC; JPL
2025 OP_{343}	18 July 2025	Simonyi Survey Telescope, Rubin Observatory (X05)	—	—	42.3	0.17	16	35.0	49.6	—	MPC; JPL
2025 OP_{344}	19 July 2025	Simonyi Survey Telescope, Rubin Observatory (X05)	—	—	43.8	0.07	3	40.8	46.7	—	MPC; JPL
2025 OP_{345}	18 July 2025	Simonyi Survey Telescope, Rubin Observatory (X05)	—	—	107.9	0.77	21	24.4	191.5	—	MPC; JPL
2025 OP_{697}	—	—	—	—	61.3	0.58	5	25.9	96.6	—	MPC; JPL
2025 OP_{736}	—	—	—	—	36.7	0.19	9	29.8	43.5	—	MPC; JPL
2025 OP_{737}	—	—	—	—	43.8	0.14	2	37.5	50.1	—	MPC; JPL
2025 OQ_{145}	18 July 2025	Simonyi Survey Telescope, Rubin Observatory (X05)	—	—	43.1	0.10	11	38.9	47.4	—	MPC; JPL
2025 OQ_{342}	18 July 2025	Simonyi Survey Telescope, Rubin Observatory (X05)	—	—	58.9	0.47	3	31.5	86.2	—	MPC; JPL
2025 OQ_{343}	18 July 2025	Simonyi Survey Telescope, Rubin Observatory (X05)	—	—	57.7	0.41	17	34.2	81.3	—	MPC; JPL
2025 OQ_{344}	21 July 2025	Simonyi Survey Telescope, Rubin Observatory (X05)	—	—	45.1	0.20	3	36.1	54.2	—	MPC; JPL
2025 OQ_{345}	18 July 2025	Simonyi Survey Telescope, Rubin Observatory (X05)	—	—	49.7	0.52	6	24.0	75.4	—	MPC; JPL
2025 OQ_{697}	—	—	—	—	223.9	0.87	13	29.3	418.5	—	MPC; JPL
2025 OQ_{736}	—	—	—	—	33.6	0.54	1	15.6	51.7	—	MPC; JPL
2025 OQ_{737}	—	—	—	—	44.3	0.13	3	38.7	49.9	—	MPC; JPL
2025 OR_{342}	18 July 2025	Simonyi Survey Telescope, Rubin Observatory (X05)	—	—	43.1	0.13	26	37.6	48.6	—	MPC; JPL
2025 OR_{343}	18 July 2025	Simonyi Survey Telescope, Rubin Observatory (X05)	—	—	32.7	0.09	7	29.8	35.7	—	MPC; JPL
2025 OR_{344}	19 July 2025	Simonyi Survey Telescope, Rubin Observatory (X05)	—	—	49.3	0.20	41	39.6	58.9	—	MPC; JPL
2025 OR_{345}	19 July 2025	Simonyi Survey Telescope, Rubin Observatory (X05)	—	—	86.8	0.57	8	37.0	136.6	—	MPC; JPL
2025 OR_{697}	—	—	—	—	45.8	0.22	5	35.6	55.9	—	MPC; JPL
2025 OR_{736}	—	—	—	—	36.4	0.10	10	32.7	40.1	—	MPC; JPL
2025 OR_{737}	—	—	—	—	83.5	0.74	2	21.7	145.3	—	MPC; JPL
2025 OS_{190}	19 July 2025	Simonyi Survey Telescope, Rubin Observatory (X05)	—	—	42.2	0.18	8	34.8	49.7	—	MPC; JPL
2025 OS_{342}	18 July 2025	Simonyi Survey Telescope, Rubin Observatory (X05)	—	—	53.3	0.37	2	33.5	73.0	—	MPC; JPL
2025 OS_{343}	19 July 2025	Simonyi Survey Telescope, Rubin Observatory (X05)	—	—	50.6	0.27	7	36.9	64.4	—	MPC; JPL
2025 OS_{344}	18 July 2025	Simonyi Survey Telescope, Rubin Observatory (X05)	—	—	49.4	0.31	6	34.3	64.5	—	MPC; JPL
2025 OS_{345}	18 July 2025	Simonyi Survey Telescope, Rubin Observatory (X05)	—	—	54.0	0.48	24	28.4	79.7	—	MPC; JPL
2025 OS_{697}	—	—	—	—	47.8	0.11	16	42.7	52.8	—	MPC; JPL
2025 OS_{736}	—	—	—	—	42.3	0.21	14	33.6	51.0	—	MPC; JPL
2025 OS_{737}	—	—	—	—	56.3	0.33	8	38.0	74.7	—	MPC; JPL
2025 OT_{342}	18 July 2025	Simonyi Survey Telescope, Rubin Observatory (X05)	—	—	47.0	0.03	20	45.4	48.6	—	MPC; JPL
2025 OT_{343}	18 July 2025	Simonyi Survey Telescope, Rubin Observatory (X05)	—	—	62.1	0.50	5	31.2	93.0	—	MPC; JPL
2025 OT_{344}	19 July 2025	Simonyi Survey Telescope, Rubin Observatory (X05)	—	—	43.9	0.04	3	42.3	45.4	—	MPC; JPL
2025 OT_{345}	19 July 2025	Simonyi Survey Telescope, Rubin Observatory (X05)	—	—	45.0	0.14	2	38.8	51.2	—	MPC; JPL
2025 OT_{697}	—	—	—	—	43.6	0.03	3	42.3	44.8	—	MPC; JPL
2025 OT_{736}	—	—	—	—	47.4	0.29	6	33.7	61.0	—	MPC; JPL
2025 OU_{342}	18 July 2025	Simonyi Survey Telescope, Rubin Observatory (X05)	—	—	92.6	0.73	8	24.7	160.4	—	MPC; JPL
2025 OU_{343}	19 July 2025	Simonyi Survey Telescope, Rubin Observatory (X05)	—	—	49.8	0.15	5	42.1	57.4	—	MPC; JPL
2025 OU_{344}	18 July 2025	Simonyi Survey Telescope, Rubin Observatory (X05)	—	—	48.0	0.27	5	35.0	61.1	—	MPC; JPL
2025 OU_{697}	—	—	—	—	48.7	0.25	3	36.5	60.9	—	MPC; JPL
2025 OU_{736}	—	—	—	—	44.5	0.23	13	34.2	54.8	—	MPC; JPL
2025 OV_{342}	18 July 2025	Simonyi Survey Telescope, Rubin Observatory (X05)	—	—	52.3	0.38	7	32.7	71.9	—	MPC; JPL
2025 OV_{343}	18 July 2025	Simonyi Survey Telescope, Rubin Observatory (X05)	—	—	58.1	0.37	9	36.9	79.3	—	MPC; JPL
2025 OV_{344}	18 July 2025	Simonyi Survey Telescope, Rubin Observatory (X05)	—	—	49.3	0.35	14	32.1	66.5	—	MPC; JPL
2025 OV_{697}	—	—	—	—	717.5	0.97	11	21.9	1413.1	—	MPC; JPL
2025 OV_{736}	—	—	—	—	47.5	0.23	3	36.7	58.3	—	MPC; JPL
2025 OV_{737}	—	—	—	—	71.3	0.61	3	27.7	115.0	—	MPC; JPL
2025 OW_{342}	19 July 2025	Simonyi Survey Telescope, Rubin Observatory (X05)	—	—	116.7	0.74	13	29.9	203.6	—	MPC; JPL
2025 OW_{343}	18 July 2025	Simonyi Survey Telescope, Rubin Observatory (X05)	—	—	61.7	0.53	24	29.3	94.1	—	MPC; JPL
2025 OW_{344}	18 July 2025	Simonyi Survey Telescope, Rubin Observatory (X05)	—	—	42.5	0.05	4	40.6	44.4	—	MPC; JPL
2025 OW_{697}	—	—	—	—	52.0	0.50	3	25.9	78.1	—	MPC; JPL
2025 OW_{736}	—	—	—	—	84.6	0.67	6	27.6	141.6	—	MPC; JPL
2025 OX_{342}	19 July 2025	Simonyi Survey Telescope, Rubin Observatory (X05)	—	—	47.7	0.16	3	40.2	55.2	—	MPC; JPL
2025 OX_{343}	18 July 2025	Simonyi Survey Telescope, Rubin Observatory (X05)	—	—	46.3	0.43	8	26.3	66.3	—	MPC; JPL
2025 OX_{344}	18 July 2025	Simonyi Survey Telescope, Rubin Observatory (X05)	—	—	44.8	0.08	4	41.3	48.3	—	MPC; JPL
2025 OX_{697}	—	—	—	—	42.3	0.22	1	33.0	51.6	—	MPC; JPL
2025 OX_{736}	—	—	—	—	36.9	0.36	3	23.5	50.2	—	MPC; JPL
2025 OY_{342}	18 July 2025	Simonyi Survey Telescope, Rubin Observatory (X05)	—	—	46.7	0.27	22	34.1	59.3	—	MPC; JPL
2025 OY_{343}	19 July 2025	Simonyi Survey Telescope, Rubin Observatory (X05)	—	—	39.1	0.35	33	25.5	52.8	—	MPC; JPL
2025 OY_{344}	19 July 2025	Simonyi Survey Telescope, Rubin Observatory (X05)	—	—	57.7	0.49	13	29.3	86.0	—	MPC; JPL
2025 OY_{697}	—	—	—	—	48.7	0.30	1	34.0	63.3	—	MPC; JPL
2025 OY_{736}	—	—	—	—	312.4	0.88	11	36.8	588.0	—	MPC; JPL
2025 OZ_{342}	18 July 2025	Simonyi Survey Telescope, Rubin Observatory (X05)	—	—	43.7	0.15	7	37.3	50.1	—	MPC; JPL
2025 OZ_{343}	18 July 2025	Simonyi Survey Telescope, Rubin Observatory (X05)	—	—	137.4	0.70	24	40.8	233.9	—	MPC; JPL
2025 OZ_{344}	18 July 2025	Simonyi Survey Telescope, Rubin Observatory (X05)	—	—	47.0	0.24	13	35.5	58.4	—	MPC; JPL
2025 OZ_{697}	—	—	—	—	42.6	0.19	4	34.3	51.0	—	MPC; JPL
2025 OZ_{736}	—	—	—	—	65.5	0.55	1	29.7	101.2	—	MPC; JPL
2025 OZ_{737}	—	—	—	—	61.5	0.29	15	43.7	79.3	—	MPC; JPL
2025 PA_{2}	15 August 2025	Pan-STARRS 2 (F52)	238	other TNO	42.8	0.20	9	34.2	51.4	albedo: 0.13	MPC; JPL
2025 PV_{291}	—	—	—	—	48.4	0.26	24	35.9	60.9	—	MPC; JPL
2025 QY_{2}	16 August 2025	WFST, Lenghu (O18)	199	centaur	54.6	0.50	10	27.4	81.7	albedo: 0.058	MPC; JPL
2025 RL_{58}	—	—	—	—	32.7	0.82	12	5.9	59.4	—	MPC; JPL
2025 RY_{11}	15 September 2025	Pan-STARRS 2 (F52)	37	centaur	34.8	0.82	17	6.4	63.2	albedo: 0.058	MPC; JPL
2025 TS_{13}	12 October 2025	WFST, Lenghu (O18)	2.5	damocloid	41.4	0.93	95	3.0	79.7	albedo: 0.048	MPC; JPL
2025 TT_{13}	1 October 2025	Kitt Peak-Bok (V00)	2.8	damocloid	39.4	0.92	153	3.3	75.6	albedo: 0.048	MPC; JPL
2025 TW_{77}	—	—	—	—	45.5	0.12	8	40.0	50.9	—	MPC; JPL
2025 UK_{142}	29 October 2025	Magellan-Baade Telescope (269)	205	SDO	72.4	0.10	2	65.3	79.6	albedo: 0.124	MPC; JPL
2025 UP_{145}	29 October 2025	Magellan-Baade Telescope (269)	—	—	56.0	0.42	28	32.6	79.4	—	MPC; JPL
2025 VE_{39}	—	—	—	—	34.4	0.10	19	31.0	37.8	—	MPC; JPL
2025 VF_{39}	—	—	—	—	158.3	0.80	22	32.3	284.3	—	MPC; JPL
2025 VG_{39}	—	—	—	—	52.1	0.27	32	38.1	66.1	—	MPC; JPL
2025 VH_{39}	—	—	—	—	51.0	0.46	14	27.8	74.1	—	MPC; JPL
2025 VJ_{39}	—	—	—	—	49.5	0.24	25	37.9	61.2	—	MPC; JPL
2025 VK_{39}	—	—	—	—	42.9	0.22	28	33.2	52.5	—	MPC; JPL
2025 VL_{39}	—	—	—	—	45.2	0.10	27	40.7	49.7	—	MPC; JPL
2025 VR_{33}	14 November 2025	Magellan-Baade Telescope (269)	276	SDO	82.1	0.52	19	39.7	124.6	albedo: 0.124	MPC; JPL
2025 VR_{38}	—	—	—	—	73.2	0.67	32	24.3	122.1	—	MPC; JPL
2025 VS_{38}	—	—	—	—	68.2	0.59	24	27.9	108.5	—	MPC; JPL
2025 WF_{47}	—	—	—	—	34.8	0.82	165	6.3	63.3	—	MPC; JPL
2025 WQ_{21}	16 November 2025	Pan-STARRS 1 (F51)	6	centaur	41.0	0.86	19	5.6	76.3	albedo: 0.058	MPC; JPL
2025 WX_{46}	—	—	—	—	194.0	0.81	20	37.6	350.3	—	MPC; JPL
2025 XT_{9}	1 December 2025	Pan-STARRS 1 (F51)	1.7	centaur	36.3	0.94	16	2.1	70.5	albedo: 0.058	MPC; JPL
2025 YA_{25}	—	—	—	—	42.0	0.06	12	39.6	44.5	—	MPC; JPL
2025 YC_{23}	—	—	—	—	40.1	0.11	20	35.8	44.4	—	MPC; JPL
2025 YC_{25}	—	—	—	—	44.4	0.40	11	26.4	62.3	—	MPC; JPL
2025 YD_{25}	—	—	—	—	39.5	0.12	8	34.7	44.3	—	MPC; JPL
2025 YE_{25}	—	—	—	—	76.1	0.50	6	37.8	114.4	—	MPC; JPL
2025 YF_{25}	—	—	—	—	48.4	0.20	11	38.7	58.2	—	MPC; JPL
2025 YW_{24}	—	—	—	—	39.5	0.17	18	32.8	46.3	—	MPC; JPL
2025 YX_{24}	—	—	—	—	39.4	0.25	19	29.5	49.3	—	MPC; JPL
2025 YY_{24}	—	—	—	—	39.6	0.17	23	32.8	46.4	—	MPC; JPL
2025 YZ_{24}	—	—	—	—	44.9	0.18	33	36.7	53.1	—	MPC; JPL

back to top
