= List of minor planets: 880001–881000 =

The following is a partial list of minor planets, running from minor-planet number 880001 through 881000, inclusive. The primary data for this and other partial lists is based on JPL's "Small-Body Orbital Elements" and data available from the Minor Planet Center. Critical list information is also provided by the MPC, unless otherwise specified from Lowell Observatory. A detailed description of the table's columns and additional sources are given on the main page including a complete list of every page in this series, and a statistical break-up on the dynamical classification of minor planets.

Also see the summary list of all named bodies in numerical and alphabetical order, and the corresponding naming citations for the number range of this particular list. New namings may only be added to this list after official publication, as the preannouncement of names is condemned by the Working Group for Small Bodies Nomenclature of the International Astronomical Union.

Near-Earth obj.	MBA (inner)	MBA (outer)	Centaur
Mars-crosser	MBA (middle)	Jupiter trojan	Trans-Neptunian obj.
Unclassified

== 880001–880100 ==
Designation			Discovery			Properties		Ref
Permanent	Provisional	Named after	Date	Site	Discoverer(s)	Category	Diam.	Ref
880001	2014 OM_{436}	—	July 28, 2014	Haleakala	Pan-STARRS 1	EOS	1.3 km	MPC; JPL
880002	2014 OL_{440}	—	July 29, 2014	Haleakala	Pan-STARRS 1	·	1.4 km	MPC; JPL
880003	2014 ON_{442}	—	July 31, 2014	Haleakala	Pan-STARRS 1	·	1.2 km	MPC; JPL
880004	2014 ON_{462}	—	July 4, 2014	Haleakala	Pan-STARRS 1	JUN	660 m	MPC; JPL
880005	2014 OS_{463}	—	July 25, 2014	Haleakala	Pan-STARRS 1	·	1.3 km	MPC; JPL
880006	2014 OD_{464}	—	July 25, 2014	Haleakala	Pan-STARRS 1	·	1.3 km	MPC; JPL
880007	2014 PL_{9}	—	July 25, 2014	Haleakala	Pan-STARRS 1	·	990 m	MPC; JPL
880008	2014 PF_{13}	—	February 2, 2013	Mount Lemmon	Mount Lemmon Survey	H	390 m	MPC; JPL
880009	2014 PM_{17}	—	June 26, 2014	Haleakala	Pan-STARRS 1	·	610 m	MPC; JPL
880010	2014 PX_{23}	—	August 3, 2014	Haleakala	Pan-STARRS 1	·	1.6 km	MPC; JPL
880011	2014 PQ_{24}	—	September 22, 2003	Palomar	NEAT	·	2.4 km	MPC; JPL
880012	2014 PL_{27}	—	July 25, 2014	Haleakala	Pan-STARRS 1	·	1.3 km	MPC; JPL
880013	2014 PV_{27}	—	October 25, 2011	Haleakala	Pan-STARRS 1	·	550 m	MPC; JPL
880014	2014 PJ_{28}	—	June 23, 2014	Mount Lemmon	Mount Lemmon Survey	·	1.1 km	MPC; JPL
880015	2014 PK_{29}	—	August 4, 2014	Haleakala	Pan-STARRS 1	·	870 m	MPC; JPL
880016	2014 PV_{31}	—	July 30, 2014	Kitt Peak	Spacewatch	·	1.7 km	MPC; JPL
880017	2014 PX_{39}	—	July 28, 2014	Haleakala	Pan-STARRS 1	·	1.6 km	MPC; JPL
880018	2014 PJ_{44}	—	August 4, 2014	Haleakala	Pan-STARRS 1	·	1.1 km	MPC; JPL
880019	2014 PL_{51}	—	August 4, 2014	SONEAR	SONEAR	AMO · slow	300 m	MPC; JPL
880020	2014 PQ_{52}	—	July 26, 2014	Haleakala	Pan-STARRS 1	·	1.5 km	MPC; JPL
880021	2014 PE_{62}	—	May 25, 2014	Haleakala	Pan-STARRS 1	·	710 m	MPC; JPL
880022	2014 PK_{68}	—	June 29, 2014	Haleakala	Pan-STARRS 1	·	1.4 km	MPC; JPL
880023	2014 PO_{68}	—	July 28, 2014	Haleakala	Pan-STARRS 1	AGN	820 m	MPC; JPL
880024	2014 PN_{78}	—	June 5, 2014	Haleakala	Pan-STARRS 1	T_{j} (2.87)	3.3 km	MPC; JPL
880025	2014 PE_{81}	—	August 15, 2014	Haleakala	Pan-STARRS 1	·	1.3 km	MPC; JPL
880026	2014 PJ_{83}	—	August 4, 2014	Haleakala	Pan-STARRS 1	PHO	610 m	MPC; JPL
880027	2014 PB_{96}	—	August 3, 2014	Haleakala	Pan-STARRS 1	·	700 m	MPC; JPL
880028	2014 QE_{1}	—	September 18, 2009	Catalina	CSS	·	1.9 km	MPC; JPL
880029	2014 QQ_{1}	—	August 17, 2014	Haleakala	Pan-STARRS 1	·	1.1 km	MPC; JPL
880030	2014 QN_{5}	—	July 1, 2014	Haleakala	Pan-STARRS 1	·	1.7 km	MPC; JPL
880031	2014 QE_{10}	—	August 18, 2014	Haleakala	Pan-STARRS 1	·	820 m	MPC; JPL
880032	2014 QW_{24}	—	August 18, 2014	Haleakala	Pan-STARRS 1	·	1.1 km	MPC; JPL
880033	2014 QZ_{24}	—	August 18, 2014	Haleakala	Pan-STARRS 1	MAR	640 m	MPC; JPL
880034	2014 QG_{32}	—	June 28, 2014	Haleakala	Pan-STARRS 1	·	1.5 km	MPC; JPL
880035	2014 QS_{67}	—	August 20, 2014	Haleakala	Pan-STARRS 1	·	920 m	MPC; JPL
880036	2014 QM_{73}	—	June 5, 2014	Haleakala	Pan-STARRS 1	(2076)	690 m	MPC; JPL
880037	2014 QR_{76}	—	August 20, 2014	Haleakala	Pan-STARRS 1	·	1.2 km	MPC; JPL
880038	2014 QV_{76}	—	September 4, 2010	Mount Lemmon	Mount Lemmon Survey	·	1.0 km	MPC; JPL
880039	2014 QB_{80}	—	October 4, 2007	Kitt Peak	Spacewatch	critical	750 m	MPC; JPL
880040	2014 QY_{82}	—	August 20, 2014	Haleakala	Pan-STARRS 1	·	1.6 km	MPC; JPL
880041	2014 QP_{95}	—	August 20, 2014	Haleakala	Pan-STARRS 1	EOS	1.4 km	MPC; JPL
880042	2014 QG_{105}	—	July 25, 2014	Haleakala	Pan-STARRS 1	BRA	1.0 km	MPC; JPL
880043	2014 QJ_{110}	—	August 20, 2014	Haleakala	Pan-STARRS 1	H	370 m	MPC; JPL
880044	2014 QQ_{123}	—	July 28, 2014	Haleakala	Pan-STARRS 1	·	1.7 km	MPC; JPL
880045	2014 QA_{136}	—	August 20, 2014	Haleakala	Pan-STARRS 1	·	1.6 km	MPC; JPL
880046	2014 QQ_{137}	—	July 7, 2014	Haleakala	Pan-STARRS 1	·	1.8 km	MPC; JPL
880047	2014 QB_{141}	—	July 28, 2014	Haleakala	Pan-STARRS 1	·	1.2 km	MPC; JPL
880048	2014 QF_{147}	—	August 20, 2014	Haleakala	Pan-STARRS 1	·	1.3 km	MPC; JPL
880049	2014 QS_{151}	—	November 6, 2002	Palomar	NEAT	·	920 m	MPC; JPL
880050	2014 QY_{156}	—	June 27, 2014	Haleakala	Pan-STARRS 1	·	1.7 km	MPC; JPL
880051	2014 QC_{177}	—	August 20, 2014	Haleakala	Pan-STARRS 1	·	1.2 km	MPC; JPL
880052	2014 QY_{177}	—	September 21, 2009	Mount Lemmon	Mount Lemmon Survey	THM	1.5 km	MPC; JPL
880053	2014 QJ_{178}	—	August 20, 2014	Haleakala	Pan-STARRS 1	·	1.4 km	MPC; JPL
880054	2014 QZ_{179}	—	June 23, 2014	Mount Lemmon	Mount Lemmon Survey	·	820 m	MPC; JPL
880055	2014 QB_{202}	—	August 22, 2014	Haleakala	Pan-STARRS 1	·	1.5 km	MPC; JPL
880056	2014 QV_{213}	—	August 7, 2014	Kitt Peak	Spacewatch	·	540 m	MPC; JPL
880057	2014 QS_{219}	—	August 22, 2014	Haleakala	Pan-STARRS 1	·	1.5 km	MPC; JPL
880058	2014 QO_{221}	—	June 23, 2014	Mount Lemmon	Mount Lemmon Survey	·	640 m	MPC; JPL
880059	2014 QB_{227}	—	November 19, 2009	Catalina	CSS	·	1.5 km	MPC; JPL
880060	2014 QD_{227}	—	September 22, 2009	Kitt Peak	Spacewatch	·	1.5 km	MPC; JPL
880061	2014 QY_{227}	—	August 4, 2010	WISE	WISE	·	1.4 km	MPC; JPL
880062	2014 QX_{230}	—	August 22, 2014	Haleakala	Pan-STARRS 1	·	1.6 km	MPC; JPL
880063	2014 QE_{233}	—	August 22, 2014	Haleakala	Pan-STARRS 1	EOS	1.3 km	MPC; JPL
880064	2014 QF_{235}	—	August 20, 2014	Haleakala	Pan-STARRS 1	·	600 m	MPC; JPL
880065	2014 QF_{237}	—	July 28, 2014	Haleakala	Pan-STARRS 1	·	460 m	MPC; JPL
880066	2014 QS_{237}	—	July 7, 2014	Haleakala	Pan-STARRS 1	·	450 m	MPC; JPL
880067	2014 QB_{245}	—	August 22, 2014	Haleakala	Pan-STARRS 1	·	1.7 km	MPC; JPL
880068	2014 QL_{245}	—	February 9, 2008	Mount Lemmon	Mount Lemmon Survey	·	1.6 km	MPC; JPL
880069	2014 QQ_{247}	—	March 19, 2010	Mount Lemmon	Mount Lemmon Survey	·	610 m	MPC; JPL
880070	2014 QF_{250}	—	November 16, 2009	Mount Lemmon	Mount Lemmon Survey	·	1.4 km	MPC; JPL
880071	2014 QT_{251}	—	August 22, 2014	Haleakala	Pan-STARRS 1	·	1.6 km	MPC; JPL
880072	2014 QR_{257}	—	August 22, 2014	Haleakala	Pan-STARRS 1	·	1.6 km	MPC; JPL
880073	2014 QP_{274}	—	June 27, 2014	Haleakala	Pan-STARRS 1	·	1.6 km	MPC; JPL
880074	2014 QM_{275}	—	October 30, 2009	Mount Lemmon	Mount Lemmon Survey	·	1.2 km	MPC; JPL
880075	2014 QB_{278}	—	July 28, 2014	Haleakala	Pan-STARRS 1	NYS	920 m	MPC; JPL
880076	2014 QW_{278}	—	July 28, 2014	Haleakala	Pan-STARRS 1	·	1.6 km	MPC; JPL
880077	2014 QO_{279}	—	November 17, 2011	Mount Lemmon	Mount Lemmon Survey	·	480 m	MPC; JPL
880078	2014 QS_{292}	—	August 25, 2014	Haleakala	Pan-STARRS 1	·	1.3 km	MPC; JPL
880079	2014 QC_{293}	—	November 19, 2009	Mount Lemmon	Mount Lemmon Survey	·	2.1 km	MPC; JPL
880080	2014 QS_{296}	—	August 23, 2014	Haleakala	Pan-STARRS 1	APO	230 m	MPC; JPL
880081	2014 QG_{299}	—	July 25, 2014	Haleakala	Pan-STARRS 1	·	1.2 km	MPC; JPL
880082	2014 QY_{300}	—	October 2, 2003	Kitt Peak	Spacewatch	·	2.2 km	MPC; JPL
880083	2014 QP_{301}	—	July 31, 2014	Haleakala	Pan-STARRS 1	·	730 m	MPC; JPL
880084	2014 QD_{304}	—	October 26, 2009	Kitt Peak	Spacewatch	·	2.3 km	MPC; JPL
880085	2014 QG_{306}	—	May 3, 2008	Mount Lemmon	Mount Lemmon Survey	·	1.3 km	MPC; JPL
880086	2014 QZ_{308}	—	July 27, 2014	Haleakala	Pan-STARRS 1	·	810 m	MPC; JPL
880087	2014 QC_{321}	—	August 25, 2014	Haleakala	Pan-STARRS 1	·	550 m	MPC; JPL
880088	2014 QZ_{322}	—	August 25, 2014	Haleakala	Pan-STARRS 1	·	1.1 km	MPC; JPL
880089	2014 QH_{323}	—	October 21, 2003	Kitt Peak	Spacewatch	·	1.6 km	MPC; JPL
880090	2014 QD_{326}	—	September 15, 2006	Kitt Peak	Spacewatch	H	360 m	MPC; JPL
880091	2014 QZ_{331}	—	August 25, 2014	Haleakala	Pan-STARRS 1	EUN	680 m	MPC; JPL
880092	2014 QL_{334}	—	August 25, 2014	Haleakala	Pan-STARRS 1	H	380 m	MPC; JPL
880093	2014 QF_{335}	—	August 25, 2014	Haleakala	Pan-STARRS 1	·	1.7 km	MPC; JPL
880094	2014 QH_{345}	—	July 8, 2014	Haleakala	Pan-STARRS 1	·	1.8 km	MPC; JPL
880095	2014 QL_{361}	—	August 27, 2014	Haleakala	Pan-STARRS 1	BRA	1.1 km	MPC; JPL
880096	2014 QO_{363}	—	January 10, 2010	Črni Vrh	Mikuž, H.	T_{j} (2.92)	2.0 km	MPC; JPL
880097	2014 QZ_{363}	—	July 31, 2014	Haleakala	Pan-STARRS 1	H	390 m	MPC; JPL
880098	2014 QB_{364}	—	January 19, 2013	Kitt Peak	Spacewatch	H	440 m	MPC; JPL
880099	2014 QR_{366}	—	August 25, 2014	Haleakala	Pan-STARRS 1	·	1.6 km	MPC; JPL
880100	2014 QQ_{369}	—	August 27, 2014	Haleakala	Pan-STARRS 1	·	1.3 km	MPC; JPL

== 880101–880200 ==
back to top

Designation			Discovery			Properties		Ref
Permanent	Provisional	Named after	Date	Site	Discoverer(s)	Category	Diam.	Ref
880101	2014 QU_{369}	—	August 20, 2014	Haleakala	Pan-STARRS 1	critical	1.6 km	MPC; JPL
880102	2014 QR_{371}	—	September 13, 2007	Mount Lemmon	Mount Lemmon Survey	NYS	510 m	MPC; JPL
880103	2014 QX_{374}	—	July 30, 2014	Haleakala	Pan-STARRS 1	·	1.2 km	MPC; JPL
880104	2014 QP_{378}	—	October 30, 2010	Piszkés-tető	K. Sárneczky, Z. Kuli	·	880 m	MPC; JPL
880105	2014 QS_{378}	—	July 30, 2014	Haleakala	Pan-STARRS 1	·	1.5 km	MPC; JPL
880106	2014 QX_{385}	—	August 29, 2014	Mount Lemmon	Mount Lemmon Survey	·	1.9 km	MPC; JPL
880107	2014 QH_{386}	—	August 31, 2005	Anderson Mesa	LONEOS	·	1.3 km	MPC; JPL
880108	2014 QL_{399}	—	August 22, 2003	Palomar	NEAT	·	1.7 km	MPC; JPL
880109	2014 QR_{399}	—	September 12, 2007	Kitt Peak	Spacewatch	·	700 m	MPC; JPL
880110	2014 QT_{399}	—	September 20, 2007	Kitt Peak	Spacewatch	·	520 m	MPC; JPL
880111	2014 QD_{404}	—	August 28, 2014	Haleakala	Pan-STARRS 1	critical	1.4 km	MPC; JPL
880112	2014 QJ_{409}	—	March 5, 2013	Haleakala	Pan-STARRS 1	H	360 m	MPC; JPL
880113	2014 QV_{419}	—	July 29, 2014	Haleakala	Pan-STARRS 1	·	580 m	MPC; JPL
880114	2014 QD_{422}	—	July 28, 2014	Haleakala	Pan-STARRS 1	KOR	970 m	MPC; JPL
880115	2014 QH_{433}	—	August 24, 2014	WISE	WISE	T_{j} (2.84)	1.8 km	MPC; JPL
880116	2014 QJ_{433}	—	August 25, 2014	Haleakala	Pan-STARRS 1	APO	600 m	MPC; JPL
880117	2014 QB_{434}	—	September 18, 2003	Kitt Peak	Spacewatch	T_{j} (2.92)	2.2 km	MPC; JPL
880118	2014 QT_{434}	—	August 28, 2014	Cala d'Hort	I. de la Cueva, J. L. Ferrer	·	720 m	MPC; JPL
880119	2014 QE_{443}	—	August 18, 2014	Haleakala	Pan-STARRS 1	H	350 m	MPC; JPL
880120	2014 QQ_{443}	—	August 22, 2014	Haleakala	Pan-STARRS 1	H	370 m	MPC; JPL
880121	2014 QZ_{443}	—	October 24, 2003	Kitt Peak	Spacewatch	H	380 m	MPC; JPL
880122	2014 QV_{445}	—	August 23, 2014	Haleakala	Pan-STARRS 1	·	2.0 km	MPC; JPL
880123	2014 QC_{453}	—	August 19, 2014	Haleakala	Pan-STARRS 1	·	1.2 km	MPC; JPL
880124	2014 QS_{454}	—	August 31, 2014	Haleakala	Pan-STARRS 1	·	1.6 km	MPC; JPL
880125	2014 QF_{463}	—	August 22, 2014	Haleakala	Pan-STARRS 1	·	1.5 km	MPC; JPL
880126	2014 QG_{467}	—	August 25, 2014	Haleakala	Pan-STARRS 1	EUN	1.0 km	MPC; JPL
880127	2014 QH_{468}	—	April 19, 2012	Mount Lemmon	Mount Lemmon Survey	·	1.5 km	MPC; JPL
880128	2014 QJ_{473}	—	August 31, 2014	Haleakala	Pan-STARRS 1	·	1.7 km	MPC; JPL
880129	2014 QO_{475}	—	June 29, 2014	Haleakala	Pan-STARRS 1	·	490 m	MPC; JPL
880130	2014 QU_{484}	—	January 21, 2012	Catalina	CSS	·	570 m	MPC; JPL
880131	2014 QM_{486}	—	June 3, 2008	Kitt Peak	Spacewatch	·	1.7 km	MPC; JPL
880132	2014 QL_{498}	—	August 30, 2014	Mount Lemmon	Mount Lemmon Survey	·	1.8 km	MPC; JPL
880133	2014 QF_{501}	—	October 4, 2007	Catalina	CSS	·	560 m	MPC; JPL
880134	2014 QN_{501}	—	August 29, 2014	Haleakala	Pan-STARRS 1	·	1.7 km	MPC; JPL
880135	2014 QZ_{507}	—	April 16, 2013	Cerro Tololo-DECam	DECam	·	980 m	MPC; JPL
880136	2014 QM_{509}	—	August 23, 2014	Haleakala	Pan-STARRS 1	·	1.8 km	MPC; JPL
880137	2014 QG_{510}	—	August 27, 2014	Haleakala	Pan-STARRS 1	MAR	690 m	MPC; JPL
880138	2014 QM_{511}	—	August 29, 2014	Mount Lemmon	Mount Lemmon Survey	EOS	1.5 km	MPC; JPL
880139	2014 QQ_{511}	—	August 27, 2014	Haleakala	Pan-STARRS 1	·	1.3 km	MPC; JPL
880140	2014 QZ_{513}	—	August 25, 2014	Haleakala	Pan-STARRS 1	·	620 m	MPC; JPL
880141	2014 QB_{517}	—	August 28, 2014	Haleakala	Pan-STARRS 1	·	1.3 km	MPC; JPL
880142	2014 QP_{519}	—	August 20, 2014	Haleakala	Pan-STARRS 1	·	1.1 km	MPC; JPL
880143	2014 QT_{519}	—	August 31, 2014	Haleakala	Pan-STARRS 1	·	1.6 km	MPC; JPL
880144	2014 QX_{525}	—	August 27, 2014	Haleakala	Pan-STARRS 1	·	1.4 km	MPC; JPL
880145	2014 QP_{530}	—	August 23, 2014	Haleakala	Pan-STARRS 1	·	1.2 km	MPC; JPL
880146	2014 QZ_{534}	—	August 20, 2014	Haleakala	Pan-STARRS 1	KOR	950 m	MPC; JPL
880147	2014 QA_{544}	—	August 31, 2014	Haleakala	Pan-STARRS 1	·	540 m	MPC; JPL
880148	2014 QT_{545}	—	August 22, 2014	Haleakala	Pan-STARRS 1	·	600 m	MPC; JPL
880149	2014 QZ_{550}	—	August 22, 2014	Haleakala	Pan-STARRS 1	TEL	980 m	MPC; JPL
880150	2014 QF_{553}	—	August 27, 2014	Haleakala	Pan-STARRS 1	·	2.0 km	MPC; JPL
880151	2014 QX_{554}	—	August 23, 2014	Haleakala	Pan-STARRS 1	EOS	1.2 km	MPC; JPL
880152	2014 QG_{569}	—	August 20, 2014	Haleakala	Pan-STARRS 1	·	650 m	MPC; JPL
880153	2014 QL_{579}	—	August 20, 2014	Haleakala	Pan-STARRS 1	·	800 m	MPC; JPL
880154	2014 QE_{593}	—	August 28, 2014	Haleakala	Pan-STARRS 1	·	1.1 km	MPC; JPL
880155	2014 QU_{615}	—	August 30, 2014	Mount Lemmon	Mount Lemmon Survey	·	1.2 km	MPC; JPL
880156	2014 RG_{4}	—	July 8, 2014	Haleakala	Pan-STARRS 1	·	1.4 km	MPC; JPL
880157	2014 RF_{6}	—	July 31, 2014	Haleakala	Pan-STARRS 1	·	1.7 km	MPC; JPL
880158	2014 RR_{10}	—	October 18, 2003	Sacramento Peak	SDSS	critical	1.4 km	MPC; JPL
880159	2014 RM_{20}	—	June 23, 2014	Mount Lemmon	Mount Lemmon Survey	TIR · critical	2.0 km	MPC; JPL
880160	2014 RU_{28}	—	September 22, 2009	Kitt Peak	Spacewatch	·	1.3 km	MPC; JPL
880161	2014 RE_{32}	—	July 25, 2014	Haleakala	Pan-STARRS 1	·	560 m	MPC; JPL
880162	2014 RQ_{44}	—	August 18, 2009	Kitt Peak	Spacewatch	·	1.2 km	MPC; JPL
880163	2014 RT_{46}	—	August 25, 2014	Haleakala	Pan-STARRS 1	·	1.4 km	MPC; JPL
880164	2014 RW_{46}	—	September 6, 2014	Oukaïmeden	C. Rinner	·	1.8 km	MPC; JPL
880165	2014 RS_{57}	—	September 2, 2014	Kitt Peak	Spacewatch	·	1.6 km	MPC; JPL
880166	2014 RO_{59}	—	August 27, 2014	Haleakala	Pan-STARRS 1	THM	1.4 km	MPC; JPL
880167	2014 RS_{59}	—	August 27, 2014	Haleakala	Pan-STARRS 1	·	1.5 km	MPC; JPL
880168	2014 RA_{64}	—	September 4, 2014	Haleakala	Pan-STARRS 1	L5	6.1 km	MPC; JPL
880169	2014 RX_{67}	—	August 29, 2009	Kitt Peak	Spacewatch	·	1.4 km	MPC; JPL
880170	2014 RR_{73}	—	August 30, 2014	Kitt Peak	Spacewatch	·	1.5 km	MPC; JPL
880171	2014 RC_{77}	—	July 30, 2014	Kitt Peak	Spacewatch	·	1.2 km	MPC; JPL
880172	2014 RP_{77}	—	September 2, 2014	Haleakala	Pan-STARRS 1	·	970 m	MPC; JPL
880173	2014 RY_{81}	—	September 6, 2014	Catalina	CSS	·	1.8 km	MPC; JPL
880174	2014 RL_{84}	—	September 2, 2014	Haleakala	Pan-STARRS 1	·	700 m	MPC; JPL
880175	2014 RS_{88}	—	September 2, 2014	Haleakala	Pan-STARRS 1	·	2.4 km	MPC; JPL
880176	2014 RB_{89}	—	September 2, 2014	Haleakala	Pan-STARRS 1	LIX	2.0 km	MPC; JPL
880177	2014 RS_{89}	—	September 14, 2014	Kitt Peak	Spacewatch	·	1.7 km	MPC; JPL
880178	2014 RG_{92}	—	September 1, 2014	Mount Lemmon	Mount Lemmon Survey	EOS	1.2 km	MPC; JPL
880179	2014 SD_{3}	—	August 3, 2014	Haleakala	Pan-STARRS 1	EOS	1.2 km	MPC; JPL
880180	2014 SZ_{4}	—	August 25, 2014	Haleakala	Pan-STARRS 1	·	1.8 km	MPC; JPL
880181	2014 SG_{9}	—	August 22, 2014	Haleakala	Pan-STARRS 1	·	1.4 km	MPC; JPL
880182	2014 SN_{9}	—	September 17, 2014	Haleakala	Pan-STARRS 1	EUN	700 m	MPC; JPL
880183	2014 SF_{18}	—	November 1, 2010	Mount Lemmon	Mount Lemmon Survey	·	1.0 km	MPC; JPL
880184	2014 SF_{28}	—	September 17, 2014	Haleakala	Pan-STARRS 1	·	1.5 km	MPC; JPL
880185	2014 SG_{28}	—	August 31, 2014	Mount Lemmon	Mount Lemmon Survey	KOR	910 m	MPC; JPL
880186	2014 SX_{42}	—	July 31, 2014	Haleakala	Pan-STARRS 1	·	1.8 km	MPC; JPL
880187	2014 SW_{50}	—	September 19, 1998	Sacramento Peak	SDSS	THM	1.5 km	MPC; JPL
880188	2014 SZ_{66}	—	July 30, 2014	Haleakala	Pan-STARRS 1	·	1.5 km	MPC; JPL
880189	2014 SP_{67}	—	November 26, 2011	Haleakala	Pan-STARRS 1	(2076)	640 m	MPC; JPL
880190	2014 SH_{69}	—	August 28, 2014	Haleakala	Pan-STARRS 1	·	710 m	MPC; JPL
880191	2014 SM_{71}	—	July 7, 2014	Haleakala	Pan-STARRS 1	·	1.1 km	MPC; JPL
880192	2014 SD_{75}	—	September 27, 2009	Mount Lemmon	Mount Lemmon Survey	·	1.5 km	MPC; JPL
880193 Sopoćko	2014 SL_{99}	Sopoćko	February 21, 2012	Mount Graham	K. Černis, R. P. Boyle	·	1.4 km	MPC; JPL
880194	2014 SL_{103}	—	September 18, 2014	Haleakala	Pan-STARRS 1	·	800 m	MPC; JPL
880195	2014 SP_{103}	—	September 18, 2014	Haleakala	Pan-STARRS 1	THM	1.4 km	MPC; JPL
880196	2014 SN_{111}	—	September 18, 2014	Haleakala	Pan-STARRS 1	THM	1.1 km	MPC; JPL
880197	2014 SB_{113}	—	September 18, 2014	Haleakala	Pan-STARRS 1	critical	800 m	MPC; JPL
880198	2014 SO_{114}	—	October 26, 2009	Mount Lemmon	Mount Lemmon Survey	·	1.8 km	MPC; JPL
880199	2014 SP_{115}	—	November 19, 2007	Kitt Peak	Spacewatch	MAS	450 m	MPC; JPL
880200	2014 SJ_{121}	—	June 7, 2013	Haleakala	Pan-STARRS 1	·	1.5 km	MPC; JPL

== 880201–880300 ==
back to top

Designation			Discovery			Properties		Ref
Permanent	Provisional	Named after	Date	Site	Discoverer(s)	Category	Diam.	Ref
880201	2014 SW_{121}	—	September 18, 2014	Haleakala	Pan-STARRS 1	·	1.1 km	MPC; JPL
880202	2014 SV_{128}	—	September 2, 2014	Kitt Peak	Spacewatch	·	1.1 km	MPC; JPL
880203	2014 SQ_{130}	—	November 9, 2009	Mount Lemmon	Mount Lemmon Survey	·	1.6 km	MPC; JPL
880204	2014 SH_{139}	—	August 28, 2003	Palomar	NEAT	·	1.5 km	MPC; JPL
880205	2014 SH_{143}	—	September 19, 2014	Haleakala	Pan-STARRS 1	·	310 m	MPC; JPL
880206	2014 SF_{146}	—	September 18, 2014	Haleakala	Pan-STARRS 1	·	660 m	MPC; JPL
880207	2014 SS_{146}	—	August 27, 2014	Haleakala	Pan-STARRS 1	KOR	1.0 km	MPC; JPL
880208	2014 SP_{150}	—	December 24, 2011	Catalina	CSS	·	650 m	MPC; JPL
880209	2014 SV_{151}	—	November 16, 2006	Mount Lemmon	Mount Lemmon Survey	KON	1.4 km	MPC; JPL
880210	2014 SB_{153}	—	September 19, 2014	Haleakala	Pan-STARRS 1	·	760 m	MPC; JPL
880211	2014 SH_{156}	—	October 16, 2007	Mount Lemmon	Mount Lemmon Survey	·	810 m	MPC; JPL
880212	2014 SQ_{157}	—	September 19, 2014	Haleakala	Pan-STARRS 1	·	2.6 km	MPC; JPL
880213	2014 SZ_{157}	—	September 19, 2014	Haleakala	Pan-STARRS 1	·	1.4 km	MPC; JPL
880214	2014 SF_{159}	—	September 19, 2014	Haleakala	Pan-STARRS 1	LEO	1.1 km	MPC; JPL
880215	2014 SX_{160}	—	October 7, 2004	Kitt Peak	Spacewatch	·	540 m	MPC; JPL
880216	2014 SQ_{161}	—	September 26, 2009	Kitt Peak	Spacewatch	·	1.3 km	MPC; JPL
880217	2014 SV_{161}	—	September 19, 2014	Haleakala	Pan-STARRS 1	·	2.1 km	MPC; JPL
880218	2014 SM_{165}	—	August 27, 2014	Haleakala	Pan-STARRS 1	critical	2.1 km	MPC; JPL
880219	2014 SK_{167}	—	August 22, 2014	Haleakala	Pan-STARRS 1	KOR	1 km	MPC; JPL
880220	2014 SE_{169}	—	September 2, 2014	Catalina	CSS	·	1.3 km	MPC; JPL
880221	2014 SA_{171}	—	August 28, 2014	Haleakala	Pan-STARRS 1	·	1.3 km	MPC; JPL
880222	2014 SU_{180}	—	September 20, 2014	Haleakala	Pan-STARRS 1	·	1.7 km	MPC; JPL
880223	2014 SZ_{182}	—	September 20, 2014	Haleakala	Pan-STARRS 1	EOS	1.3 km	MPC; JPL
880224	2014 SX_{186}	—	July 31, 2014	Haleakala	Pan-STARRS 1	·	680 m	MPC; JPL
880225	2014 SJ_{189}	—	July 27, 2014	Haleakala	Pan-STARRS 1	T_{j} (2.99) · 3:2 · SHU	4.2 km	MPC; JPL
880226	2014 SX_{207}	—	November 20, 2003	Sacramento Peak	SDSS	·	1.2 km	MPC; JPL
880227	2014 SQ_{212}	—	September 20, 2014	Haleakala	Pan-STARRS 1	·	1.8 km	MPC; JPL
880228	2014 SS_{212}	—	September 20, 2014	Haleakala	Pan-STARRS 1	·	1.5 km	MPC; JPL
880229	2014 SD_{213}	—	September 20, 2014	Haleakala	Pan-STARRS 1	·	1.5 km	MPC; JPL
880230	2014 SQ_{223}	—	October 18, 2003	Anderson Mesa	LONEOS	T_{j} (2.95)	3.9 km	MPC; JPL
880231	2014 ST_{228}	—	October 25, 2009	Kitt Peak	Spacewatch	·	1.2 km	MPC; JPL
880232	2014 SB_{229}	—	September 14, 2014	Mount Lemmon	Mount Lemmon Survey	NYS	570 m	MPC; JPL
880233	2014 SJ_{230}	—	September 19, 2014	Haleakala	Pan-STARRS 1	·	1.3 km	MPC; JPL
880234	2014 SC_{233}	—	August 18, 2014	Haleakala	Pan-STARRS 1	·	1.8 km	MPC; JPL
880235	2014 SK_{249}	—	August 20, 2014	Haleakala	Pan-STARRS 1	·	760 m	MPC; JPL
880236	2014 SA_{252}	—	September 23, 2014	Mount Lemmon	Mount Lemmon Survey	·	1.4 km	MPC; JPL
880237	2014 SD_{254}	—	August 31, 2014	Kitt Peak	Spacewatch	·	750 m	MPC; JPL
880238	2014 SL_{254}	—	January 18, 2012	Mount Lemmon	Mount Lemmon Survey	·	440 m	MPC; JPL
880239	2014 SN_{254}	—	September 13, 2014	Haleakala	Pan-STARRS 1	BAR	840 m	MPC; JPL
880240	2014 SF_{272}	—	August 27, 2014	Haleakala	Pan-STARRS 1	·	1.5 km	MPC; JPL
880241	2014 SC_{282}	—	August 30, 2014	Haleakala	Pan-STARRS 1	·	730 m	MPC; JPL
880242	2014 SZ_{282}	—	September 2, 2014	Haleakala	Pan-STARRS 1	·	1.9 km	MPC; JPL
880243	2014 SH_{284}	—	August 21, 2004	Catalina	CSS	·	450 m	MPC; JPL
880244	2014 SE_{287}	—	October 12, 2007	Mount Lemmon	Mount Lemmon Survey	V	450 m	MPC; JPL
880245	2014 SU_{289}	—	February 8, 2011	Mount Lemmon	Mount Lemmon Survey	·	1.4 km	MPC; JPL
880246	2014 SS_{292}	—	September 1, 2005	Palomar	NEAT	·	1.1 km	MPC; JPL
880247	2014 SA_{294}	—	September 20, 2014	Mount Lemmon	Mount Lemmon Survey	·	2.0 km	MPC; JPL
880248	2014 SL_{300}	—	September 25, 2014	Kitt Peak	Spacewatch	EOS	1.4 km	MPC; JPL
880249	2014 SX_{300}	—	January 1, 2008	Mount Lemmon	Mount Lemmon Survey	·	890 m	MPC; JPL
880250	2014 SY_{300}	—	October 22, 2003	Kitt Peak	Spacewatch	·	920 m	MPC; JPL
880251	2014 SJ_{302}	—	June 30, 2014	Haleakala	Pan-STARRS 1	·	660 m	MPC; JPL
880252	2014 SV_{307}	—	September 24, 2014	Mount Lemmon	Mount Lemmon Survey	·	560 m	MPC; JPL
880253	2014 SH_{309}	—	May 1, 2013	Mount Lemmon	Mount Lemmon Survey	·	1.8 km	MPC; JPL
880254	2014 SS_{309}	—	September 24, 2014	Mount Lemmon	Mount Lemmon Survey	TIR	1.9 km	MPC; JPL
880255	2014 SJ_{325}	—	August 27, 2014	Haleakala	Pan-STARRS 1	·	850 m	MPC; JPL
880256	2014 SD_{328}	—	September 2, 2014	Haleakala	Pan-STARRS 1	T_{j} (2.99)	1.8 km	MPC; JPL
880257	2014 SV_{329}	—	September 14, 2014	Haleakala	Pan-STARRS 1	·	580 m	MPC; JPL
880258	2014 SB_{333}	—	September 10, 2007	Mount Lemmon	Mount Lemmon Survey	NYS	760 m	MPC; JPL
880259	2014 SC_{336}	—	September 30, 2014	Kitt Peak	Spacewatch	·	1.2 km	MPC; JPL
880260	2014 SK_{336}	—	August 25, 2014	Haleakala	Pan-STARRS 1	critical	1.5 km	MPC; JPL
880261	2014 SH_{341}	—	September 29, 2014	Haleakala	Pan-STARRS 1	H	330 m	MPC; JPL
880262	2014 SL_{344}	—	September 29, 2014	Haleakala	Pan-STARRS 1	THM	1.5 km	MPC; JPL
880263	2014 SC_{352}	—	October 24, 2009	Kitt Peak	Spacewatch	·	1.4 km	MPC; JPL
880264	2014 SN_{357}	—	September 18, 2014	Haleakala	Pan-STARRS 1	·	1.1 km	MPC; JPL
880265	2014 SR_{358}	—	September 19, 2014	Haleakala	Pan-STARRS 1	·	1.1 km	MPC; JPL
880266	2014 SK_{360}	—	September 19, 2014	Haleakala	Pan-STARRS 1	EOS	1.3 km	MPC; JPL
880267	2014 SV_{366}	—	May 5, 2010	Mount Lemmon	Mount Lemmon Survey	·	610 m	MPC; JPL
880268	2014 SF_{368}	—	September 17, 2014	Haleakala	Pan-STARRS 1	·	880 m	MPC; JPL
880269	2014 SG_{369}	—	September 24, 2014	Kitt Peak	Spacewatch	·	700 m	MPC; JPL
880270	2014 SX_{369}	—	September 24, 2014	Kitt Peak	Spacewatch	PHO	600 m	MPC; JPL
880271	2014 SD_{370}	—	September 29, 2014	Haleakala	Pan-STARRS 1	·	1.2 km	MPC; JPL
880272	2014 SZ_{370}	—	September 18, 2014	Haleakala	Pan-STARRS 1	·	1.1 km	MPC; JPL
880273	2014 SP_{372}	—	September 19, 2014	Haleakala	Pan-STARRS 1	·	560 m	MPC; JPL
880274	2014 ST_{372}	—	September 19, 1998	Sacramento Peak	SDSS	EOS	1.1 km	MPC; JPL
880275	2014 SE_{374}	—	September 23, 2014	Mount Lemmon	Mount Lemmon Survey	·	1.9 km	MPC; JPL
880276	2014 SH_{377}	—	September 25, 2014	Mount Lemmon	Mount Lemmon Survey	·	1.2 km	MPC; JPL
880277	2014 SJ_{377}	—	September 20, 2014	Haleakala	Pan-STARRS 1	·	1.2 km	MPC; JPL
880278	2014 SM_{378}	—	February 8, 2011	Mount Lemmon	Mount Lemmon Survey	·	970 m	MPC; JPL
880279	2014 SY_{378}	—	February 25, 2007	Mount Lemmon	Mount Lemmon Survey	·	880 m	MPC; JPL
880280	2014 SD_{379}	—	September 19, 2014	Haleakala	Pan-STARRS 1	·	1.5 km	MPC; JPL
880281	2014 SE_{379}	—	September 20, 2014	Haleakala	Pan-STARRS 1	·	1.5 km	MPC; JPL
880282	2014 SD_{383}	—	September 22, 2014	Haleakala	Pan-STARRS 1	KOR	1.1 km	MPC; JPL
880283	2014 SS_{383}	—	September 26, 2014	Mount Lemmon	Mount Lemmon Survey	EOS	1.1 km	MPC; JPL
880284	2014 SO_{385}	—	September 20, 2014	Haleakala	Pan-STARRS 1	·	1.3 km	MPC; JPL
880285	2014 SC_{394}	—	September 25, 2014	Kitt Peak	Spacewatch	·	1.4 km	MPC; JPL
880286	2014 SQ_{407}	—	September 19, 2014	Haleakala	Pan-STARRS 1	LIX	2.4 km	MPC; JPL
880287	2014 SE_{418}	—	September 17, 2014	Haleakala	Pan-STARRS 1	·	1.5 km	MPC; JPL
880288	2014 SZ_{434}	—	September 17, 2014	Haleakala	Pan-STARRS 1	·	1.9 km	MPC; JPL
880289	2014 SS_{438}	—	September 17, 2014	Haleakala	Pan-STARRS 1	·	1.5 km	MPC; JPL
880290	2014 TK_{1}	—	September 2, 2014	Haleakala	Pan-STARRS 1	·	1.3 km	MPC; JPL
880291	2014 TS_{1}	—	November 8, 2009	Kitt Peak	Spacewatch	·	1.2 km	MPC; JPL
880292	2014 TW_{1}	—	September 2, 2014	Haleakala	Pan-STARRS 1	MAS	490 m	MPC; JPL
880293	2014 TQ_{2}	—	September 19, 2014	Haleakala	Pan-STARRS 1	·	1.4 km	MPC; JPL
880294	2014 TC_{3}	—	September 2, 2014	Haleakala	Pan-STARRS 1	·	1.9 km	MPC; JPL
880295	2014 TL_{3}	—	September 23, 2014	Mount Lemmon	Mount Lemmon Survey	·	2.0 km	MPC; JPL
880296	2014 TN_{3}	—	November 9, 2009	Mount Lemmon	Mount Lemmon Survey	·	1.2 km	MPC; JPL
880297	2014 TJ_{6}	—	April 26, 2006	Cerro Tololo	Deep Ecliptic Survey	·	1.4 km	MPC; JPL
880298	2014 TR_{7}	—	February 16, 2010	WISE	WISE	·	1.5 km	MPC; JPL
880299	2014 TM_{14}	—	September 3, 2014	Mount Lemmon	Mount Lemmon Survey	·	560 m	MPC; JPL
880300	2014 TB_{15}	—	October 1, 2014	Haleakala	Pan-STARRS 1	·	1.7 km	MPC; JPL

== 880301–880400 ==
back to top

Designation			Discovery			Properties		Ref
Permanent	Provisional	Named after	Date	Site	Discoverer(s)	Category	Diam.	Ref
880301	2014 TH_{16}	—	October 2, 2014	Kitt Peak	Spacewatch	·	570 m	MPC; JPL
880302	2014 TL_{17}	—	October 2, 2014	Haleakala	Pan-STARRS 1	APO	90 m	MPC; JPL
880303	2014 TA_{19}	—	February 5, 2011	Mount Lemmon	Mount Lemmon Survey	·	1.2 km	MPC; JPL
880304	2014 TU_{26}	—	November 8, 2009	Kitt Peak	Spacewatch	·	1.3 km	MPC; JPL
880305	2014 TX_{31}	—	October 2, 2014	Haleakala	Pan-STARRS 1	LUT	3.4 km	MPC; JPL
880306	2014 TP_{32}	—	September 11, 2014	Haleakala	Pan-STARRS 1	H	460 m	MPC; JPL
880307	2014 TU_{32}	—	January 19, 2004	Kitt Peak	Spacewatch	T_{j} (2.93)	2.7 km	MPC; JPL
880308	2014 TG_{33}	—	October 4, 2014	Mount Lemmon	Mount Lemmon Survey	H	370 m	MPC; JPL
880309	2014 TA_{34}	—	November 7, 2010	Mount Lemmon	Mount Lemmon Survey	·	1.5 km	MPC; JPL
880310	2014 TJ_{34}	—	September 25, 2011	Haleakala	Pan-STARRS 1	·	1.3 km	MPC; JPL
880311	2014 TN_{34}	—	November 21, 2009	Mount Lemmon	Mount Lemmon Survey	H	390 m	MPC; JPL
880312	2014 TT_{34}	—	October 12, 2014	Haleakala	Pan-STARRS 1	·	1.1 km	MPC; JPL
880313	2014 TY_{34}	—	February 15, 2010	Catalina	CSS	T_{j} (2.9)	2.8 km	MPC; JPL
880314	2014 TX_{35}	—	August 19, 2014	Haleakala	Pan-STARRS 1	H	430 m	MPC; JPL
880315	2014 TY_{37}	—	September 21, 2003	Kitt Peak	Spacewatch	critical	1.5 km	MPC; JPL
880316	2014 TU_{45}	—	September 2, 2014	Haleakala	Pan-STARRS 1	·	2.5 km	MPC; JPL
880317	2014 TB_{51}	—	July 6, 2003	Kitt Peak	Spacewatch	·	770 m	MPC; JPL
880318	2014 TH_{51}	—	October 14, 2014	Mount Lemmon	Mount Lemmon Survey	·	1.9 km	MPC; JPL
880319	2014 TN_{53}	—	September 4, 2003	Kitt Peak	Spacewatch	·	720 m	MPC; JPL
880320	2014 TW_{58}	—	September 2, 2014	Haleakala	Pan-STARRS 1	·	690 m	MPC; JPL
880321	2014 TG_{60}	—	October 17, 2003	Kitt Peak	Spacewatch	·	1.7 km	MPC; JPL
880322	2014 TJ_{60}	—	April 11, 2010	WISE	WISE	·	3.3 km	MPC; JPL
880323	2014 TF_{61}	—	September 25, 2014	Kitt Peak	Spacewatch	EUP	1.7 km	MPC; JPL
880324	2014 TB_{62}	—	October 13, 2014	Mount Lemmon	Mount Lemmon Survey	NEM	1.5 km	MPC; JPL
880325	2014 TP_{67}	—	September 15, 2003	Palomar	NEAT	PHO	710 m	MPC; JPL
880326	2014 TQ_{67}	—	September 24, 2014	Mount Lemmon	Mount Lemmon Survey	THM	1.9 km	MPC; JPL
880327	2014 TC_{69}	—	October 14, 2014	Kitt Peak	Spacewatch	MAS	490 m	MPC; JPL
880328	2014 TH_{70}	—	October 14, 2014	Kitt Peak	Spacewatch	·	630 m	MPC; JPL
880329	2014 TE_{83}	—	October 15, 2014	Kitt Peak	Spacewatch	·	1.1 km	MPC; JPL
880330	2014 TR_{86}	—	September 20, 2014	Catalina	CSS	H	430 m	MPC; JPL
880331	2014 TA_{88}	—	October 1, 2014	Haleakala	Pan-STARRS 1	EOS	1.2 km	MPC; JPL
880332	2014 TT_{88}	—	April 7, 2008	Mount Lemmon	Mount Lemmon Survey	·	1.6 km	MPC; JPL
880333	2014 TY_{88}	—	October 2, 2014	Haleakala	Pan-STARRS 1	THM	1.9 km	MPC; JPL
880334	2014 TR_{90}	—	October 2, 2014	Haleakala	Pan-STARRS 1	·	1.9 km	MPC; JPL
880335	2014 TL_{93}	—	October 3, 2014	Mount Lemmon	Mount Lemmon Survey	·	1.9 km	MPC; JPL
880336	2014 TE_{97}	—	October 1, 2014	Haleakala	Pan-STARRS 1	·	650 m	MPC; JPL
880337	2014 TH_{98}	—	October 14, 2014	Mount Lemmon	Mount Lemmon Survey	·	1.6 km	MPC; JPL
880338	2014 TU_{98}	—	September 7, 2008	Mount Lemmon	Mount Lemmon Survey	·	1.8 km	MPC; JPL
880339	2014 TB_{99}	—	October 4, 2014	Haleakala	Pan-STARRS 1	TIR	1.9 km	MPC; JPL
880340	2014 TX_{100}	—	October 2, 2014	Haleakala	Pan-STARRS 1	THB	1.7 km	MPC; JPL
880341	2014 TY_{100}	—	October 2, 2014	Mount Lemmon	Mount Lemmon Survey	T_{j} (2.96)	1.9 km	MPC; JPL
880342	2014 TK_{102}	—	October 3, 2014	Mount Lemmon	Mount Lemmon Survey	·	1.6 km	MPC; JPL
880343	2014 TU_{102}	—	October 1, 2014	Haleakala	Pan-STARRS 1	·	1.4 km	MPC; JPL
880344	2014 TJ_{103}	—	October 1, 2014	Haleakala	Pan-STARRS 1	·	1.6 km	MPC; JPL
880345	2014 TH_{104}	—	October 1, 2014	Haleakala	Pan-STARRS 1	·	1.1 km	MPC; JPL
880346	2014 TO_{104}	—	October 3, 2014	Mount Lemmon	Mount Lemmon Survey	EOS	1.1 km	MPC; JPL
880347	2014 TZ_{105}	—	October 3, 2014	Mount Lemmon	Mount Lemmon Survey	·	1.2 km	MPC; JPL
880348	2014 TK_{106}	—	October 5, 2014	Mount Lemmon	Mount Lemmon Survey	T_{j} (2.94)	2.9 km	MPC; JPL
880349	2014 TX_{107}	—	October 2, 2014	Haleakala	Pan-STARRS 1	THM	1.4 km	MPC; JPL
880350	2014 TK_{110}	—	October 15, 2014	Kitt Peak	Spacewatch	·	550 m	MPC; JPL
880351	2014 TQ_{110}	—	October 1, 2014	Haleakala	Pan-STARRS 1	VER	1.9 km	MPC; JPL
880352	2014 TE_{111}	—	October 3, 2014	Mount Lemmon	Mount Lemmon Survey	H	430 m	MPC; JPL
880353	2014 TF_{113}	—	October 2, 2014	Haleakala	Pan-STARRS 1	·	2.0 km	MPC; JPL
880354	2014 TX_{114}	—	October 1, 2014	Haleakala	Pan-STARRS 1	·	620 m	MPC; JPL
880355	2014 TX_{119}	—	October 14, 2014	Mount Lemmon	Mount Lemmon Survey	·	1.4 km	MPC; JPL
880356	2014 TN_{128}	—	October 4, 2014	Mount Lemmon	Mount Lemmon Survey	·	2.1 km	MPC; JPL
880357	2014 UM	—	October 24, 2003	Kitt Peak	Spacewatch	·	750 m	MPC; JPL
880358	2014 UU_{5}	—	October 27, 2003	Anderson Mesa	LONEOS	·	2.0 km	MPC; JPL
880359	2014 UB_{6}	—	November 23, 1998	Kitt Peak	Spacewatch	·	2.0 km	MPC; JPL
880360	2014 UK_{8}	—	September 27, 2006	Mount Lemmon	Mount Lemmon Survey	·	530 m	MPC; JPL
880361	2014 UV_{8}	—	November 24, 2009	Mount Lemmon	Mount Lemmon Survey	·	1.1 km	MPC; JPL
880362	2014 UR_{9}	—	October 16, 2003	Kitt Peak	Spacewatch	·	750 m	MPC; JPL
880363	2014 UE_{12}	—	September 29, 2003	Kitt Peak	Spacewatch	EUP	2.1 km	MPC; JPL
880364	2014 UY_{12}	—	May 6, 2010	WISE	WISE	·	2.8 km	MPC; JPL
880365	2014 UC_{18}	—	September 30, 2014	Mount Lemmon	Mount Lemmon Survey	·	1.4 km	MPC; JPL
880366	2014 UK_{18}	—	January 27, 2000	Kitt Peak	Spacewatch	·	2.5 km	MPC; JPL
880367	2014 UD_{19}	—	October 18, 2014	Kitt Peak	Spacewatch	critical	1.3 km	MPC; JPL
880368	2014 UW_{21}	—	September 4, 2014	Haleakala	Pan-STARRS 1	·	1.9 km	MPC; JPL
880369	2014 US_{30}	—	October 5, 2014	Mount Lemmon	Mount Lemmon Survey	·	830 m	MPC; JPL
880370	2014 UP_{33}	—	September 2, 2014	Haleakala	Pan-STARRS 1	T_{j} (2.94)	1.1 km	MPC; JPL
880371	2014 UL_{35}	—	October 19, 2003	Kitt Peak	Spacewatch	·	720 m	MPC; JPL
880372	2014 UT_{39}	—	November 21, 2009	Mount Lemmon	Mount Lemmon Survey	·	1.8 km	MPC; JPL
880373	2014 UC_{41}	—	September 25, 2014	Mount Lemmon	Mount Lemmon Survey	T_{j} (2.99)	2.3 km	MPC; JPL
880374	2014 UL_{43}	—	November 19, 2007	Mount Lemmon	Mount Lemmon Survey	·	640 m	MPC; JPL
880375	2014 UP_{44}	—	October 17, 2014	Kitt Peak	Spacewatch	·	630 m	MPC; JPL
880376	2014 UT_{46}	—	August 31, 2014	Haleakala	Pan-STARRS 1	critical	2.5 km	MPC; JPL
880377	2014 UW_{46}	—	October 21, 2014	Kitt Peak	Spacewatch	NYS	700 m	MPC; JPL
880378	2014 UD_{53}	—	September 20, 2014	Haleakala	Pan-STARRS 1	·	730 m	MPC; JPL
880379	2014 UG_{55}	—	September 2, 2014	Haleakala	Pan-STARRS 1	·	680 m	MPC; JPL
880380	2014 UM_{55}	—	September 1, 2010	Mount Lemmon	Mount Lemmon Survey	·	690 m	MPC; JPL
880381	2014 UB_{56}	—	September 20, 2014	Haleakala	Pan-STARRS 1	EOS	1.2 km	MPC; JPL
880382	2014 UU_{62}	—	September 5, 2007	Mount Lemmon	Mount Lemmon Survey	·	610 m	MPC; JPL
880383	2014 UK_{64}	—	September 24, 2014	Kitt Peak	Spacewatch	·	820 m	MPC; JPL
880384	2014 UM_{64}	—	September 21, 2009	Kitt Peak	Spacewatch	·	1.3 km	MPC; JPL
880385	2014 UV_{68}	—	October 13, 2014	Mount Lemmon	Mount Lemmon Survey	·	1.7 km	MPC; JPL
880386	2014 UL_{69}	—	October 21, 2014	Mount Lemmon	Mount Lemmon Survey	·	1.8 km	MPC; JPL
880387	2014 UP_{69}	—	October 18, 2009	Kitt Peak	Spacewatch	·	1.3 km	MPC; JPL
880388	2014 UD_{77}	—	October 21, 2014	Mount Lemmon	Mount Lemmon Survey	·	2.2 km	MPC; JPL
880389	2014 UN_{83}	—	October 21, 2014	Mount Lemmon	Mount Lemmon Survey	·	1.6 km	MPC; JPL
880390	2014 UD_{98}	—	September 30, 2003	Sacramento Peak	SDSS	·	800 m	MPC; JPL
880391	2014 UF_{98}	—	November 21, 2009	Kitt Peak	Spacewatch	·	1.5 km	MPC; JPL
880392	2014 UT_{99}	—	September 23, 2014	Mount Lemmon	Mount Lemmon Survey	H	380 m	MPC; JPL
880393	2014 UO_{103}	—	October 24, 2014	Kitt Peak	Spacewatch	·	1.7 km	MPC; JPL
880394	2014 UL_{104}	—	October 7, 2007	Mount Lemmon	Mount Lemmon Survey	·	680 m	MPC; JPL
880395	2014 UX_{108}	—	September 18, 2003	Kitt Peak	Spacewatch	NYS	660 m	MPC; JPL
880396	2014 UY_{108}	—	September 4, 2014	Haleakala	Pan-STARRS 1	·	1.7 km	MPC; JPL
880397	2014 UY_{115}	—	October 27, 2014	Haleakala	Pan-STARRS 1	H	360 m	MPC; JPL
880398	2014 UG_{117}	—	October 28, 2014	Haleakala	Pan-STARRS 1	H	470 m	MPC; JPL
880399	2014 UY_{121}	—	October 12, 2014	Mount Lemmon	Mount Lemmon Survey	·	790 m	MPC; JPL
880400	2014 UH_{124}	—	October 3, 2014	Mount Lemmon	Mount Lemmon Survey	·	1.9 km	MPC; JPL

== 880401–880500 ==
back to top

Designation			Discovery			Properties		Ref
Permanent	Provisional	Named after	Date	Site	Discoverer(s)	Category	Diam.	Ref
880401	2014 UM_{130}	—	September 25, 2014	Kitt Peak	Spacewatch	·	1.9 km	MPC; JPL
880402	2014 UX_{130}	—	October 23, 2014	Mount Lemmon	Mount Lemmon Survey	·	2.0 km	MPC; JPL
880403	2014 UO_{136}	—	October 10, 2008	Kitt Peak	Spacewatch	·	1.8 km	MPC; JPL
880404	2014 UH_{144}	—	August 29, 2014	Mount Lemmon	Mount Lemmon Survey	·	720 m	MPC; JPL
880405	2014 UV_{144}	—	September 1, 2014	Mount Lemmon	Mount Lemmon Survey	·	710 m	MPC; JPL
880406	2014 UR_{148}	—	October 25, 2014	Kitt Peak	Spacewatch	·	1.4 km	MPC; JPL
880407	2014 UT_{152}	—	October 2, 2014	Haleakala	Pan-STARRS 1	·	1.1 km	MPC; JPL
880408	2014 UH_{153}	—	October 24, 2009	Mount Lemmon	Mount Lemmon Survey	·	1.3 km	MPC; JPL
880409	2014 UP_{153}	—	September 2, 2014	Haleakala	Pan-STARRS 1	·	1.8 km	MPC; JPL
880410	2014 UA_{165}	—	October 2, 2014	Kitt Peak	Spacewatch	·	2.1 km	MPC; JPL
880411	2014 UZ_{165}	—	October 26, 2014	Mount Lemmon	Mount Lemmon Survey	·	950 m	MPC; JPL
880412	2014 UT_{166}	—	October 26, 2014	Mount Lemmon	Mount Lemmon Survey	·	630 m	MPC; JPL
880413	2014 UA_{170}	—	October 26, 2014	Haleakala	Pan-STARRS 1	·	1.9 km	MPC; JPL
880414	2014 US_{174}	—	October 28, 2014	Haleakala	Pan-STARRS 1	·	1.9 km	MPC; JPL
880415	2014 UB_{177}	—	October 1, 2014	Haleakala	Pan-STARRS 1	H	310 m	MPC; JPL
880416	2014 UH_{181}	—	July 30, 2005	Palomar	NEAT	·	920 m	MPC; JPL
880417	2014 UP_{182}	—	December 20, 2009	Mount Lemmon	Mount Lemmon Survey	·	2.4 km	MPC; JPL
880418	2014 UL_{185}	—	October 28, 2014	Mount Lemmon	Mount Lemmon Survey	·	2.0 km	MPC; JPL
880419	2014 UV_{185}	—	October 3, 2014	Mount Lemmon	Mount Lemmon Survey	·	2.0 km	MPC; JPL
880420	2014 UP_{209}	—	October 26, 2014	Calar Alto	S. Mottola, S. Hellmich	critical	1.6 km	MPC; JPL
880421	2014 UJ_{218}	—	January 10, 2010	Mount Lemmon	Mount Lemmon Survey	·	2.1 km	MPC; JPL
880422	2014 UZ_{222}	—	November 23, 2009	Mount Lemmon	Mount Lemmon Survey	·	3.7 km	MPC; JPL
880423	2014 UE_{226}	—	October 25, 2014	Haleakala	Pan-STARRS 1	H	320 m	MPC; JPL
880424	2014 UJ_{226}	—	October 18, 2014	Mount Lemmon	Mount Lemmon Survey	EOS	1.5 km	MPC; JPL
880425	2014 UQ_{226}	—	October 22, 2014	Mount Lemmon	Mount Lemmon Survey	·	1.8 km	MPC; JPL
880426	2014 UY_{226}	—	October 26, 2014	Haleakala	Pan-STARRS 1	·	1.2 km	MPC; JPL
880427	2014 UC_{227}	—	February 4, 2005	Mount Lemmon	Mount Lemmon Survey	·	1.3 km	MPC; JPL
880428	2014 UU_{238}	—	October 28, 2014	Haleakala	Pan-STARRS 1	·	1.3 km	MPC; JPL
880429	2014 UR_{239}	—	July 12, 2013	Haleakala	Pan-STARRS 1	EOS	1.3 km	MPC; JPL
880430	2014 UF_{243}	—	October 25, 2014	Mount Lemmon	Mount Lemmon Survey	EUP	2.5 km	MPC; JPL
880431	2014 UV_{243}	—	October 28, 2014	Mount Lemmon	Mount Lemmon Survey	EUP	2.7 km	MPC; JPL
880432	2014 UP_{244}	—	October 26, 2014	Mount Lemmon	Mount Lemmon Survey	·	2.2 km	MPC; JPL
880433	2014 UF_{245}	—	October 22, 2014	Catalina	CSS	·	1.3 km	MPC; JPL
880434	2014 UL_{245}	—	October 24, 2014	Kitt Peak	Spacewatch	·	1.9 km	MPC; JPL
880435	2014 UX_{245}	—	October 28, 2014	Haleakala	Pan-STARRS 1	·	2.0 km	MPC; JPL
880436	2014 UW_{246}	—	October 17, 2014	Kitt Peak	Spacewatch	·	1.7 km	MPC; JPL
880437	2014 UX_{246}	—	October 23, 2014	Mount Lemmon	Mount Lemmon Survey	·	2.6 km	MPC; JPL
880438	2014 UD_{247}	—	October 29, 2014	Haleakala	Pan-STARRS 1	·	1.5 km	MPC; JPL
880439	2014 UR_{250}	—	October 28, 2014	Haleakala	Pan-STARRS 1	·	1.6 km	MPC; JPL
880440	2014 UT_{250}	—	October 30, 2014	Mount Lemmon	Mount Lemmon Survey	·	2.3 km	MPC; JPL
880441	2014 UT_{253}	—	October 17, 2014	Mount Lemmon	Mount Lemmon Survey	·	1.5 km	MPC; JPL
880442	2014 UK_{256}	—	October 21, 2014	Mount Lemmon	Mount Lemmon Survey	L5	7.2 km	MPC; JPL
880443	2014 US_{259}	—	October 22, 2014	Mount Lemmon	Mount Lemmon Survey	EOS	1.4 km	MPC; JPL
880444	2014 UN_{260}	—	October 21, 2014	Catalina	CSS	·	910 m	MPC; JPL
880445	2014 US_{260}	—	October 29, 2014	Kitt Peak	Spacewatch	EOS	1.2 km	MPC; JPL
880446	2014 UF_{262}	—	October 31, 2014	Mount Lemmon	Mount Lemmon Survey	·	1.1 km	MPC; JPL
880447	2014 UD_{264}	—	October 26, 2014	Mount Lemmon	Mount Lemmon Survey	·	1.7 km	MPC; JPL
880448	2014 UE_{264}	—	October 28, 2014	Haleakala	Pan-STARRS 1	·	1.8 km	MPC; JPL
880449	2014 UO_{265}	—	October 29, 2014	Haleakala	Pan-STARRS 1	·	680 m	MPC; JPL
880450	2014 UD_{267}	—	October 17, 2014	Mount Lemmon	Mount Lemmon Survey	·	1.8 km	MPC; JPL
880451	2014 UN_{267}	—	October 30, 2014	Mount Lemmon	Mount Lemmon Survey	·	1.7 km	MPC; JPL
880452	2014 UO_{267}	—	October 28, 2014	Haleakala	Pan-STARRS 1	·	1.7 km	MPC; JPL
880453	2014 UP_{267}	—	October 28, 2014	Haleakala	Pan-STARRS 1	TIR	1.8 km	MPC; JPL
880454	2014 UL_{269}	—	October 28, 2014	Haleakala	Pan-STARRS 1	THM	1.4 km	MPC; JPL
880455	2014 UR_{270}	—	October 25, 2014	Mount Lemmon	Mount Lemmon Survey	L5	6.6 km	MPC; JPL
880456	2014 UW_{270}	—	October 29, 2014	Haleakala	Pan-STARRS 1	·	900 m	MPC; JPL
880457	2014 UY_{271}	—	October 29, 2014	Haleakala	Pan-STARRS 1	T_{j} (2.99) · EUP	2.2 km	MPC; JPL
880458	2014 UP_{272}	—	October 25, 2014	Kitt Peak	Spacewatch	·	650 m	MPC; JPL
880459	2014 UX_{274}	—	October 26, 2014	Mount Lemmon	Mount Lemmon Survey	·	2.0 km	MPC; JPL
880460	2014 UO_{280}	—	November 21, 2014	Haleakala	Pan-STARRS 1	·	1.3 km	MPC; JPL
880461	2014 UL_{284}	—	October 30, 2014	Mount Lemmon	Mount Lemmon Survey	H	370 m	MPC; JPL
880462	2014 UB_{308}	—	October 28, 2014	Haleakala	Pan-STARRS 1	·	2.0 km	MPC; JPL
880463	2014 VO_{2}	—	August 25, 2014	Haleakala	Pan-STARRS 1	·	1.5 km	MPC; JPL
880464	2014 VC_{4}	—	November 8, 2009	Tzec Maun	Shurpakov, S.	·	3.2 km	MPC; JPL
880465	2014 VO_{6}	—	November 25, 2009	Mount Lemmon	Mount Lemmon Survey	·	1.0 km	MPC; JPL
880466	2014 VR_{7}	—	October 20, 2014	Mount Lemmon	Mount Lemmon Survey	·	950 m	MPC; JPL
880467	2014 VW_{8}	—	September 22, 2014	Haleakala	Pan-STARRS 1	EUN	780 m	MPC; JPL
880468	2014 VA_{10}	—	February 4, 2011	Catalina	CSS	·	1.7 km	MPC; JPL
880469	2014 VF_{11}	—	March 13, 2010	WISE	WISE	·	2.3 km	MPC; JPL
880470	2014 VY_{11}	—	October 30, 2014	Kitt Peak	Spacewatch	·	1.2 km	MPC; JPL
880471	2014 VQ_{14}	—	November 12, 2014	Haleakala	Pan-STARRS 1	·	610 m	MPC; JPL
880472	2014 VJ_{15}	—	September 24, 2014	Mount Lemmon	Mount Lemmon Survey	·	1.2 km	MPC; JPL
880473	2014 VC_{17}	—	May 3, 2010	WISE	WISE	·	2.1 km	MPC; JPL
880474	2014 VW_{17}	—	November 26, 2009	Kitt Peak	Spacewatch	·	1.3 km	MPC; JPL
880475	2014 VM_{23}	—	October 28, 2005	Kitt Peak	Spacewatch	CLO	1.2 km	MPC; JPL
880476	2014 VW_{23}	—	September 22, 2014	Haleakala	Pan-STARRS 1	·	2.1 km	MPC; JPL
880477	2014 VG_{29}	—	November 14, 2014	Kitt Peak	Spacewatch	·	1.3 km	MPC; JPL
880478	2014 VP_{30}	—	October 28, 2014	Kitt Peak	Spacewatch	V	480 m	MPC; JPL
880479	2014 VS_{33}	—	October 14, 2014	Kitt Peak	Spacewatch	URS	2.0 km	MPC; JPL
880480	2014 VM_{35}	—	November 15, 2014	Mount Lemmon	Mount Lemmon Survey	·	1.9 km	MPC; JPL
880481	2014 VC_{37}	—	November 15, 2014	Mount Lemmon	Mount Lemmon Survey	THM	1.5 km	MPC; JPL
880482	2014 VE_{38}	—	November 4, 2014	Mount Lemmon	Mount Lemmon Survey	·	2.1 km	MPC; JPL
880483	2014 VD_{39}	—	November 10, 2014	Haleakala	Pan-STARRS 1	ADE	1.6 km	MPC; JPL
880484	2014 VG_{40}	—	November 3, 2014	Mount Lemmon	Mount Lemmon Survey	·	2.1 km	MPC; JPL
880485	2014 VO_{41}	—	November 1, 2014	Mount Lemmon	Mount Lemmon Survey	·	2.3 km	MPC; JPL
880486	2014 VQ_{41}	—	November 9, 2014	Haleakala	Pan-STARRS 1	·	1.6 km	MPC; JPL
880487	2014 VX_{41}	—	November 3, 2014	Mount Lemmon	Mount Lemmon Survey	·	1.5 km	MPC; JPL
880488	2014 VE_{42}	—	November 1, 2014	Mount Lemmon	Mount Lemmon Survey	·	1.8 km	MPC; JPL
880489	2014 VQ_{42}	—	November 3, 2014	Mount Lemmon	Mount Lemmon Survey	·	2.1 km	MPC; JPL
880490	2014 WQ	—	October 26, 2014	Mount Lemmon	Mount Lemmon Survey	H	440 m	MPC; JPL
880491	2014 WM_{6}	—	December 17, 2001	Kitt Peak	Deep Lens Survey	L5	10 km	MPC; JPL
880492	2014 WE_{11}	—	October 25, 2014	Haleakala	Pan-STARRS 1	·	430 m	MPC; JPL
880493	2014 WW_{11}	—	November 16, 2014	Mount Lemmon	Mount Lemmon Survey	·	1.2 km	MPC; JPL
880494	2014 WA_{14}	—	October 29, 2014	Kitt Peak	Spacewatch	·	1.8 km	MPC; JPL
880495	2014 WA_{16}	—	November 16, 2014	Mount Lemmon	Mount Lemmon Survey	L5	6.8 km	MPC; JPL
880496	2014 WW_{18}	—	August 10, 2002	Cerro Tololo	Deep Ecliptic Survey	·	1.6 km	MPC; JPL
880497	2014 WO_{20}	—	October 16, 2014	Kitt Peak	Spacewatch	NYS	720 m	MPC; JPL
880498	2014 WP_{20}	—	October 26, 2014	Mount Lemmon	Mount Lemmon Survey	·	1.7 km	MPC; JPL
880499	2014 WO_{23}	—	October 26, 2014	Mount Lemmon	Mount Lemmon Survey	·	2.1 km	MPC; JPL
880500	2014 WK_{27}	—	October 22, 2014	Mount Lemmon	Mount Lemmon Survey	·	1.6 km	MPC; JPL

== 880501–880600 ==
back to top

Designation			Discovery			Properties		Ref
Permanent	Provisional	Named after	Date	Site	Discoverer(s)	Category	Diam.	Ref
880501	2014 WR_{28}	—	November 16, 2003	Kitt Peak	Spacewatch	TIR	1.7 km	MPC; JPL
880502	2014 WZ_{28}	—	November 17, 2014	Mount Lemmon	Mount Lemmon Survey	·	2.4 km	MPC; JPL
880503	2014 WN_{30}	—	November 17, 2014	Mount Lemmon	Mount Lemmon Survey	·	1.6 km	MPC; JPL
880504	2014 WR_{31}	—	October 28, 2014	Haleakala	Pan-STARRS 1	·	710 m	MPC; JPL
880505	2014 WC_{34}	—	October 31, 2014	Kitt Peak	Spacewatch	·	1.9 km	MPC; JPL
880506	2014 WR_{34}	—	September 24, 2014	Mount Lemmon	Mount Lemmon Survey	·	770 m	MPC; JPL
880507	2014 WW_{34}	—	January 19, 2012	Haleakala	Pan-STARRS 1	·	730 m	MPC; JPL
880508	2014 WE_{36}	—	November 24, 2009	Kitt Peak	Spacewatch	EOS	1.2 km	MPC; JPL
880509	2014 WF_{36}	—	October 28, 2014	Haleakala	Pan-STARRS 1	·	1.4 km	MPC; JPL
880510	2014 WW_{40}	—	November 17, 2014	Haleakala	Pan-STARRS 1	·	1.6 km	MPC; JPL
880511	2014 WY_{41}	—	September 20, 2014	Haleakala	Pan-STARRS 1	·	1.6 km	MPC; JPL
880512	2014 WC_{42}	—	October 7, 2010	Kitt Peak	Spacewatch	V	470 m	MPC; JPL
880513	2014 WU_{45}	—	October 20, 2014	Mount Lemmon	Mount Lemmon Survey	·	1.9 km	MPC; JPL
880514	2014 WZ_{45}	—	October 20, 2008	Mount Lemmon	Mount Lemmon Survey	THM	1.6 km	MPC; JPL
880515	2014 WL_{52}	—	November 17, 2014	Haleakala	Pan-STARRS 1	·	1.5 km	MPC; JPL
880516	2014 WS_{52}	—	November 4, 2014	Mount Lemmon	Mount Lemmon Survey	·	1.4 km	MPC; JPL
880517	2014 WL_{53}	—	September 24, 2008	Kitt Peak	Spacewatch	·	1.8 km	MPC; JPL
880518	2014 WY_{53}	—	October 22, 2003	Kitt Peak	Spacewatch	·	1.7 km	MPC; JPL
880519	2014 WZ_{53}	—	November 17, 2014	Haleakala	Pan-STARRS 1	·	1.5 km	MPC; JPL
880520	2014 WF_{55}	—	February 27, 2012	Haleakala	Pan-STARRS 1	·	710 m	MPC; JPL
880521	2014 WX_{55}	—	November 11, 1996	Kitt Peak	Spacewatch	·	660 m	MPC; JPL
880522	2014 WC_{58}	—	September 20, 2014	Haleakala	Pan-STARRS 1	·	1.8 km	MPC; JPL
880523	2014 WC_{59}	—	October 23, 2014	Kitt Peak	Spacewatch	·	1.4 km	MPC; JPL
880524	2014 WD_{61}	—	October 25, 2014	Haleakala	Pan-STARRS 1	V	470 m	MPC; JPL
880525	2014 WG_{65}	—	September 28, 2008	Catalina	CSS	·	2.7 km	MPC; JPL
880526	2014 WX_{77}	—	January 8, 2010	Kitt Peak	Spacewatch	·	1.7 km	MPC; JPL
880527	2014 WU_{78}	—	September 20, 2014	Haleakala	Pan-STARRS 1	KON	1.3 km	MPC; JPL
880528	2014 WO_{85}	—	October 25, 2014	Haleakala	Pan-STARRS 1	THM	1.4 km	MPC; JPL
880529	2014 WG_{89}	—	November 17, 2014	Mount Lemmon	Mount Lemmon Survey	·	1.3 km	MPC; JPL
880530	2014 WZ_{90}	—	February 4, 2005	Kitt Peak	Spacewatch	·	1.8 km	MPC; JPL
880531	2014 WO_{95}	—	November 17, 2014	Mount Lemmon	Mount Lemmon Survey	·	1.9 km	MPC; JPL
880532	2014 WA_{97}	—	November 17, 2014	Haleakala	Pan-STARRS 1	·	1.8 km	MPC; JPL
880533	2014 WR_{99}	—	November 17, 2014	Mount Lemmon	Mount Lemmon Survey	·	1.5 km	MPC; JPL
880534	2014 WB_{103}	—	August 31, 2014	Haleakala	Pan-STARRS 1	critical	1.7 km	MPC; JPL
880535	2014 WW_{105}	—	October 4, 2014	Kitt Peak	Spacewatch	·	750 m	MPC; JPL
880536	2014 WM_{109}	—	September 6, 2014	Mount Lemmon	Mount Lemmon Survey	·	1.6 km	MPC; JPL
880537	2014 WW_{109}	—	November 18, 2014	Haleakala	Pan-STARRS 1	·	2.3 km	MPC; JPL
880538	2014 WV_{113}	—	September 3, 2014	Mayhill-ISON	L. Elenin	ADE	1.5 km	MPC; JPL
880539	2014 WV_{119}	—	November 1, 2014	Mount Lemmon	Mount Lemmon Survey	L5	7.7 km	MPC; JPL
880540	2014 WN_{121}	—	September 20, 2014	Haleakala	Pan-STARRS 1	·	1.2 km	MPC; JPL
880541	2014 WQ_{122}	—	November 1, 2014	Mount Lemmon	Mount Lemmon Survey	TIR	1.9 km	MPC; JPL
880542	2014 WQ_{123}	—	October 23, 2014	Kitt Peak	Spacewatch	·	2.1 km	MPC; JPL
880543	2014 WV_{126}	—	October 22, 2014	Mount Lemmon	Mount Lemmon Survey	·	1.6 km	MPC; JPL
880544	2014 WJ_{127}	—	October 31, 2014	Mount Lemmon	Mount Lemmon Survey	·	2.0 km	MPC; JPL
880545	2014 WQ_{142}	—	November 17, 2014	Haleakala	Pan-STARRS 1	·	2.1 km	MPC; JPL
880546	2014 WK_{161}	—	November 18, 2014	Mount Lemmon	Mount Lemmon Survey	T_{j} (2.9)	2.5 km	MPC; JPL
880547	2014 WA_{169}	—	November 19, 2014	Mount Lemmon	Mount Lemmon Survey	·	2.5 km	MPC; JPL
880548	2014 WJ_{170}	—	October 25, 2014	Haleakala	Pan-STARRS 1	·	1.1 km	MPC; JPL
880549	2014 WE_{173}	—	July 31, 2014	Haleakala	Pan-STARRS 1	·	1.1 km	MPC; JPL
880550	2014 WQ_{178}	—	October 2, 2014	Haleakala	Pan-STARRS 1	·	1.5 km	MPC; JPL
880551	2014 WH_{181}	—	October 2, 2014	Haleakala	Pan-STARRS 1	·	1.2 km	MPC; JPL
880552	2014 WJ_{183}	—	October 4, 2014	Kitt Peak	Spacewatch	critical	1.0 km	MPC; JPL
880553	2014 WV_{184}	—	November 20, 2014	Mount Lemmon	Mount Lemmon Survey	·	1.7 km	MPC; JPL
880554	2014 WK_{188}	—	November 20, 2014	Haleakala	Pan-STARRS 1	·	1.9 km	MPC; JPL
880555	2014 WW_{191}	—	November 20, 2014	Haleakala	Pan-STARRS 1	·	2.2 km	MPC; JPL
880556	2014 WR_{192}	—	November 20, 2014	Haleakala	Pan-STARRS 1	·	1.7 km	MPC; JPL
880557	2014 WN_{195}	—	February 21, 2012	Kitt Peak	Spacewatch	·	790 m	MPC; JPL
880558	2014 WU_{195}	—	November 21, 2014	Mount Lemmon	Mount Lemmon Survey	·	1.7 km	MPC; JPL
880559	2014 WB_{198}	—	November 21, 2014	Haleakala	Pan-STARRS 1	LIX	2.0 km	MPC; JPL
880560	2014 WD_{198}	—	November 21, 2014	Haleakala	Pan-STARRS 1	EOS	1.3 km	MPC; JPL
880561	2014 WY_{198}	—	November 21, 2014	Haleakala	Pan-STARRS 1	·	750 m	MPC; JPL
880562	2014 WM_{199}	—	November 21, 2014	Haleakala	Pan-STARRS 1	·	890 m	MPC; JPL
880563	2014 WV_{201}	—	November 20, 2014	Catalina	CSS	PHO	1.1 km	MPC; JPL
880564	2014 WX_{201}	—	October 30, 2014	Mount Lemmon	Mount Lemmon Survey	H	420 m	MPC; JPL
880565	2014 WX_{206}	—	January 11, 2008	Kitt Peak	Spacewatch	MAS	420 m	MPC; JPL
880566	2014 WQ_{210}	—	September 20, 2014	Haleakala	Pan-STARRS 1	·	700 m	MPC; JPL
880567	2014 WM_{212}	—	October 30, 2014	Mount Lemmon	Mount Lemmon Survey	·	1.6 km	MPC; JPL
880568	2014 WE_{217}	—	November 18, 2014	Mount Lemmon	Mount Lemmon Survey	·	1.9 km	MPC; JPL
880569	2014 WD_{223}	—	October 21, 2014	Mount Lemmon	Mount Lemmon Survey	·	1.3 km	MPC; JPL
880570	2014 WS_{227}	—	September 20, 2003	Kitt Peak	Spacewatch	·	2.9 km	MPC; JPL
880571	2014 WW_{232}	—	January 11, 2008	Kitt Peak	Spacewatch	MAS	480 m	MPC; JPL
880572	2014 WF_{234}	—	September 28, 2009	Mount Lemmon	Mount Lemmon Survey	·	1.7 km	MPC; JPL
880573	2014 WC_{235}	—	July 12, 2013	Haleakala	Pan-STARRS 1	·	2.2 km	MPC; JPL
880574	2014 WL_{237}	—	July 15, 2013	Haleakala	Pan-STARRS 1	·	1.7 km	MPC; JPL
880575	2014 WO_{238}	—	November 20, 2014	Haleakala	Pan-STARRS 1	(5)	760 m	MPC; JPL
880576	2014 WC_{240}	—	November 16, 2014	Mount Lemmon	Mount Lemmon Survey	H	410 m	MPC; JPL
880577	2014 WH_{242}	—	November 19, 2009	Catalina	CSS	·	1.8 km	MPC; JPL
880578	2014 WV_{251}	—	December 19, 2003	Socorro	LINEAR	T_{j} (2.94)	3.1 km	MPC; JPL
880579	2014 WS_{258}	—	November 21, 2014	Haleakala	Pan-STARRS 1	·	1.0 km	MPC; JPL
880580	2014 WR_{261}	—	August 24, 2008	Kitt Peak	Spacewatch	·	1.7 km	MPC; JPL
880581	2014 WS_{261}	—	November 21, 2014	Haleakala	Pan-STARRS 1	·	1.7 km	MPC; JPL
880582	2014 WC_{262}	—	November 21, 2014	Haleakala	Pan-STARRS 1	·	650 m	MPC; JPL
880583	2014 WG_{262}	—	November 21, 2014	Haleakala	Pan-STARRS 1	EOS	1.4 km	MPC; JPL
880584	2014 WT_{264}	—	October 22, 2014	Kitt Peak	Spacewatch	·	1.5 km	MPC; JPL
880585	2014 WA_{268}	—	October 28, 2008	Mount Lemmon	Mount Lemmon Survey	·	2.4 km	MPC; JPL
880586	2014 WG_{269}	—	October 30, 2014	Kitt Peak	Spacewatch	·	1.6 km	MPC; JPL
880587	2014 WZ_{269}	—	November 21, 2014	Haleakala	Pan-STARRS 1	·	1.4 km	MPC; JPL
880588	2014 WC_{272}	—	November 21, 2014	Haleakala	Pan-STARRS 1	·	1.3 km	MPC; JPL
880589	2014 WS_{273}	—	November 21, 2014	Haleakala	Pan-STARRS 1	T_{j} (2.96)	2.4 km	MPC; JPL
880590	2014 WK_{274}	—	April 12, 2010	WISE	WISE	·	1.9 km	MPC; JPL
880591	2014 WR_{274}	—	October 25, 2014	Mount Lemmon	Mount Lemmon Survey	·	1.3 km	MPC; JPL
880592	2014 WY_{274}	—	November 21, 2014	Haleakala	Pan-STARRS 1	·	2.3 km	MPC; JPL
880593	2014 WY_{283}	—	October 18, 2014	Kitt Peak	Spacewatch	·	1.8 km	MPC; JPL
880594	2014 WO_{286}	—	October 25, 2014	Mount Lemmon	Mount Lemmon Survey	EOS	1.2 km	MPC; JPL
880595	2014 WY_{286}	—	October 2, 2014	Haleakala	Pan-STARRS 1	·	1.1 km	MPC; JPL
880596	2014 WT_{289}	—	September 27, 2003	Kitt Peak	Spacewatch	·	1.7 km	MPC; JPL
880597	2014 WW_{289}	—	November 29, 2003	Kitt Peak	Spacewatch	·	2.4 km	MPC; JPL
880598	2014 WB_{293}	—	November 21, 2014	Haleakala	Pan-STARRS 1	·	1.2 km	MPC; JPL
880599	2014 WE_{299}	—	November 21, 2014	Haleakala	Pan-STARRS 1	·	2.0 km	MPC; JPL
880600	2014 WR_{300}	—	November 22, 2014	Mount Lemmon	Mount Lemmon Survey	·	1.1 km	MPC; JPL

== 880601–880700 ==
back to top

Designation			Discovery			Properties		Ref
Permanent	Provisional	Named after	Date	Site	Discoverer(s)	Category	Diam.	Ref
880601	2014 WE_{301}	—	November 22, 2014	Mount Lemmon	Mount Lemmon Survey	·	1.6 km	MPC; JPL
880602	2014 WT_{302}	—	January 17, 2010	Nazaret	G. Muler, J. M. Ruiz	·	2.3 km	MPC; JPL
880603	2014 WS_{304}	—	August 24, 2008	Kitt Peak	Spacewatch	·	2.0 km	MPC; JPL
880604	2014 WX_{312}	—	December 15, 2010	Mount Lemmon	Mount Lemmon Survey	EUN	790 m	MPC; JPL
880605	2014 WD_{315}	—	August 23, 2014	Haleakala	Pan-STARRS 1	·	890 m	MPC; JPL
880606	2014 WM_{317}	—	March 8, 2005	Mount Lemmon	Mount Lemmon Survey	·	630 m	MPC; JPL
880607	2014 WT_{320}	—	August 23, 2014	Haleakala	Pan-STARRS 1	·	1.3 km	MPC; JPL
880608	2014 WY_{321}	—	April 23, 2010	WISE	WISE	·	2.4 km	MPC; JPL
880609	2014 WZ_{326}	—	November 22, 2014	Haleakala	Pan-STARRS 1	EOS	1.2 km	MPC; JPL
880610	2014 WO_{329}	—	November 22, 2014	Haleakala	Pan-STARRS 1	·	1.9 km	MPC; JPL
880611	2014 WZ_{336}	—	September 18, 2014	Haleakala	Pan-STARRS 1	EUN	970 m	MPC; JPL
880612	2014 WB_{338}	—	November 11, 2014	Haleakala	Pan-STARRS 1	·	2.1 km	MPC; JPL
880613	2014 WD_{343}	—	October 29, 2014	Haleakala	Pan-STARRS 1	·	1.7 km	MPC; JPL
880614	2014 WU_{345}	—	October 3, 2008	Mount Lemmon	Mount Lemmon Survey	THB	1.9 km	MPC; JPL
880615	2014 WV_{346}	—	November 11, 2014	Haleakala	Pan-STARRS 1	·	1.1 km	MPC; JPL
880616	2014 WG_{347}	—	July 15, 2013	Haleakala	Pan-STARRS 1	·	1.4 km	MPC; JPL
880617	2014 WT_{349}	—	November 1, 2014	Mount Lemmon	Mount Lemmon Survey	EOS	1.2 km	MPC; JPL
880618	2014 WZ_{350}	—	November 23, 2014	Mount Lemmon	Mount Lemmon Survey	·	1.3 km	MPC; JPL
880619	2014 WA_{351}	—	November 23, 2014	Mount Lemmon	Mount Lemmon Survey	·	1.5 km	MPC; JPL
880620	2014 WL_{353}	—	November 23, 2014	Haleakala	Pan-STARRS 1	·	730 m	MPC; JPL
880621	2014 WS_{353}	—	October 26, 2014	Haleakala	Pan-STARRS 1	·	1.6 km	MPC; JPL
880622	2014 WK_{357}	—	November 24, 2014	Mount Lemmon	Mount Lemmon Survey	EOS	1.3 km	MPC; JPL
880623	2014 WF_{361}	—	November 25, 2014	Mount Lemmon	Mount Lemmon Survey	·	1.6 km	MPC; JPL
880624	2014 WR_{361}	—	November 25, 2014	Mount Lemmon	Mount Lemmon Survey	·	1.3 km	MPC; JPL
880625	2014 WF_{369}	—	November 27, 2014	Mount Lemmon	Mount Lemmon Survey	·	1.1 km	MPC; JPL
880626	2014 WL_{374}	—	November 16, 2014	Mount Lemmon	Mount Lemmon Survey	·	2.2 km	MPC; JPL
880627	2014 WL_{376}	—	November 22, 2014	Mount Lemmon	Mount Lemmon Survey	·	1.6 km	MPC; JPL
880628	2014 WR_{376}	—	November 22, 2014	Mount Lemmon	Mount Lemmon Survey	·	1.3 km	MPC; JPL
880629	2014 WW_{377}	—	November 22, 2014	Haleakala	Pan-STARRS 1	·	1.6 km	MPC; JPL
880630	2014 WA_{380}	—	November 22, 2014	Haleakala	Pan-STARRS 1	·	1.7 km	MPC; JPL
880631	2014 WE_{389}	—	December 25, 2009	Kitt Peak	Spacewatch	·	1.8 km	MPC; JPL
880632	2014 WR_{391}	—	February 26, 2010	WISE	WISE	·	1.9 km	MPC; JPL
880633	2014 WW_{393}	—	October 22, 2014	Mount Lemmon	Mount Lemmon Survey	·	1.9 km	MPC; JPL
880634	2014 WS_{395}	—	November 18, 2003	Kitt Peak	Spacewatch	·	1.6 km	MPC; JPL
880635	2014 WV_{397}	—	September 7, 2008	Siding Spring	SSS	T_{j} (2.96)	2.3 km	MPC; JPL
880636	2014 WE_{401}	—	November 1, 2014	Mount Lemmon	Mount Lemmon Survey	·	680 m	MPC; JPL
880637	2014 WF_{402}	—	December 18, 2009	Mount Lemmon	Mount Lemmon Survey	HYG	1.7 km	MPC; JPL
880638	2014 WO_{408}	—	November 26, 2014	Haleakala	Pan-STARRS 1	EOS	1.2 km	MPC; JPL
880639	2014 WM_{411}	—	November 26, 2014	Haleakala	Pan-STARRS 1	ERI	1.1 km	MPC; JPL
880640	2014 WB_{419}	—	December 28, 2005	Kitt Peak	Spacewatch	·	1.2 km	MPC; JPL
880641	2014 WZ_{419}	—	November 26, 2014	Mount Lemmon	Mount Lemmon Survey	·	1.6 km	MPC; JPL
880642	2014 WG_{420}	—	November 26, 2014	Haleakala	Pan-STARRS 1	EOS	1.3 km	MPC; JPL
880643	2014 WZ_{425}	—	November 9, 2008	Kitt Peak	Spacewatch	·	1.9 km	MPC; JPL
880644	2014 WF_{430}	—	February 16, 2010	Catalina	CSS	THB	2.5 km	MPC; JPL
880645	2014 WW_{430}	—	October 22, 2014	Mount Lemmon	Mount Lemmon Survey	·	1.5 km	MPC; JPL
880646	2014 WD_{432}	—	September 25, 2014	Mount Lemmon	Mount Lemmon Survey	·	1.7 km	MPC; JPL
880647	2014 WF_{432}	—	March 11, 2010	WISE	WISE	·	1.6 km	MPC; JPL
880648	2014 WQ_{433}	—	November 17, 2014	Haleakala	Pan-STARRS 1	EOS	1.1 km	MPC; JPL
880649	2014 WS_{436}	—	November 24, 2014	Mount Lemmon	Mount Lemmon Survey	·	2.0 km	MPC; JPL
880650	2014 WB_{452}	—	November 27, 2014	Haleakala	Pan-STARRS 1	TIR	1.9 km	MPC; JPL
880651	2014 WR_{453}	—	October 15, 2014	Catalina	CSS	·	2.2 km	MPC; JPL
880652	2014 WQ_{454}	—	November 27, 2014	Haleakala	Pan-STARRS 1	·	1.9 km	MPC; JPL
880653	2014 WB_{460}	—	November 12, 2014	Haleakala	Pan-STARRS 1	·	690 m	MPC; JPL
880654	2014 WH_{465}	—	November 27, 2014	Haleakala	Pan-STARRS 1	T_{j} (2.99)	2.4 km	MPC; JPL
880655	2014 WT_{465}	—	November 27, 2014	Haleakala	Pan-STARRS 1	·	1.3 km	MPC; JPL
880656	2014 WZ_{469}	—	October 21, 2014	Mount Lemmon	Mount Lemmon Survey	·	780 m	MPC; JPL
880657	2014 WS_{471}	—	May 19, 2006	Mount Lemmon	Mount Lemmon Survey	·	1.8 km	MPC; JPL
880658	2014 WV_{473}	—	November 28, 2014	Mount Lemmon	Mount Lemmon Survey	·	1.8 km	MPC; JPL
880659	2014 WZ_{476}	—	September 9, 2008	Kitt Peak	Spacewatch	·	2.0 km	MPC; JPL
880660	2014 WA_{479}	—	November 28, 2014	Haleakala	Pan-STARRS 1	PHO	610 m	MPC; JPL
880661	2014 WD_{485}	—	November 20, 2014	Mount Lemmon	Mount Lemmon Survey	·	420 m	MPC; JPL
880662	2014 WC_{486}	—	October 24, 2014	Mount Lemmon	Mount Lemmon Survey	·	1.3 km	MPC; JPL
880663	2014 WH_{488}	—	November 17, 2014	Haleakala	Pan-STARRS 1	·	1.6 km	MPC; JPL
880664	2014 WV_{501}	—	March 28, 2010	WISE	WISE	EUP	2.8 km	MPC; JPL
880665	2014 WP_{509}	—	October 23, 2010	Haleakala	Pan-STARRS 1	·	571 km	MPC; JPL
880666	2014 WC_{511}	—	November 29, 2014	Haleakala	Pan-STARRS 1	H	400 m	MPC; JPL
880667	2014 WL_{511}	—	November 26, 2014	Haleakala	Pan-STARRS 1	L5	5.8 km	MPC; JPL
880668	2014 WB_{513}	—	November 23, 2014	Haleakala	Pan-STARRS 1	H	420 m	MPC; JPL
880669	2014 WF_{515}	—	November 30, 2014	Haleakala	Pan-STARRS 1	THB	1.8 km	MPC; JPL
880670	2014 WF_{519}	—	October 29, 2008	Mount Lemmon	Mount Lemmon Survey	·	1.7 km	MPC; JPL
880671	2014 WW_{519}	—	September 28, 2008	Mount Lemmon	Mount Lemmon Survey	·	1.8 km	MPC; JPL
880672	2014 WR_{521}	—	December 18, 2009	Mount Lemmon	Mount Lemmon Survey	·	1.9 km	MPC; JPL
880673	2014 WW_{524}	—	April 12, 2010	WISE	WISE	·	1.8 km	MPC; JPL
880674	2014 WY_{525}	—	November 20, 2014	Haleakala	Pan-STARRS 1	·	1.8 km	MPC; JPL
880675	2014 WE_{526}	—	November 21, 2014	Haleakala	Pan-STARRS 1	EOS	1.2 km	MPC; JPL
880676	2014 WX_{527}	—	August 15, 2013	Haleakala	Pan-STARRS 1	·	1.9 km	MPC; JPL
880677	2014 WQ_{534}	—	November 30, 2014	Haleakala	Pan-STARRS 1	·	2.3 km	MPC; JPL
880678	2014 WX_{536}	—	November 26, 2014	Haleakala	Pan-STARRS 1	T_{j} (2.98)	3.0 km	MPC; JPL
880679	2014 WG_{537}	—	November 27, 2014	Haleakala	Pan-STARRS 1	·	730 m	MPC; JPL
880680	2014 WU_{538}	—	November 17, 2014	Haleakala	Pan-STARRS 1	·	2.5 km	MPC; JPL
880681	2014 WM_{539}	—	November 21, 2014	Westfield	International Astronomical Search Collaboration	·	2.1 km	MPC; JPL
880682	2014 WA_{540}	—	October 28, 2010	Mount Lemmon	Mount Lemmon Survey	PHO	610 m	MPC; JPL
880683	2014 WO_{541}	—	April 10, 2010	WISE	WISE	·	1.9 km	MPC; JPL
880684	2014 WS_{541}	—	November 28, 2014	Kitt Peak	Spacewatch	EOS	1.2 km	MPC; JPL
880685	2014 WM_{543}	—	November 20, 2014	Mount Lemmon	Mount Lemmon Survey	·	1.5 km	MPC; JPL
880686	2014 WW_{543}	—	November 29, 2014	Kitt Peak	Spacewatch	·	3.7 km	MPC; JPL
880687	2014 WX_{543}	—	November 23, 2014	Haleakala	Pan-STARRS 1	·	2.0 km	MPC; JPL
880688	2014 WY_{543}	—	March 18, 2018	Haleakala	Pan-STARRS 1	·	2.1 km	MPC; JPL
880689	2014 WC_{544}	—	November 17, 2014	Haleakala	Pan-STARRS 1	TIR	2.2 km	MPC; JPL
880690	2014 WV_{544}	—	November 19, 2014	Mount Lemmon	Mount Lemmon Survey	·	1.8 km	MPC; JPL
880691	2014 WB_{545}	—	November 17, 2014	Haleakala	Pan-STARRS 1	·	1.7 km	MPC; JPL
880692	2014 WC_{545}	—	November 22, 2014	Haleakala	Pan-STARRS 1	·	1.7 km	MPC; JPL
880693	2014 WH_{545}	—	November 27, 2014	Mount Lemmon	Mount Lemmon Survey	THB	2.1 km	MPC; JPL
880694	2014 WL_{545}	—	November 17, 2014	Haleakala	Pan-STARRS 1	·	1.8 km	MPC; JPL
880695	2014 WV_{545}	—	November 27, 2014	Haleakala	Pan-STARRS 1	EOS	1.3 km	MPC; JPL
880696	2014 WC_{547}	—	November 22, 2014	Haleakala	Pan-STARRS 1	·	1.8 km	MPC; JPL
880697	2014 WG_{547}	—	November 22, 2014	Haleakala	Pan-STARRS 1	TEL	950 m	MPC; JPL
880698	2014 WH_{547}	—	November 21, 2014	Mount Lemmon	Mount Lemmon Survey	·	1.4 km	MPC; JPL
880699	2014 WJ_{548}	—	November 21, 2014	Haleakala	Pan-STARRS 1	·	2.2 km	MPC; JPL
880700	2014 WT_{549}	—	November 22, 2014	Haleakala	Pan-STARRS 1	·	1.5 km	MPC; JPL

== 880701–880800 ==
back to top

Designation			Discovery			Properties		Ref
Permanent	Provisional	Named after	Date	Site	Discoverer(s)	Category	Diam.	Ref
880701	2014 WA_{550}	—	November 26, 2014	Haleakala	Pan-STARRS 1	·	2.0 km	MPC; JPL
880702	2014 WK_{550}	—	November 22, 2014	Mount Lemmon	Mount Lemmon Survey	EUP	2.4 km	MPC; JPL
880703	2014 WS_{551}	—	November 29, 2014	Mount Lemmon	Mount Lemmon Survey	·	1.9 km	MPC; JPL
880704	2014 WD_{552}	—	November 26, 2014	Haleakala	Pan-STARRS 1	·	1.7 km	MPC; JPL
880705	2014 WQ_{555}	—	November 17, 2014	Haleakala	Pan-STARRS 1	·	1.1 km	MPC; JPL
880706	2014 WJ_{556}	—	November 17, 2014	Haleakala	Pan-STARRS 1	·	2.0 km	MPC; JPL
880707	2014 WW_{557}	—	October 16, 2009	Catalina	CSS	·	1.2 km	MPC; JPL
880708	2014 WD_{559}	—	November 26, 2014	Haleakala	Pan-STARRS 1	·	1.6 km	MPC; JPL
880709	2014 WN_{563}	—	November 23, 2014	Haleakala	Pan-STARRS 1	·	2.1 km	MPC; JPL
880710	2014 WD_{566}	—	November 26, 2014	Haleakala	Pan-STARRS 1	TIR	2.1 km	MPC; JPL
880711	2014 WE_{566}	—	November 26, 2014	Haleakala	Pan-STARRS 1	·	1.5 km	MPC; JPL
880712	2014 WW_{566}	—	November 27, 2014	Haleakala	Pan-STARRS 1	·	2.2 km	MPC; JPL
880713	2014 WX_{569}	—	November 26, 2014	Haleakala	Pan-STARRS 1	·	1.9 km	MPC; JPL
880714	2014 WG_{570}	—	November 26, 2014	Haleakala	Pan-STARRS 1	·	1.8 km	MPC; JPL
880715	2014 WF_{582}	—	November 26, 2014	Haleakala	Pan-STARRS 1	TIR	2.0 km	MPC; JPL
880716	2014 WK_{584}	—	November 26, 2014	Mount Lemmon	Mount Lemmon Survey	·	1.8 km	MPC; JPL
880717	2014 WM_{585}	—	November 17, 2014	Haleakala	Pan-STARRS 1	·	1.8 km	MPC; JPL
880718	2014 WZ_{585}	—	November 17, 2014	Haleakala	Pan-STARRS 1	·	2.6 km	MPC; JPL
880719	2014 WS_{588}	—	November 17, 2014	Haleakala	Pan-STARRS 1	·	1.3 km	MPC; JPL
880720	2014 WK_{598}	—	November 26, 2014	Mount Lemmon	Mount Lemmon Survey	H	420 m	MPC; JPL
880721	2014 WL_{599}	—	November 29, 2014	Mount Lemmon	Mount Lemmon Survey	NYS	820 m	MPC; JPL
880722	2014 WD_{601}	—	November 20, 2014	Mount Lemmon	Mount Lemmon Survey	PHO	720 m	MPC; JPL
880723	2014 WO_{601}	—	November 17, 2014	Haleakala	Pan-STARRS 1	·	910 m	MPC; JPL
880724	2014 WW_{603}	—	November 17, 2014	Haleakala	Pan-STARRS 1	L5	6.4 km	MPC; JPL
880725	2014 WY_{612}	—	November 21, 2014	Haleakala	Pan-STARRS 1	EOS	1.0 km	MPC; JPL
880726	2014 XU_{1}	—	December 1, 2014	Haleakala	Pan-STARRS 1	·	770 m	MPC; JPL
880727	2014 XZ_{1}	—	March 19, 2010	Kitt Peak	Spacewatch	THB	2.1 km	MPC; JPL
880728	2014 XM_{5}	—	November 24, 2014	Kitt Peak	Spacewatch	·	1.6 km	MPC; JPL
880729	2014 XE_{12}	—	November 22, 2014	Mount Lemmon	Mount Lemmon Survey	NYS	830 m	MPC; JPL
880730	2014 XY_{12}	—	November 16, 2014	Mount Lemmon	Mount Lemmon Survey	EUP	2.6 km	MPC; JPL
880731	2014 XY_{19}	—	October 26, 2014	Mount Lemmon	Mount Lemmon Survey	·	680 m	MPC; JPL
880732	2014 XF_{24}	—	December 11, 2014	Mount Lemmon	Mount Lemmon Survey	·	1.9 km	MPC; JPL
880733	2014 XT_{27}	—	November 3, 2014	Mount Lemmon	Mount Lemmon Survey	·	1.3 km	MPC; JPL
880734	2014 XO_{30}	—	November 21, 2009	Mount Lemmon	Mount Lemmon Survey	·	1.7 km	MPC; JPL
880735	2014 XN_{35}	—	December 10, 2014	Mount Lemmon	Mount Lemmon Survey	·	1.1 km	MPC; JPL
880736	2014 XR_{44}	—	December 1, 2014	Haleakala	Pan-STARRS 1	critical	790 m	MPC; JPL
880737	2014 XT_{44}	—	February 17, 2010	Catalina	CSS	T_{j} (2.99) · EUP	3.2 km	MPC; JPL
880738	2014 XD_{46}	—	December 1, 2014	Haleakala	Pan-STARRS 1	critical	2.2 km	MPC; JPL
880739	2014 XG_{46}	—	November 9, 2008	Kitt Peak	Spacewatch	·	2.1 km	MPC; JPL
880740	2014 XR_{46}	—	December 12, 2014	Haleakala	Pan-STARRS 1	·	2.5 km	MPC; JPL
880741	2014 XH_{48}	—	December 8, 2014	Haleakala	Pan-STARRS 1	PHO	890 m	MPC; JPL
880742	2014 XO_{48}	—	December 10, 2014	Mount Lemmon	Mount Lemmon Survey	·	3.0 km	MPC; JPL
880743	2014 XT_{48}	—	December 1, 2014	Haleakala	Pan-STARRS 1	T_{j} (2.99)	2.0 km	MPC; JPL
880744	2014 XZ_{48}	—	December 12, 2014	Haleakala	Pan-STARRS 1	TIR	1.8 km	MPC; JPL
880745	2014 XA_{53}	—	December 11, 2014	Mount Lemmon	Mount Lemmon Survey	·	1.4 km	MPC; JPL
880746	2014 YB_{2}	—	September 9, 2013	Haleakala	Pan-STARRS 1	·	2.1 km	MPC; JPL
880747	2014 YC_{4}	—	December 18, 2014	Haleakala	Pan-STARRS 1	·	2.2 km	MPC; JPL
880748	2014 YC_{5}	—	December 17, 2003	Kitt Peak	Spacewatch	EUP	2.7 km	MPC; JPL
880749	2014 YP_{7}	—	December 20, 2014	Kitt Peak	Spacewatch	·	1.6 km	MPC; JPL
880750	2014 YK_{9}	—	December 21, 2014	Haleakala	Pan-STARRS 1	AMO	660 m	MPC; JPL
880751	2014 YL_{10}	—	November 26, 2014	Haleakala	Pan-STARRS 1	·	1.6 km	MPC; JPL
880752	2014 YH_{11}	—	December 18, 2003	Socorro	LINEAR	·	2.1 km	MPC; JPL
880753	2014 YJ_{11}	—	November 26, 2014	Haleakala	Pan-STARRS 1	·	1.9 km	MPC; JPL
880754	2014 YB_{15}	—	December 24, 2006	Kitt Peak	Spacewatch	H	370 m	MPC; JPL
880755	2014 YA_{17}	—	December 20, 2014	Haleakala	Pan-STARRS 1	·	2.4 km	MPC; JPL
880756	2014 YM_{17}	—	April 12, 2010	WISE	WISE	·	2.3 km	MPC; JPL
880757	2014 YD_{19}	—	December 3, 2014	Haleakala	Pan-STARRS 1	·	1.6 km	MPC; JPL
880758	2014 YJ_{24}	—	January 16, 2004	Palomar	NEAT	T_{j} (2.99)	3.1 km	MPC; JPL
880759	2014 YJ_{26}	—	November 15, 2003	Kitt Peak	Spacewatch	·	1.9 km	MPC; JPL
880760	2014 YK_{33}	—	December 27, 2014	Mount Lemmon	Mount Lemmon Survey	TIR	2.1 km	MPC; JPL
880761	2014 YT_{50}	—	December 25, 2014	Haleakala	Pan-STARRS 1	H	410 m	MPC; JPL
880762	2014 YJ_{52}	—	December 21, 2014	Haleakala	Pan-STARRS 1	·	650 m	MPC; JPL
880763	2014 YM_{52}	—	December 18, 2014	Haleakala	Pan-STARRS 1	PHO	720 m	MPC; JPL
880764	2014 YA_{53}	—	December 21, 2014	Haleakala	Pan-STARRS 1	·	2.3 km	MPC; JPL
880765	2014 YL_{53}	—	December 29, 2014	Haleakala	Pan-STARRS 1	·	2.1 km	MPC; JPL
880766	2014 YV_{54}	—	March 30, 2004	Kitt Peak	Spacewatch	·	2.7 km	MPC; JPL
880767	2014 YK_{58}	—	November 27, 2013	Haleakala	Pan-STARRS 1	(10654)	2.8 km	MPC; JPL
880768	2014 YZ_{59}	—	December 21, 2014	Haleakala	Pan-STARRS 1	·	2.0 km	MPC; JPL
880769	2014 YA_{65}	—	December 29, 2014	Haleakala	Pan-STARRS 1	·	2.3 km	MPC; JPL
880770	2014 YA_{66}	—	June 24, 2010	WISE	WISE	·	2.3 km	MPC; JPL
880771	2014 YQ_{67}	—	December 16, 2014	Haleakala	Pan-STARRS 1	·	1.4 km	MPC; JPL
880772	2014 YR_{67}	—	December 29, 2014	Mount Lemmon	Mount Lemmon Survey	·	1.1 km	MPC; JPL
880773	2014 YD_{68}	—	December 30, 2014	Mount Lemmon	Mount Lemmon Survey	·	1.7 km	MPC; JPL
880774	2014 YM_{68}	—	October 30, 2002	Kitt Peak	Spacewatch	EUP	2.1 km	MPC; JPL
880775	2014 YN_{68}	—	September 28, 2008	Mount Lemmon	Mount Lemmon Survey	·	1.7 km	MPC; JPL
880776	2014 YR_{68}	—	December 20, 2014	Haleakala	Pan-STARRS 1	PHO	940 m	MPC; JPL
880777	2014 YK_{69}	—	December 25, 2014	Haleakala	Pan-STARRS 1	LUT	3.2 km	MPC; JPL
880778	2014 YO_{69}	—	December 16, 2014	Haleakala	Pan-STARRS 1	TIR	2.0 km	MPC; JPL
880779	2014 YW_{69}	—	December 24, 2014	Mount Lemmon	Mount Lemmon Survey	·	2.3 km	MPC; JPL
880780	2014 YV_{70}	—	December 21, 2014	Haleakala	Pan-STARRS 1	·	1.9 km	MPC; JPL
880781	2014 YP_{72}	—	December 23, 2014	Mount Lemmon	Mount Lemmon Survey	H	380 m	MPC; JPL
880782	2014 YX_{72}	—	December 21, 2014	Haleakala	Pan-STARRS 1	·	920 m	MPC; JPL
880783	2014 YD_{74}	—	December 21, 2014	Haleakala	Pan-STARRS 1	·	2.0 km	MPC; JPL
880784	2014 YE_{75}	—	December 26, 2014	Roque de los Muchachos	EURONEAR	THM	1.4 km	MPC; JPL
880785	2014 YJ_{75}	—	December 20, 2014	Haleakala	Pan-STARRS 1	·	2.0 km	MPC; JPL
880786	2014 YJ_{76}	—	December 20, 2014	Haleakala	Pan-STARRS 1	EOS	1.3 km	MPC; JPL
880787	2014 YW_{77}	—	December 21, 2014	Haleakala	Pan-STARRS 1	·	2.3 km	MPC; JPL
880788	2014 YH_{78}	—	December 26, 2014	Haleakala	Pan-STARRS 1	·	2.4 km	MPC; JPL
880789	2014 YR_{79}	—	December 29, 2014	Mount Lemmon	Mount Lemmon Survey	EOS	1.3 km	MPC; JPL
880790	2014 YJ_{84}	—	December 20, 2014	Haleakala	Pan-STARRS 1	·	1.6 km	MPC; JPL
880791	2014 YD_{85}	—	December 29, 2014	Haleakala	Pan-STARRS 1	THB	1.9 km	MPC; JPL
880792	2014 YO_{85}	—	December 21, 2014	Haleakala	Pan-STARRS 1	·	2.5 km	MPC; JPL
880793	2014 YF_{86}	—	December 29, 2014	Haleakala	Pan-STARRS 1	·	2.4 km	MPC; JPL
880794	2014 YK_{86}	—	January 8, 2010	WISE	WISE	·	2.2 km	MPC; JPL
880795	2014 YN_{87}	—	December 19, 2014	Haleakala	Pan-STARRS 1	T_{j} (2.94)	2.6 km	MPC; JPL
880796	2014 YN_{88}	—	March 17, 2005	Kitt Peak	Spacewatch	·	1.7 km	MPC; JPL
880797	2014 YW_{89}	—	December 29, 2014	Mount Lemmon	Mount Lemmon Survey	·	740 m	MPC; JPL
880798	2014 YS_{90}	—	December 21, 2014	Haleakala	Pan-STARRS 1	·	2.1 km	MPC; JPL
880799	2014 YY_{90}	—	December 24, 2014	Mount Lemmon	Mount Lemmon Survey	TIR	2.3 km	MPC; JPL
880800	2014 YG_{95}	—	December 21, 2014	Haleakala	Pan-STARRS 1	·	1.9 km	MPC; JPL

== 880801–880900 ==
back to top

Designation			Discovery			Properties		Ref
Permanent	Provisional	Named after	Date	Site	Discoverer(s)	Category	Diam.	Ref
880801	2014 YF_{100}	—	December 23, 2014	Mount Lemmon	Mount Lemmon Survey	L5	7.8 km	MPC; JPL
880802	2014 YG_{103}	—	December 21, 2014	Haleakala	Pan-STARRS 1	·	1.8 km	MPC; JPL
880803	2014 YJ_{103}	—	December 29, 2014	Haleakala	Pan-STARRS 1	·	1.8 km	MPC; JPL
880804	2015 AK_{2}	—	November 16, 2014	Mount Lemmon	Mount Lemmon Survey	H	370 m	MPC; JPL
880805	2015 AR_{5}	—	January 11, 2015	Haleakala	Pan-STARRS 1	·	2.5 km	MPC; JPL
880806	2015 AZ_{5}	—	January 11, 2015	Haleakala	Pan-STARRS 1	·	2.9 km	MPC; JPL
880807	2015 AK_{6}	—	December 12, 2014	Haleakala	Pan-STARRS 1	TIR	1.4 km	MPC; JPL
880808	2015 AZ_{9}	—	January 11, 2015	Haleakala	Pan-STARRS 1	·	1.7 km	MPC; JPL
880809	2015 AH_{12}	—	January 11, 2015	Haleakala	Pan-STARRS 1	T_{j} (2.99)	2.1 km	MPC; JPL
880810	2015 AM_{12}	—	February 12, 2004	Kitt Peak	Spacewatch	EUP	4.0 km	MPC; JPL
880811	2015 AX_{14}	—	January 11, 2015	Haleakala	Pan-STARRS 1	·	2.2 km	MPC; JPL
880812	2015 AN_{15}	—	October 25, 2008	Kitt Peak	Spacewatch	·	1.9 km	MPC; JPL
880813	2015 AM_{25}	—	January 12, 2015	Haleakala	Pan-STARRS 1	·	2.4 km	MPC; JPL
880814	2015 AS_{30}	—	December 29, 2014	Mount Lemmon	Mount Lemmon Survey	VER	2.0 km	MPC; JPL
880815	2015 AN_{33}	—	January 13, 2015	Haleakala	Pan-STARRS 1	LIX	2.8 km	MPC; JPL
880816	2015 AU_{39}	—	January 13, 2015	Haleakala	Pan-STARRS 1	·	2.3 km	MPC; JPL
880817	2015 AF_{40}	—	October 31, 2008	Kitt Peak	Spacewatch	THM	1.6 km	MPC; JPL
880818	2015 AW_{43}	—	December 27, 2014	Haleakala	Pan-STARRS 1	H	420 m	MPC; JPL
880819	2015 AS_{55}	—	January 13, 2015	Haleakala	Pan-STARRS 1	·	2.3 km	MPC; JPL
880820	2015 AC_{56}	—	January 13, 2015	Haleakala	Pan-STARRS 1	·	2.2 km	MPC; JPL
880821	2015 AN_{58}	—	January 13, 2015	Haleakala	Pan-STARRS 1	·	2.3 km	MPC; JPL
880822	2015 AJ_{59}	—	January 13, 2015	Haleakala	Pan-STARRS 1	·	2.2 km	MPC; JPL
880823	2015 AX_{61}	—	January 13, 2015	Haleakala	Pan-STARRS 1	VER	1.8 km	MPC; JPL
880824	2015 AY_{63}	—	November 6, 2008	Kitt Peak	Spacewatch	LIX	2.6 km	MPC; JPL
880825	2015 AJ_{64}	—	January 13, 2015	Haleakala	Pan-STARRS 1	·	2.1 km	MPC; JPL
880826	2015 AB_{72}	—	January 13, 2015	Haleakala	Pan-STARRS 1	·	2.1 km	MPC; JPL
880827	2015 AE_{77}	—	July 14, 2013	Haleakala	Pan-STARRS 1	THB	1.9 km	MPC; JPL
880828	2015 AD_{81}	—	January 13, 2015	Haleakala	Pan-STARRS 1	·	2.3 km	MPC; JPL
880829	2015 AQ_{85}	—	December 21, 2014	Haleakala	Pan-STARRS 1	HYG	2.0 km	MPC; JPL
880830	2015 AV_{87}	—	January 13, 2015	Haleakala	Pan-STARRS 1	EOS	1.2 km	MPC; JPL
880831	2015 AL_{94}	—	October 3, 2014	Haleakala	Pan-STARRS 1	T_{j} (2.9)	1.9 km	MPC; JPL
880832	2015 AR_{94}	—	November 21, 2014	Haleakala	Pan-STARRS 1	·	2.3 km	MPC; JPL
880833	2015 AG_{97}	—	January 8, 2015	Haleakala	Pan-STARRS 1	·	1.9 km	MPC; JPL
880834	2015 AN_{103}	—	January 14, 2015	Haleakala	Pan-STARRS 1	VER	1.7 km	MPC; JPL
880835	2015 AA_{105}	—	September 6, 2013	Mount Lemmon	Mount Lemmon Survey	·	2.0 km	MPC; JPL
880836	2015 AK_{107}	—	January 14, 2015	Haleakala	Pan-STARRS 1	VER	2.0 km	MPC; JPL
880837	2015 AP_{107}	—	November 29, 2014	Haleakala	Pan-STARRS 1	·	1.5 km	MPC; JPL
880838	2015 AR_{127}	—	December 21, 2014	Haleakala	Pan-STARRS 1	·	2.0 km	MPC; JPL
880839	2015 AB_{128}	—	January 14, 2015	Haleakala	Pan-STARRS 1	·	1.2 km	MPC; JPL
880840	2015 AK_{128}	—	January 14, 2015	Haleakala	Pan-STARRS 1	·	2.2 km	MPC; JPL
880841	2015 AU_{128}	—	January 14, 2015	Haleakala	Pan-STARRS 1	·	2.2 km	MPC; JPL
880842	2015 AD_{135}	—	January 14, 2015	Haleakala	Pan-STARRS 1	·	2.5 km	MPC; JPL
880843	2015 AV_{136}	—	December 21, 2014	Haleakala	Pan-STARRS 1	·	2.6 km	MPC; JPL
880844	2015 AC_{144}	—	December 21, 2014	Haleakala	Pan-STARRS 1	·	2.8 km	MPC; JPL
880845	2015 AU_{151}	—	January 14, 2015	Haleakala	Pan-STARRS 1	·	1.2 km	MPC; JPL
880846	2015 AT_{152}	—	February 19, 2004	Socorro	LINEAR	T_{j} (2.99)	2.5 km	MPC; JPL
880847	2015 AV_{155}	—	January 14, 2015	Haleakala	Pan-STARRS 1	·	1.6 km	MPC; JPL
880848	2015 AA_{158}	—	September 6, 2013	Mount Lemmon	Mount Lemmon Survey	THM	1.5 km	MPC; JPL
880849	2015 AJ_{164}	—	January 14, 2015	Haleakala	Pan-STARRS 1	·	820 m	MPC; JPL
880850	2015 AJ_{170}	—	January 14, 2015	Haleakala	Pan-STARRS 1	LIX	2.4 km	MPC; JPL
880851	2015 AZ_{173}	—	January 14, 2015	Haleakala	Pan-STARRS 1	·	1.2 km	MPC; JPL
880852	2015 AG_{174}	—	May 3, 2008	Kitt Peak	Spacewatch	·	1.4 km	MPC; JPL
880853	2015 AS_{174}	—	December 30, 2014	Haleakala	Pan-STARRS 1	H	450 m	MPC; JPL
880854	2015 AA_{175}	—	January 14, 2015	Haleakala	Pan-STARRS 1	·	950 m	MPC; JPL
880855	2015 AK_{175}	—	December 26, 2014	Haleakala	Pan-STARRS 1	·	1.7 km	MPC; JPL
880856	2015 AD_{177}	—	January 14, 2015	Haleakala	Pan-STARRS 1	·	1.1 km	MPC; JPL
880857	2015 AL_{181}	—	January 14, 2015	Haleakala	Pan-STARRS 1	·	2.5 km	MPC; JPL
880858	2015 AS_{181}	—	January 14, 2015	Haleakala	Pan-STARRS 1	TIR	2.2 km	MPC; JPL
880859	2015 AA_{187}	—	January 14, 2015	Haleakala	Pan-STARRS 1	·	1.1 km	MPC; JPL
880860	2015 AT_{195}	—	January 14, 2015	Haleakala	Pan-STARRS 1	NYS	940 m	MPC; JPL
880861	2015 AJ_{196}	—	January 14, 2015	Haleakala	Pan-STARRS 1	·	2.1 km	MPC; JPL
880862	2015 AS_{199}	—	November 19, 2008	Kitt Peak	Spacewatch	·	2.6 km	MPC; JPL
880863	2015 AE_{200}	—	January 14, 2015	Haleakala	Pan-STARRS 1	·	2.4 km	MPC; JPL
880864	2015 AR_{208}	—	September 18, 2014	Haleakala	Pan-STARRS 1	·	1.3 km	MPC; JPL
880865	2015 AP_{209}	—	September 20, 2014	Haleakala	Pan-STARRS 1	·	1.2 km	MPC; JPL
880866	2015 AB_{212}	—	November 20, 2014	Haleakala	Pan-STARRS 1	URS	2.2 km	MPC; JPL
880867	2015 AP_{213}	—	January 15, 2015	Haleakala	Pan-STARRS 1	·	2.0 km	MPC; JPL
880868	2015 AG_{221}	—	January 15, 2015	Haleakala	Pan-STARRS 1	·	2.2 km	MPC; JPL
880869	2015 AY_{221}	—	September 24, 2008	Mount Lemmon	Mount Lemmon Survey	·	1.7 km	MPC; JPL
880870	2015 AZ_{222}	—	January 15, 2015	Haleakala	Pan-STARRS 1	·	2.1 km	MPC; JPL
880871	2015 AO_{223}	—	November 9, 2013	Mount Lemmon	Mount Lemmon Survey	·	2.2 km	MPC; JPL
880872	2015 AT_{231}	—	January 15, 2015	Haleakala	Pan-STARRS 1	·	1.6 km	MPC; JPL
880873	2015 AC_{234}	—	December 31, 2008	Kitt Peak	Spacewatch	·	2.1 km	MPC; JPL
880874	2015 AH_{234}	—	January 15, 2015	Haleakala	Pan-STARRS 1	MAR	780 m	MPC; JPL
880875	2015 AN_{242}	—	January 15, 2015	Haleakala	Pan-STARRS 1	·	1.8 km	MPC; JPL
880876	2015 AM_{245}	—	February 16, 2004	Kitt Peak	Spacewatch	·	1.9 km	MPC; JPL
880877	2015 AZ_{246}	—	March 8, 2005	Kitt Peak	Spacewatch	·	1.6 km	MPC; JPL
880878	2015 AB_{248}	—	December 26, 2014	Haleakala	Pan-STARRS 1	·	2.0 km	MPC; JPL
880879	2015 AN_{250}	—	November 6, 2008	Mount Lemmon	Mount Lemmon Survey	·	2.0 km	MPC; JPL
880880	2015 AO_{251}	—	January 14, 2015	Haleakala	Pan-STARRS 1	·	1.8 km	MPC; JPL
880881	2015 AP_{251}	—	November 26, 2014	Haleakala	Pan-STARRS 1	·	1.5 km	MPC; JPL
880882	2015 AQ_{251}	—	January 14, 2015	Haleakala	Pan-STARRS 1	L5	6.8 km	MPC; JPL
880883	2015 AF_{254}	—	January 14, 2015	Haleakala	Pan-STARRS 1	·	2.1 km	MPC; JPL
880884	2015 AC_{255}	—	October 5, 2014	Haleakala	Pan-STARRS 1	H	400 m	MPC; JPL
880885	2015 AL_{256}	—	January 12, 2015	Haleakala	Pan-STARRS 1	·	2.2 km	MPC; JPL
880886	2015 AO_{262}	—	September 28, 2013	Mount Lemmon	Mount Lemmon Survey	TIR	2.0 km	MPC; JPL
880887	2015 AU_{269}	—	January 13, 2015	Haleakala	Pan-STARRS 1	·	2.2 km	MPC; JPL
880888	2015 AW_{272}	—	January 13, 2015	Haleakala	Pan-STARRS 1	·	2.1 km	MPC; JPL
880889	2015 AH_{276}	—	December 29, 2014	Haleakala	Pan-STARRS 1	·	1.6 km	MPC; JPL
880890	2015 AB_{278}	—	September 14, 2006	Kitt Peak	Spacewatch	·	720 m	MPC; JPL
880891	2015 AQ_{279}	—	January 15, 2015	Mount Lemmon	Mount Lemmon Survey	·	2.1 km	MPC; JPL
880892	2015 AW_{279}	—	January 15, 2015	Haleakala	Pan-STARRS 1	·	2.3 km	MPC; JPL
880893	2015 AQ_{282}	—	January 12, 2015	Haleakala	Pan-STARRS 1	H	420 m	MPC; JPL
880894	2015 AU_{282}	—	January 13, 2015	Haleakala	Pan-STARRS 1	·	2.0 km	MPC; JPL
880895	2015 AD_{288}	—	December 29, 2014	Haleakala	Pan-STARRS 1	·	1.9 km	MPC; JPL
880896	2015 AM_{288}	—	November 3, 2008	Kitt Peak	Spacewatch	·	2.1 km	MPC; JPL
880897	2015 AX_{294}	—	January 11, 2015	Haleakala	Pan-STARRS 1	(69559)	2.4 km	MPC; JPL
880898	2015 AA_{295}	—	January 13, 2015	Haleakala	Pan-STARRS 1	·	1.7 km	MPC; JPL
880899	2015 AD_{295}	—	March 29, 2016	Haleakala	Pan-STARRS 1	·	2.3 km	MPC; JPL
880900	2015 AG_{295}	—	January 12, 2015	Haleakala	Pan-STARRS 1	H	340 m	MPC; JPL

== 880901–881000 ==
back to top

Designation			Discovery			Properties		Ref
Permanent	Provisional	Named after	Date	Site	Discoverer(s)	Category	Diam.	Ref
880901	2015 AP_{296}	—	January 13, 2015	Haleakala	Pan-STARRS 1	·	830 m	MPC; JPL
880902	2015 AX_{296}	—	January 21, 2015	Mount Lemmon	Mount Lemmon Survey	·	2.1 km	MPC; JPL
880903	2015 AP_{297}	—	January 14, 2015	Haleakala	Pan-STARRS 1	·	1.4 km	MPC; JPL
880904	2015 AT_{297}	—	January 15, 2015	Haleakala	Pan-STARRS 1	·	1.5 km	MPC; JPL
880905	2015 AU_{297}	—	January 14, 2015	Haleakala	Pan-STARRS 1	·	2.3 km	MPC; JPL
880906	2015 AU_{299}	—	January 12, 2015	Haleakala	Pan-STARRS 1	L5	7.3 km	MPC; JPL
880907	2015 AR_{300}	—	January 14, 2015	Haleakala	Pan-STARRS 1	·	2.0 km	MPC; JPL
880908	2015 AC_{301}	—	January 13, 2015	Cerro Paranal	Gaia Ground Based Optical Tracking	·	670 m	MPC; JPL
880909	2015 AP_{301}	—	January 14, 2015	Haleakala	Pan-STARRS 1	THM	1.4 km	MPC; JPL
880910	2015 AJ_{304}	—	January 14, 2015	Haleakala	Pan-STARRS 1	·	870 m	MPC; JPL
880911	2015 AE_{305}	—	January 14, 2015	Haleakala	Pan-STARRS 1	·	2.6 km	MPC; JPL
880912	2015 AO_{309}	—	January 15, 2015	Haleakala	Pan-STARRS 1	·	2.2 km	MPC; JPL
880913	2015 AB_{311}	—	January 14, 2015	Haleakala	Pan-STARRS 1	·	1.5 km	MPC; JPL
880914	2015 BT_{1}	—	October 30, 2010	Mount Lemmon	Mount Lemmon Survey	·	760 m	MPC; JPL
880915	2015 BR_{2}	—	January 16, 2015	Mount Lemmon	Mount Lemmon Survey	(895)	2.6 km	MPC; JPL
880916	2015 BB_{7}	—	November 21, 2014	Haleakala	Pan-STARRS 1	·	520 m	MPC; JPL
880917	2015 BP_{12}	—	November 30, 2014	Haleakala	Pan-STARRS 1	THB	1.9 km	MPC; JPL
880918	2015 BE_{18}	—	January 28, 2004	Kitt Peak	Spacewatch	·	2.1 km	MPC; JPL
880919	2015 BA_{24}	—	January 16, 2015	Haleakala	Pan-STARRS 1	HYG	1.9 km	MPC; JPL
880920	2015 BJ_{29}	—	November 27, 2014	Haleakala	Pan-STARRS 1	·	2.4 km	MPC; JPL
880921	2015 BX_{29}	—	January 16, 2015	Haleakala	Pan-STARRS 1	H	340 m	MPC; JPL
880922	2015 BA_{30}	—	January 16, 2015	Haleakala	Pan-STARRS 1	·	1.9 km	MPC; JPL
880923	2015 BO_{30}	—	January 16, 2015	Haleakala	Pan-STARRS 1	·	2.6 km	MPC; JPL
880924	2015 BV_{31}	—	January 16, 2015	Haleakala	Pan-STARRS 1	·	2.5 km	MPC; JPL
880925	2015 BJ_{32}	—	January 16, 2015	Haleakala	Pan-STARRS 1	·	1.9 km	MPC; JPL
880926	2015 BY_{35}	—	January 16, 2015	Haleakala	Pan-STARRS 1	MAR	990 m	MPC; JPL
880927	2015 BF_{40}	—	December 26, 2014	Haleakala	Pan-STARRS 1	·	1.8 km	MPC; JPL
880928	2015 BB_{42}	—	February 14, 2010	Kitt Peak	Spacewatch	·	1.9 km	MPC; JPL
880929	2015 BD_{43}	—	October 29, 2002	Sacramento Peak	SDSS	·	3.4 km	MPC; JPL
880930	2015 BK_{45}	—	January 17, 2015	Haleakala	Pan-STARRS 1	ELF	2.5 km	MPC; JPL
880931	2015 BV_{46}	—	February 27, 2008	Kitt Peak	Spacewatch	·	830 m	MPC; JPL
880932	2015 BT_{52}	—	November 20, 2014	Haleakala	Pan-STARRS 1	·	1.4 km	MPC; JPL
880933	2015 BV_{55}	—	December 29, 2014	Haleakala	Pan-STARRS 1	·	1.7 km	MPC; JPL
880934	2015 BE_{56}	—	December 29, 2014	Haleakala	Pan-STARRS 1	·	2.4 km	MPC; JPL
880935	2015 BY_{59}	—	January 17, 2015	Haleakala	Pan-STARRS 1	·	2.0 km	MPC; JPL
880936	2015 BZ_{60}	—	January 17, 2015	Haleakala	Pan-STARRS 1	LIX	2.3 km	MPC; JPL
880937	2015 BV_{61}	—	November 26, 2014	Haleakala	Pan-STARRS 1	T_{j} (2.99) · (895)	2.5 km	MPC; JPL
880938	2015 BS_{64}	—	January 17, 2015	Haleakala	Pan-STARRS 1	·	2.1 km	MPC; JPL
880939	2015 BE_{77}	—	January 17, 2015	Haleakala	Pan-STARRS 1	LIX	2.3 km	MPC; JPL
880940	2015 BH_{77}	—	December 31, 2008	Kitt Peak	Spacewatch	·	2.2 km	MPC; JPL
880941	2015 BA_{82}	—	December 29, 2014	Haleakala	Pan-STARRS 1	·	2.0 km	MPC; JPL
880942	2015 BO_{82}	—	January 18, 2015	Mount Lemmon	Mount Lemmon Survey	·	940 m	MPC; JPL
880943	2015 BM_{83}	—	December 29, 2014	Haleakala	Pan-STARRS 1	·	2.5 km	MPC; JPL
880944	2015 BH_{86}	—	December 18, 2014	Haleakala	Pan-STARRS 1	·	3.7 km	MPC; JPL
880945	2015 BS_{87}	—	March 25, 2011	Haleakala	Pan-STARRS 1	·	830 m	MPC; JPL
880946	2015 BE_{91}	—	January 18, 2015	Haleakala	Pan-STARRS 1	HNS	900 m	MPC; JPL
880947	2015 BO_{95}	—	December 15, 2014	Kitt Peak	Spacewatch	·	1.7 km	MPC; JPL
880948	2015 BF_{96}	—	December 29, 2014	Mount Lemmon	Mount Lemmon Survey	·	1.9 km	MPC; JPL
880949	2015 BX_{97}	—	October 3, 2003	Haleakala	NEAT	·	1.0 km	MPC; JPL
880950	2015 BJ_{108}	—	December 11, 2014	Mount Lemmon	Mount Lemmon Survey	·	1.2 km	MPC; JPL
880951	2015 BX_{108}	—	December 29, 2014	Haleakala	Pan-STARRS 1	·	2.2 km	MPC; JPL
880952	2015 BC_{109}	—	January 17, 2015	Mount Lemmon	Mount Lemmon Survey	·	2.1 km	MPC; JPL
880953	2015 BG_{125}	—	January 17, 2015	Haleakala	Pan-STARRS 1	EOS	1.4 km	MPC; JPL
880954	2015 BT_{125}	—	April 14, 2008	Kitt Peak	Spacewatch	·	830 m	MPC; JPL
880955	2015 BS_{129}	—	January 17, 2015	Haleakala	Pan-STARRS 1	·	2.2 km	MPC; JPL
880956	2015 BE_{130}	—	January 17, 2015	Haleakala	Pan-STARRS 1	·	1.9 km	MPC; JPL
880957	2015 BQ_{134}	—	January 17, 2015	Haleakala	Pan-STARRS 1	·	1.8 km	MPC; JPL
880958	2015 BL_{136}	—	January 17, 2015	Haleakala	Pan-STARRS 1	·	1.8 km	MPC; JPL
880959	2015 BR_{143}	—	January 17, 2015	Haleakala	Pan-STARRS 1	·	2.2 km	MPC; JPL
880960	2015 BQ_{144}	—	March 18, 2010	Mount Lemmon	Mount Lemmon Survey	·	2.0 km	MPC; JPL
880961	2015 BR_{145}	—	January 17, 2015	Haleakala	Pan-STARRS 1	·	1.6 km	MPC; JPL
880962	2015 BD_{146}	—	October 1, 2013	Kitt Peak	Spacewatch	THM	1.6 km	MPC; JPL
880963	2015 BQ_{147}	—	March 21, 1999	Sacramento Peak	SDSS	·	1.5 km	MPC; JPL
880964	2015 BX_{150}	—	December 21, 2008	Mount Lemmon	Mount Lemmon Survey	·	2.0 km	MPC; JPL
880965	2015 BW_{156}	—	January 1, 2009	Mount Lemmon	Mount Lemmon Survey	·	2.2 km	MPC; JPL
880966	2015 BU_{157}	—	January 15, 2015	Haleakala	Pan-STARRS 1	·	1.9 km	MPC; JPL
880967	2015 BB_{163}	—	January 17, 2015	Haleakala	Pan-STARRS 1	·	1.9 km	MPC; JPL
880968	2015 BQ_{163}	—	January 17, 2015	Haleakala	Pan-STARRS 1	·	1.8 km	MPC; JPL
880969	2015 BF_{169}	—	February 16, 2004	Kitt Peak	Spacewatch	·	2.9 km	MPC; JPL
880970	2015 BO_{171}	—	January 17, 2015	Haleakala	Pan-STARRS 1	EUP	3.0 km	MPC; JPL
880971	2015 BF_{174}	—	November 10, 2013	Mount Lemmon	Mount Lemmon Survey	MRX	850 m	MPC; JPL
880972	2015 BD_{182}	—	February 6, 2007	Kitt Peak	Spacewatch	·	800 m	MPC; JPL
880973	2015 BD_{203}	—	January 17, 2015	Haleakala	Pan-STARRS 1	·	900 m	MPC; JPL
880974	2015 BC_{204}	—	January 18, 2015	Kitt Peak	Spacewatch	·	2.2 km	MPC; JPL
880975	2015 BC_{209}	—	January 18, 2015	Haleakala	Pan-STARRS 1	·	2.0 km	MPC; JPL
880976	2015 BG_{210}	—	November 17, 2014	Haleakala	Pan-STARRS 1	H	430 m	MPC; JPL
880977	2015 BH_{210}	—	December 26, 2014	Haleakala	Pan-STARRS 1	TIR	1.5 km	MPC; JPL
880978	2015 BO_{210}	—	August 17, 2013	Haleakala	Pan-STARRS 1	·	2.0 km	MPC; JPL
880979	2015 BJ_{216}	—	December 26, 2014	Haleakala	Pan-STARRS 1	·	1.9 km	MPC; JPL
880980	2015 BA_{217}	—	January 18, 2015	Haleakala	Pan-STARRS 1	EOS	1.3 km	MPC; JPL
880981	2015 BH_{217}	—	January 18, 2015	Haleakala	Pan-STARRS 1	·	2.1 km	MPC; JPL
880982	2015 BY_{221}	—	January 18, 2015	Haleakala	Pan-STARRS 1	TIR	1.6 km	MPC; JPL
880983	2015 BD_{226}	—	January 18, 2015	Haleakala	Pan-STARRS 1	·	2.6 km	MPC; JPL
880984	2015 BM_{233}	—	January 18, 2015	Haleakala	Pan-STARRS 1	TIR	2.0 km	MPC; JPL
880985	2015 BL_{235}	—	January 18, 2015	Haleakala	Pan-STARRS 1	EOS	1.3 km	MPC; JPL
880986	2015 BZ_{242}	—	November 28, 2014	Haleakala	Pan-STARRS 1	·	2.2 km	MPC; JPL
880987	2015 BR_{245}	—	January 18, 2015	Haleakala	Pan-STARRS 1	·	1.7 km	MPC; JPL
880988	2015 BN_{247}	—	January 18, 2015	Haleakala	Pan-STARRS 1	·	2.2 km	MPC; JPL
880989	2015 BW_{248}	—	January 18, 2015	Haleakala	Pan-STARRS 1	·	2.1 km	MPC; JPL
880990	2015 BQ_{251}	—	January 16, 2015	Mount Lemmon	Mount Lemmon Survey	TIR	2.0 km	MPC; JPL
880991	2015 BK_{254}	—	January 18, 2015	Haleakala	Pan-STARRS 1	·	2.1 km	MPC; JPL
880992	2015 BY_{268}	—	January 19, 2015	Mount Lemmon	Mount Lemmon Survey	·	2.3 km	MPC; JPL
880993	2015 BB_{270}	—	November 26, 2014	Mount Lemmon	Mount Lemmon Survey	·	1.6 km	MPC; JPL
880994	2015 BR_{277}	—	January 27, 2011	Mount Lemmon	Mount Lemmon Survey	·	770 m	MPC; JPL
880995	2015 BA_{280}	—	November 7, 2008	Mount Lemmon	Mount Lemmon Survey	·	1.5 km	MPC; JPL
880996	2015 BH_{285}	—	November 25, 2014	Haleakala	Pan-STARRS 1	·	1.1 km	MPC; JPL
880997	2015 BS_{290}	—	January 19, 2015	Haleakala	Pan-STARRS 1	·	2.2 km	MPC; JPL
880998	2015 BP_{293}	—	January 15, 2015	Haleakala	Pan-STARRS 1	·	1.9 km	MPC; JPL
880999	2015 BY_{293}	—	January 19, 2015	Haleakala	Pan-STARRS 1	·	1.7 km	MPC; JPL
881000	2015 BS_{294}	—	January 19, 2015	Haleakala	Pan-STARRS 1	·	1.9 km	MPC; JPL

back to top

== Meaning of names ==
As minor planet discoveries are confirmed, they are given a permanent number by the IAU's Minor Planet Center (MPC), and the discoverers can then submit names for them, following the IAU's naming conventions. The list below concerns those minor planets in the specified number-range that have received names, and explains the meanings of those names.

Official naming citations of newly named small Solar System bodies are approved and published in a bulletin by IAU's Working Group for Small Bodies Nomenclature (WGSBN). Before May 2021, citations were published in MPC's Minor Planet Circulars for many decades. Recent citations can also be found on the JPL Small-Body Database (SBDB). Until his death in 2016, German astronomer Lutz D. Schmadel compiled these citations into the Dictionary of Minor Planet Names (DMP) and regularly updated the collection.

Based on Paul Herget's The Names of the Minor Planets, Schmadel also researched the unclear origin of numerous asteroids, most of which had been named prior to World War II. This article incorporates text from this source, which is in the public domain: SBDB New namings may only be added to this list below after official publication as the preannouncement of names is condemned. The WGSBN publishes a comprehensive guideline for the naming rules of non-cometary small Solar System bodies.

Named minor planet	Provisional	This minor planet was named for...	Ref; Catalog
880193 Sopoćko	2014 SL_{99}	Michał Sopoćko, Polish Catholic priest and professor of theology at Stefan Batory University in Vilnius.	IAU · 880193
