= List of unnumbered trans-Neptunian objects: 2026 =

The following is a partial list of unnumbered trans-Neptunian objects for principal designations assigned within 2026. As of November 2026, it contains a total of 1252 bodies. For more information see the description on the main page. Also see list for the previous and next year.

== 2026 ==
Designation	First Observed (discovered)		D (km)	Orbital description						Remarks	Refs
Designation	Date	Observer (Site)	D (km)	Class	a (AU)	e	i (°)	q (AU)	Q (AU)	Remarks	Refs
2026 AA_{27}	—	—	—	—	55.7	0.37	22	35.2	76.1	—	MPC; JPL
2026 AB_{27}	—	—	—	—	42.3	0.13	27	36.6	47.9	—	MPC; JPL
2026 AO_{33}	—	—	—	—	55.0	0.35	11	35.6	74.5	—	MPC; JPL
2026 AP_{33}	—	—	—	—	79.3	0.56	24	34.9	123.7	—	MPC; JPL
2026 AQ_{33}	—	—	—	—	120.2	0.69	29	36.9	203.4	—	MPC; JPL
2026 AR_{33}	—	—	—	—	41.4	0.09	29	37.6	45.2	—	MPC; JPL
2026 AS_{33}	—	—	—	—	30.6	0.18	31	25.0	36.2	—	MPC; JPL
2026 AT_{33}	—	—	—	—	56.0	0.19	31	45.6	66.3	—	MPC; JPL
2026 AU_{33}	—	—	—	—	54.7	0.42	6	31.9	77.4	—	MPC; JPL
2026 AV_{33}	—	—	—	—	45.8	0.23	19	35.3	56.3	—	MPC; JPL
2026 AW_{33}	—	—	—	—	81.8	0.59	23	33.9	129.8	—	MPC; JPL
2026 AX_{33}	—	—	—	—	92.5	0.59	26	37.6	147.3	—	MPC; JPL
2026 AY_{33}	—	—	—	—	52.9	0.31	29	36.6	69.2	—	MPC; JPL
2026 BA_{15}	—	—	—	—	44.8	0.22	13	35.1	54.6	—	MPC; JPL
2026 BB_{15}	—	—	—	—	45.0	0.18	12	36.8	53.1	—	MPC; JPL
2026 BC_{15}	—	—	—	—	41.7	0.07	19	38.8	44.5	—	MPC; JPL
2026 BD_{15}	—	—	—	—	49.5	0.14	8	42.4	56.5	—	MPC; JPL
2026 BE_{15}	—	—	—	—	120.1	0.72	15	33.5	206.6	—	MPC; JPL
2026 BM_{17}	—	—	—	—	45.1	0.22	25	35.2	55.0	—	MPC; JPL
2026 BN_{17}	—	—	—	—	46.8	0.23	26	35.9	57.6	—	MPC; JPL
2026 BO_{17}	—	—	—	—	49.1	0.29	9	34.8	63.3	—	MPC; JPL
2026 BP_{17}	—	—	—	—	47.1	0.20	22	37.8	56.4	—	MPC; JPL
2026 BQ_{17}	—	—	—	—	42.2	0.13	28	36.7	47.6	—	MPC; JPL
2026 BR_{17}	—	—	—	—	45.1	0.12	20	39.5	50.7	—	MPC; JPL
2026 BS_{14}	—	—	—	—	44.2	0.14	54	37.9	50.5	—	MPC; JPL
2026 BS_{17}	—	—	—	—	41.9	0.12	22	36.8	47.0	—	MPC; JPL
2026 BT_{14}	—	—	—	—	59.3	0.40	27	35.7	82.8	—	MPC; JPL
2026 BT_{17}	—	—	—	—	252.5	0.83	24	42.1	462.9	—	MPC; JPL
2026 BU_{17}	—	—	—	—	54.2	0.33	19	36.2	72.2	—	MPC; JPL
2026 BV_{14}	—	—	—	—	49.0	0.21	14	38.8	59.2	—	MPC; JPL
2026 BV_{17}	—	—	—	—	41.1	0.16	19	34.6	47.5	—	MPC; JPL
2026 BW_{17}	—	—	—	—	42.4	0.21	20	33.6	51.2	—	MPC; JPL
2026 BY_{16}	—	—	—	—	39.5	0.11	15	35.1	44.0	—	MPC; JPL
2026 DA_{65}	—	—	—	—	78.6	0.57	21	33.8	123.4	—	MPC; JPL
2026 DA_{67}	—	—	—	—	61.7	0.48	18	32.0	91.5	—	MPC; JPL
2026 DA_{70}	—	—	—	—	41.6	0.09	22	37.6	45.5	—	MPC; JPL
2026 DA_{71}	—	—	—	—	43.5	0.06	4	41.0	46.1	—	MPC; JPL
2026 DA_{72}	—	—	—	—	39.5	0.28	14	28.4	50.5	—	MPC; JPL
2026 DB_{67}	—	—	—	—	109.5	0.66	30	37.2	181.8	—	MPC; JPL
2026 DB_{69}	—	—	—	—	41.5	0.09	18	37.9	45.0	—	MPC; JPL
2026 DB_{70}	—	—	—	—	46.7	0.22	15	36.4	57.0	—	MPC; JPL
2026 DB_{71}	—	—	—	—	44.7	0.05	5	42.4	47.0	—	MPC; JPL
2026 DB_{72}	—	—	—	—	40.3	0.05	19	38.3	42.4	—	MPC; JPL
2026 DC_{69}	—	—	—	—	63.4	0.40	31	37.7	89.0	—	MPC; JPL
2026 DC_{70}	—	—	—	—	42.4	0.01	1	42.0	42.9	—	MPC; JPL
2026 DC_{71}	—	—	—	—	136.8	0.74	24	34.9	238.6	—	MPC; JPL
2026 DC_{77}	—	—	—	—	43.0	0.10	29	38.7	47.3	—	MPC; JPL
2026 DD_{67}	—	—	—	—	48.6	0.26	14	36.1	61.1	—	MPC; JPL
2026 DD_{69}	—	—	—	—	44.3	0.12	11	39.0	49.5	—	MPC; JPL
2026 DD_{70}	—	—	—	—	45.6	0.07	2	42.2	49.0	—	MPC; JPL
2026 DD_{71}	—	—	—	—	34.7	0.06	5	32.6	36.8	—	MPC; JPL
2026 DE_{65}	—	—	—	—	54.6	0.34	8	36.0	73.3	—	MPC; JPL
2026 DE_{67}	—	—	—	—	71.2	0.53	18	33.4	108.9	—	MPC; JPL
2026 DE_{69}	—	—	—	—	36.5	0.13	7	31.9	41.1	—	MPC; JPL
2026 DE_{70}	—	—	—	—	43.1	0.02	2	42.4	43.8	—	MPC; JPL
2026 DE_{71}	—	—	—	—	42.8	0.06	4	40.4	45.2	—	MPC; JPL
2026 DF_{64}	—	—	—	—	57.5	0.41	9	34.2	80.8	—	MPC; JPL
2026 DF_{65}	—	—	—	—	61.9	0.37	16	39.0	84.8	—	MPC; JPL
2026 DF_{67}	—	—	—	—	48.1	0.10	19	43.2	53.0	—	MPC; JPL
2026 DF_{69}	—	—	—	—	42.6	0.17	4	35.5	49.7	—	MPC; JPL
2026 DF_{70}	—	—	—	—	48.0	0.13	3	41.7	54.3	—	MPC; JPL
2026 DF_{71}	—	—	—	—	43.6	0.15	3	37.1	50.1	—	MPC; JPL
2026 DG_{64}	—	—	—	—	57.7	0.26	1	42.8	72.6	—	MPC; JPL
2026 DG_{65}	—	—	—	—	45.3	0.13	2	39.4	51.2	—	MPC; JPL
2026 DG_{67}	—	—	—	—	43.2	0.12	10	38.0	48.4	—	MPC; JPL
2026 DG_{69}	—	—	—	—	60.2	0.38	18	37.1	83.2	—	MPC; JPL
2026 DG_{70}	—	—	—	—	44.0	0.05	20	41.9	46.0	—	MPC; JPL
2026 DG_{71}	—	—	—	—	39.5	0.29	23	28.0	50.9	—	MPC; JPL
2026 DH_{64}	—	—	—	—	50.7	0.50	21	25.5	75.9	—	MPC; JPL
2026 DH_{65}	—	—	—	—	43.7	0.04	10	41.8	45.6	—	MPC; JPL
2026 DH_{67}	—	—	—	—	47.4	0.11	15	42.2	52.5	—	MPC; JPL
2026 DH_{69}	—	—	—	—	43.9	0.14	4	37.6	50.1	—	MPC; JPL
2026 DH_{70}	—	—	—	—	45.8	0.18	34	37.4	54.1	—	MPC; JPL
2026 DH_{71}	—	—	—	—	38.5	0.08	23	35.5	41.6	—	MPC; JPL
2026 DJ_{64}	—	—	—	—	47.0	0.31	3	32.4	61.6	—	MPC; JPL
2026 DJ_{65}	—	—	—	—	44.3	0.09	4	40.4	48.3	—	MPC; JPL
2026 DJ_{69}	—	—	—	—	47.0	0.12	8	41.4	52.5	—	MPC; JPL
2026 DJ_{70}	—	—	—	—	41.7	0.14	45	35.7	47.7	—	MPC; JPL
2026 DJ_{71}	—	—	—	—	39.7	0.26	16	29.3	50.1	—	MPC; JPL
2026 DK_{64}	—	—	—	—	30.4	0.43	30	17.5	43.3	—	MPC; JPL
2026 DK_{67}	—	—	—	—	68.7	0.51	18	33.6	103.9	—	MPC; JPL
2026 DK_{69}	—	—	—	—	42.7	0.21	47	33.8	51.5	—	MPC; JPL
2026 DK_{70}	—	—	—	—	44.8	0.05	2	42.8	46.9	—	MPC; JPL
2026 DK_{71}	—	—	—	—	51.3	0.44	6	28.8	73.8	—	MPC; JPL
2026 DL_{64}	—	—	—	—	281.0	0.92	10	22.3	539.6	—	MPC; JPL
2026 DL_{65}	—	—	—	—	107.0	0.63	10	40.1	173.9	—	MPC; JPL
2026 DL_{67}	—	—	—	—	40.3	0.05	29	38.4	42.3	—	MPC; JPL
2026 DL_{69}	—	—	—	—	41.4	0.24	24	31.3	51.4	—	MPC; JPL
2026 DL_{70}	—	—	—	—	45.4	0.08	2	41.7	49.1	—	MPC; JPL
2026 DL_{71}	—	—	—	—	43.0	0.04	2	41.3	44.8	—	MPC; JPL
2026 DM_{64}	—	—	—	—	42.2	0.14	17	36.4	47.9	—	MPC; JPL
2026 DM_{67}	—	—	—	—	48.1	0.25	15	36.1	60.0	—	MPC; JPL
2026 DM_{69}	—	—	—	—	47.6	0.14	46	41.1	54.1	—	MPC; JPL
2026 DM_{70}	—	—	—	—	44.7	0.04	0	43.0	46.3	—	MPC; JPL
2026 DM_{71}	—	—	—	—	51.6	0.33	19	34.6	68.6	—	MPC; JPL
2026 DN_{64}	—	—	—	—	46.4	0.20	13	37.3	55.5	—	MPC; JPL
2026 DN_{67}	—	—	—	—	50.6	0.41	10	29.7	71.6	—	MPC; JPL
2026 DN_{69}	—	—	—	—	47.1	0.18	19	38.7	55.5	—	MPC; JPL
2026 DN_{70}	—	—	—	—	43.9	0.05	4	41.6	46.2	—	MPC; JPL
2026 DN_{71}	—	—	—	—	43.9	0.10	2	39.5	48.3	—	MPC; JPL
2026 DO_{67}	—	—	—	—	43.4	0.26	13	31.9	54.8	—	MPC; JPL
2026 DO_{69}	—	—	—	—	40.6	0.07	16	37.8	43.3	—	MPC; JPL
2026 DO_{70}	—	—	—	—	43.8	0.09	2	39.6	47.9	—	MPC; JPL
2026 DO_{71}	—	—	—	—	51.8	0.27	5	37.6	65.9	—	MPC; JPL
2026 DP_{64}	—	—	—	—	61.6	0.19	11	49.7	73.5	—	MPC; JPL
2026 DP_{67}	—	—	—	—	38.8	0.26	15	28.8	48.7	—	MPC; JPL
2026 DP_{69}	—	—	—	—	40.5	0.04	18	39.1	41.9	—	MPC; JPL
2026 DP_{70}	—	—	—	—	39.4	0.15	9	33.6	45.3	—	MPC; JPL
2026 DP_{71}	—	—	—	—	44.1	0.08	4	40.4	47.7	—	MPC; JPL
2026 DQ_{67}	—	—	—	—	46.2	0.21	12	36.5	56.0	—	MPC; JPL
2026 DQ_{69}	—	—	—	—	105.8	0.83	3	17.9	193.8	—	MPC; JPL
2026 DQ_{70}	—	—	—	—	43.9	0.06	6	41.2	46.6	—	MPC; JPL
2026 DQ_{71}	—	—	—	—	42.8	0.15	29	36.4	49.2	—	MPC; JPL
2026 DR_{64}	—	—	—	—	44.0	0.29	23	31.4	56.7	—	MPC; JPL
2026 DR_{67}	—	—	—	—	41.7	0.10	23	37.4	46.0	—	MPC; JPL
2026 DR_{69}	—	—	—	—	43.1	0.14	22	37.3	48.9	—	MPC; JPL
2026 DR_{70}	—	—	—	—	44.0	0.03	3	42.6	45.3	—	MPC; JPL
2026 DR_{71}	—	—	—	—	47.3	0.30	9	33.3	61.3	—	MPC; JPL
2026 DS_{67}	—	—	—	—	47.3	0.19	12	38.3	56.2	—	MPC; JPL
2026 DS_{69}	—	—	—	—	43.7	0.06	2	41.2	46.2	—	MPC; JPL
2026 DS_{70}	—	—	—	—	43.6	0.03	2	42.4	44.8	—	MPC; JPL
2026 DS_{71}	—	—	—	—	43.8	0.13	9	38.2	49.5	—	MPC; JPL
2026 DS_{78}	—	—	—	—	66.9	0.64	142	24.1	109.6	—	MPC; JPL
2026 DT_{64}	—	—	—	—	45.9	0.24	12	34.7	57.1	—	MPC; JPL
2026 DT_{67}	—	—	—	—	39.6	0.25	10	29.6	49.7	—	MPC; JPL
2026 DT_{69}	—	—	—	—	44.2	0.11	9	39.4	49.0	—	MPC; JPL
2026 DT_{70}	—	—	—	—	44.1	0.05	3	41.9	46.3	—	MPC; JPL
2026 DT_{71}	—	—	—	—	44.6	0.08	1	40.9	48.3	—	MPC; JPL
2026 DT_{78}	—	—	—	—	49.5	0.05	30	47.1	51.8	—	MPC; JPL
2026 DU_{64}	—	—	—	—	110.6	0.68	35	35.5	185.7	—	MPC; JPL
2026 DU_{69}	—	—	—	—	45.4	0.10	8	40.7	50.1	—	MPC; JPL
2026 DU_{70}	—	—	—	—	47.6	0.28	9	34.2	61.1	—	MPC; JPL
2026 DU_{71}	—	—	—	—	43.7	0.06	1	41.2	46.2	—	MPC; JPL
2026 DU_{78}	—	—	—	—	47.2	0.19	10	38.4	56.0	—	MPC; JPL
2026 DV_{64}	—	—	—	—	129.6	0.68	22	40.9	218.3	—	MPC; JPL
2026 DV_{69}	—	—	—	—	44.9	0.12	5	39.3	50.5	—	MPC; JPL
2026 DV_{70}	—	—	—	—	39.2	0.14	6	33.6	44.8	—	MPC; JPL
2026 DV_{71}	—	—	—	—	43.7	0.27	1	32.0	55.4	—	MPC; JPL
2026 DV_{78}	—	—	—	—	48.3	0.10	27	43.4	53.1	—	MPC; JPL
2026 DW_{64}	—	—	—	—	113.6	0.67	7	38.0	189.3	—	MPC; JPL
2026 DW_{69}	—	—	—	—	50.9	0.24	22	38.6	63.3	—	MPC; JPL
2026 DW_{70}	—	—	—	—	116.2	0.72	4	33.1	199.4	—	MPC; JPL
2026 DW_{71}	—	—	—	—	43.7	0.19	6	35.4	51.9	—	MPC; JPL
2026 DX_{64}	—	—	—	—	170.6	0.91	7	15.2	326.0	—	MPC; JPL
2026 DX_{69}	—	—	—	—	154.5	0.78	12	33.5	275.6	—	MPC; JPL
2026 DX_{70}	—	—	—	—	43.6	0.09	3	39.9	47.3	—	MPC; JPL
2026 DX_{71}	—	—	—	—	39.1	0.18	6	32.2	46.1	—	MPC; JPL
2026 DX_{76}	—	—	—	—	45.7	0.03	1	44.5	47.0	—	MPC; JPL
2026 DY_{69}	—	—	—	—	39.6	0.25	16	29.7	49.6	—	MPC; JPL
2026 DY_{70}	—	—	—	—	39.4	0.16	4	33.2	45.6	—	MPC; JPL
2026 DY_{71}	—	—	—	—	45.9	0.17	9	38.1	53.6	—	MPC; JPL
2026 DY_{76}	—	—	—	—	43.3	0.04	4	41.7	45.0	—	MPC; JPL
2026 DZ_{64}	—	—	—	—	68.3	0.53	12	32.4	104.1	—	MPC; JPL
2026 DZ_{69}	—	—	—	—	43.9	0.02	2	43.1	44.6	—	MPC; JPL
2026 DZ_{70}	—	—	—	—	42.7	0.05	4	40.7	44.6	—	MPC; JPL
2026 DZ_{71}	—	—	—	—	34.7	0.10	8	31.4	38.0	—	MPC; JPL
2026 DZ_{76}	—	—	—	—	48.1	0.15	12	40.9	55.4	—	MPC; JPL
2026 EA_{123}	—	—	—	—	40.2	0.15	16	34.3	46.1	—	MPC; JPL
2026 EA_{124}	—	—	—	—	400.5	0.91	26	36.1	764.9	—	MPC; JPL
2026 EA_{125}	—	—	—	—	39.8	0.10	7	35.9	43.8	—	MPC; JPL
2026 EA_{126}	—	—	—	—	39.6	0.08	5	36.6	42.6	—	MPC; JPL
2026 EA_{127}	—	—	—	—	67.0	0.32	1	45.6	88.4	—	MPC; JPL
2026 EA_{128}	—	—	—	—	133.4	0.70	1	40.2	226.7	—	MPC; JPL
2026 EA_{131}	—	—	—	—	45.5	0.18	15	37.3	53.8	—	MPC; JPL
2026 EA_{132}	—	—	—	—	46.9	0.44	6	26.4	67.3	—	MPC; JPL
2026 EA_{133}	—	—	—	—	40.8	0.13	13	35.4	46.2	—	MPC; JPL
2026 EA_{134}	—	—	—	—	258.1	0.90	3	25.5	490.7	—	MPC; JPL
2026 EA_{135}	—	—	—	—	43.2	0.09	7	39.2	47.1	—	MPC; JPL
2026 EA_{136}	—	—	—	—	72.8	0.52	1	35.2	110.4	—	MPC; JPL
2026 EA_{137}	—	—	—	—	45.2	0.09	8	41.1	49.4	—	MPC; JPL
2026 EA_{138}	—	—	—	—	40.9	0.08	24	37.7	44.1	—	MPC; JPL
2026 EA_{139}	—	—	—	—	43.7	0.17	17	36.3	51.2	—	MPC; JPL
2026 EA_{140}	—	—	—	—	43.8	0.20	11	35.3	52.4	—	MPC; JPL
2026 EA_{141}	—	—	—	—	75.5	0.35	31	49.3	101.8	—	MPC; JPL
2026 EA_{142}	—	—	—	—	45.7	0.07	3	42.4	49.0	—	MPC; JPL
2026 EA_{143}	—	—	—	—	42.6	0.08	3	39.4	45.8	—	MPC; JPL
2026 EA_{144}	—	—	—	—	39.2	0.20	4	31.5	46.9	—	MPC; JPL
2026 EA_{145}	—	—	—	—	39.7	0.22	8	30.9	48.5	—	MPC; JPL
2026 EA_{146}	—	—	—	—	45.2	0.09	8	41.0	49.5	—	MPC; JPL
2026 EA_{147}	—	—	—	—	44.5	0.06	8	41.9	47.0	—	MPC; JPL
2026 EA_{148}	—	—	—	—	45.5	0.16	10	38.3	52.8	—	MPC; JPL
2026 EB_{123}	—	—	—	—	73.5	0.49	20	37.6	109.5	—	MPC; JPL
2026 EB_{125}	—	—	—	—	41.2	0.16	19	34.8	47.6	—	MPC; JPL
2026 EB_{126}	—	—	—	—	105.6	0.64	24	37.5	173.8	—	MPC; JPL
2026 EB_{127}	—	—	—	—	70.0	0.44	13	39.5	100.5	—	MPC; JPL
2026 EB_{128}	—	—	—	—	136.8	0.71	21	39.0	234.5	—	MPC; JPL
2026 EB_{130}	—	—	—	—	2353.4	0.99	9	25.9	4680.9	—	MPC; JPL
2026 EB_{131}	—	—	—	—	96.3	0.62	26	37.0	155.7	—	MPC; JPL
2026 EB_{132}	—	—	—	—	41.7	0.10	31	37.7	45.8	—	MPC; JPL
2026 EB_{133}	—	—	—	—	44.8	0.30	3	31.5	58.2	—	MPC; JPL
2026 EB_{134}	—	—	—	—	44.3	0.04	3	42.4	46.1	—	MPC; JPL
2026 EB_{135}	—	—	—	—	43.1	0.03	1	41.7	44.5	—	MPC; JPL
2026 EB_{136}	—	—	—	—	51.6	0.42	15	29.8	73.5	—	MPC; JPL
2026 EB_{137}	—	—	—	—	44.4	0.17	41	36.8	52.0	—	MPC; JPL
2026 EB_{139}	—	—	—	—	40.9	0.08	14	37.8	44.0	—	MPC; JPL
2026 EB_{140}	—	—	—	—	62.6	0.43	19	35.4	89.9	—	MPC; JPL
2026 EB_{141}	—	—	—	—	43.8	0.21	22	34.5	53.2	—	MPC; JPL
2026 EB_{142}	—	—	—	—	43.2	0.08	3	39.9	46.6	—	MPC; JPL
2026 EB_{143}	—	—	—	—	61.1	0.40	15	36.6	85.5	—	MPC; JPL
2026 EB_{144}	—	—	—	—	46.6	0.09	8	42.6	50.5	—	MPC; JPL
2026 EB_{145}	—	—	—	—	43.8	0.19	22	35.5	52.0	—	MPC; JPL
2026 EB_{146}	—	—	—	—	39.1	0.17	11	32.3	45.9	—	MPC; JPL
2026 EB_{147}	—	—	—	—	43.1	0.07	9	40.2	46.0	—	MPC; JPL
2026 EB_{148}	—	—	—	—	107.3	0.65	24	37.4	177.3	—	MPC; JPL
2026 EC_{122}	—	—	—	—	41.8	0.02	13	40.8	42.8	—	MPC; JPL
2026 EC_{123}	—	—	—	—	60.8	0.40	23	36.6	85.0	—	MPC; JPL
2026 EC_{124}	—	—	—	—	41.2	0.05	30	39.3	43.1	—	MPC; JPL
2026 EC_{125}	—	—	—	—	42.0	0.21	30	33.2	50.7	—	MPC; JPL
2026 EC_{126}	—	—	—	—	74.1	0.47	3	39.5	108.8	—	MPC; JPL
2026 EC_{127}	—	—	—	—	61.1	0.69	5	19.1	103.0	—	MPC; JPL
2026 EC_{128}	—	—	—	—	138.8	0.69	6	43.5	234.1	—	MPC; JPL
2026 EC_{129}	—	—	—	—	47.6	0.33	8	31.9	63.2	—	MPC; JPL
2026 EC_{130}	—	—	—	—	133.8	0.76	20	31.7	235.8	—	MPC; JPL
2026 EC_{131}	—	—	—	—	55.8	0.34	9	36.7	74.8	—	MPC; JPL
2026 EC_{132}	—	—	—	—	42.2	0.20	4	33.8	50.5	—	MPC; JPL
2026 EC_{133}	—	—	—	—	67.3	0.52	10	32.4	102.2	—	MPC; JPL
2026 EC_{134}	—	—	—	—	45.0	0.08	4	41.2	48.8	—	MPC; JPL
2026 EC_{135}	—	—	—	—	44.5	0.18	5	36.6	52.3	—	MPC; JPL
2026 EC_{136}	—	—	—	—	102.8	0.68	29	32.8	172.8	—	MPC; JPL
2026 EC_{137}	—	—	—	—	65.2	0.42	23	38.0	92.4	—	MPC; JPL
2026 EC_{139}	—	—	—	—	63.1	0.35	20	41.1	85.0	—	MPC; JPL
2026 EC_{140}	—	—	—	—	93.7	0.64	31	33.9	153.5	—	MPC; JPL
2026 EC_{141}	—	—	—	—	43.8	0.13	3	38.1	49.5	—	MPC; JPL
2026 EC_{142}	—	—	—	—	43.0	0.05	2	40.7	45.2	—	MPC; JPL
2026 EC_{143}	—	—	—	—	47.6	0.11	13	42.5	52.7	—	MPC; JPL
2026 EC_{144}	—	—	—	—	43.8	0.06	3	41.1	46.5	—	MPC; JPL
2026 EC_{145}	—	—	—	—	45.3	0.05	7	43.0	47.7	—	MPC; JPL
2026 EC_{146}	—	—	—	—	38.2	0.25	8	28.8	47.6	—	MPC; JPL
2026 EC_{147}	—	—	—	—	54.5	0.36	16	34.7	74.3	—	MPC; JPL
2026 EC_{148}	—	—	—	—	43.6	0.26	16	32.1	55.1	—	MPC; JPL
2026 ED_{122}	—	—	—	—	46.1	0.05	27	43.7	48.5	—	MPC; JPL
2026 ED_{123}	—	—	—	—	46.3	0.25	6	34.6	58.1	—	MPC; JPL
2026 ED_{124}	—	—	—	—	42.8	0.13	21	37.3	48.2	—	MPC; JPL
2026 ED_{125}	—	—	—	—	61.4	0.37	19	38.9	83.9	—	MPC; JPL
2026 ED_{127}	—	—	—	—	92.4	0.59	0	37.8	146.9	—	MPC; JPL
2026 ED_{128}	—	—	—	—	116.6	0.64	1	42.2	191.0	—	MPC; JPL
2026 ED_{130}	—	—	—	—	42.5	0.24	29	32.4	52.6	—	MPC; JPL
2026 ED_{131}	—	—	—	—	39.5	0.05	8	37.6	41.4	—	MPC; JPL
2026 ED_{132}	—	—	—	—	46.0	0.14	9	39.6	52.3	—	MPC; JPL
2026 ED_{133}	—	—	—	—	46.3	0.20	13	36.8	55.8	—	MPC; JPL
2026 ED_{134}	—	—	—	—	44.3	0.15	5	37.7	50.9	—	MPC; JPL
2026 ED_{135}	—	—	—	—	46.7	0.03	11	45.2	48.3	—	MPC; JPL
2026 ED_{136}	—	—	—	—	59.9	0.42	18	34.9	84.9	—	MPC; JPL
2026 ED_{137}	—	—	—	—	42.3	0.05	9	40.1	44.5	—	MPC; JPL
2026 ED138	4 March 2026	Simonyi Survey Telescope, Rubin Observatory (X05)	—	—	42.9	0.14	25	36.9	49.0	—	MPC; JPL
2026 ED_{139}	—	—	—	—	45.0	0.11	19	40.1	49.8	—	MPC; JPL
2026 ED_{140}	—	—	—	—	45.4	0.19	27	36.7	54.2	—	MPC; JPL
2026 ED_{141}	—	—	—	—	36.6	0.15	9	31.0	42.2	—	MPC; JPL
2026 ED_{142}	—	—	—	—	45.5	0.12	2	40.1	51.0	—	MPC; JPL
2026 ED_{143}	—	—	—	—	41.3	0.04	27	39.5	43.1	—	MPC; JPL
2026 ED_{144}	—	—	—	—	44.3	0.05	4	41.9	46.6	—	MPC; JPL
2026 ED_{145}	—	—	—	—	68.5	0.46	8	37.1	99.9	—	MPC; JPL
2026 ED_{146}	—	—	—	—	45.5	0.03	6	44.2	46.8	—	MPC; JPL
2026 ED_{147}	—	—	—	—	44.3	0.43	9	25.3	63.2	—	MPC; JPL
2026 ED_{148}	—	—	—	—	43.7	0.20	10	35.1	52.3	—	MPC; JPL
2026 EE_{122}	—	—	—	—	42.5	0.15	31	36.3	48.7	—	MPC; JPL
2026 EE_{123}	—	—	—	—	54.5	0.31	23	37.5	71.5	—	MPC; JPL
2026 EE_{124}	—	—	—	—	37.6	0.10	5	33.7	41.4	—	MPC; JPL
2026 EE_{126}	—	—	—	—	79.7	0.57	36	34.2	125.3	—	MPC; JPL
2026 EE_{127}	—	—	—	—	98.7	0.75	13	24.6	172.7	—	MPC; JPL
2026 EE_{128}	—	—	—	—	110.0	0.70	9	33.0	186.9	—	MPC; JPL
2026 EE_{129}	—	—	—	—	43.2	0.12	16	38.0	48.4	—	MPC; JPL
2026 EE_{130}	—	—	—	—	36.5	0.07	11	34.1	39.0	—	MPC; JPL
2026 EE_{131}	—	—	—	—	51.2	0.25	27	38.6	63.8	—	MPC; JPL
2026 EE_{132}	—	—	—	—	50.7	0.24	9	38.6	62.8	—	MPC; JPL
2026 EE_{133}	—	—	—	—	40.2	0.04	20	38.5	41.9	—	MPC; JPL
2026 EE_{134}	—	—	—	—	43.7	0.22	4	34.0	53.5	—	MPC; JPL
2026 EE_{135}	—	—	—	—	51.9	0.18	21	42.4	61.4	—	MPC; JPL
2026 EE_{136}	—	—	—	—	37.9	0.11	28	33.6	42.2	—	MPC; JPL
2026 EE_{137}	—	—	—	—	43.2	0.04	4	41.6	44.8	—	MPC; JPL
2026 EE_{138}	9 March 2026	Simonyi Survey Telescope, Rubin Observatory (X05)	—	—	71.1	0.51	11	34.7	107.5	—	MPC; JPL
2026 EE_{139}	—	—	—	—	34.8	0.08	4	32.2	37.5	—	MPC; JPL
2026 EE_{140}	—	—	—	—	45.2	0.26	30	33.6	56.9	—	MPC; JPL
2026 EE_{141}	—	—	—	—	107.0	0.60	26	42.7	171.3	—	MPC; JPL
2026 EE_{142}	—	—	—	—	46.9	0.23	12	36.2	57.6	—	MPC; JPL
2026 EE_{143}	—	—	—	—	79.3	0.54	17	36.6	122.0	—	MPC; JPL
2026 EE_{144}	—	—	—	—	47.0	0.19	5	38.2	55.8	—	MPC; JPL
2026 EE_{145}	—	—	—	—	47.1	0.25	7	35.6	58.7	—	MPC; JPL
2026 EE_{146}	—	—	—	—	43.8	0.06	4	41.2	46.5	—	MPC; JPL
2026 EE_{147}	—	—	—	—	111.7	0.69	12	35.2	188.3	—	MPC; JPL
2026 EE_{148}	—	—	—	—	82.5	0.64	7	29.5	135.5	—	MPC; JPL
2026 EF_{122}	—	—	—	—	42.5	0.07	20	39.5	45.6	—	MPC; JPL
2026 EF_{123}	—	—	—	—	76.8	0.52	5	37.0	116.5	—	MPC; JPL
2026 EF_{124}	—	—	—	—	51.6	0.26	11	38.1	65.1	—	MPC; JPL
2026 EF_{125}	—	—	—	—	83.6	0.62	14	32.1	135.0	—	MPC; JPL
2026 EF_{126}	—	—	—	—	57.5	0.31	25	39.9	75.1	—	MPC; JPL
2026 EF_{127}	—	—	—	—	78.9	0.60	11	31.6	126.2	—	MPC; JPL
2026 EF_{128}	—	—	—	—	111.0	0.69	2	34.9	187.1	—	MPC; JPL
2026 EF_{129}	—	—	—	—	85.0	0.54	26	39.4	130.7	—	MPC; JPL
2026 EF_{130}	—	—	—	—	37.5	0.10	7	33.8	41.2	—	MPC; JPL
2026 EF_{131}	—	—	—	—	38.9	0.02	22	38.1	39.7	—	MPC; JPL
2026 EF_{132}	—	—	—	—	43.9	0.14	8	37.7	50.1	—	MPC; JPL
2026 EF_{133}	—	—	—	—	42.8	0.17	4	35.4	50.3	—	MPC; JPL
2026 EF_{134}	—	—	—	—	42.6	0.01	2	42.1	43.0	—	MPC; JPL
2026 EF_{135}	—	—	—	—	46.1	0.11	1	40.8	51.4	—	MPC; JPL
2026 EF_{137}	—	—	—	—	44.7	0.01	11	44.1	45.2	—	MPC; JPL
2026 EF_{138}	—	—	—	—	62.2	0.63	0	23.2	101.1	—	MPC; JPL
2026 EF_{139}	—	—	—	—	98.0	0.74	2	25.8	170.2	—	MPC; JPL
2026 EF_{140}	—	—	—	—	66.0	0.53	25	31.2	100.9	—	MPC; JPL
2026 EF_{141}	—	—	—	—	37.8	0.00	2	37.7	38.0	—	MPC; JPL
2026 EF_{142}	—	—	—	—	88.8	0.61	6	34.2	143.4	—	MPC; JPL
2026 EF_{143}	—	—	—	—	54.0	0.36	22	34.3	73.7	—	MPC; JPL
2026 EF_{144}	—	—	—	—	43.8	0.07	2	40.8	46.9	—	MPC; JPL
2026 EF_{145}	—	—	—	—	39.3	0.27	9	28.5	50.1	—	MPC; JPL
2026 EF_{146}	—	—	—	—	39.2	0.24	9	29.8	48.5	—	MPC; JPL
2026 EF_{147}	—	—	—	—	55.4	0.43	15	31.8	79.1	—	MPC; JPL
2026 EF_{148}	—	—	—	—	51.3	0.35	26	33.3	69.3	—	MPC; JPL
2026 EG_{122}	—	—	—	—	46.8	0.25	28	34.9	58.7	—	MPC; JPL
2026 EG_{123}	—	—	—	—	49.6	0.23	20	38.1	61.1	—	MPC; JPL
2026 EG_{124}	—	—	—	—	42.8	0.13	17	37.3	48.3	—	MPC; JPL
2026 EG_{125}	—	—	—	—	68.8	0.40	27	41.2	96.4	—	MPC; JPL
2026 EG_{126}	—	—	—	—	87.6	0.53	2	41.0	134.3	—	MPC; JPL
2026 EG_{127}	—	—	—	—	623.1	0.95	28	29.3	1216.9	—	MPC; JPL
2026 EG_{128}	—	—	—	—	102.9	0.58	19	43.1	162.6	—	MPC; JPL
2026 EG_{129}	—	—	—	—	55.8	0.39	11	34.2	77.4	—	MPC; JPL
2026 EG_{130}	—	—	—	—	42.1	0.19	30	34.1	50.1	—	MPC; JPL
2026 EG_{131}	—	—	—	—	38.0	0.03	23	36.8	39.3	—	MPC; JPL
2026 EG_{132}	—	—	—	—	42.7	0.07	4	39.7	45.7	—	MPC; JPL
2026 EG_{133}	—	—	—	—	82.7	0.55	32	37.3	128.1	—	MPC; JPL
2026 EG_{134}	—	—	—	—	35.9	0.41	37	21.2	50.7	—	MPC; JPL
2026 EG_{135}	—	—	—	—	42.3	0.14	28	36.4	48.1	—	MPC; JPL
2026 EG_{136}	—	—	—	—	32.8	0.09	15	29.7	35.9	—	MPC; JPL
2026 EG_{137}	—	—	—	—	46.3	0.13	3	40.2	52.4	—	MPC; JPL
2026 EG_{138}	—	—	—	—	42.7	0.15	19	36.4	48.9	—	MPC; JPL
2026 EG_{139}	—	—	—	—	39.6	0.52	4	19.1	60.1	—	MPC; JPL
2026 EG_{140}	—	—	—	—	40.6	0.09	22	37.0	44.2	—	MPC; JPL
2026 EG_{141}	—	—	—	—	46.6	0.29	29	32.9	60.3	—	MPC; JPL
2026 EG_{142}	—	—	—	—	43.0	0.10	6	38.8	47.3	—	MPC; JPL
2026 EG_{143}	—	—	—	—	44.5	0.16	9	37.3	51.8	—	MPC; JPL
2026 EG_{144}	—	—	—	—	41.9	0.10	9	37.8	46.0	—	MPC; JPL
2026 EG_{145}	—	—	—	—	39.4	0.25	12	29.4	49.5	—	MPC; JPL
2026 EG_{146}	—	—	—	—	55.7	0.43	5	31.6	79.7	—	MPC; JPL
2026 EG_{147}	—	—	—	—	39.3	0.26	9	28.9	49.6	—	MPC; JPL
2026 EG_{148}	—	—	—	—	47.9	0.25	6	36.0	59.8	—	MPC; JPL
2026 EH_{122}	—	—	—	—	76.9	0.55	18	34.9	118.9	—	MPC; JPL
2026 EH_{123}	—	—	—	—	44.3	0.10	24	39.9	48.7	—	MPC; JPL
2026 EH_{124}	—	—	—	—	82.0	0.63	10	30.2	133.8	—	MPC; JPL
2026 EH_{125}	—	—	—	—	80.3	0.48	27	41.5	119.0	—	MPC; JPL
2026 EH_{126}	—	—	—	—	47.1	0.30	10	33.1	61.0	—	MPC; JPL
2026 EH_{127}	—	—	—	—	62.2	0.33	2	41.4	83.1	—	MPC; JPL
2026 EH_{128}	—	—	—	—	131.1	0.68	3	41.5	220.7	—	MPC; JPL
2026 EH_{129}	—	—	—	—	55.5	0.40	15	33.4	77.6	—	MPC; JPL
2026 EH_{130}	—	—	—	—	48.1	0.31	21	33.4	62.8	—	MPC; JPL
2026 EH_{131}	—	—	—	—	53.9	0.29	6	38.6	69.3	—	MPC; JPL
2026 EH_{132}	—	—	—	—	40.6	0.02	19	39.9	41.3	—	MPC; JPL
2026 EH_{133}	—	—	—	—	43.6	0.06	8	41.1	46.2	—	MPC; JPL
2026 EH_{134}	—	—	—	—	46.2	0.29	3	32.6	59.7	—	MPC; JPL
2026 EH_{135}	—	—	—	—	42.3	0.22	29	32.9	51.7	—	MPC; JPL
2026 EH_{136}	—	—	—	—	42.1	0.15	14	35.6	48.5	—	MPC; JPL
2026 EH_{137}	—	—	—	—	61.6	0.28	26	44.0	79.1	—	MPC; JPL
2026 EH_{138}	—	—	—	—	46.9	0.24	3	35.8	58.0	—	MPC; JPL
2026 EH_{139}	—	—	—	—	65.0	0.71	12	18.6	111.5	—	MPC; JPL
2026 EH_{140}	—	—	—	—	42.7	0.25	5	32.1	53.3	—	MPC; JPL
2026 EH_{141}	—	—	—	—	62.3	0.41	39	36.5	88.0	—	MPC; JPL
2026 EH_{142}	—	—	—	—	45.5	0.09	5	41.4	49.6	—	MPC; JPL
2026 EH_{143}	—	—	—	—	220.4	0.85	19	34.1	406.7	—	MPC; JPL
2026 EH_{144}	—	—	—	—	43.9	0.03	5	42.5	45.3	—	MPC; JPL
2026 EH_{145}	—	—	—	—	43.8	0.04	12	42.2	45.4	—	MPC; JPL
2026 EH_{146}	—	—	—	—	39.4	0.18	5	32.2	46.6	—	MPC; JPL
2026 EH_{147}	—	—	—	—	55.4	0.40	9	33.1	77.8	—	MPC; JPL
2026 EH_{148}	—	—	—	—	45.8	0.13	5	39.9	51.7	—	MPC; JPL
2026 EJ_{122}	—	—	—	—	39.9	0.11	20	35.5	44.3	—	MPC; JPL
2026 EJ_{123}	—	—	—	—	36.1	0.18	21	29.6	42.6	—	MPC; JPL
2026 EJ_{124}	—	—	—	—	47.9	0.43	16	27.4	68.4	—	MPC; JPL
2026 EJ_{125}	—	—	—	—	47.5	0.29	13	33.9	61.1	—	MPC; JPL
2026 EJ_{126}	—	—	—	—	39.3	0.10	2	35.3	43.2	—	MPC; JPL
2026 EJ_{127}	—	—	—	—	56.3	0.30	2	39.4	73.3	—	MPC; JPL
2026 EJ_{128}	—	—	—	—	108.0	0.62	1	41.1	175.0	—	MPC; JPL
2026 EJ_{129}	—	—	—	—	97.4	0.74	6	25.2	169.6	—	MPC; JPL
2026 EJ_{130}	—	—	—	—	48.3	0.27	5	35.0	61.5	—	MPC; JPL
2026 EJ_{131}	—	—	—	—	43.2	0.13	10	37.8	48.7	—	MPC; JPL
2026 EJ_{132}	—	—	—	—	45.5	0.32	7	30.7	60.3	—	MPC; JPL
2026 EJ_{133}	—	—	—	—	46.8	0.23	4	36.1	57.6	—	MPC; JPL
2026 EJ_{134}	—	—	—	—	42.8	0.02	3	41.9	43.6	—	MPC; JPL
2026 EJ_{135}	—	—	—	—	50.3	0.32	2	34.0	66.6	—	MPC; JPL
2026 EJ_{136}	—	—	—	—	54.7	0.37	19	34.5	74.9	—	MPC; JPL
2026 EJ_{137}	—	—	—	—	51.8	0.17	9	43.1	60.4	—	MPC; JPL
2026 EJ_{138}	—	—	—	—	85.4	0.55	15	38.5	132.3	—	MPC; JPL
2026 EJ_{139}	—	—	—	—	48.1	0.24	6	36.6	59.6	—	MPC; JPL
2026 EJ_{140}	—	—	—	—	42.5	0.19	4	34.6	50.4	—	MPC; JPL
2026 EJ_{141}	—	—	—	—	125.9	0.72	22	34.8	216.9	—	MPC; JPL
2026 EJ_{142}	—	—	—	—	44.5	0.08	5	40.7	48.2	—	MPC; JPL
2026 EJ_{143}	—	—	—	—	42.8	0.09	13	39.1	46.5	—	MPC; JPL
2026 EJ_{144}	—	—	—	—	231.7	0.82	7	41.7	421.8	—	MPC; JPL
2026 EJ_{145}	—	—	—	—	43.6	0.12	9	38.4	48.8	—	MPC; JPL
2026 EJ_{146}	—	—	—	—	45.1	0.08	6	41.5	48.8	—	MPC; JPL
2026 EJ_{147}	—	—	—	—	94.3	0.60	15	37.6	151.1	—	MPC; JPL
2026 EJ_{148}	—	—	—	—	43.3	0.02	3	42.3	44.4	—	MPC; JPL
2026 EK_{122}	—	—	—	—	54.1	0.35	28	35.0	73.1	—	MPC; JPL
2026 EK_{123}	—	—	—	—	42.5	0.10	10	38.1	46.8	—	MPC; JPL
2026 EK_{124}	—	—	—	—	56.4	0.51	32	27.9	84.9	—	MPC; JPL
2026 EK_{125}	—	—	—	—	79.9	0.25	14	60.1	99.7	—	MPC; JPL
2026 EK_{126}	—	—	—	—	61.8	0.65	17	21.6	102.1	—	MPC; JPL
2026 EK_{127}	—	—	—	—	44.2	0.19	36	35.8	52.5	—	MPC; JPL
2026 EK_{128}	—	—	—	—	50.8	0.25	14	38.3	63.3	—	MPC; JPL
2026 EK_{129}	—	—	—	—	47.6	0.10	3	42.8	52.4	—	MPC; JPL
2026 EK_{130}	—	—	—	—	47.8	0.26	13	35.6	60.0	—	MPC; JPL
2026 EK_{131}	—	—	—	—	47.6	0.40	14	28.4	66.9	—	MPC; JPL
2026 EK_{132}	—	—	—	—	45.6	0.12	16	39.9	51.2	—	MPC; JPL
2026 EK_{133}	—	—	—	—	34.3	0.24	21	26.2	42.3	—	MPC; JPL
2026 EK_{134}	—	—	—	—	55.3	0.36	36	35.2	75.4	—	MPC; JPL
2026 EK_{135}	—	—	—	—	72.1	0.43	29	40.9	103.2	—	MPC; JPL
2026 EK_{136}	—	—	—	—	46.4	0.21	22	36.6	56.3	—	MPC; JPL
2026 EK_{137}	—	—	—	—	75.6	0.54	25	35.1	116.2	—	MPC; JPL
2026 EK_{138}	—	—	—	—	73.1	0.47	23	38.4	107.9	—	MPC; JPL
2026 EK_{139}	—	—	—	—	67.7	0.44	10	38.0	97.4	—	MPC; JPL
2026 EK_{140}	—	—	—	—	41.7	0.09	24	38.0	45.3	—	MPC; JPL
2026 EK_{141}	—	—	—	—	39.3	0.19	14	31.6	47.0	—	MPC; JPL
2026 EK_{142}	—	—	—	—	45.6	0.19	6	37.0	54.3	—	MPC; JPL
2026 EK_{143}	—	—	—	—	100.3	0.71	15	29.1	171.4	—	MPC; JPL
2026 EK_{144}	—	—	—	—	39.4	0.28	19	28.3	50.5	—	MPC; JPL
2026 EK_{145}	—	—	—	—	61.1	0.25	20	45.6	76.6	—	MPC; JPL
2026 EK_{146}	—	—	—	—	39.2	0.27	8	28.6	49.8	—	MPC; JPL
2026 EK_{147}	—	—	—	—	59.8	0.43	10	34.3	85.3	—	MPC; JPL
2026 EK_{148}	—	—	—	—	43.9	0.10	2	39.7	48.1	—	MPC; JPL
2026 EL_{122}	—	—	—	—	46.5	0.16	27	38.9	54.1	—	MPC; JPL
2026 EL_{123}	—	—	—	—	58.6	0.39	17	35.7	81.4	—	MPC; JPL
2026 EL_{124}	—	—	—	—	43.0	0.07	27	40.2	45.9	—	MPC; JPL
2026 EL_{125}	—	—	—	—	46.4	0.30	26	32.5	60.2	—	MPC; JPL
2026 EL_{126}	—	—	—	—	74.6	0.48	27	38.7	110.4	—	MPC; JPL
2026 EL_{127}	—	—	—	—	32.8	0.10	9	29.5	36.1	—	MPC; JPL
2026 EL_{128}	—	—	—	—	42.8	0.11	32	38.1	47.5	—	MPC; JPL
2026 EL_{129}	—	—	—	—	46.5	0.37	8	29.5	63.5	—	MPC; JPL
2026 EL_{130}	—	—	—	—	50.6	0.31	18	35.1	66.1	—	MPC; JPL
2026 EL_{131}	—	—	—	—	44.2	0.13	3	38.7	49.7	—	MPC; JPL
2026 EL_{132}	—	—	—	—	44.2	0.25	6	33.2	55.2	—	MPC; JPL
2026 EL_{133}	—	—	—	—	53.5	0.28	36	38.7	68.2	—	MPC; JPL
2026 EL_{134}	—	—	—	—	44.0	0.05	2	41.8	46.3	—	MPC; JPL
2026 EL_{135}	—	—	—	—	43.9	0.08	1	40.2	47.6	—	MPC; JPL
2026 EL_{136}	—	—	—	—	36.6	0.18	10	29.9	43.4	—	MPC; JPL
2026 EL_{137}	—	—	—	—	46.2	0.11	15	41.3	51.0	—	MPC; JPL
2026 EL_{140}	—	—	—	—	82.1	0.56	9	35.9	128.4	—	MPC; JPL
2026 EL_{141}	—	—	—	—	44.0	0.17	19	36.3	51.7	—	MPC; JPL
2026 EL_{142}	—	—	—	—	55.5	0.21	34	44.0	67.0	—	MPC; JPL
2026 EL_{143}	—	—	—	—	39.6	0.18	29	32.6	46.7	—	MPC; JPL
2026 EL_{144}	—	—	—	—	44.7	0.06	4	42.2	47.3	—	MPC; JPL
2026 EL_{145}	—	—	—	—	47.6	0.26	13	35.3	59.9	—	MPC; JPL
2026 EL_{146}	—	—	—	—	39.4	0.28	18	28.6	50.3	—	MPC; JPL
2026 EL_{147}	—	—	—	—	43.4	0.09	13	39.4	47.5	—	MPC; JPL
2026 EL_{148}	—	—	—	—	43.6	0.18	1	36.0	51.3	—	MPC; JPL
2026 EM_{122}	—	—	—	—	44.6	0.14	27	38.5	50.6	—	MPC; JPL
2026 EM_{123}	—	—	—	—	40.2	0.10	1	36.2	44.2	—	MPC; JPL
2026 EM_{124}	—	—	—	—	121.5	0.70	27	36.8	206.1	—	MPC; JPL
2026 EM_{125}	—	—	—	—	254.6	0.94	10	16.4	492.8	—	MPC; JPL
2026 EM_{126}	—	—	—	—	41.9	0.61	29	16.5	67.3	—	MPC; JPL
2026 EM_{127}	—	—	—	—	65.6	0.26	16	48.9	82.4	—	MPC; JPL
2026 EM_{128}	—	—	—	—	45.0	0.11	18	39.9	50.0	—	MPC; JPL
2026 EM_{129}	—	—	—	—	59.1	0.34	14	39.2	78.9	—	MPC; JPL
2026 EM_{130}	—	—	—	—	39.6	0.12	23	34.7	44.4	—	MPC; JPL
2026 EM_{131}	—	—	—	—	45.9	0.16	20	38.4	53.4	—	MPC; JPL
2026 EM_{132}	—	—	—	—	47.1	0.15	2	40.0	54.2	—	MPC; JPL
2026 EM_{133}	—	—	—	—	39.6	0.10	6	35.8	43.4	—	MPC; JPL
2026 EM_{134}	—	—	—	—	43.5	0.05	3	41.4	45.5	—	MPC; JPL
2026 EM_{135}	—	—	—	—	86.0	0.74	10	22.6	149.5	—	MPC; JPL
2026 EM_{136}	—	—	—	—	41.0	0.21	21	32.5	49.6	—	MPC; JPL
2026 EM_{137}	—	—	—	—	44.4	0.08	3	41.0	47.9	—	MPC; JPL
2026 EM_{138}	—	—	—	—	34.3	0.30	20	24.0	44.5	—	MPC; JPL
2026 EM_{139}	—	—	—	—	47.5	0.24	29	36.3	58.7	—	MPC; JPL
2026 EM_{140}	—	—	—	—	45.4	0.08	28	41.9	48.9	—	MPC; JPL
2026 EM_{141}	—	—	—	—	43.6	0.07	10	40.4	46.7	—	MPC; JPL
2026 EM_{142}	—	—	—	—	43.7	0.05	9	41.4	45.9	—	MPC; JPL
2026 EM_{143}	—	—	—	—	44.9	0.18	20	36.8	53.0	—	MPC; JPL
2026 EM_{144}	—	—	—	—	40.6	0.06	17	38.3	43.0	—	MPC; JPL
2026 EM_{145}	—	—	—	—	47.4	0.18	7	39.0	55.7	—	MPC; JPL
2026 EM_{146}	—	—	—	—	45.7	0.19	16	37.1	54.3	—	MPC; JPL
2026 EM_{147}	—	—	—	—	39.3	0.33	23	26.4	52.2	—	MPC; JPL
2026 EM_{148}	—	—	—	—	44.2	0.04	2	42.5	45.9	—	MPC; JPL
2026 EN_{122}	—	—	—	—	45.2	0.20	9	36.2	54.2	—	MPC; JPL
2026 EN_{123}	—	—	—	—	41.7	0.04	32	40.1	43.4	—	MPC; JPL
2026 EN_{124}	—	—	—	—	43.5	0.29	11	31.0	56.0	—	MPC; JPL
2026 EN_{125}	—	—	—	—	76.8	0.64	26	27.3	126.2	—	MPC; JPL
2026 EN_{126}	—	—	—	—	42.1	0.15	29	35.7	48.6	—	MPC; JPL
2026 EN_{127}	—	—	—	—	55.2	0.52	2	26.8	83.7	—	MPC; JPL
2026 EN_{128}	—	—	—	—	47.0	0.22	7	36.5	57.5	—	MPC; JPL
2026 EN_{129}	—	—	—	—	36.3	0.10	20	32.7	39.9	—	MPC; JPL
2026 EN_{130}	—	—	—	—	54.1	0.32	31	36.7	71.6	—	MPC; JPL
2026 EN_{131}	—	—	—	—	44.1	0.16	15	37.2	51.0	—	MPC; JPL
2026 EN_{132}	—	—	—	—	46.3	0.13	28	40.0	52.5	—	MPC; JPL
2026 EN_{133}	—	—	—	—	46.0	0.27	18	33.7	58.2	—	MPC; JPL
2026 EN_{134}	—	—	—	—	43.0	0.01	2	42.6	43.5	—	MPC; JPL
2026 EN_{135}	—	—	—	—	52.9	0.23	15	40.8	64.9	—	MPC; JPL
2026 EN_{136}	—	—	—	—	38.7	0.03	29	37.4	40.0	—	MPC; JPL
2026 EN_{137}	—	—	—	—	44.8	0.05	3	42.5	47.1	—	MPC; JPL
2026 EN_{138}	—	—	—	—	39.6	0.11	15	35.4	43.9	—	MPC; JPL
2026 EN_{139}	—	—	—	—	43.9	0.09	9	40.1	47.8	—	MPC; JPL
2026 EN_{140}	—	—	—	—	50.0	0.23	21	38.3	61.7	—	MPC; JPL
2026 EN_{141}	—	—	—	—	42.9	0.03	4	41.4	44.4	—	MPC; JPL
2026 EN_{142}	—	—	—	—	53.1	0.34	6	35.2	71.0	—	MPC; JPL
2026 EN_{143}	—	—	—	—	39.4	0.25	12	29.5	49.2	—	MPC; JPL
2026 EN_{144}	—	—	—	—	39.4	0.28	11	28.5	50.3	—	MPC; JPL
2026 EN_{145}	—	—	—	—	39.2	0.23	6	30.1	48.2	—	MPC; JPL
2026 EN_{146}	—	—	—	—	39.2	0.23	16	30.2	48.1	—	MPC; JPL
2026 EN_{147}	—	—	—	—	46.0	0.20	19	36.8	55.1	—	MPC; JPL
2026 EN_{148}	—	—	—	—	43.3	0.09	24	39.5	47.1	—	MPC; JPL
2026 EO_{122}	—	—	—	—	119.0	0.81	45	22.4	215.6	—	MPC; JPL
2026 EO_{123}	—	—	—	—	53.6	0.37	12	33.9	73.3	—	MPC; JPL
2026 EO_{124}	—	—	—	—	43.2	0.18	31	35.5	50.9	—	MPC; JPL
2026 EO_{125}	—	—	—	—	289.2	0.88	17	34.0	544.4	—	MPC; JPL
2026 EO_{127}	—	—	—	—	68.2	0.66	15	23.5	112.9	—	MPC; JPL
2026 EO_{128}	—	—	—	—	75.2	0.47	19	40.2	110.3	—	MPC; JPL
2026 EO_{129}	—	—	—	—	48.6	0.14	14	41.8	55.5	—	MPC; JPL
2026 EO_{130}	—	—	—	—	40.8	0.12	29	35.8	45.8	—	MPC; JPL
2026 EO_{131}	—	—	—	—	45.3	0.15	2	38.5	52.1	—	MPC; JPL
2026 EO_{132}	—	—	—	—	59.7	0.38	23	36.9	82.5	—	MPC; JPL
2026 EO_{133}	—	—	—	—	46.1	0.35	29	30.1	62.0	—	MPC; JPL
2026 EO_{134}	—	—	—	—	47.9	0.11	21	42.8	53.1	—	MPC; JPL
2026 EO_{135}	—	—	—	—	47.9	0.09	26	43.5	52.4	—	MPC; JPL
2026 EO_{136}	—	—	—	—	47.2	0.20	10	37.7	56.7	—	MPC; JPL
2026 EO_{137}	—	—	—	—	44.7	0.21	15	35.4	54.0	—	MPC; JPL
2026 EO_{138}	—	—	—	—	44.1	0.14	17	38.0	50.2	—	MPC; JPL
2026 EO_{139}	—	—	—	—	119.4	0.65	34	41.3	197.5	—	MPC; JPL
2026 EO_{140}	—	—	—	—	41.3	0.10	23	37.1	45.5	—	MPC; JPL
2026 EO_{141}	—	—	—	—	39.3	0.23	5	30.3	48.3	—	MPC; JPL
2026 EO_{142}	—	—	—	—	38.7	0.23	5	29.8	47.5	—	MPC; JPL
2026 EO_{143}	—	—	—	—	43.7	0.06	5	40.9	46.5	—	MPC; JPL
2026 EO_{144}	—	—	—	—	41.8	0.07	17	38.9	44.7	—	MPC; JPL
2026 EO_{145}	—	—	—	—	39.5	0.20	10	31.5	47.5	—	MPC; JPL
2026 EO_{146}	—	—	—	—	124.9	0.70	21	38.1	211.7	—	MPC; JPL
2026 EO_{147}	—	—	—	—	55.3	0.34	18	36.5	74.1	—	MPC; JPL
2026 EO_{148}	—	—	—	—	149.9	0.75	4	37.8	261.9	—	MPC; JPL
2026 EP_{122}	—	—	—	—	46.1	0.25	18	34.6	57.6	—	MPC; JPL
2026 EP_{124}	—	—	—	—	46.3	0.14	10	40.0	52.7	—	MPC; JPL
2026 EP_{125}	—	—	—	—	53.4	0.44	15	30.2	76.6	—	MPC; JPL
2026 EP_{126}	—	—	—	—	45.5	0.15	29	38.5	52.5	—	MPC; JPL
2026 EP_{127}	—	—	—	—	47.8	0.30	26	33.4	62.2	—	MPC; JPL
2026 EP_{128}	—	—	—	—	87.5	0.71	16	25.0	149.9	—	MPC; JPL
2026 EP_{129}	—	—	—	—	48.4	0.10	5	43.5	53.3	—	MPC; JPL
2026 EP_{130}	—	—	—	—	38.7	0.05	45	36.9	40.6	—	MPC; JPL
2026 EP_{131}	—	—	—	—	47.1	0.19	8	38.1	56.1	—	MPC; JPL
2026 EP_{132}	—	—	—	—	44.3	0.15	12	37.8	50.8	—	MPC; JPL
2026 EP_{133}	—	—	—	—	60.8	0.41	7	35.7	86.0	—	MPC; JPL
2026 EP_{134}	—	—	—	—	41.9	0.11	9	37.5	46.3	—	MPC; JPL
2026 EP_{136}	—	—	—	—	41.8	0.09	21	38.2	45.3	—	MPC; JPL
2026 EP_{137}	—	—	—	—	44.6	0.11	3	39.5	49.7	—	MPC; JPL
2026 EP_{138}	—	—	—	—	44.9	0.34	27	29.7	60.0	—	MPC; JPL
2026 EP_{139}	—	—	—	—	43.1	0.03	4	41.7	44.5	—	MPC; JPL
2026 EP_{140}	—	—	—	—	49.9	0.24	20	38.1	61.6	—	MPC; JPL
2026 EP_{141}	—	—	—	—	46.8	0.03	12	45.5	48.0	—	MPC; JPL
2026 EP_{142}	—	—	—	—	358.8	0.88	11	41.6	676.1	—	MPC; JPL
2026 EP_{143}	—	—	—	—	44.2	0.09	3	40.1	48.3	—	MPC; JPL
2026 EP_{144}	—	—	—	—	42.7	0.14	17	36.8	48.5	—	MPC; JPL
2026 EP_{145}	—	—	—	—	39.3	0.27	26	28.8	49.7	—	MPC; JPL
2026 EP_{146}	—	—	—	—	40.7	0.09	30	37.1	44.2	—	MPC; JPL
2026 EP_{148}	—	—	—	—	39.5	0.02	16	38.8	40.3	—	MPC; JPL
2026 EQ_{122}	—	—	—	—	46.6	0.16	16	39.1	54.1	—	MPC; JPL
2026 EQ_{123}	—	—	—	—	69.5	0.44	11	38.7	100.3	—	MPC; JPL
2026 EQ_{124}	—	—	—	—	45.5	0.29	7	32.1	58.8	—	MPC; JPL
2026 EQ_{125}	—	—	—	—	47.7	0.13	23	41.5	53.8	—	MPC; JPL
2026 EQ_{126}	—	—	—	—	48.4	0.22	28	37.9	59.0	—	MPC; JPL
2026 EQ_{127}	—	—	—	—	38.9	0.02	33	38.2	39.6	—	MPC; JPL
2026 EQ_{128}	—	—	—	—	59.9	0.51	19	29.2	90.5	—	MPC; JPL
2026 EQ_{129}	—	—	—	—	48.5	0.26	17	36.0	61.1	—	MPC; JPL
2026 EQ_{130}	—	—	—	—	47.3	0.21	18	37.3	57.4	—	MPC; JPL
2026 EQ_{131}	—	—	—	—	43.6	0.13	15	37.7	49.4	—	MPC; JPL
2026 EQ_{132}	—	—	—	—	45.1	0.13	4	39.3	50.9	—	MPC; JPL
2026 EQ_{133}	—	—	—	—	43.8	0.06	4	41.2	46.3	—	MPC; JPL
2026 EQ_{134}	—	—	—	—	39.4	0.18	2	32.1	46.6	—	MPC; JPL
2026 EQ_{135}	—	—	—	—	44.7	0.10	5	40.2	49.2	—	MPC; JPL
2026 EQ_{136}	—	—	—	—	42.9	0.15	22	36.2	49.5	—	MPC; JPL
2026 EQ_{137}	—	—	—	—	40.9	0.11	27	36.3	45.5	—	MPC; JPL
2026 EQ_{138}	—	—	—	—	43.0	0.27	22	31.4	54.5	—	MPC; JPL
2026 EQ_{139}	—	—	—	—	43.7	0.05	6	41.4	46.1	—	MPC; JPL
2026 EQ_{140}	—	—	—	—	38.4	0.08	27	35.2	41.6	—	MPC; JPL
2026 EQ_{141}	—	—	—	—	43.7	0.08	3	40.2	47.3	—	MPC; JPL
2026 EQ_{142}	—	—	—	—	44.9	0.10	8	40.2	49.6	—	MPC; JPL
2026 EQ_{143}	—	—	—	—	43.6	0.17	14	36.2	51.0	—	MPC; JPL
2026 EQ_{144}	—	—	—	—	39.2	0.15	8	33.2	45.3	—	MPC; JPL
2026 EQ_{145}	—	—	—	—	48.3	0.40	21	29.1	67.4	—	MPC; JPL
2026 EQ_{146}	—	—	—	—	305.8	0.87	16	39.5	572.0	—	MPC; JPL
2026 EQ_{147}	—	—	—	—	47.5	0.28	16	34.3	60.7	—	MPC; JPL
2026 ER_{122}	—	—	—	—	101.4	0.66	5	34.0	168.7	—	MPC; JPL
2026 ER_{123}	—	—	—	—	46.4	0.32	6	31.5	61.3	—	MPC; JPL
2026 ER_{124}	—	—	—	—	40.9	0.05	27	38.9	42.9	—	MPC; JPL
2026 ER_{125}	—	—	—	—	36.4	0.17	13	30.2	42.5	—	MPC; JPL
2026 ER_{126}	—	—	—	—	49.6	0.23	11	38.1	61.1	—	MPC; JPL
2026 ER_{127}	—	—	—	—	43.6	0.13	13	38.0	49.1	—	MPC; JPL
2026 ER_{128}	—	—	—	—	92.0	0.56	0	40.4	143.6	—	MPC; JPL
2026 ER_{129}	—	—	—	—	42.5	0.15	19	36.1	48.8	—	MPC; JPL
2026 ER_{130}	—	—	—	—	43.7	0.15	17	37.2	50.3	—	MPC; JPL
2026 ER_{131}	—	—	—	—	55.2	0.29	36	39.0	71.3	—	MPC; JPL
2026 ER_{132}	—	—	—	—	42.0	0.05	23	39.8	44.2	—	MPC; JPL
2026 ER_{133}	—	—	—	—	44.7	0.07	2	41.5	47.8	—	MPC; JPL
2026 ER_{134}	—	—	—	—	46.3	0.10	9	41.4	51.1	—	MPC; JPL
2026 ER_{135}	—	—	—	—	55.4	0.26	9	40.8	70.0	—	MPC; JPL
2026 ER_{137}	—	—	—	—	57.1	0.35	17	36.9	77.3	—	MPC; JPL
2026 ER_{138}	—	—	—	—	43.9	0.03	5	42.7	45.1	—	MPC; JPL
2026 ER_{139}	—	—	—	—	42.8	0.13	28	37.2	48.5	—	MPC; JPL
2026 ER_{140}	—	—	—	—	47.1	0.13	11	41.2	53.1	—	MPC; JPL
2026 ER_{141}	—	—	—	—	43.9	0.05	3	41.5	46.3	—	MPC; JPL
2026 ER_{142}	—	—	—	—	43.2	0.08	14	39.8	46.6	—	MPC; JPL
2026 ER_{143}	—	—	—	—	43.3	0.07	4	40.3	46.4	—	MPC; JPL
2026 ER_{144}	—	—	—	—	43.6	0.06	13	41.1	46.1	—	MPC; JPL
2026 ER_{145}	—	—	—	—	42.5	0.12	16	37.4	47.6	—	MPC; JPL
2026 ER_{146}	—	—	—	—	40.5	0.08	18	37.4	43.6	—	MPC; JPL
2026 ER_{147}	—	—	—	—	49.0	0.29	10	35.0	62.9	—	MPC; JPL
2026 ES_{123}	—	—	—	—	363.5	0.91	14	32.9	694.0	—	MPC; JPL
2026 ES_{124}	—	—	—	—	85.2	0.56	21	37.4	132.9	—	MPC; JPL
2026 ES_{125}	—	—	—	—	210.3	0.89	15	22.1	398.5	—	MPC; JPL
2026 ES_{126}	—	—	—	—	41.4	0.21	20	32.8	50.0	—	MPC; JPL
2026 ES_{127}	—	—	—	—	108.7	0.62	1	40.8	176.6	—	MPC; JPL
2026 ES_{128}	—	—	—	—	47.2	0.25	8	35.4	58.9	—	MPC; JPL
2026 ES_{129}	—	—	—	—	72.5	0.49	15	37.0	108.0	—	MPC; JPL
2026 ES_{130}	—	—	—	—	53.3	0.31	11	36.7	69.9	—	MPC; JPL
2026 ES_{131}	—	—	—	—	42.4	0.08	12	39.0	45.8	—	MPC; JPL
2026 ES_{132}	—	—	—	—	38.2	0.06	26	35.9	40.6	—	MPC; JPL
2026 ES_{133}	—	—	—	—	49.2	0.19	4	39.8	58.7	—	MPC; JPL
2026 ES_{134}	—	—	—	—	42.4	0.03	8	41.0	43.8	—	MPC; JPL
2026 ES_{135}	—	—	—	—	57.3	0.35	22	37.4	77.2	—	MPC; JPL
2026 ES_{136}	—	—	—	—	53.2	0.28	21	38.4	67.9	—	MPC; JPL
2026 ES_{137}	—	—	—	—	87.6	0.62	18	33.5	141.6	—	MPC; JPL
2026 ES_{138}	—	—	—	—	48.5	0.19	6	39.2	57.9	—	MPC; JPL
2026 ES_{139}	—	—	—	—	43.0	0.19	6	34.7	51.2	—	MPC; JPL
2026 ES_{140}	—	—	—	—	41.3	0.14	26	35.7	46.8	—	MPC; JPL
2026 ES_{141}	—	—	—	—	45.7	0.05	4	43.3	48.0	—	MPC; JPL
2026 ES_{142}	—	—	—	—	44.9	0.17	9	37.3	52.4	—	MPC; JPL
2026 ES_{143}	—	—	—	—	44.3	0.04	5	42.7	45.9	—	MPC; JPL
2026 ES_{144}	—	—	—	—	43.7	0.12	9	38.4	49.1	—	MPC; JPL
2026 ES_{145}	—	—	—	—	38.7	0.07	25	36.1	41.3	—	MPC; JPL
2026 ES_{146}	—	—	—	—	39.4	0.23	30	30.4	48.4	—	MPC; JPL
2026 ES_{147}	—	—	—	—	46.0	0.16	9	38.7	53.3	—	MPC; JPL
2026 ET_{122}	—	—	—	—	38.4	0.14	26	33.1	43.8	—	MPC; JPL
2026 ET_{123}	—	—	—	—	49.7	0.41	8	29.1	70.2	—	MPC; JPL
2026 ET_{124}	—	—	—	—	42.1	0.16	42	35.6	48.7	—	MPC; JPL
2026 ET_{125}	—	—	—	—	47.4	0.48	24	24.7	70.1	—	MPC; JPL
2026 ET_{126}	—	—	—	—	68.9	0.35	2	44.5	93.3	—	MPC; JPL
2026 ET_{127}	—	—	—	—	133.2	0.71	2	38.2	228.1	—	MPC; JPL
2026 ET_{128}	—	—	—	—	54.6	0.10	6	49.1	60.2	—	MPC; JPL
2026 ET_{129}	—	—	—	—	40.1	0.15	22	34.2	45.9	—	MPC; JPL
2026 ET_{130}	—	—	—	—	36.8	0.04	10	35.4	38.2	—	MPC; JPL
2026 ET_{131}	—	—	—	—	42.5	0.08	12	39.0	45.9	—	MPC; JPL
2026 ET_{132}	—	—	—	—	44.2	0.09	3	40.3	48.0	—	MPC; JPL
2026 ET_{133}	—	—	—	—	43.9	0.11	3	39.1	48.7	—	MPC; JPL
2026 ET_{134}	—	—	—	—	48.1	0.15	19	41.1	55.1	—	MPC; JPL
2026 ET_{135}	—	—	—	—	68.2	0.42	22	39.6	96.7	—	MPC; JPL
2026 ET_{136}	—	—	—	—	40.8	0.13	20	35.4	46.3	—	MPC; JPL
2026 ET_{138}	—	—	—	—	74.0	0.46	13	39.7	108.4	—	MPC; JPL
2026 ET_{140}	—	—	—	—	45.8	0.14	29	39.6	52.1	—	MPC; JPL
2026 ET_{141}	—	—	—	—	42.7	0.04	2	41.1	44.3	—	MPC; JPL
2026 ET_{142}	—	—	—	—	45.9	0.08	7	42.4	49.4	—	MPC; JPL
2026 ET_{143}	—	—	—	—	43.7	0.11	21	39.0	48.4	—	MPC; JPL
2026 ET_{144}	—	—	—	—	46.0	0.15	7	39.0	53.0	—	MPC; JPL
2026 ET_{145}	—	—	—	—	43.5	0.03	4	42.1	45.0	—	MPC; JPL
2026 ET_{146}	—	—	—	—	45.9	0.24	25	34.7	57.1	—	MPC; JPL
2026 ET_{147}	—	—	—	—	39.4	0.16	12	32.9	45.8	—	MPC; JPL
2026 EU_{122}	—	—	—	—	63.8	0.59	23	26.4	101.2	—	MPC; JPL
2026 EU_{123}	—	—	—	—	41.7	0.20	7	33.4	49.9	—	MPC; JPL
2026 EU_{124}	—	—	—	—	46.2	0.33	9	30.8	61.7	—	MPC; JPL
2026 EU_{126}	—	—	—	—	49.5	0.26	30	36.6	62.4	—	MPC; JPL
2026 EU_{127}	—	—	—	—	125.5	0.68	3	39.8	211.2	—	MPC; JPL
2026 EU_{128}	—	—	—	—	88.6	0.56	5	39.4	137.9	—	MPC; JPL
2026 EU_{129}	—	—	—	—	42.6	0.10	29	38.3	46.9	—	MPC; JPL
2026 EU_{130}	—	—	—	—	39.0	0.08	34	36.1	41.9	—	MPC; JPL
2026 EU_{131}	—	—	—	—	78.8	0.50	23	39.4	118.3	—	MPC; JPL
2026 EU_{132}	—	—	—	—	39.0	0.17	4	32.3	45.8	—	MPC; JPL
2026 EU_{133}	—	—	—	—	42.6	0.16	17	35.6	49.6	—	MPC; JPL
2026 EU_{134}	—	—	—	—	43.8	0.01	1	43.4	44.3	—	MPC; JPL
2026 EU_{135}	—	—	—	—	81.0	0.53	25	38.4	123.6	—	MPC; JPL
2026 EU_{136}	—	—	—	—	43.9	0.14	6	37.8	50.0	—	MPC; JPL
2026 EU_{138}	—	—	—	—	95.0	0.59	27	38.9	151.2	—	MPC; JPL
2026 EU_{139}	—	—	—	—	93.9	0.61	27	36.5	151.2	—	MPC; JPL
2026 EU_{140}	—	—	—	—	39.5	0.18	28	32.4	46.6	—	MPC; JPL
2026 EU_{141}	—	—	—	—	50.5	0.24	3	38.2	62.7	—	MPC; JPL
2026 EU_{142}	—	—	—	—	42.6	0.04	6	40.8	44.4	—	MPC; JPL
2026 EU_{143}	—	—	—	—	39.4	0.15	24	33.5	45.4	—	MPC; JPL
2026 EU_{144}	—	—	—	—	47.9	0.09	12	43.6	52.3	—	MPC; JPL
2026 EU_{145}	—	—	—	—	41.9	0.08	25	38.4	45.4	—	MPC; JPL
2026 EU_{146}	—	—	—	—	44.8	0.10	6	40.4	49.2	—	MPC; JPL
2026 EU_{147}	—	—	—	—	55.2	0.42	9	31.9	78.6	—	MPC; JPL
2026 EV_{122}	—	—	—	—	115.2	0.71	34	33.5	197.0	—	MPC; JPL
2026 EV_{123}	—	—	—	—	93.6	0.59	21	38.4	148.8	—	MPC; JPL
2026 EV_{124}	—	—	—	—	69.0	0.41	1	40.9	97.0	—	MPC; JPL
2026 EV_{125}	—	—	—	—	57.5	0.33	1	38.7	76.4	—	MPC; JPL
2026 EV_{126}	—	—	—	—	39.4	0.29	13	28.1	50.7	—	MPC; JPL
2026 EV_{127}	—	—	—	—	114.1	0.66	3	39.2	188.9	—	MPC; JPL
2026 EV_{128}	—	—	—	—	43.6	0.05	11	41.2	45.9	—	MPC; JPL
2026 EV_{129}	—	—	—	—	65.4	0.51	19	32.0	98.9	—	MPC; JPL
2026 EV_{130}	—	—	—	—	47.5	0.21	34	37.7	57.3	—	MPC; JPL
2026 EV_{131}	—	—	—	—	46.1	0.15	3	39.4	52.9	—	MPC; JPL
2026 EV_{132}	—	—	—	—	41.0	0.08	27	37.8	44.1	—	MPC; JPL
2026 EV_{133}	—	—	—	—	52.6	0.28	24	38.1	67.0	—	MPC; JPL
2026 EV_{134}	—	—	—	—	44.6	0.09	1	40.3	48.8	—	MPC; JPL
2026 EV_{136}	—	—	—	—	73.3	0.54	23	33.6	113.0	—	MPC; JPL
2026 EV_{138}	—	—	—	—	40.6	0.24	13	31.0	50.1	—	MPC; JPL
2026 EV_{139}	—	—	—	—	35.5	0.62	64	13.3	57.7	—	MPC; JPL
2026 EV_{140}	—	—	—	—	45.3	0.02	31	44.5	46.1	—	MPC; JPL
2026 EV_{141}	—	—	—	—	43.9	0.06	4	41.2	46.5	—	MPC; JPL
2026 EV_{142}	—	—	—	—	47.0	0.10	4	42.4	51.6	—	MPC; JPL
2026 EV_{143}	—	—	—	—	45.5	0.08	4	41.8	49.2	—	MPC; JPL
2026 EV_{144}	—	—	—	—	48.5	0.27	30	35.6	61.4	—	MPC; JPL
2026 EV_{145}	—	—	—	—	39.3	0.16	15	32.9	45.6	—	MPC; JPL
2026 EV_{146}	—	—	—	—	43.4	0.17	25	36.1	50.6	—	MPC; JPL
2026 EV_{147}	—	—	—	—	41.7	0.02	12	40.7	42.6	—	MPC; JPL
2026 EW_{123}	—	—	—	—	46.0	0.22	32	36.0	56.0	—	MPC; JPL
2026 EW_{124}	—	—	—	—	45.9	0.22	16	35.8	56.0	—	MPC; JPL
2026 EW_{125}	—	—	—	—	83.1	0.61	12	32.6	133.6	—	MPC; JPL
2026 EW_{126}	—	—	—	—	66.9	0.51	12	33.0	100.7	—	MPC; JPL
2026 EW_{127}	—	—	—	—	132.7	0.69	1	41.2	224.1	—	MPC; JPL
2026 EW_{128}	—	—	—	—	60.4	0.47	9	32.0	88.8	—	MPC; JPL
2026 EW_{129}	—	—	—	—	41.1	0.08	26	37.7	44.6	—	MPC; JPL
2026 EW_{130}	—	—	—	—	63.6	0.41	20	37.8	89.4	—	MPC; JPL
2026 EW_{131}	—	—	—	—	42.4	0.13	18	37.0	47.8	—	MPC; JPL
2026 EW_{132}	—	—	—	—	44.2	0.09	5	40.3	48.1	—	MPC; JPL
2026 EW_{133}	—	—	—	—	42.7	0.06	4	40.2	45.2	—	MPC; JPL
2026 EW_{134}	—	—	—	—	56.0	0.43	0	32.1	79.8	—	MPC; JPL
2026 EW_{135}	—	—	—	—	52.4	0.10	7	47.1	57.6	—	MPC; JPL
2026 EW_{136}	—	—	—	—	39.2	0.11	31	34.8	43.6	—	MPC; JPL
2026 EW_{138}	—	—	—	—	53.4	0.31	25	36.7	70.0	—	MPC; JPL
2026 EW_{139}	—	—	—	—	40.8	0.18	15	33.3	48.2	—	MPC; JPL
2026 EW_{140}	—	—	—	—	52.7	0.21	30	41.7	63.6	—	MPC; JPL
2026 EW_{141}	—	—	—	—	43.9	0.09	2	40.2	47.7	—	MPC; JPL
2026 EW_{142}	—	—	—	—	43.0	0.02	3	42.3	43.7	—	MPC; JPL
2026 EW_{143}	—	—	—	—	38.9	0.08	6	35.9	41.9	—	MPC; JPL
2026 EW_{144}	—	—	—	—	39.3	0.26	13	29.1	49.5	—	MPC; JPL
2026 EW_{145}	—	—	—	—	39.1	0.26	5	28.9	49.4	—	MPC; JPL
2026 EW_{146}	—	—	—	—	35.0	0.07	8	32.5	37.4	—	MPC; JPL
2026 EW_{147}	—	—	—	—	476.7	0.91	11	42.2	911.2	—	MPC; JPL
2026 EX_{122}	—	—	—	—	206.2	0.84	3	33.9	378.6	—	MPC; JPL
2026 EX_{123}	—	—	—	—	76.7	0.67	5	25.2	128.1	—	MPC; JPL
2026 EX_{124}	—	—	—	—	43.0	0.24	17	32.7	53.4	—	MPC; JPL
2026 EX_{125}	—	—	—	—	56.7	0.54	11	26.0	87.4	—	MPC; JPL
2026 EX_{126}	—	—	—	—	48.6	0.39	11	29.8	67.3	—	MPC; JPL
2026 EX_{127}	—	—	—	—	45.1	0.10	57	40.6	49.6	—	MPC; JPL
2026 EX_{128}	—	—	—	—	41.9	0.14	24	35.8	48.0	—	MPC; JPL
2026 EX_{129}	—	—	—	—	89.6	0.68	4	28.3	151.0	—	MPC; JPL
2026 EX_{130}	—	—	—	—	123.3	0.78	14	26.8	219.8	—	MPC; JPL
2026 EX_{131}	—	—	—	—	39.1	0.13	3	34.2	44.1	—	MPC; JPL
2026 EX_{132}	—	—	—	—	51.2	0.39	10	31.0	71.4	—	MPC; JPL
2026 EX_{133}	—	—	—	—	43.1	0.02	4	42.1	44.0	—	MPC; JPL
2026 EX_{134}	—	—	—	—	45.2	0.18	27	36.9	53.6	—	MPC; JPL
2026 EX_{135}	—	—	—	—	50.6	0.29	21	36.2	65.1	—	MPC; JPL
2026 EX_{136}	—	—	—	—	40.6	0.09	20	37.0	44.1	—	MPC; JPL
2026 EX_{138}	—	—	—	—	40.8	0.11	46	36.2	45.3	—	MPC; JPL
2026 EX_{139}	—	—	—	—	44.0	0.13	21	38.1	49.9	—	MPC; JPL
2026 EX_{140}	—	—	—	—	67.1	0.47	37	35.9	98.4	—	MPC; JPL
2026 EX_{141}	—	—	—	—	44.8	0.04	3	42.8	46.7	—	MPC; JPL
2026 EX_{142}	—	—	—	—	44.2	0.06	4	41.4	47.0	—	MPC; JPL
2026 EX_{143}	—	—	—	—	52.8	0.25	13	39.4	66.3	—	MPC; JPL
2026 EX_{144}	—	—	—	—	45.5	0.06	24	43.0	48.1	—	MPC; JPL
2026 EX_{145}	—	—	—	—	39.1	0.18	13	32.1	46.0	—	MPC; JPL
2026 EX_{146}	—	—	—	—	43.3	0.08	23	39.7	47.0	—	MPC; JPL
2026 EX_{147}	—	—	—	—	34.7	0.08	10	31.9	37.5	—	MPC; JPL
2026 EY_{122}	—	—	—	—	59.2	0.34	18	39.2	79.3	—	MPC; JPL
2026 EY_{123}	—	—	—	—	49.3	0.25	23	37.0	61.7	—	MPC; JPL
2026 EY_{124}	—	—	—	—	74.4	0.45	22	41.0	107.8	—	MPC; JPL
2026 EY_{125}	—	—	—	—	45.0	0.10	19	40.4	49.6	—	MPC; JPL
2026 EY_{126}	—	—	—	—	90.0	0.73	9	23.9	156.2	—	MPC; JPL
2026 EY_{127}	—	—	—	—	155.4	0.75	7	38.9	272.0	—	MPC; JPL
2026 EY_{128}	—	—	—	—	53.1	0.35	4	34.2	71.9	—	MPC; JPL
2026 EY_{129}	—	—	—	—	35.9	0.09	10	32.6	39.2	—	MPC; JPL
2026 EY_{130}	—	—	—	—	42.2	0.13	1	36.9	47.5	—	MPC; JPL
2026 EY_{131}	—	—	—	—	69.9	0.46	20	38.0	101.8	—	MPC; JPL
2026 EY_{132}	—	—	—	—	44.3	0.08	31	40.7	47.9	—	MPC; JPL
2026 EY_{133}	—	—	—	—	44.3	0.05	28	41.9	46.7	—	MPC; JPL
2026 EY_{134}	—	—	—	—	45.7	0.13	6	39.8	51.6	—	MPC; JPL
2026 EY_{135}	—	—	—	—	67.9	0.42	22	39.7	96.1	—	MPC; JPL
2026 EY_{136}	—	—	—	—	42.8	0.08	22	39.6	46.1	—	MPC; JPL
2026 EY_{138}	—	—	—	—	49.7	0.38	23	30.9	68.6	—	MPC; JPL
2026 EY_{139}	—	—	—	—	48.2	0.17	13	39.8	56.6	—	MPC; JPL
2026 EY_{140}	—	—	—	—	45.6	0.08	29	41.9	49.3	—	MPC; JPL
2026 EY_{141}	—	—	—	—	45.8	0.11	2	40.8	50.8	—	MPC; JPL
2026 EY_{142}	—	—	—	—	45.4	0.09	5	41.3	49.4	—	MPC; JPL
2026 EY_{143}	—	—	—	—	39.6	0.25	15	29.7	49.5	—	MPC; JPL
2026 EY_{144}	—	—	—	—	52.6	0.30	8	36.6	68.5	—	MPC; JPL
2026 EY_{145}	—	—	—	—	42.2	0.14	5	36.1	48.3	—	MPC; JPL
2026 EY_{146}	—	—	—	—	39.1	0.18	13	32.2	46.0	—	MPC; JPL
2026 EY_{147}	—	—	—	—	48.0	0.20	33	38.6	57.5	—	MPC; JPL
2026 EZ_{122}	—	—	—	—	54.2	0.36	14	34.7	73.8	—	MPC; JPL
2026 EZ_{123}	—	—	—	—	42.5	0.15	18	36.1	49.0	—	MPC; JPL
2026 EZ_{124}	—	—	—	—	39.1	0.20	28	31.2	47.0	—	MPC; JPL
2026 EZ_{125}	—	—	—	—	43.9	0.14	3	37.9	50.0	—	MPC; JPL
2026 EZ_{126}	—	—	—	—	49.7	0.10	10	44.8	54.6	—	MPC; JPL
2026 EZ_{127}	—	—	—	—	160.8	0.74	2	42.4	279.2	—	MPC; JPL
2026 EZ_{128}	—	—	—	—	42.7	0.16	32	35.9	49.5	—	MPC; JPL
2026 EZ_{129}	—	—	—	—	45.1	0.24	30	34.1	56.0	—	MPC; JPL
2026 EZ_{130}	—	—	—	—	36.3	0.10	2	32.9	39.8	—	MPC; JPL
2026 EZ_{131}	—	—	—	—	41.4	0.15	15	35.2	47.5	—	MPC; JPL
2026 EZ_{132}	—	—	—	—	44.1	0.08	3	40.7	47.5	—	MPC; JPL
2026 EZ_{133}	—	—	—	—	43.3	0.05	3	41.3	45.3	—	MPC; JPL
2026 EZ_{134}	—	—	—	—	45.9	0.05	14	43.4	48.4	—	MPC; JPL
2026 EZ_{135}	—	—	—	—	58.4	0.41	27	34.4	82.4	—	MPC; JPL
2026 EZ_{136}	—	—	—	—	41.5	0.11	11	37.1	45.9	—	MPC; JPL
2026 EZ_{138}	—	—	—	—	40.6	0.05	18	38.7	42.5	—	MPC; JPL
2026 EZ_{139}	—	—	—	—	39.7	0.15	25	33.9	45.6	—	MPC; JPL
2026 EZ_{140}	—	—	—	—	51.7	0.32	35	34.9	68.5	—	MPC; JPL
2026 EZ_{141}	—	—	—	—	43.5	0.01	3	43.3	43.8	—	MPC; JPL
2026 EZ_{142}	—	—	—	—	42.8	0.07	4	39.9	45.8	—	MPC; JPL
2026 EZ_{143}	—	—	—	—	39.3	0.24	7	29.9	48.8	—	MPC; JPL
2026 EZ_{144}	—	—	—	—	44.2	0.11	29	39.2	49.3	—	MPC; JPL
2026 EZ_{145}	—	—	—	—	39.3	0.25	22	29.3	49.3	—	MPC; JPL
2026 EZ_{146}	—	—	—	—	42.6	0.09	14	38.6	46.6	—	MPC; JPL
2026 EZ_{147}	—	—	—	—	39.4	0.24	23	29.8	49.0	—	MPC; JPL
2026 FA_{35}	—	—	—	—	47.4	0.16	6	39.8	55.0	—	MPC; JPL
2026 FA_{36}	—	—	—	—	40.4	0.02	19	39.6	41.2	—	MPC; JPL
2026 FA_{37}	—	—	—	—	47.7	0.28	38	34.2	61.2	—	MPC; JPL
2026 FA_{38}	—	—	—	—	47.9	0.27	13	35.2	60.6	—	MPC; JPL
2026 FA_{39}	—	—	—	—	43.5	0.07	16	40.5	46.4	—	MPC; JPL
2026 FB_{35}	—	—	—	—	43.3	0.10	26	38.9	47.8	—	MPC; JPL
2026 FB_{37}	—	—	—	—	52.9	0.28	31	37.9	67.9	—	MPC; JPL
2026 FB_{38}	—	—	—	—	44.9	0.15	7	38.0	51.8	—	MPC; JPL
2026 FB_{39}	—	—	—	—	68.6	0.50	18	34.1	103.1	—	MPC; JPL
2026 FC_{35}	—	—	—	—	137.1	0.71	38	40.0	234.2	—	MPC; JPL
2026 FC_{37}	—	—	—	—	55.1	0.38	10	34.0	76.1	—	MPC; JPL
2026 FC_{38}	—	—	—	—	55.4	0.40	7	33.0	77.8	—	MPC; JPL
2026 FC_{39}	—	—	—	—	65.6	0.46	16	35.2	96.0	—	MPC; JPL
2026 FD_{35}	—	—	—	—	366.5	0.91	36	31.8	701.2	—	MPC; JPL
2026 FD_{37}	—	—	—	—	38.6	0.03	35	37.6	39.5	—	MPC; JPL
2026 FD_{38}	—	—	—	—	39.3	0.27	7	28.7	50.0	—	MPC; JPL
2026 FD_{39}	—	—	—	—	52.4	0.29	16	37.2	67.6	—	MPC; JPL
2026 FE_{35}	—	—	—	—	47.2	0.15	27	40.2	54.1	—	MPC; JPL
2026 FE_{37}	—	—	—	—	46.0	0.11	29	40.7	51.3	—	MPC; JPL
2026 FE_{38}	—	—	—	—	103.6	0.70	12	31.4	175.9	—	MPC; JPL
2026 FF_{35}	—	—	—	—	45.9	0.16	6	38.6	53.2	—	MPC; JPL
2026 FF_{37}	—	—	—	—	42.5	0.10	24	38.3	46.7	—	MPC; JPL
2026 FF_{38}	—	—	—	—	62.0	0.35	15	40.1	83.9	—	MPC; JPL
2026 FG_{35}	—	—	—	—	45.0	0.11	1	39.9	50.2	—	MPC; JPL
2026 FG_{37}	—	—	—	—	43.4	0.12	24	38.3	48.4	—	MPC; JPL
2026 FG_{38}	—	—	—	—	60.9	0.32	25	41.5	80.3	—	MPC; JPL
2026 FH_{34}	—	—	—	—	43.6	0.14	25	37.4	49.8	—	MPC; JPL
2026 FH_{35}	—	—	—	—	44.1	0.11	2	39.3	48.8	—	MPC; JPL
2026 FH_{37}	—	—	—	—	38.6	0.07	25	36.0	41.2	—	MPC; JPL
2026 FH_{38}	—	—	—	—	79.9	0.53	30	37.9	121.9	—	MPC; JPL
2026 FJ_{34}	—	—	—	—	44.1	0.24	23	33.7	54.5	—	MPC; JPL
2026 FJ_{35}	—	—	—	—	44.0	0.06	5	41.4	46.6	—	MPC; JPL
2026 FJ_{37}	—	—	—	—	62.0	0.43	12	35.1	88.9	—	MPC; JPL
2026 FJ_{38}	—	—	—	—	39.3	0.17	7	32.6	46.0	—	MPC; JPL
2026 FK_{35}	—	—	—	—	44.6	0.09	5	40.6	48.5	—	MPC; JPL
2026 FK_{37}	—	—	—	—	42.7	0.13	6	37.2	48.2	—	MPC; JPL
2026 FK_{38}	—	—	—	—	39.4	0.25	8	29.5	49.3	—	MPC; JPL
2026 FL_{35}	—	—	—	—	43.5	0.09	13	39.8	47.3	—	MPC; JPL
2026 FL_{37}	—	—	—	—	175.0	0.80	13	34.5	315.4	—	MPC; JPL
2026 FL_{38}	—	—	—	—	39.3	0.31	8	27.2	51.4	—	MPC; JPL
2026 FM_{34}	—	—	—	—	60.5	0.45	22	33.1	87.9	—	MPC; JPL
2026 FM_{35}	—	—	—	—	41.7	0.06	31	39.0	44.4	—	MPC; JPL
2026 FM_{37}	—	—	—	—	45.8	0.02	18	44.9	46.7	—	MPC; JPL
2026 FM_{38}	—	—	—	—	46.2	0.19	7	37.3	55.1	—	MPC; JPL
2026 FN_{35}	—	—	—	—	94.1	0.54	28	42.9	145.2	—	MPC; JPL
2026 FN_{37}	—	—	—	—	52.3	0.35	29	34.1	70.4	—	MPC; JPL
2026 FN_{38}	—	—	—	—	39.3	0.22	7	30.6	48.1	—	MPC; JPL
2026 FO_{35}	—	—	—	—	45.2	0.20	23	36.2	54.1	—	MPC; JPL
2026 FO_{37}	—	—	—	—	112.5	0.68	23	36.2	188.7	—	MPC; JPL
2026 FO_{38}	—	—	—	—	39.2	0.20	19	31.2	47.1	—	MPC; JPL
2026 FP_{35}	—	—	—	—	44.7	0.08	2	41.0	48.4	—	MPC; JPL
2026 FP_{37}	—	—	—	—	39.4	0.25	26	29.4	49.4	—	MPC; JPL
2026 FP_{38}	—	—	—	—	42.4	0.16	22	35.8	49.1	—	MPC; JPL
2026 FQ_{35}	—	—	—	—	125.1	0.63	60	45.9	204.2	—	MPC; JPL
2026 FQ_{37}	—	—	—	—	55.5	0.33	16	37.4	73.6	—	MPC; JPL
2026 FQ_{38}	—	—	—	—	40.6	0.11	16	36.2	44.9	—	MPC; JPL
2026 FR_{34}	—	—	—	—	43.6	0.18	9	35.6	51.7	—	MPC; JPL
2026 FR_{35}	—	—	—	—	46.7	0.18	9	38.2	55.3	—	MPC; JPL
2026 FR_{37}	—	—	—	—	43.9	0.37	17	27.9	60.0	—	MPC; JPL
2026 FR_{38}	—	—	—	—	51.3	0.80	18	10.5	92.1	—	MPC; JPL
2026 FS_{34}	—	—	—	—	47.0	0.22	34	36.8	57.2	—	MPC; JPL
2026 FS_{35}	—	—	—	—	81.0	0.57	16	34.8	127.2	—	MPC; JPL
2026 FS_{37}	—	—	—	—	43.7	0.10	27	39.3	48.1	—	MPC; JPL
2026 FS_{38}	—	—	—	—	59.1	0.14	12	50.6	67.6	—	MPC; JPL
2026 FT_{34}	—	—	—	—	43.6	0.16	27	36.8	50.4	—	MPC; JPL
2026 FT_{35}	—	—	—	—	50.0	0.32	21	33.9	66.0	—	MPC; JPL
2026 FT_{37}	—	—	—	—	57.1	0.53	27	26.7	87.5	—	MPC; JPL
2026 FU_{34}	—	—	—	—	40.9	0.11	28	36.4	45.4	—	MPC; JPL
2026 FU_{35}	—	—	—	—	52.0	0.28	14	37.6	66.5	—	MPC; JPL
2026 FU_{37}	—	—	—	—	46.1	0.19	20	37.4	54.8	—	MPC; JPL
2026 FU_{38}	—	—	—	—	34.8	0.20	11	27.8	41.8	—	MPC; JPL
2026 FV_{34}	—	—	—	—	43.8	0.17	8	36.4	51.2	—	MPC; JPL
2026 FV_{35}	—	—	—	—	42.9	0.12	17	37.6	48.3	—	MPC; JPL
2026 FV_{37}	—	—	—	—	150.6	0.77	20	35.0	266.1	—	MPC; JPL
2026 FV_{38}	—	—	—	—	41.5	0.14	11	35.6	47.3	—	MPC; JPL
2026 FW_{34}	—	—	—	—	42.7	0.14	27	36.8	48.7	—	MPC; JPL
2026 FW_{35}	—	—	—	—	42.6	0.10	17	38.3	46.9	—	MPC; JPL
2026 FW_{37}	—	—	—	—	54.7	0.36	11	34.9	74.5	—	MPC; JPL
2026 FW_{38}	—	—	—	—	73.3	0.51	32	36.2	110.3	—	MPC; JPL
2026 FX_{34}	—	—	—	—	41.7	0.06	25	39.1	44.3	—	MPC; JPL
2026 FX_{35}	—	—	—	—	47.1	0.15	5	40.1	54.2	—	MPC; JPL
2026 FX_{37}	—	—	—	—	45.3	0.17	31	37.8	52.8	—	MPC; JPL
2026 FX_{38}	—	—	—	—	40.5	0.03	18	39.3	41.7	—	MPC; JPL
2026 FY_{34}	—	—	—	—	42.9	0.10	13	38.6	47.2	—	MPC; JPL
2026 FY_{35}	—	—	—	—	51.1	0.12	14	45.2	57.0	—	MPC; JPL
2026 FY_{37}	—	—	—	—	90.2	0.59	28	36.6	143.9	—	MPC; JPL
2026 FY_{38}	—	—	—	—	38.3	0.08	29	35.1	41.4	—	MPC; JPL
2026 FZ_{34}	—	—	—	—	43.8	0.11	4	39.1	48.4	—	MPC; JPL
2026 FZ_{35}	—	—	—	—	55.3	0.05	29	52.3	58.2	—	MPC; JPL
2026 FZ_{37}	—	—	—	—	45.4	0.24	28	34.7	56.2	—	MPC; JPL
2026 FZ_{38}	—	—	—	—	73.1	0.51	19	35.6	110.5	—	MPC; JPL
2026 GA_{21}	—	—	—	—	48.1	0.45	19	26.5	69.6	—	MPC; JPL
2026 GA_{22}	—	—	—	—	40.2	0.05	21	38.2	42.2	—	MPC; JPL
2026 GA_{23}	—	—	—	—	45.0	0.30	17	31.4	58.6	—	MPC; JPL
2026 GA_{24}	—	—	—	—	45.7	0.12	18	40.1	51.4	—	MPC; JPL
2026 GA_{26}	—	—	—	—	48.0	0.26	15	35.4	60.6	—	MPC; JPL
2026 GA_{27}	—	—	—	—	65.9	0.45	12	36.3	95.6	—	MPC; JPL
2026 GA_{28}	—	—	—	—	46.8	0.05	25	44.6	48.9	—	MPC; JPL
2026 GA_{29}	—	—	—	—	68.8	0.54	26	31.5	106.1	—	MPC; JPL
2026 GB_{21}	—	—	—	—	39.5	0.23	6	30.5	48.4	—	MPC; JPL
2026 GB_{22}	—	—	—	—	91.1	0.63	32	33.7	148.5	—	MPC; JPL
2026 GB_{23}	—	—	—	—	43.5	0.08	14	39.8	47.2	—	MPC; JPL
2026 GB_{24}	—	—	—	—	46.6	0.23	16	35.7	57.4	—	MPC; JPL
2026 GB_{25}	—	—	—	—	80.6	0.58	11	33.9	127.2	—	MPC; JPL
2026 GB_{26}	—	—	—	—	40.6	0.12	24	35.9	45.4	—	MPC; JPL
2026 GB_{27}	—	—	—	—	39.7	0.25	7	29.9	49.6	—	MPC; JPL
2026 GB_{28}	—	—	—	—	40.4	0.11	18	35.9	44.8	—	MPC; JPL
2026 GB_{29}	—	—	—	—	83.0	0.56	7	36.9	129.2	—	MPC; JPL
2026 GC_{21}	—	—	—	—	87.8	0.63	27	32.7	142.9	—	MPC; JPL
2026 GC_{22}	—	—	—	—	50.4	0.26	20	37.5	63.4	—	MPC; JPL
2026 GC_{23}	—	—	—	—	48.0	0.23	14	37.0	59.1	—	MPC; JPL
2026 GC_{24}	—	—	—	—	54.2	0.36	23	34.9	73.5	—	MPC; JPL
2026 GC_{25}	—	—	—	—	40.3	0.27	7	29.6	51.1	—	MPC; JPL
2026 GC_{26}	—	—	—	—	42.5	0.21	17	33.6	51.4	—	MPC; JPL
2026 GC_{27}	—	—	—	—	41.7	0.09	26	38.0	45.3	—	MPC; JPL
2026 GC_{28}	—	—	—	—	39.2	0.15	16	33.6	44.9	—	MPC; JPL
2026 GD_{21}	—	—	—	—	43.2	0.28	11	31.0	55.5	—	MPC; JPL
2026 GD_{22}	—	—	—	—	41.8	0.08	21	38.6	45.0	—	MPC; JPL
2026 GD_{23}	—	—	—	—	41.4	0.02	24	40.6	42.3	—	MPC; JPL
2026 GD_{24}	—	—	—	—	43.7	0.28	17	31.6	55.9	—	MPC; JPL
2026 GD_{25}	—	—	—	—	46.3	0.25	4	34.6	57.9	—	MPC; JPL
2026 GD_{26}	—	—	—	—	80.1	0.54	24	36.6	123.6	—	MPC; JPL
2026 GD_{27}	—	—	—	—	59.2	0.40	18	35.3	83.1	—	MPC; JPL
2026 GD_{28}	—	—	—	—	46.4	0.23	15	35.9	56.9	—	MPC; JPL
2026 GE_{21}	—	—	—	—	106.3	0.68	27	33.5	179.0	—	MPC; JPL
2026 GE_{22}	—	—	—	—	42.9	0.14	15	37.1	48.7	—	MPC; JPL
2026 GE_{23}	—	—	—	—	52.0	0.26	11	38.4	65.6	—	MPC; JPL
2026 GE_{24}	—	—	—	—	47.0	0.25	18	35.3	58.7	—	MPC; JPL
2026 GE_{25}	—	—	—	—	42.3	0.17	10	35.2	49.5	—	MPC; JPL
2026 GE_{26}	—	—	—	—	42.3	0.18	33	34.5	50.1	—	MPC; JPL
2026 GE_{27}	—	—	—	—	40.7	0.22	17	31.8	49.7	—	MPC; JPL
2026 GE_{28}	—	—	—	—	63.3	0.45	19	34.7	91.8	—	MPC; JPL
2026 GF_{21}	—	—	—	—	72.1	0.53	32	34.2	109.9	—	MPC; JPL
2026 GF_{22}	—	—	—	—	42.0	0.12	24	37.1	46.8	—	MPC; JPL
2026 GF_{23}	—	—	—	—	70.0	0.49	14	35.9	104.2	—	MPC; JPL
2026 GF_{24}	—	—	—	—	46.3	0.22	13	36.3	56.4	—	MPC; JPL
2026 GF_{25}	—	—	—	—	43.7	0.05	6	41.4	46.1	—	MPC; JPL
2026 GF_{26}	—	—	—	—	44.1	0.14	24	37.8	50.3	—	MPC; JPL
2026 GF_{27}	—	—	—	—	52.1	0.26	11	38.5	65.6	—	MPC; JPL
2026 GF_{28}	—	—	—	—	41.5	0.19	24	33.5	49.5	—	MPC; JPL
2026 GG_{21}	—	—	—	—	42.8	0.18	22	34.9	50.7	—	MPC; JPL
2026 GG_{22}	—	—	—	—	40.4	0.04	26	38.9	42.0	—	MPC; JPL
2026 GG_{23}	—	—	—	—	45.8	0.10	7	41.1	50.4	—	MPC; JPL
2026 GG_{24}	—	—	—	—	38.0	0.00	20	37.9	38.1	—	MPC; JPL
2026 GG_{25}	—	—	—	—	43.5	0.19	8	35.4	51.6	—	MPC; JPL
2026 GG_{26}	—	—	—	—	38.4	0.09	29	35.0	41.9	—	MPC; JPL
2026 GG_{27}	—	—	—	—	41.5	0.15	23	35.3	47.7	—	MPC; JPL
2026 GG_{28}	—	—	—	—	68.1	0.47	16	36.1	100.0	—	MPC; JPL
2026 GH_{21}	—	—	—	—	48.0	0.29	25	34.1	61.8	—	MPC; JPL
2026 GH_{22}	—	—	—	—	64.1	0.42	36	37.1	91.2	—	MPC; JPL
2026 GH_{23}	—	—	—	—	47.6	0.19	26	38.4	56.8	—	MPC; JPL
2026 GH_{24}	—	—	—	—	43.5	0.09	8	39.6	47.4	—	MPC; JPL
2026 GH_{25}	—	—	—	—	47.9	0.12	25	41.9	53.8	—	MPC; JPL
2026 GH_{26}	—	—	—	—	56.2	0.34	10	37.2	75.3	—	MPC; JPL
2026 GH_{27}	—	—	—	—	39.3	0.28	4	28.2	50.4	—	MPC; JPL
2026 GH_{28}	—	—	—	—	43.1	0.20	28	34.7	51.5	—	MPC; JPL
2026 GJ_{21}	—	—	—	—	70.5	0.51	32	34.8	106.3	—	MPC; JPL
2026 GJ_{22}	—	—	—	—	56.7	0.34	25	37.7	75.7	—	MPC; JPL
2026 GJ_{23}	—	—	—	—	40.6	0.13	23	35.5	45.7	—	MPC; JPL
2026 GJ_{24}	—	—	—	—	44.1	0.09	4	40.1	48.1	—	MPC; JPL
2026 GJ_{25}	—	—	—	—	42.5	0.15	19	36.2	48.7	—	MPC; JPL
2026 GJ_{26}	—	—	—	—	56.0	0.42	18	32.4	79.6	—	MPC; JPL
2026 GJ_{27}	—	—	—	—	53.9	0.31	26	37.1	70.7	—	MPC; JPL
2026 GJ_{28}	—	—	—	—	39.2	0.20	24	31.3	47.1	—	MPC; JPL
2026 GK_{21}	—	—	—	—	39.0	0.09	31	35.7	42.4	—	MPC; JPL
2026 GK_{22}	—	—	—	—	41.9	0.19	17	33.9	49.8	—	MPC; JPL
2026 GK_{23}	—	—	—	—	42.9	0.03	4	41.7	44.2	—	MPC; JPL
2026 GK_{24}	—	—	—	—	50.2	0.30	14	35.1	65.4	—	MPC; JPL
2026 GK_{25}	—	—	—	—	74.8	0.52	15	35.8	113.8	—	MPC; JPL
2026 GK_{26}	—	—	—	—	57.8	0.44	15	32.3	83.2	—	MPC; JPL
2026 GK_{27}	—	—	—	—	104.4	0.66	19	35.1	173.7	—	MPC; JPL
2026 GK_{28}	—	—	—	—	44.1	0.01	25	43.8	44.5	—	MPC; JPL
2026 GL_{21}	—	—	—	—	44.1	0.27	5	32.3	56.0	—	MPC; JPL
2026 GL_{22}	—	—	—	—	59.2	0.35	24	38.6	79.9	—	MPC; JPL
2026 GL_{23}	—	—	—	—	42.5	0.07	8	39.3	45.7	—	MPC; JPL
2026 GL_{24}	—	—	—	—	41.9	0.06	15	39.5	44.3	—	MPC; JPL
2026 GL_{25}	—	—	—	—	52.4	0.31	22	36.1	68.7	—	MPC; JPL
2026 GL_{26}	—	—	—	—	76.9	0.54	16	35.2	118.5	—	MPC; JPL
2026 GL_{27}	—	—	—	—	39.4	0.13	35	34.4	44.4	—	MPC; JPL
2026 GL_{28}	—	—	—	—	43.9	0.02	31	43.1	44.8	—	MPC; JPL
2026 GM_{21}	—	—	—	—	47.3	0.33	18	31.7	62.9	—	MPC; JPL
2026 GM_{22}	—	—	—	—	57.8	0.39	38	35.0	80.5	—	MPC; JPL
2026 GM_{23}	—	—	—	—	43.6	0.05	4	41.5	45.6	—	MPC; JPL
2026 GM_{24}	—	—	—	—	41.3	0.08	18	38.1	44.6	—	MPC; JPL
2026 GM_{25}	—	—	—	—	46.6	0.20	27	37.5	55.8	—	MPC; JPL
2026 GM_{26}	—	—	—	—	42.2	0.03	14	41.0	43.3	—	MPC; JPL
2026 GM_{27}	—	—	—	—	42.6	0.05	5	40.3	44.9	—	MPC; JPL
2026 GM_{28}	—	—	—	—	53.5	0.38	28	33.1	73.9	—	MPC; JPL
2026 GN_{21}	—	—	—	—	70.5	0.49	17	36.2	104.8	—	MPC; JPL
2026 GN_{22}	—	—	—	—	40.7	0.08	17	37.6	43.8	—	MPC; JPL
2026 GN_{23}	—	—	—	—	43.3	0.05	5	41.1	45.5	—	MPC; JPL
2026 GN_{24}	—	—	—	—	102.6	0.62	18	38.6	166.6	—	MPC; JPL
2026 GN_{25}	—	—	—	—	41.5	0.12	31	36.4	46.6	—	MPC; JPL
2026 GN_{26}	—	—	—	—	39.2	0.24	11	29.8	48.5	—	MPC; JPL
2026 GN_{27}	—	—	—	—	40.6	0.10	18	36.4	44.7	—	MPC; JPL
2026 GN_{28}	—	—	—	—	41.2	0.14	32	35.5	47.0	—	MPC; JPL
2026 GO_{21}	—	—	—	—	40.5	0.15	7	34.4	46.6	—	MPC; JPL
2026 GO_{22}	—	—	—	—	46.6	0.17	8	38.5	54.7	—	MPC; JPL
2026 GO_{23}	—	—	—	—	73.6	0.42	27	42.4	104.7	—	MPC; JPL
2026 GO_{25}	—	—	—	—	42.4	0.16	19	35.6	49.1	—	MPC; JPL
2026 GO_{26}	—	—	—	—	43.6	0.17	24	36.4	50.8	—	MPC; JPL
2026 GO_{27}	—	—	—	—	102.4	0.64	18	36.6	168.2	—	MPC; JPL
2026 GO_{28}	—	—	—	—	44.7	0.18	30	36.8	52.6	—	MPC; JPL
2026 GP_{21}	—	—	—	—	79.7	0.61	16	31.0	128.4	—	MPC; JPL
2026 GP_{22}	—	—	—	—	46.4	0.18	33	38.0	54.9	—	MPC; JPL
2026 GP_{23}	—	—	—	—	57.2	0.37	18	35.9	78.4	—	MPC; JPL
2026 GP_{25}	—	—	—	—	57.2	0.38	28	35.5	78.8	—	MPC; JPL
2026 GP_{26}	—	—	—	—	43.4	0.16	23	36.6	50.1	—	MPC; JPL
2026 GP_{27}	—	—	—	—	39.7	0.23	10	30.7	48.8	—	MPC; JPL
2026 GP_{28}	—	—	—	—	41.7	0.14	28	36.0	47.4	—	MPC; JPL
2026 GQ_{21}	—	—	—	—	40.2	0.09	17	36.4	44.0	—	MPC; JPL
2026 GQ_{22}	—	—	—	—	39.1	0.03	33	37.9	40.3	—	MPC; JPL
2026 GQ_{23}	—	—	—	—	67.2	0.40	26	40.1	94.3	—	MPC; JPL
2026 GQ_{25}	—	—	—	—	53.7	0.29	23	38.0	69.5	—	MPC; JPL
2026 GQ_{26}	—	—	—	—	46.2	0.17	21	38.3	54.2	—	MPC; JPL
2026 GQ_{27}	—	—	—	—	44.1	0.24	13	33.6	54.5	—	MPC; JPL
2026 GQ_{28}	—	—	—	—	114.0	0.71	27	33.0	195.0	—	MPC; JPL
2026 GR_{21}	—	—	—	—	55.8	0.36	14	35.7	76.0	—	MPC; JPL
2026 GR_{22}	—	—	—	—	39.5	0.09	10	35.8	43.1	—	MPC; JPL
2026 GR_{23}	—	—	—	—	46.3	0.23	29	35.8	56.7	—	MPC; JPL
2026 GR_{25}	—	—	—	—	65.8	0.47	32	34.7	97.0	—	MPC; JPL
2026 GR_{26}	—	—	—	—	41.0	0.07	24	38.3	43.7	—	MPC; JPL
2026 GR_{27}	—	—	—	—	39.8	0.30	9	27.9	51.6	—	MPC; JPL
2026 GR_{28}	—	—	—	—	176.1	0.76	26	41.5	310.7	—	MPC; JPL
2026 GS_{20}	—	—	—	—	38.3	0.28	20	27.7	48.9	—	MPC; JPL
2026 GS_{21}	—	—	—	—	43.1	0.18	30	35.3	50.9	—	MPC; JPL
2026 GS_{22}	—	—	—	—	45.9	0.15	30	39.1	52.7	—	MPC; JPL
2026 GS_{23}	—	—	—	—	55.7	0.43	9	31.6	79.7	—	MPC; JPL
2026 GS_{25}	—	—	—	—	49.2	0.23	22	38.0	60.3	—	MPC; JPL
2026 GS_{26}	—	—	—	—	45.3	0.17	25	37.6	53.1	—	MPC; JPL
2026 GS_{27}	—	—	—	—	39.2	0.23	23	30.2	48.3	—	MPC; JPL
2026 GS_{28}	—	—	—	—	39.2	0.20	31	31.2	47.2	—	MPC; JPL
2026 GT_{20}	—	—	—	—	43.8	0.10	20	39.3	48.3	—	MPC; JPL
2026 GT_{21}	—	—	—	—	43.8	0.14	7	37.5	50.0	—	MPC; JPL
2026 GT_{22}	—	—	—	—	40.8	0.05	24	38.7	43.0	—	MPC; JPL
2026 GT_{23}	—	—	—	—	47.9	0.09	11	43.5	52.3	—	MPC; JPL
2026 GT_{25}	—	—	—	—	41.7	0.04	39	39.9	43.5	—	MPC; JPL
2026 GT_{26}	—	—	—	—	38.6	0.05	25	36.8	40.3	—	MPC; JPL
2026 GT_{27}	—	—	—	—	44.6	0.11	7	39.9	49.4	—	MPC; JPL
2026 GT_{28}	—	—	—	—	46.5	0.18	32	38.1	55.0	—	MPC; JPL
2026 GU_{20}	—	—	—	—	56.3	0.22	23	43.9	68.7	—	MPC; JPL
2026 GU_{21}	—	—	—	—	43.8	0.18	29	36.0	51.5	—	MPC; JPL
2026 GU_{22}	—	—	—	—	42.8	0.07	28	39.6	45.9	—	MPC; JPL
2026 GU_{23}	—	—	—	—	41.8	0.17	15	34.8	48.7	—	MPC; JPL
2026 GU_{25}	—	—	—	—	43.2	0.15	22	36.6	49.7	—	MPC; JPL
2026 GU_{26}	—	—	—	—	151.6	0.81	42	29.3	274.0	—	MPC; JPL
2026 GU_{27}	—	—	—	—	46.1	0.14	31	39.6	52.6	—	MPC; JPL
2026 GU_{28}	—	—	—	—	67.0	0.52	32	32.0	102.1	—	MPC; JPL
2026 GV_{20}	—	—	—	—	39.2	0.10	16	35.2	43.2	—	MPC; JPL
2026 GV_{21}	—	—	—	—	56.7	0.36	31	36.4	77.0	—	MPC; JPL
2026 GV_{22}	—	—	—	—	57.1	0.37	21	35.9	78.4	—	MPC; JPL
2026 GV_{23}	—	—	—	—	76.3	0.48	11	40.0	112.6	—	MPC; JPL
2026 GV_{25}	—	—	—	—	39.7	0.17	14	32.9	46.5	—	MPC; JPL
2026 GV_{26}	—	—	—	—	38.8	0.11	31	34.7	42.9	—	MPC; JPL
2026 GV_{27}	—	—	—	—	47.6	0.27	27	34.9	60.3	—	MPC; JPL
2026 GV_{28}	—	—	—	—	104.5	0.66	34	35.6	173.3	—	MPC; JPL
2026 GW_{20}	—	—	—	—	60.6	0.81	10	11.2	110.0	—	MPC; JPL
2026 GW_{21}	—	—	—	—	84.5	0.57	13	36.3	132.6	—	MPC; JPL
2026 GW_{22}	—	—	—	—	90.2	0.58	31	37.9	142.5	—	MPC; JPL
2026 GW_{23}	—	—	—	—	42.8	0.10	18	38.7	46.9	—	MPC; JPL
2026 GW_{25}	—	—	—	—	36.4	0.09	15	33.0	39.7	—	MPC; JPL
2026 GW_{26}	—	—	—	—	43.2	0.11	10	38.2	48.1	—	MPC; JPL
2026 GW_{27}	—	—	—	—	39.2	0.24	7	29.8	48.6	—	MPC; JPL
2026 GW_{28}	—	—	—	—	42.3	0.17	31	35.2	49.5	—	MPC; JPL
2026 GX_{21}	—	—	—	—	39.3	0.04	8	37.7	40.9	—	MPC; JPL
2026 GX_{22}	—	—	—	—	43.0	0.10	26	38.6	47.3	—	MPC; JPL
2026 GX_{23}	—	—	—	—	46.0	0.09	15	41.9	50.1	—	MPC; JPL
2026 GX_{25}	—	—	—	—	41.0	0.11	17	36.5	45.5	—	MPC; JPL
2026 GX_{26}	—	—	—	—	47.6	0.28	12	34.1	61.1	—	MPC; JPL
2026 GX_{27}	—	—	—	—	76.0	0.54	9	34.9	117.2	—	MPC; JPL
2026 GX_{28}	—	—	—	—	38.8	0.03	42	37.5	40.1	—	MPC; JPL
2026 GY_{20}	—	—	—	—	39.4	0.26	7	29.3	49.6	—	MPC; JPL
2026 GY_{21}	—	—	—	—	43.9	0.14	35	37.9	50.0	—	MPC; JPL
2026 GY_{22}	—	—	—	—	45.3	0.19	25	36.7	53.9	—	MPC; JPL
2026 GY_{23}	—	—	—	—	62.6	0.40	22	37.7	87.5	—	MPC; JPL
2026 GY_{24}	—	—	—	—	45.2	0.10	12	40.7	49.7	—	MPC; JPL
2026 GY_{25}	—	—	—	—	119.4	0.71	18	34.6	204.2	—	MPC; JPL
2026 GY_{26}	—	—	—	—	69.7	0.59	15	28.9	110.6	—	MPC; JPL
2026 GY_{27}	—	—	—	—	39.3	0.28	17	28.1	50.5	—	MPC; JPL
2026 GY_{28}	—	—	—	—	84.3	0.59	25	34.3	134.2	—	MPC; JPL
2026 GZ_{20}	—	—	—	—	40.6	0.34	14	26.8	54.4	—	MPC; JPL
2026 GZ_{21}	—	—	—	—	40.8	0.12	37	36.1	45.5	—	MPC; JPL
2026 GZ_{22}	—	—	—	—	55.5	0.30	25	38.7	72.3	—	MPC; JPL
2026 GZ_{23}	—	—	—	—	41.9	0.20	12	33.5	50.4	—	MPC; JPL
2026 GZ_{25}	—	—	—	—	46.7	0.18	21	38.5	54.8	—	MPC; JPL
2026 GZ_{26}	—	—	—	—	39.4	0.27	13	28.6	50.2	—	MPC; JPL
2026 GZ_{27}	—	—	—	—	51.8	0.31	34	36.0	67.6	—	MPC; JPL
2026 GZ_{28}	—	—	—	—	57.1	0.40	22	34.2	80.1	—	MPC; JPL
2026 HA_{17}	—	—	—	—	39.2	0.29	6	27.8	50.5	—	MPC; JPL
2026 HA_{18}	—	—	—	—	42.6	0.18	22	34.8	50.4	—	MPC; JPL
2026 HA_{19}	—	—	—	—	115.5	0.68	30	36.5	194.6	—	MPC; JPL
2026 HA_{20}	—	—	—	—	39.3	0.16	18	32.9	45.8	—	MPC; JPL
2026 HA_{21}	—	—	—	—	40.5	0.09	29	36.8	44.2	—	MPC; JPL
2026 HA_{22}	—	—	—	—	39.5	0.26	10	29.4	49.6	—	MPC; JPL
2026 HA_{23}	—	—	—	—	44.0	0.13	31	38.5	49.6	—	MPC; JPL
2026 HB_{17}	—	—	—	—	108.3	0.70	14	32.4	184.2	—	MPC; JPL
2026 HB_{18}	—	—	—	—	77.6	0.51	30	37.7	117.5	—	MPC; JPL
2026 HB_{19}	—	—	—	—	38.6	0.09	28	35.1	42.1	—	MPC; JPL
2026 HB_{20}	—	—	—	—	51.7	0.34	15	34.2	69.2	—	MPC; JPL
2026 HB_{21}	—	—	—	—	39.2	0.13	33	34.2	44.1	—	MPC; JPL
2026 HB_{22}	—	—	—	—	43.5	0.29	24	30.7	56.3	—	MPC; JPL
2026 HB_{23}	—	—	—	—	186.1	0.80	30	36.5	335.8	—	MPC; JPL
2026 HC_{17}	—	—	—	—	39.5	0.18	14	32.4	46.7	—	MPC; JPL
2026 HC_{18}	—	—	—	—	54.1	0.31	16	37.3	70.8	—	MPC; JPL
2026 HC_{19}	—	—	—	—	45.0	0.11	7	39.9	50.0	—	MPC; JPL
2026 HC_{20}	—	—	—	—	39.4	0.13	15	34.3	44.5	—	MPC; JPL
2026 HC_{21}	—	—	—	—	42.9	0.10	13	38.5	47.4	—	MPC; JPL
2026 HC_{22}	—	—	—	—	41.9	0.14	29	36.1	47.7	—	MPC; JPL
2026 HC_{23}	—	—	—	—	178.6	0.82	32	32.4	324.8	—	MPC; JPL
2026 HD_{18}	—	—	—	—	123.5	0.69	43	38.1	208.9	—	MPC; JPL
2026 HD_{19}	—	—	—	—	41.3	0.05	15	39.4	43.1	—	MPC; JPL
2026 HD_{20}	—	—	—	—	97.6	0.68	40	30.9	164.3	—	MPC; JPL
2026 HD_{21}	—	—	—	—	41.2	0.14	17	35.2	47.1	—	MPC; JPL
2026 HD_{22}	—	—	—	—	46.1	0.24	14	35.0	57.1	—	MPC; JPL
2026 HD_{23}	—	—	—	—	47.7	0.23	26	36.7	58.7	—	MPC; JPL
2026 HE_{17}	—	—	—	—	70.9	0.55	8	32.0	109.9	—	MPC; JPL
2026 HE_{18}	—	—	—	—	42.8	0.20	15	34.1	51.4	—	MPC; JPL
2026 HE_{19}	—	—	—	—	46.5	0.09	3	42.1	50.8	—	MPC; JPL
2026 HE_{20}	—	—	—	—	39.9	0.11	16	35.4	44.4	—	MPC; JPL
2026 HE_{21}	—	—	—	—	44.0	0.16	20	37.1	50.9	—	MPC; JPL
2026 HE_{22}	—	—	—	—	46.0	0.08	9	42.2	49.9	—	MPC; JPL
2026 HE_{23}	—	—	—	—	40.3	0.11	30	35.8	44.8	—	MPC; JPL
2026 HF_{17}	—	—	—	—	39.4	0.19	11	32.0	46.8	—	MPC; JPL
2026 HF_{18}	—	—	—	—	43.7	0.13	5	38.0	49.4	—	MPC; JPL
2026 HF_{19}	—	—	—	—	44.3	0.09	6	40.2	48.4	—	MPC; JPL
2026 HF_{20}	—	—	—	—	41.6	0.09	18	38.0	45.2	—	MPC; JPL
2026 HF_{21}	—	—	—	—	60.9	0.39	20	37.2	84.6	—	MPC; JPL
2026 HF_{22}	—	—	—	—	47.2	0.20	18	37.7	56.7	—	MPC; JPL
2026 HF_{23}	—	—	—	—	39.3	0.16	17	33.0	45.6	—	MPC; JPL
2026 HG_{17}	—	—	—	—	69.1	0.51	17	33.8	104.4	—	MPC; JPL
2026 HG_{18}	—	—	—	—	40.2	0.06	22	37.9	42.5	—	MPC; JPL
2026 HG_{19}	—	—	—	—	40.8	0.09	20	37.2	44.3	—	MPC; JPL
2026 HG_{20}	—	—	—	—	87.4	0.59	22	35.5	139.4	—	MPC; JPL
2026 HG_{21}	—	—	—	—	169.4	0.78	29	36.8	302.1	—	MPC; JPL
2026 HG_{22}	—	—	—	—	40.9	0.07	28	38.1	43.7	—	MPC; JPL
2026 HG_{23}	—	—	—	—	42.9	0.21	14	33.7	52.1	—	MPC; JPL
2026 HH_{17}	—	—	—	—	42.3	0.29	16	30.0	54.7	—	MPC; JPL
2026 HH_{18}	—	—	—	—	44.9	0.15	9	38.2	51.6	—	MPC; JPL
2026 HH_{19}	—	—	—	—	41.6	0.06	3	39.0	44.2	—	MPC; JPL
2026 HH_{20}	—	—	—	—	59.5	0.38	7	37.1	81.8	—	MPC; JPL
2026 HH_{21}	—	—	—	—	38.4	0.05	23	36.4	40.4	—	MPC; JPL
2026 HH_{22}	—	—	—	—	39.1	0.15	19	33.3	44.8	—	MPC; JPL
2026 HH_{23}	—	—	—	—	39.5	0.25	18	29.8	49.2	—	MPC; JPL
2026 HJ_{17}	—	—	—	—	43.6	0.28	15	31.5	55.7	—	MPC; JPL
2026 HJ_{18}	—	—	—	—	41.8	0.10	7	37.4	46.1	—	MPC; JPL
2026 HJ_{19}	—	—	—	—	43.4	0.07	12	40.4	46.4	—	MPC; JPL
2026 HJ_{20}	—	—	—	—	84.4	0.73	13	22.8	146.0	—	MPC; JPL
2026 HJ_{21}	—	—	—	—	43.3	0.13	26	37.6	48.9	—	MPC; JPL
2026 HJ_{22}	—	—	—	—	40.3	0.05	13	38.2	42.3	—	MPC; JPL
2026 HJ_{23}	—	—	—	—	83.0	0.58	16	34.9	131.0	—	MPC; JPL
2026 HK_{17}	—	—	—	—	41.2	0.26	33	30.3	52.1	—	MPC; JPL
2026 HK_{18}	—	—	—	—	45.0	0.14	9	38.7	51.2	—	MPC; JPL
2026 HK_{19}	—	—	—	—	43.5	0.16	18	36.5	50.4	—	MPC; JPL
2026 HK_{20}	—	—	—	—	92.5	0.52	37	44.7	140.2	—	MPC; JPL
2026 HK_{21}	—	—	—	—	39.5	0.19	17	32.0	47.0	—	MPC; JPL
2026 HK_{22}	—	—	—	—	40.3	0.05	19	38.3	42.4	—	MPC; JPL
2026 HK_{23}	—	—	—	—	38.7	0.26	17	28.8	48.6	—	MPC; JPL
2026 HL_{17}	—	—	—	—	74.1	0.56	25	32.3	115.9	—	MPC; JPL
2026 HL_{18}	—	—	—	—	54.1	0.33	28	36.4	71.8	—	MPC; JPL
2026 HL_{19}	—	—	—	—	42.7	0.06	5	40.1	45.4	—	MPC; JPL
2026 HL_{20}	—	—	—	—	46.4	0.39	8	28.2	64.7	—	MPC; JPL
2026 HL_{21}	—	—	—	—	40.9	0.04	28	39.1	42.8	—	MPC; JPL
2026 HL_{22}	—	—	—	—	39.0	0.13	34	34.1	43.9	—	MPC; JPL
2026 HL_{23}	—	—	—	—	40.2	0.10	32	36.4	44.1	—	MPC; JPL
2026 HM_{17}	—	—	—	—	55.3	0.37	21	35.1	75.5	—	MPC; JPL
2026 HM_{18}	—	—	—	—	54.6	0.30	5	38.2	71.0	—	MPC; JPL
2026 HM_{19}	—	—	—	—	90.5	0.61	18	35.4	145.6	—	MPC; JPL
2026 HM_{21}	—	—	—	—	46.1	0.01	14	45.5	46.7	—	MPC; JPL
2026 HM_{22}	—	—	—	—	47.6	0.35	21	30.9	64.2	—	MPC; JPL
2026 HN_{17}	—	—	—	—	60.3	0.41	11	35.7	84.9	—	MPC; JPL
2026 HN_{18}	—	—	—	—	48.5	0.20	8	39.0	57.9	—	MPC; JPL
2026 HN_{19}	—	—	—	—	44.9	0.02	6	43.8	46.0	—	MPC; JPL
2026 HN_{21}	—	—	—	—	51.5	0.28	10	36.8	66.1	—	MPC; JPL
2026 HN_{22}	—	—	—	—	72.9	0.61	8	28.7	117.2	—	MPC; JPL
2026 HN_{23}	—	—	—	—	36.7	0.13	23	32.1	41.4	—	MPC; JPL
2026 HO_{17}	—	—	—	—	182.4	0.80	7	35.8	328.9	—	MPC; JPL
2026 HO_{18}	—	—	—	—	41.4	0.06	17	38.8	44.0	—	MPC; JPL
2026 HO_{19}	—	—	—	—	38.9	0.20	16	31.1	46.8	—	MPC; JPL
2026 HO_{21}	—	—	—	—	39.2	0.19	6	31.7	46.7	—	MPC; JPL
2026 HO_{22}	—	—	—	—	39.7	0.34	16	26.2	53.1	—	MPC; JPL
2026 HO_{5}	—	—	—	—	49.6	0.64	40	17.9	81.2	—	MPC; JPL
2026 HP_{17}	—	—	—	—	43.8	0.20	20	35.1	52.4	—	MPC; JPL
2026 HP_{18}	—	—	—	—	41.3	0.03	15	39.9	42.7	—	MPC; JPL
2026 HP_{19}	—	—	—	—	273.2	0.84	26	44.6	501.7	—	MPC; JPL
2026 HP_{21}	—	—	—	—	46.0	0.17	29	38.2	53.9	—	MPC; JPL
2026 HP_{22}	—	—	—	—	39.3	0.27	36	28.8	49.7	—	MPC; JPL
2026 HQ_{17}	—	—	—	—	45.8	0.21	10	36.3	55.2	—	MPC; JPL
2026 HQ_{18}	—	—	—	—	48.5	0.17	6	40.5	56.6	—	MPC; JPL
2026 HQ_{19}	—	—	—	—	46.2	0.19	7	37.6	54.8	—	MPC; JPL
2026 HQ_{21}	—	—	—	—	39.5	0.29	11	28.2	50.7	—	MPC; JPL
2026 HQ_{22}	—	—	—	—	67.6	0.40	32	40.7	94.4	—	MPC; JPL
2026 HR_{17}	—	—	—	—	45.8	0.20	24	36.5	55.0	—	MPC; JPL
2026 HR_{18}	—	—	—	—	45.7	0.15	24	39.0	52.4	—	MPC; JPL
2026 HR_{19}	—	—	—	—	43.4	0.10	24	39.0	47.7	—	MPC; JPL
2026 HR_{21}	—	—	—	—	38.5	0.07	25	35.7	41.3	—	MPC; JPL
2026 HR_{22}	—	—	—	—	202.4	0.78	17	44.2	360.6	—	MPC; JPL
2026 HS_{17}	—	—	—	—	46.8	0.23	12	35.8	57.8	—	MPC; JPL
2026 HS_{18}	—	—	—	—	61.6	0.38	34	38.2	85.1	—	MPC; JPL
2026 HS_{19}	—	—	—	—	47.8	0.29	18	34.0	61.5	—	MPC; JPL
2026 HS_{21}	—	—	—	—	36.9	0.07	30	34.2	39.6	—	MPC; JPL
2026 HS_{22}	—	—	—	—	39.2	0.20	11	31.5	46.8	—	MPC; JPL
2026 HT_{17}	—	—	—	—	45.3	0.18	27	37.0	53.6	—	MPC; JPL
2026 HT_{18}	—	—	—	—	49.3	0.29	27	35.1	63.5	—	MPC; JPL
2026 HT_{19}	—	—	—	—	44.2	0.11	16	39.3	49.1	—	MPC; JPL
2026 HT_{21}	—	—	—	—	42.4	0.15	22	36.1	48.7	—	MPC; JPL
2026 HT_{22}	—	—	—	—	43.0	0.04	11	41.3	44.7	—	MPC; JPL
2026 HU_{17}	—	—	—	—	40.4	0.12	18	35.6	45.1	—	MPC; JPL
2026 HU_{18}	—	—	—	—	61.3	0.42	30	35.6	87.1	—	MPC; JPL
2026 HU_{19}	—	—	—	—	42.0	0.25	6	31.6	52.3	—	MPC; JPL
2026 HU_{21}	—	—	—	—	40.9	0.09	21	37.2	44.7	—	MPC; JPL
2026 HU_{22}	—	—	—	—	38.6	0.04	22	37.1	40.2	—	MPC; JPL
2026 HV_{17}	—	—	—	—	40.5	0.12	19	35.7	45.2	—	MPC; JPL
2026 HV_{18}	—	—	—	—	46.3	0.21	27	36.4	56.2	—	MPC; JPL
2026 HV_{19}	—	—	—	—	67.0	0.47	13	35.3	98.7	—	MPC; JPL
2026 HV_{21}	—	—	—	—	42.7	0.25	20	31.9	53.5	—	MPC; JPL
2026 HV_{22}	—	—	—	—	48.6	0.26	21	35.7	61.5	—	MPC; JPL
2026 HW_{17}	—	—	—	—	381.9	0.92	33	31.5	732.4	—	MPC; JPL
2026 HW_{18}	—	—	—	—	44.9	0.13	9	39.1	50.7	—	MPC; JPL
2026 HW_{19}	—	—	—	—	43.4	0.28	14	31.3	55.5	—	MPC; JPL
2026 HW_{20}	—	—	—	—	50.9	0.32	25	34.5	67.2	—	MPC; JPL
2026 HW_{21}	—	—	—	—	39.9	0.26	20	29.3	50.4	—	MPC; JPL
2026 HW_{22}	—	—	—	—	45.6	0.19	27	36.9	54.3	—	MPC; JPL
2026 HX_{17}	—	—	—	—	55.2	0.34	21	36.6	73.9	—	MPC; JPL
2026 HX_{18}	—	—	—	—	109.9	0.65	34	38.0	181.8	—	MPC; JPL
2026 HX_{19}	—	—	—	—	45.8	0.23	10	35.5	56.2	—	MPC; JPL
2026 HX_{20}	—	—	—	—	42.0	0.18	22	34.3	49.7	—	MPC; JPL
2026 HX_{21}	—	—	—	—	41.6	0.10	29	37.5	45.8	—	MPC; JPL
2026 HX_{22}	—	—	—	—	40.4	0.11	24	36.0	44.8	—	MPC; JPL
2026 HY_{17}	—	—	—	—	39.5	0.14	11	33.9	45.0	—	MPC; JPL
2026 HY_{18}	—	—	—	—	42.3	0.08	4	39.0	45.5	—	MPC; JPL
2026 HY_{19}	—	—	—	—	39.4	0.24	10	30.0	48.8	—	MPC; JPL
2026 HY_{20}	—	—	—	—	53.2	0.17	20	43.9	62.4	—	MPC; JPL
2026 HY_{21}	—	—	—	—	50.5	0.35	21	32.7	68.3	—	MPC; JPL
2026 HZ_{17}	—	—	—	—	44.7	0.16	15	37.7	51.7	—	MPC; JPL
2026 HZ_{18}	—	—	—	—	43.5	0.15	7	36.8	50.2	—	MPC; JPL
2026 HZ_{20}	—	—	—	—	51.5	0.19	51	41.9	61.0	—	MPC; JPL
2026 HZ_{21}	—	—	—	—	473.9	0.90	23	46.8	901.0	—	MPC; JPL
2026 HZ_{22}	—	—	—	—	57.8	0.39	36	35.1	80.5	—	MPC; JPL
2026 JA_{12}	—	—	—	—	57.3	0.43	5	32.5	82.1	—	MPC; JPL
2026 JB_{12}	—	—	—	—	42.8	0.15	9	36.5	49.0	—	MPC; JPL
2026 JC_{12}	—	—	—	—	44.1	0.16	13	37.1	51.1	—	MPC; JPL
2026 JD_{12}	—	—	—	—	59.0	0.37	18	37.4	80.6	—	MPC; JPL
2026 JE_{12}	—	—	—	—	40.9	0.04	49	39.2	42.7	—	MPC; JPL
2026 JF_{12}	—	—	—	—	46.4	0.22	22	36.2	56.7	—	MPC; JPL
2026 JG_{12}	—	—	—	—	43.6	0.04	10	42.1	45.2	—	MPC; JPL
2026 JH_{12}	—	—	—	—	66.7	0.35	27	43.3	90.1	—	MPC; JPL
2026 JJ_{12}	—	—	—	—	47.1	0.19	14	38.4	55.9	—	MPC; JPL
2026 JK_{12}	—	—	—	—	54.8	0.35	7	35.9	73.8	—	MPC; JPL
2026 JL_{12}	—	—	—	—	46.2	0.09	12	42.1	50.3	—	MPC; JPL
2026 JM_{12}	—	—	—	—	66.2	0.48	23	34.4	98.1	—	MPC; JPL
2026 JT_{13}	—	—	—	—	43.3	0.18	39	35.6	50.9	—	MPC; JPL
2026 JU_{13}	—	—	—	—	42.1	0.18	23	34.7	49.5	—	MPC; JPL
2026 JW_{11}	—	—	—	—	39.5	0.30	12	27.6	51.4	—	MPC; JPL
2026 JX_{11}	—	—	—	—	55.0	0.41	6	32.7	77.3	—	MPC; JPL
2026 JY_{11}	—	—	—	—	42.1	0.54	36	19.4	64.9	—	MPC; JPL
2026 JZ_{11}	—	—	—	—	49.1	0.29	13	34.7	63.5	—	MPC; JPL
2026 KA_{6}	—	—	—	—	38.9	0.20	13	31.3	46.5	—	MPC; JPL
2026 KB_{6}	—	—	—	—	56.2	0.35	32	36.4	75.9	—	MPC; JPL
2026 KO_{6}	—	—	—	—	39.1	0.13	8	33.9	44.3	—	MPC; JPL
2026 TO_{128}	—	—	—	—	39.6	0.24	4	30.2	49.1	—	MPC; JPL
2026 UX_{3}	—	—	—	—	51.4	0.95	63	2.5	100.3	—	MPC; JPL

back to top
