= List of minor planets: 525001–526000 =

The following is a partial list of minor planets, running from minor-planet number 525001 through 526000, inclusive. The primary data for this and other partial lists is based on JPL's "Small-Body Orbital Elements" and data available from the Minor Planet Center. Critical list information is also provided by the MPC, unless otherwise specified from Lowell Observatory. A detailed description of the table's columns and additional sources are given on the main page including a complete list of every page in this series, and a statistical break-up on the dynamical classification of minor planets.

Also see the summary list of all named bodies in numerical and alphabetical order, and the corresponding naming citations for the number range of this particular list. New namings may only be added to this list after official publication, as the preannouncement of names is condemned by the Working Group for Small Bodies Nomenclature of the International Astronomical Union.

| Near-Earth obj. | MBA (inner) | MBA (outer) | Centaur |
| Mars-crosser | MBA (middle) | Jupiter trojan | Trans-Neptunian obj. |
| Unclassified |

== 525001–525100 ==
| Designation | | | Discovery | | | Properties | | Ref |
| Permanent | Provisional | Named after | Date | Site | Discoverer(s) | Category | Diam. | Ref |
|---|---|---|---|---|---|---|---|---|
| 525001 | 2004 RH_{57} | — | September 8, 2004 | Socorro | LINEAR | · | 520 m | MPC · JPL |
| 525002 | 2004 RA_{65} | — | September 8, 2004 | Socorro | LINEAR | · | 1.6 km | MPC · JPL |
| 525003 | 2004 RY_{65} | — | September 8, 2004 | Socorro | LINEAR | · | 640 m | MPC · JPL |
| 525004 | 2004 RL_{70} | — | September 8, 2004 | Socorro | LINEAR | · | 990 m | MPC · JPL |
| 525005 | 2004 RW_{70} | — | September 8, 2004 | Socorro | LINEAR | · | 2.4 km | MPC · JPL |
| 525006 | 2004 RJ_{88} | — | September 7, 2004 | Palomar | NEAT | · | 1.4 km | MPC · JPL |
| 525007 | 2004 RD_{96} | — | September 8, 2004 | Socorro | LINEAR | · | 1.6 km | MPC · JPL |
| 525008 | 2004 RU_{97} | — | September 8, 2004 | Socorro | LINEAR | · | 1.2 km | MPC · JPL |
| 525009 | 2004 RK_{112} | — | August 26, 2004 | Socorro | LINEAR | · | 1.3 km | MPC · JPL |
| 525010 | 2004 RS_{118} | — | September 7, 2004 | Kitt Peak | Spacewatch | · | 1.3 km | MPC · JPL |
| 525011 | 2004 RD_{119} | — | September 7, 2004 | Kitt Peak | Spacewatch | HNS | 1.2 km | MPC · JPL |
| 525012 | 2004 RS_{120} | — | September 7, 2004 | Kitt Peak | Spacewatch | · | 1.6 km | MPC · JPL |
| 525013 | 2004 RZ_{124} | — | September 7, 2004 | Kitt Peak | Spacewatch | · | 1.4 km | MPC · JPL |
| 525014 | 2004 RH_{126} | — | September 7, 2004 | Kitt Peak | Spacewatch | · | 2.4 km | MPC · JPL |
| 525015 | 2004 RX_{126} | — | September 7, 2004 | Kitt Peak | Spacewatch | · | 1.3 km | MPC · JPL |
| 525016 | 2004 RT_{129} | — | September 7, 2004 | Kitt Peak | Spacewatch | · | 560 m | MPC · JPL |
| 525017 | 2004 RZ_{129} | — | September 7, 2004 | Kitt Peak | Spacewatch | · | 1.1 km | MPC · JPL |
| 525018 | 2004 RW_{133} | — | September 7, 2004 | Kitt Peak | Spacewatch | HNS | 1.1 km | MPC · JPL |
| 525019 | 2004 RH_{134} | — | September 7, 2004 | Kitt Peak | Spacewatch | · | 1.0 km | MPC · JPL |
| 525020 | 2004 RA_{142} | — | September 8, 2004 | Socorro | LINEAR | · | 1.9 km | MPC · JPL |
| 525021 | 2004 RK_{142} | — | September 8, 2004 | Socorro | LINEAR | · | 1.7 km | MPC · JPL |
| 525022 | 2004 RG_{146} | — | September 9, 2004 | Socorro | LINEAR | PHO | 830 m | MPC · JPL |
| 525023 | 2004 RQ_{149} | — | September 9, 2004 | Socorro | LINEAR | (18466) | 1.9 km | MPC · JPL |
| 525024 | 2004 RK_{151} | — | September 9, 2004 | Socorro | LINEAR | · | 1.4 km | MPC · JPL |
| 525025 | 2004 RC_{162} | — | August 21, 2004 | Catalina | CSS | · | 530 m | MPC · JPL |
| 525026 | 2004 RL_{164} | — | August 18, 2004 | Siding Spring | SSS | · | 1.3 km | MPC · JPL |
| 525027 | 2004 RH_{165} | — | August 20, 2004 | Catalina | CSS | PHO | 960 m | MPC · JPL |
| 525028 | 2004 RT_{166} | — | September 7, 2004 | Kitt Peak | Spacewatch | · | 1.0 km | MPC · JPL |
| 525029 | 2004 RU_{166} | — | September 7, 2004 | Kitt Peak | Spacewatch | EOS | 2.1 km | MPC · JPL |
| 525030 | 2004 RE_{167} | — | September 7, 2004 | Socorro | LINEAR | · | 1.4 km | MPC · JPL |
| 525031 | 2004 RP_{178} | — | September 10, 2004 | Socorro | LINEAR | · | 1.4 km | MPC · JPL |
| 525032 | 2004 RT_{186} | — | August 10, 2004 | Socorro | LINEAR | · | 2.3 km | MPC · JPL |
| 525033 | 2004 RN_{193} | — | September 10, 2004 | Socorro | LINEAR | · | 1.3 km | MPC · JPL |
| 525034 | 2004 RZ_{197} | — | August 19, 2004 | Socorro | LINEAR | · | 1.5 km | MPC · JPL |
| 525035 | 2004 RF_{204} | — | September 12, 2004 | Kitt Peak | Spacewatch | · | 2.8 km | MPC · JPL |
| 525036 | 2004 RU_{220} | — | September 11, 2004 | Socorro | LINEAR | · | 2.6 km | MPC · JPL |
| 525037 | 2004 RF_{223} | — | September 7, 2004 | Socorro | LINEAR | · | 1.5 km | MPC · JPL |
| 525038 | 2004 RV_{224} | — | September 9, 2004 | Socorro | LINEAR | (194) | 1.5 km | MPC · JPL |
| 525039 | 2004 RM_{229} | — | September 9, 2004 | Kitt Peak | Spacewatch | · | 1.6 km | MPC · JPL |
| 525040 | 2004 RE_{230} | — | May 1, 2003 | Kitt Peak | Spacewatch | · | 1.9 km | MPC · JPL |
| 525041 | 2004 RR_{234} | — | September 10, 2004 | Kitt Peak | Spacewatch | · | 1.2 km | MPC · JPL |
| 525042 | 2004 RD_{239} | — | September 10, 2004 | Kitt Peak | Spacewatch | · | 1.2 km | MPC · JPL |
| 525043 | 2004 RR_{240} | — | September 10, 2004 | Kitt Peak | Spacewatch | · | 2.4 km | MPC · JPL |
| 525044 | 2004 RQ_{244} | — | September 10, 2004 | Kitt Peak | Spacewatch | · | 640 m | MPC · JPL |
| 525045 | 2004 RB_{248} | — | September 7, 2004 | Socorro | LINEAR | PHO | 850 m | MPC · JPL |
| 525046 | 2004 RE_{251} | — | September 10, 2004 | Socorro | LINEAR | · | 1.4 km | MPC · JPL |
| 525047 | 2004 RJ_{253} | — | September 15, 2004 | Siding Spring | SSS | H | 580 m | MPC · JPL |
| 525048 | 2004 RQ_{256} | — | September 9, 2004 | Socorro | LINEAR | · | 1.5 km | MPC · JPL |
| 525049 | 2004 RO_{272} | — | September 11, 2004 | Kitt Peak | Spacewatch | · | 1.9 km | MPC · JPL |
| 525050 | 2004 RP_{275} | — | August 23, 2004 | Kitt Peak | Spacewatch | H | 480 m | MPC · JPL |
| 525051 | 2004 RU_{279} | — | September 15, 2004 | Kitt Peak | Spacewatch | · | 660 m | MPC · JPL |
| 525052 | 2004 RN_{280} | — | September 15, 2004 | Kitt Peak | Spacewatch | · | 560 m | MPC · JPL |
| 525053 | 2004 RP_{294} | — | September 11, 2004 | Kitt Peak | Spacewatch | (5) | 1.1 km | MPC · JPL |
| 525054 | 2004 RM_{297} | — | September 11, 2004 | Kitt Peak | Spacewatch | · | 520 m | MPC · JPL |
| 525055 | 2004 RR_{297} | — | September 11, 2004 | Kitt Peak | Spacewatch | · | 860 m | MPC · JPL |
| 525056 | 2004 RD_{304} | — | September 12, 2004 | Kitt Peak | Spacewatch | · | 1.7 km | MPC · JPL |
| 525057 | 2004 RV_{307} | — | September 13, 2004 | Socorro | LINEAR | PHO | 630 m | MPC · JPL |
| 525058 | 2004 RZ_{311} | — | September 15, 2004 | Kitt Peak | Spacewatch | · | 560 m | MPC · JPL |
| 525059 | 2004 RP_{317} | — | September 12, 2004 | Kitt Peak | Spacewatch | · | 2.0 km | MPC · JPL |
| 525060 | 2004 RR_{318} | — | September 12, 2004 | Kitt Peak | Spacewatch | · | 2.8 km | MPC · JPL |
| 525061 | 2004 RE_{319} | — | September 13, 2004 | Socorro | LINEAR | · | 900 m | MPC · JPL |
| 525062 | 2004 RF_{320} | — | September 13, 2004 | Socorro | LINEAR | · | 650 m | MPC · JPL |
| 525063 | 2004 RQ_{320} | — | September 13, 2004 | Socorro | LINEAR | · | 1.0 km | MPC · JPL |
| 525064 | 2004 RX_{320} | — | September 13, 2004 | Socorro | LINEAR | · | 1.7 km | MPC · JPL |
| 525065 | 2004 RN_{321} | — | September 13, 2004 | Socorro | LINEAR | · | 630 m | MPC · JPL |
| 525066 | 2004 RP_{330} | — | September 15, 2004 | Kitt Peak | Spacewatch | PAD | 1.6 km | MPC · JPL |
| 525067 | 2004 RS_{333} | — | September 15, 2004 | Anderson Mesa | LONEOS | · | 3.1 km | MPC · JPL |
| 525068 | 2004 RW_{334} | — | September 15, 2004 | Anderson Mesa | LONEOS | · | 3.1 km | MPC · JPL |
| 525069 | 2004 RP_{335} | — | September 15, 2004 | Kitt Peak | Spacewatch | · | 430 m | MPC · JPL |
| 525070 | 2004 RJ_{340} | — | September 11, 2004 | Kitt Peak | Spacewatch | · | 1.5 km | MPC · JPL |
| 525071 | 2004 RJ_{351} | — | September 11, 2004 | Kitt Peak | Spacewatch | · | 660 m | MPC · JPL |
| 525072 | 2004 RX_{352} | — | September 11, 2004 | Kitt Peak | Spacewatch | EUN | 1.0 km | MPC · JPL |
| 525073 | 2004 SM | — | September 16, 2004 | Socorro | LINEAR | PHO | 2.7 km | MPC · JPL |
| 525074 | 2004 SO_{6} | — | September 17, 2004 | Kitt Peak | Spacewatch | · | 1.2 km | MPC · JPL |
| 525075 | 2004 SQ_{7} | — | September 17, 2004 | Kitt Peak | Spacewatch | · | 720 m | MPC · JPL |
| 525076 | 2004 SS_{13} | — | September 17, 2004 | Socorro | LINEAR | · | 3.1 km | MPC · JPL |
| 525077 | 2004 SY_{13} | — | September 17, 2004 | Socorro | LINEAR | · | 660 m | MPC · JPL |
| 525078 | 2004 SK_{14} | — | September 17, 2004 | Anderson Mesa | LONEOS | · | 1.8 km | MPC · JPL |
| 525079 | 2004 SL_{15} | — | September 17, 2004 | Anderson Mesa | LONEOS | · | 1.3 km | MPC · JPL |
| 525080 | 2004 SS_{16} | — | September 17, 2004 | Anderson Mesa | LONEOS | ADE | 2.3 km | MPC · JPL |
| 525081 | 2004 SQ_{18} | — | September 18, 2004 | Socorro | LINEAR | H | 610 m | MPC · JPL |
| 525082 | 2004 SJ_{22} | — | October 23, 2009 | Mount Lemmon | Mount Lemmon Survey | · | 1.6 km | MPC · JPL |
| 525083 | 2004 SU_{24} | — | September 21, 2004 | Kitt Peak | Spacewatch | · | 610 m | MPC · JPL |
| 525084 | 2004 SJ_{26} | — | September 21, 2004 | Socorro | LINEAR | TIN | 1.2 km | MPC · JPL |
| 525085 | 2004 SA_{27} | — | September 16, 2004 | Kitt Peak | Spacewatch | · | 750 m | MPC · JPL |
| 525086 | 2004 SX_{28} | — | September 17, 2004 | Socorro | LINEAR | · | 1.5 km | MPC · JPL |
| 525087 | 2004 SQ_{31} | — | September 17, 2004 | Socorro | LINEAR | · | 1.4 km | MPC · JPL |
| 525088 | 2004 SA_{38} | — | September 7, 2004 | Kitt Peak | Spacewatch | · | 1.0 km | MPC · JPL |
| 525089 | 2004 SC_{38} | — | September 9, 2004 | Kitt Peak | Spacewatch | · | 2.7 km | MPC · JPL |
| 525090 | 2004 SL_{45} | — | September 18, 2004 | Socorro | LINEAR | H | 470 m | MPC · JPL |
| 525091 | 2004 SZ_{58} | — | August 26, 2004 | Siding Spring | SSS | · | 780 m | MPC · JPL |
| 525092 | 2004 SK_{60} | — | September 23, 2004 | Kitt Peak | Spacewatch | · | 1.3 km | MPC · JPL |
| 525093 | 2004 TX | — | September 22, 2004 | Socorro | LINEAR | · | 1.3 km | MPC · JPL |
| 525094 | 2004 TO_{3} | — | September 22, 2004 | Kitt Peak | Spacewatch | · | 460 m | MPC · JPL |
| 525095 | 2004 TX_{10} | — | October 8, 2004 | Socorro | LINEAR | · | 710 m | MPC · JPL |
| 525096 | 2004 TO_{16} | — | September 11, 2004 | Socorro | LINEAR | TIN | 1.0 km | MPC · JPL |
| 525097 | 2004 TX_{16} | — | October 10, 2004 | Socorro | LINEAR | H | 480 m | MPC · JPL |
| 525098 | 2004 TJ_{19} | — | October 13, 2004 | Anderson Mesa | LONEOS | · | 1.6 km | MPC · JPL |
| 525099 | 2004 TW_{23} | — | October 4, 2004 | Kitt Peak | Spacewatch | · | 1.4 km | MPC · JPL |
| 525100 | 2004 TM_{24} | — | October 4, 2004 | Kitt Peak | Spacewatch | · | 1.4 km | MPC · JPL |

== 525101–525200 ==
back to top

| Designation | | | Discovery | | | Properties | | Ref |
| Permanent | Provisional | Named after | Date | Site | Discoverer(s) | Category | Diam. | Ref |
|---|---|---|---|---|---|---|---|---|
| 525101 | 2004 TH_{40} | — | October 4, 2004 | Kitt Peak | Spacewatch | · | 1.8 km | MPC · JPL |
| 525102 | 2004 TS_{48} | — | October 4, 2004 | Kitt Peak | Spacewatch | · | 630 m | MPC · JPL |
| 525103 | 2004 TD_{50} | — | October 4, 2004 | Kitt Peak | Spacewatch | · | 970 m | MPC · JPL |
| 525104 | 2004 TU_{52} | — | October 4, 2004 | Kitt Peak | Spacewatch | DOR | 1.9 km | MPC · JPL |
| 525105 | 2004 TJ_{57} | — | September 24, 2004 | Kitt Peak | Spacewatch | · | 1.4 km | MPC · JPL |
| 525106 | 2004 TE_{59} | — | September 17, 2004 | Socorro | LINEAR | · | 2.6 km | MPC · JPL |
| 525107 | 2004 TM_{59} | — | October 5, 2004 | Kitt Peak | Spacewatch | · | 1.2 km | MPC · JPL |
| 525108 | 2004 TE_{61} | — | October 5, 2004 | Anderson Mesa | LONEOS | ADE | 1.8 km | MPC · JPL |
| 525109 | 2004 TS_{63} | — | October 5, 2004 | Kitt Peak | Spacewatch | · | 2.3 km | MPC · JPL |
| 525110 | 2004 TY_{65} | — | August 23, 2004 | Siding Spring | SSS | · | 660 m | MPC · JPL |
| 525111 | 2004 TW_{70} | — | October 6, 2004 | Kitt Peak | Spacewatch | · | 600 m | MPC · JPL |
| 525112 | 2004 TN_{74} | — | October 6, 2004 | Kitt Peak | Spacewatch | · | 740 m | MPC · JPL |
| 525113 | 2004 TN_{76} | — | October 7, 2004 | Socorro | LINEAR | · | 1.6 km | MPC · JPL |
| 525114 | 2004 TQ_{76} | — | October 7, 2004 | Socorro | LINEAR | · | 650 m | MPC · JPL |
| 525115 | 2004 TZ_{79} | — | October 5, 2004 | Kitt Peak | Spacewatch | · | 1.8 km | MPC · JPL |
| 525116 | 2004 TD_{82} | — | September 24, 2004 | Kitt Peak | Spacewatch | · | 530 m | MPC · JPL |
| 525117 | 2004 TM_{83} | — | October 5, 2004 | Kitt Peak | Spacewatch | · | 2.9 km | MPC · JPL |
| 525118 | 2004 TA_{91} | — | October 5, 2004 | Kitt Peak | Spacewatch | · | 2.9 km | MPC · JPL |
| 525119 | 2004 TH_{91} | — | September 17, 2004 | Kitt Peak | Spacewatch | AEO | 1 km | MPC · JPL |
| 525120 | 2004 TD_{92} | — | October 5, 2004 | Kitt Peak | Spacewatch | · | 2.0 km | MPC · JPL |
| 525121 | 2004 TF_{94} | — | September 17, 2004 | Kitt Peak | Spacewatch | · | 1.3 km | MPC · JPL |
| 525122 | 2004 TS_{95} | — | October 5, 2004 | Kitt Peak | Spacewatch | · | 520 m | MPC · JPL |
| 525123 | 2004 TZ_{95} | — | October 5, 2004 | Kitt Peak | Spacewatch | · | 460 m | MPC · JPL |
| 525124 | 2004 TM_{96} | — | October 5, 2004 | Kitt Peak | Spacewatch | · | 1.7 km | MPC · JPL |
| 525125 | 2004 TH_{100} | — | August 11, 2004 | Socorro | LINEAR | · | 1.3 km | MPC · JPL |
| 525126 | 2004 TA_{104} | — | October 7, 2004 | Kitt Peak | Spacewatch | THM | 2.1 km | MPC · JPL |
| 525127 | 2004 TX_{104} | — | October 7, 2004 | Kitt Peak | Spacewatch | · | 1.9 km | MPC · JPL |
| 525128 | 2004 TK_{105} | — | October 7, 2004 | Socorro | LINEAR | · | 1.4 km | MPC · JPL |
| 525129 | 2004 TT_{109} | — | October 7, 2004 | Anderson Mesa | LONEOS | · | 2.3 km | MPC · JPL |
| 525130 | 2004 TL_{111} | — | October 7, 2004 | Kitt Peak | Spacewatch | (5) | 1.2 km | MPC · JPL |
| 525131 | 2004 TX_{123} | — | October 7, 2004 | Anderson Mesa | LONEOS | · | 560 m | MPC · JPL |
| 525132 | 2004 TD_{128} | — | October 7, 2004 | Socorro | LINEAR | · | 600 m | MPC · JPL |
| 525133 | 2004 TL_{128} | — | September 9, 2004 | Socorro | LINEAR | (32418) | 1.6 km | MPC · JPL |
| 525134 | 2004 TZ_{134} | — | October 8, 2004 | Anderson Mesa | LONEOS | · | 650 m | MPC · JPL |
| 525135 | 2004 TT_{142} | — | September 9, 2004 | Kitt Peak | Spacewatch | · | 1.0 km | MPC · JPL |
| 525136 | 2004 TY_{143} | — | October 4, 2004 | Kitt Peak | Spacewatch | H | 500 m | MPC · JPL |
| 525137 | 2004 TY_{146} | — | October 6, 2004 | Kitt Peak | Spacewatch | · | 1.6 km | MPC · JPL |
| 525138 | 2004 TL_{148} | — | September 23, 2004 | Kitt Peak | Spacewatch | · | 1.3 km | MPC · JPL |
| 525139 | 2004 TM_{150} | — | September 23, 2004 | Kitt Peak | Spacewatch | EUN | 1.0 km | MPC · JPL |
| 525140 | 2004 TV_{151} | — | October 6, 2004 | Kitt Peak | Spacewatch | · | 1.8 km | MPC · JPL |
| 525141 | 2004 TD_{154} | — | September 9, 2004 | Kitt Peak | Spacewatch | THM | 3.1 km | MPC · JPL |
| 525142 | 2004 TT_{154} | — | September 10, 2004 | Kitt Peak | Spacewatch | · | 1.4 km | MPC · JPL |
| 525143 | 2004 TE_{155} | — | October 6, 2004 | Kitt Peak | Spacewatch | · | 2.1 km | MPC · JPL |
| 525144 | 2004 TB_{159} | — | October 6, 2004 | Kitt Peak | Spacewatch | · | 640 m | MPC · JPL |
| 525145 | 2004 TR_{159} | — | October 6, 2004 | Kitt Peak | Spacewatch | · | 1.2 km | MPC · JPL |
| 525146 | 2004 TY_{159} | — | October 6, 2004 | Kitt Peak | Spacewatch | · | 710 m | MPC · JPL |
| 525147 | 2004 TS_{162} | — | October 6, 2004 | Kitt Peak | Spacewatch | · | 420 m | MPC · JPL |
| 525148 | 2004 TH_{165} | — | October 7, 2004 | Kitt Peak | Spacewatch | (5) | 1.1 km | MPC · JPL |
| 525149 | 2004 TM_{165} | — | October 7, 2004 | Kitt Peak | Spacewatch | · | 1.8 km | MPC · JPL |
| 525150 | 2004 TX_{165} | — | October 7, 2004 | Kitt Peak | Spacewatch | · | 2.5 km | MPC · JPL |
| 525151 | 2004 TA_{167} | — | October 7, 2004 | Kitt Peak | Spacewatch | · | 1.1 km | MPC · JPL |
| 525152 | 2004 TC_{180} | — | October 7, 2004 | Kitt Peak | Spacewatch | · | 1.7 km | MPC · JPL |
| 525153 | 2004 TX_{182} | — | September 10, 2004 | Kitt Peak | Spacewatch | · | 660 m | MPC · JPL |
| 525154 | 2004 TX_{186} | — | October 7, 2004 | Kitt Peak | Spacewatch | · | 1.5 km | MPC · JPL |
| 525155 | 2004 TG_{187} | — | September 10, 2004 | Kitt Peak | Spacewatch | V | 550 m | MPC · JPL |
| 525156 | 2004 TR_{187} | — | October 7, 2004 | Kitt Peak | Spacewatch | DOR | 1.9 km | MPC · JPL |
| 525157 | 2004 TV_{188} | — | October 7, 2004 | Kitt Peak | Spacewatch | · | 1.1 km | MPC · JPL |
| 525158 | 2004 TO_{191} | — | October 7, 2004 | Kitt Peak | Spacewatch | · | 1.2 km | MPC · JPL |
| 525159 | 2004 TL_{192} | — | October 7, 2004 | Kitt Peak | Spacewatch | · | 530 m | MPC · JPL |
| 525160 | 2004 TV_{192} | — | October 7, 2004 | Kitt Peak | Spacewatch | · | 1.2 km | MPC · JPL |
| 525161 | 2004 TT_{194} | — | October 7, 2004 | Kitt Peak | Spacewatch | · | 2.5 km | MPC · JPL |
| 525162 | 2004 TG_{198} | — | October 7, 2004 | Kitt Peak | Spacewatch | · | 1.6 km | MPC · JPL |
| 525163 | 2004 TT_{198} | — | October 7, 2004 | Kitt Peak | Spacewatch | GEF | 870 m | MPC · JPL |
| 525164 | 2004 TC_{201} | — | October 7, 2004 | Kitt Peak | Spacewatch | · | 630 m | MPC · JPL |
| 525165 | 2004 TY_{202} | — | October 7, 2004 | Kitt Peak | Spacewatch | BAP | 700 m | MPC · JPL |
| 525166 | 2004 TZ_{209} | — | October 8, 2004 | Kitt Peak | Spacewatch | GEF | 1.1 km | MPC · JPL |
| 525167 | 2004 TH_{213} | — | October 8, 2004 | Kitt Peak | Spacewatch | · | 1.7 km | MPC · JPL |
| 525168 | 2004 TC_{215} | — | October 9, 2004 | Kitt Peak | Spacewatch | · | 3.4 km | MPC · JPL |
| 525169 | 2004 TZ_{215} | — | October 9, 2004 | Socorro | LINEAR | PHO | 2.1 km | MPC · JPL |
| 525170 | 2004 TK_{217} | — | October 5, 2004 | Kitt Peak | Spacewatch | CYB | 4.6 km | MPC · JPL |
| 525171 | 2004 TB_{218} | — | October 5, 2004 | Kitt Peak | Spacewatch | · | 540 m | MPC · JPL |
| 525172 | 2004 TY_{219} | — | October 5, 2004 | Kitt Peak | Spacewatch | · | 680 m | MPC · JPL |
| 525173 | 2004 TD_{220} | — | September 7, 2004 | Kitt Peak | Spacewatch | URS | 3.3 km | MPC · JPL |
| 525174 | 2004 TP_{224} | — | March 10, 2003 | Anderson Mesa | LONEOS | · | 880 m | MPC · JPL |
| 525175 | 2004 TQ_{225} | — | September 29, 1995 | Kitt Peak | Spacewatch | AEO | 990 m | MPC · JPL |
| 525176 | 2004 TX_{228} | — | October 8, 2004 | Kitt Peak | Spacewatch | · | 1.6 km | MPC · JPL |
| 525177 | 2004 TN_{234} | — | October 8, 2004 | Kitt Peak | Spacewatch | · | 1.6 km | MPC · JPL |
| 525178 | 2004 TB_{239} | — | November 1, 1997 | Kitt Peak | Spacewatch | (2076) | 680 m | MPC · JPL |
| 525179 | 2004 TX_{244} | — | October 7, 2004 | Kitt Peak | Spacewatch | · | 1.5 km | MPC · JPL |
| 525180 | 2004 TJ_{245} | — | October 7, 2004 | Kitt Peak | Spacewatch | · | 1.8 km | MPC · JPL |
| 525181 | 2004 TW_{246} | — | April 8, 2002 | Kitt Peak | Spacewatch | EUN | 1.2 km | MPC · JPL |
| 525182 | 2004 TF_{248} | — | October 7, 2004 | Kitt Peak | Spacewatch | MAR | 1.2 km | MPC · JPL |
| 525183 | 2004 TS_{248} | — | October 7, 2004 | Kitt Peak | Spacewatch | · | 830 m | MPC · JPL |
| 525184 | 2004 TU_{249} | — | October 7, 2004 | Kitt Peak | Spacewatch | · | 580 m | MPC · JPL |
| 525185 | 2004 TB_{250} | — | October 7, 2004 | Kitt Peak | Spacewatch | · | 1.8 km | MPC · JPL |
| 525186 | 2004 TR_{250} | — | October 9, 2004 | Kitt Peak | Spacewatch | · | 3.3 km | MPC · JPL |
| 525187 | 2004 TT_{251} | — | October 9, 2004 | Kitt Peak | Spacewatch | · | 1.9 km | MPC · JPL |
| 525188 | 2004 TR_{254} | — | October 9, 2004 | Kitt Peak | Spacewatch | · | 1.6 km | MPC · JPL |
| 525189 | 2004 TS_{262} | — | October 9, 2004 | Socorro | LINEAR | · | 1.7 km | MPC · JPL |
| 525190 | 2004 TJ_{264} | — | October 9, 2004 | Kitt Peak | Spacewatch | · | 2.0 km | MPC · JPL |
| 525191 | 2004 TL_{265} | — | October 9, 2004 | Kitt Peak | Spacewatch | WIT | 850 m | MPC · JPL |
| 525192 | 2004 TO_{266} | — | October 9, 2004 | Kitt Peak | Spacewatch | · | 600 m | MPC · JPL |
| 525193 | 2004 TG_{267} | — | October 9, 2004 | Kitt Peak | Spacewatch | · | 1.7 km | MPC · JPL |
| 525194 | 2004 TE_{270} | — | October 9, 2004 | Kitt Peak | Spacewatch | · | 1.4 km | MPC · JPL |
| 525195 | 2004 TT_{271} | — | October 9, 2004 | Kitt Peak | Spacewatch | · | 4.0 km | MPC · JPL |
| 525196 | 2004 TD_{274} | — | October 9, 2004 | Kitt Peak | Spacewatch | · | 790 m | MPC · JPL |
| 525197 | 2004 TN_{275} | — | October 9, 2004 | Kitt Peak | Spacewatch | · | 1.6 km | MPC · JPL |
| 525198 | 2004 TG_{284} | — | October 8, 2004 | Kitt Peak | Spacewatch | · | 1.6 km | MPC · JPL |
| 525199 | 2004 TF_{294} | — | October 10, 2004 | Kitt Peak | Spacewatch | NYS | 660 m | MPC · JPL |
| 525200 | 2004 TJ_{297} | — | October 11, 2004 | Kitt Peak | Spacewatch | · | 610 m | MPC · JPL |

== 525201–525300 ==
back to top

| Designation | | | Discovery | | | Properties | | Ref |
| Permanent | Provisional | Named after | Date | Site | Discoverer(s) | Category | Diam. | Ref |
|---|---|---|---|---|---|---|---|---|
| 525201 | 2004 TQ_{304} | — | October 10, 2004 | Kitt Peak | Spacewatch | · | 1.4 km | MPC · JPL |
| 525202 | 2004 TQ_{314} | — | October 11, 2004 | Kitt Peak | Spacewatch | · | 1.4 km | MPC · JPL |
| 525203 | 2004 TC_{318} | — | October 11, 2004 | Kitt Peak | Spacewatch | · | 1.4 km | MPC · JPL |
| 525204 | 2004 TP_{318} | — | October 11, 2004 | Kitt Peak | Spacewatch | HOF | 1.9 km | MPC · JPL |
| 525205 | 2004 TB_{324} | — | October 11, 2004 | Kitt Peak | Spacewatch | · | 1.8 km | MPC · JPL |
| 525206 | 2004 TU_{324} | — | October 12, 2004 | Anderson Mesa | LONEOS | · | 760 m | MPC · JPL |
| 525207 | 2004 TV_{329} | — | September 24, 2004 | Kitt Peak | Spacewatch | HNS | 920 m | MPC · JPL |
| 525208 | 2004 TL_{330} | — | September 17, 2004 | Kitt Peak | Spacewatch | · | 2.0 km | MPC · JPL |
| 525209 | 2004 TG_{331} | — | October 9, 2004 | Kitt Peak | Spacewatch | KOR | 1.4 km | MPC · JPL |
| 525210 | 2004 TD_{337} | — | October 12, 2004 | Kitt Peak | Spacewatch | · | 1.6 km | MPC · JPL |
| 525211 | 2004 TO_{337} | — | October 12, 2004 | Kitt Peak | Spacewatch | · | 2.2 km | MPC · JPL |
| 525212 | 2004 TV_{337} | — | October 12, 2004 | Kitt Peak | Spacewatch | · | 700 m | MPC · JPL |
| 525213 | 2004 TP_{338} | — | September 25, 1995 | Kitt Peak | Spacewatch | · | 1.6 km | MPC · JPL |
| 525214 | 2004 TW_{339} | — | October 5, 2004 | Kitt Peak | Spacewatch | · | 1.1 km | MPC · JPL |
| 525215 | 2004 TD_{340} | — | October 13, 2004 | Kitt Peak | Spacewatch | EUN | 1.4 km | MPC · JPL |
| 525216 | 2004 TC_{343} | — | October 13, 2004 | Kitt Peak | Spacewatch | H | 460 m | MPC · JPL |
| 525217 | 2004 TK_{345} | — | October 8, 2004 | Siding Spring | SSS | · | 750 m | MPC · JPL |
| 525218 | 2004 TR_{348} | — | October 7, 2004 | Kitt Peak | Spacewatch | · | 1.9 km | MPC · JPL |
| 525219 | 2004 TO_{351} | — | October 10, 2004 | Kitt Peak | Spacewatch | · | 1.0 km | MPC · JPL |
| 525220 | 2004 TK_{356} | — | August 23, 2004 | Siding Spring | SSS | · | 1.6 km | MPC · JPL |
| 525221 | 2004 TD_{359} | — | October 7, 2004 | Kitt Peak | Spacewatch | · | 2.8 km | MPC · JPL |
| 525222 | 2004 TH_{365} | — | October 5, 2004 | Kitt Peak | Spacewatch | MAR | 830 m | MPC · JPL |
| 525223 | 2004 TB_{367} | — | October 4, 2004 | Kitt Peak | Spacewatch | · | 700 m | MPC · JPL |
| 525224 | 2004 TP_{368} | — | October 4, 2004 | Kitt Peak | Spacewatch | · | 1.5 km | MPC · JPL |
| 525225 | 2004 TZ_{370} | — | October 10, 2004 | Kitt Peak | Spacewatch | · | 1.2 km | MPC · JPL |
| 525226 | 2004 TT_{371} | — | October 15, 2004 | Kitt Peak | Spacewatch | · | 2.0 km | MPC · JPL |
| 525227 | 2004 TX_{371} | — | October 15, 2004 | Mount Lemmon | Mount Lemmon Survey | H | 350 m | MPC · JPL |
| 525228 | 2004 UN_{1} | — | October 4, 2004 | Kitt Peak | Spacewatch | · | 610 m | MPC · JPL |
| 525229 | 2004 UU_{1} | — | October 23, 2004 | Socorro | LINEAR | APO · PHA | 210 m | MPC · JPL |
| 525230 | 2004 UA_{7} | — | October 21, 2004 | Socorro | LINEAR | · | 2.6 km | MPC · JPL |
| 525231 | 2004 VB | — | November 1, 2004 | Anderson Mesa | LONEOS | APO · PHA | 240 m | MPC · JPL |
| 525232 | 2004 VM_{10} | — | October 8, 2004 | Anderson Mesa | LONEOS | PHO | 2.8 km | MPC · JPL |
| 525233 | 2004 VA_{11} | — | November 3, 2004 | Catalina | CSS | HNS | 1.6 km | MPC · JPL |
| 525234 | 2004 VB_{17} | — | November 7, 2004 | Socorro | LINEAR | AMO | 410 m | MPC · JPL |
| 525235 | 2004 VB_{18} | — | October 4, 2004 | Kitt Peak | Spacewatch | · | 1.7 km | MPC · JPL |
| 525236 | 2004 VF_{30} | — | October 10, 2004 | Kitt Peak | Spacewatch | · | 690 m | MPC · JPL |
| 525237 | 2004 VN_{30} | — | October 23, 2004 | Kitt Peak | Spacewatch | · | 720 m | MPC · JPL |
| 525238 | 2004 VV_{30} | — | October 10, 2004 | Kitt Peak | Spacewatch | · | 2.4 km | MPC · JPL |
| 525239 | 2004 VK_{31} | — | November 3, 2004 | Kitt Peak | Spacewatch | · | 770 m | MPC · JPL |
| 525240 | 2004 VO_{31} | — | November 3, 2004 | Kitt Peak | Spacewatch | GEF | 1.5 km | MPC · JPL |
| 525241 | 2004 VH_{32} | — | November 3, 2004 | Kitt Peak | Spacewatch | · | 2.8 km | MPC · JPL |
| 525242 | 2004 VP_{34} | — | October 23, 2004 | Kitt Peak | Spacewatch | · | 710 m | MPC · JPL |
| 525243 | 2004 VL_{35} | — | October 23, 2004 | Kitt Peak | Spacewatch | · | 510 m | MPC · JPL |
| 525244 | 2004 VN_{35} | — | November 3, 2004 | Kitt Peak | Spacewatch | · | 1.6 km | MPC · JPL |
| 525245 | 2004 VD_{36} | — | November 4, 2004 | Kitt Peak | Spacewatch | · | 1.5 km | MPC · JPL |
| 525246 | 2004 VR_{38} | — | November 4, 2004 | Kitt Peak | Spacewatch | · | 1.2 km | MPC · JPL |
| 525247 | 2004 VS_{42} | — | November 4, 2004 | Kitt Peak | Spacewatch | ADE | 1.9 km | MPC · JPL |
| 525248 | 2004 VB_{43} | — | November 4, 2004 | Kitt Peak | Spacewatch | AGN | 1.2 km | MPC · JPL |
| 525249 | 2004 VH_{43} | — | November 4, 2004 | Kitt Peak | Spacewatch | · | 1.4 km | MPC · JPL |
| 525250 | 2004 VC_{44} | — | November 4, 2004 | Kitt Peak | Spacewatch | · | 640 m | MPC · JPL |
| 525251 | 2004 VG_{46} | — | November 4, 2004 | Kitt Peak | Spacewatch | HNS | 990 m | MPC · JPL |
| 525252 | 2004 VF_{48} | — | November 4, 2004 | Kitt Peak | Spacewatch | · | 740 m | MPC · JPL |
| 525253 | 2004 VM_{51} | — | November 4, 2004 | Kitt Peak | Spacewatch | · | 610 m | MPC · JPL |
| 525254 | 2004 VR_{51} | — | November 4, 2004 | Kitt Peak | Spacewatch | · | 1.5 km | MPC · JPL |
| 525255 | 2004 VO_{56} | — | November 4, 2004 | Kitt Peak | Spacewatch | · | 1.5 km | MPC · JPL |
| 525256 | 2004 VF_{69} | — | November 10, 2004 | Kitt Peak | Spacewatch | KOR | 1.6 km | MPC · JPL |
| 525257 | 2004 VS_{75} | — | November 9, 2004 | Kitt Peak | M. W. Buie | res · 5:9 | 160 km | MPC · JPL |
| 525258 | 2004 VT_{75} | — | November 9, 2004 | Kitt Peak | M. W. Buie | plutino | 266 km | MPC · JPL |
| 525259 | 2004 VX_{78} | — | November 3, 2004 | Kitt Peak | Spacewatch | · | 1.5 km | MPC · JPL |
| 525260 | 2004 VD_{80} | — | October 13, 2004 | Kitt Peak | Spacewatch | · | 1.8 km | MPC · JPL |
| 525261 | 2004 VP_{85} | — | November 10, 2004 | Kitt Peak | Spacewatch | · | 2.5 km | MPC · JPL |
| 525262 | 2004 VA_{89} | — | November 9, 2004 | Catalina | CSS | · | 2.1 km | MPC · JPL |
| 525263 | 2004 VE_{89} | — | November 11, 2004 | Kitt Peak | Spacewatch | H | 490 m | MPC · JPL |
| 525264 | 2004 VL_{130} | — | November 4, 2004 | Kitt Peak | Spacewatch | · | 2.8 km | MPC · JPL |
| 525265 | 2004 VT_{131} | — | October 15, 2004 | Mount Lemmon | Mount Lemmon Survey | · | 640 m | MPC · JPL |
| 525266 | 2004 WF_{4} | — | November 17, 2004 | Campo Imperatore | CINEOS | · | 1.4 km | MPC · JPL |
| 525267 | 2004 XC_{6} | — | December 9, 2004 | Kitt Peak | Spacewatch | PHO | 870 m | MPC · JPL |
| 525268 | 2004 XL_{14} | — | December 10, 2004 | Catalina | CSS | ATE · PHA | 180 m | MPC · JPL |
| 525269 | 2004 XH_{33} | — | December 10, 2004 | Socorro | LINEAR | · | 940 m | MPC · JPL |
| 525270 | 2004 XX_{34} | — | December 11, 2004 | Kitt Peak | Spacewatch | · | 2.4 km | MPC · JPL |
| 525271 | 2004 XK_{38} | — | December 7, 2004 | Socorro | LINEAR | EUP | 4.6 km | MPC · JPL |
| 525272 | 2004 XS_{43} | — | December 11, 2004 | Kitt Peak | Spacewatch | · | 2.2 km | MPC · JPL |
| 525273 | 2004 XZ_{43} | — | December 11, 2004 | Campo Imperatore | CINEOS | · | 750 m | MPC · JPL |
| 525274 | 2004 XV_{49} | — | December 10, 2004 | Kitt Peak | Spacewatch | H | 540 m | MPC · JPL |
| 525275 | 2004 XA_{53} | — | December 10, 2004 | Kitt Peak | Spacewatch | · | 1.8 km | MPC · JPL |
| 525276 | 2004 XV_{53} | — | December 10, 2004 | Kitt Peak | Spacewatch | · | 850 m | MPC · JPL |
| 525277 | 2004 XG_{54} | — | December 10, 2004 | Kitt Peak | Spacewatch | · | 750 m | MPC · JPL |
| 525278 | 2004 XT_{54} | — | December 2, 2004 | Kitt Peak | Spacewatch | · | 2.0 km | MPC · JPL |
| 525279 | 2004 XV_{61} | — | December 10, 2004 | Kitt Peak | Spacewatch | WIT | 1.2 km | MPC · JPL |
| 525280 | 2004 XG_{69} | — | December 9, 2004 | Kitt Peak | Spacewatch | · | 2.6 km | MPC · JPL |
| 525281 | 2004 XB_{72} | — | December 13, 2004 | Campo Imperatore | CINEOS | V | 650 m | MPC · JPL |
| 525282 | 2004 XR_{72} | — | November 10, 2004 | Kitt Peak | Spacewatch | · | 1.0 km | MPC · JPL |
| 525283 | 2004 XP_{73} | — | November 19, 2004 | Socorro | LINEAR | PHO | 950 m | MPC · JPL |
| 525284 | 2004 XH_{77} | — | November 10, 2004 | Kitt Peak | Spacewatch | · | 1.6 km | MPC · JPL |
| 525285 | 2004 XT_{79} | — | December 10, 2004 | Socorro | LINEAR | · | 2.0 km | MPC · JPL |
| 525286 | 2004 XZ_{79} | — | December 10, 2004 | Socorro | LINEAR | EUN | 1.2 km | MPC · JPL |
| 525287 | 2004 XA_{82} | — | November 11, 2004 | Kitt Peak | Spacewatch | · | 1.8 km | MPC · JPL |
| 525288 | 2004 XH_{83} | — | December 10, 2004 | Socorro | LINEAR | DOR | 2.4 km | MPC · JPL |
| 525289 | 2004 XO_{84} | — | November 11, 2004 | Kitt Peak | Spacewatch | EUN | 3.7 km | MPC · JPL |
| 525290 | 2004 XM_{89} | — | November 20, 2004 | Kitt Peak | Spacewatch | · | 500 m | MPC · JPL |
| 525291 | 2004 XK_{90} | — | December 11, 2004 | Kitt Peak | Spacewatch | · | 600 m | MPC · JPL |
| 525292 | 2004 XL_{91} | — | December 11, 2004 | Kitt Peak | Spacewatch | · | 1.9 km | MPC · JPL |
| 525293 | 2004 XD_{96} | — | December 11, 2004 | Kitt Peak | Spacewatch | · | 1.2 km | MPC · JPL |
| 525294 | 2004 XB_{97} | — | December 11, 2004 | Kitt Peak | Spacewatch | GEF | 1.4 km | MPC · JPL |
| 525295 | 2004 XF_{97} | — | December 11, 2004 | Kitt Peak | Spacewatch | · | 2.1 km | MPC · JPL |
| 525296 | 2004 XL_{104} | — | December 10, 2004 | Socorro | LINEAR | · | 2.6 km | MPC · JPL |
| 525297 | 2004 XN_{115} | — | December 11, 2004 | Kitt Peak | Spacewatch | · | 1.2 km | MPC · JPL |
| 525298 | 2004 XL_{118} | — | December 12, 2004 | Kitt Peak | Spacewatch | · | 700 m | MPC · JPL |
| 525299 | 2004 XZ_{133} | — | December 15, 2004 | Socorro | LINEAR | · | 1.7 km | MPC · JPL |
| 525300 | 2004 XZ_{139} | — | December 13, 2004 | Kitt Peak | Spacewatch | HNS | 1.3 km | MPC · JPL |

== 525301–525400 ==
back to top

| Designation | | | Discovery | | | Properties | | Ref |
| Permanent | Provisional | Named after | Date | Site | Discoverer(s) | Category | Diam. | Ref |
|---|---|---|---|---|---|---|---|---|
| 525301 | 2004 XF_{144} | — | December 7, 2004 | Socorro | LINEAR | PHO | 2.1 km | MPC · JPL |
| 525302 | 2004 XO_{149} | — | December 15, 2004 | Kitt Peak | Spacewatch | · | 1.8 km | MPC · JPL |
| 525303 | 2004 XQ_{151} | — | November 20, 2004 | Kitt Peak | Spacewatch | · | 660 m | MPC · JPL |
| 525304 | 2004 XT_{151} | — | November 20, 2004 | Kitt Peak | Spacewatch | · | 640 m | MPC · JPL |
| 525305 | 2004 XE_{153} | — | December 3, 2004 | Kitt Peak | Spacewatch | · | 1.8 km | MPC · JPL |
| 525306 | 2004 XT_{154} | — | December 15, 2004 | Kitt Peak | Spacewatch | · | 2.2 km | MPC · JPL |
| 525307 | 2004 XD_{159} | — | December 14, 2004 | Kitt Peak | Spacewatch | · | 2.2 km | MPC · JPL |
| 525308 | 2004 XM_{161} | — | December 15, 2004 | Kitt Peak | Spacewatch | · | 750 m | MPC · JPL |
| 525309 | 2004 XD_{171} | — | December 9, 2004 | Kitt Peak | Spacewatch | BRA | 1.5 km | MPC · JPL |
| 525310 | 2004 XW_{172} | — | December 10, 2004 | Kitt Peak | Spacewatch | · | 3.4 km | MPC · JPL |
| 525311 | 2004 XV_{174} | — | December 11, 2004 | Kitt Peak | Spacewatch | · | 3.4 km | MPC · JPL |
| 525312 | 2004 XP_{175} | — | December 11, 2004 | Kitt Peak | Spacewatch | · | 1.7 km | MPC · JPL |
| 525313 | 2004 XX_{175} | — | September 18, 2003 | Palomar | NEAT | · | 2.1 km | MPC · JPL |
| 525314 | 2004 XO_{177} | — | December 11, 2004 | Campo Imperatore | CINEOS | · | 920 m | MPC · JPL |
| 525315 | 2004 XR_{178} | — | December 13, 2004 | Campo Imperatore | CINEOS | · | 2.5 km | MPC · JPL |
| 525316 | 2004 XM_{181} | — | December 15, 2004 | Socorro | LINEAR | H | 490 m | MPC · JPL |
| 525317 | 2004 XU_{182} | — | March 28, 1995 | Kitt Peak | Spacewatch | · | 950 m | MPC · JPL |
| 525318 | 2004 XZ_{192} | — | December 15, 2004 | Kitt Peak | Spacewatch | · | 2.3 km | MPC · JPL |
| 525319 | 2004 YU_{5} | — | December 20, 2004 | Socorro | LINEAR | AMO | 550 m | MPC · JPL |
| 525320 | 2004 YN_{9} | — | December 19, 2004 | Mount Lemmon | Mount Lemmon Survey | · | 600 m | MPC · JPL |
| 525321 | 2004 YW_{9} | — | December 19, 2004 | Mount Lemmon | Mount Lemmon Survey | · | 1.9 km | MPC · JPL |
| 525322 | 2004 YA_{15} | — | December 19, 2004 | Mount Lemmon | Mount Lemmon Survey | · | 1.3 km | MPC · JPL |
| 525323 | 2004 YJ_{15} | — | December 19, 2004 | Mount Lemmon | Mount Lemmon Survey | · | 1.5 km | MPC · JPL |
| 525324 | 2004 YC_{16} | — | December 18, 2004 | Mount Lemmon | Mount Lemmon Survey | · | 1.3 km | MPC · JPL |
| 525325 | 2004 YS_{16} | — | December 19, 2004 | Mount Lemmon | Mount Lemmon Survey | · | 1.6 km | MPC · JPL |
| 525326 | 2004 YZ_{18} | — | December 19, 2004 | Mount Lemmon | Mount Lemmon Survey | · | 780 m | MPC · JPL |
| 525327 | 2004 YR_{24} | — | December 16, 2004 | Kitt Peak | Spacewatch | · | 720 m | MPC · JPL |
| 525328 | 2004 YX_{24} | — | December 18, 2004 | Mount Lemmon | Mount Lemmon Survey | · | 2.0 km | MPC · JPL |
| 525329 | 2004 YR_{27} | — | December 16, 2004 | Socorro | LINEAR | · | 3.5 km | MPC · JPL |
| 525330 | 2004 YW_{36} | — | September 6, 2008 | Mount Lemmon | Mount Lemmon Survey | KOR | 1.4 km | MPC · JPL |
| 525331 | 2004 YQ_{37} | — | December 19, 2004 | Mount Lemmon | Mount Lemmon Survey | · | 690 m | MPC · JPL |
| 525332 | 2004 YS_{37} | — | December 20, 2004 | Mount Lemmon | Mount Lemmon Survey | · | 990 m | MPC · JPL |
| 525333 | 2004 YU_{37} | — | December 20, 2004 | Mount Lemmon | Mount Lemmon Survey | NYS | 1.0 km | MPC · JPL |
| 525334 | 2005 AA_{12} | — | January 6, 2005 | Catalina | CSS | V | 820 m | MPC · JPL |
| 525335 | 2005 AL_{13} | — | December 12, 2004 | Kitt Peak | Spacewatch | · | 3.0 km | MPC · JPL |
| 525336 | 2005 AT_{14} | — | December 14, 2004 | Campo Imperatore | CINEOS | · | 1.8 km | MPC · JPL |
| 525337 | 2005 AX_{22} | — | December 19, 2004 | Mount Lemmon | Mount Lemmon Survey | · | 900 m | MPC · JPL |
| 525338 | 2005 AU_{28} | — | January 15, 2005 | Catalina | CSS | · | 1.0 km | MPC · JPL |
| 525339 | 2005 AB_{38} | — | January 13, 2005 | Kitt Peak | Spacewatch | · | 3.2 km | MPC · JPL |
| 525340 | 2005 AJ_{47} | — | January 13, 2005 | Kitt Peak | Spacewatch | · | 2.0 km | MPC · JPL |
| 525341 | 2005 AR_{50} | — | January 13, 2005 | Kitt Peak | Spacewatch | · | 1.9 km | MPC · JPL |
| 525342 | 2005 AS_{50} | — | January 13, 2005 | Kitt Peak | Spacewatch | · | 2.3 km | MPC · JPL |
| 525343 | 2005 AE_{51} | — | January 13, 2005 | Kitt Peak | Spacewatch | · | 860 m | MPC · JPL |
| 525344 | 2005 AN_{62} | — | January 13, 2005 | Kitt Peak | Spacewatch | · | 2.0 km | MPC · JPL |
| 525345 | 2005 AN_{63} | — | January 13, 2005 | Kitt Peak | Spacewatch | · | 670 m | MPC · JPL |
| 525346 | 2005 AG_{64} | — | January 13, 2005 | Kitt Peak | Spacewatch | · | 1.6 km | MPC · JPL |
| 525347 | 2005 AF_{71} | — | January 15, 2005 | Kitt Peak | Spacewatch | · | 1.0 km | MPC · JPL |
| 525348 | 2005 AG_{71} | — | January 15, 2005 | Kitt Peak | Spacewatch | · | 1.6 km | MPC · JPL |
| 525349 | 2005 AO_{72} | — | January 15, 2005 | Kitt Peak | Spacewatch | · | 790 m | MPC · JPL |
| 525350 | 2005 AD_{73} | — | January 15, 2005 | Kitt Peak | Spacewatch | · | 1.0 km | MPC · JPL |
| 525351 | 2005 AL_{73} | — | January 15, 2005 | Kitt Peak | Spacewatch | · | 1.7 km | MPC · JPL |
| 525352 | 2005 AN_{76} | — | January 15, 2005 | Kitt Peak | Spacewatch | HOF | 2.2 km | MPC · JPL |
| 525353 | 2005 AQ_{79} | — | January 15, 2005 | Kitt Peak | Spacewatch | · | 1.4 km | MPC · JPL |
| 525354 | 2005 AR_{80} | — | January 15, 2005 | Kitt Peak | Spacewatch | MAS | 650 m | MPC · JPL |
| 525355 | 2005 BR_{3} | — | January 8, 2005 | Campo Imperatore | CINEOS | · | 1.7 km | MPC · JPL |
| 525356 | 2005 BG_{14} | — | January 20, 2005 | Anderson Mesa | LONEOS | APO · PHA | 630 m | MPC · JPL |
| 525357 | 2005 BS_{14} | — | January 16, 2005 | Kitt Peak | Spacewatch | · | 730 m | MPC · JPL |
| 525358 | 2005 BB_{17} | — | January 16, 2005 | Kitt Peak | Spacewatch | · | 1.1 km | MPC · JPL |
| 525359 | 2005 BK_{27} | — | January 16, 2005 | Catalina | CSS | PHO | 870 m | MPC · JPL |
| 525360 | 2005 BE_{28} | — | January 13, 2005 | Kitt Peak | Spacewatch | H | 680 m | MPC · JPL |
| 525361 | 2005 BJ_{31} | — | January 13, 2005 | Kitt Peak | Spacewatch | · | 2.6 km | MPC · JPL |
| 525362 | 2005 BQ_{33} | — | January 13, 2005 | Kitt Peak | Spacewatch | · | 1.7 km | MPC · JPL |
| 525363 | 2005 BE_{50} | — | January 17, 2005 | Catalina | CSS | H | 570 m | MPC · JPL |
| 525364 | 2005 CL_{7} | — | February 3, 2005 | Socorro | LINEAR | APO | 420 m | MPC · JPL |
| 525365 | 2005 CH_{9} | — | January 15, 2005 | Kitt Peak | Spacewatch | · | 720 m | MPC · JPL |
| 525366 | 2005 CK_{28} | — | February 1, 2005 | Kitt Peak | Spacewatch | · | 1.3 km | MPC · JPL |
| 525367 | 2005 CC_{29} | — | February 1, 2005 | Kitt Peak | Spacewatch | AGN | 1.1 km | MPC · JPL |
| 525368 | 2005 CA_{30} | — | February 1, 2005 | Kitt Peak | Spacewatch | · | 730 m | MPC · JPL |
| 525369 | 2005 CN_{30} | — | February 1, 2005 | Kitt Peak | Spacewatch | · | 840 m | MPC · JPL |
| 525370 | 2005 CS_{33} | — | December 18, 2004 | Mount Lemmon | Mount Lemmon Survey | · | 1.0 km | MPC · JPL |
| 525371 | 2005 CG_{42} | — | December 20, 2004 | Mount Lemmon | Mount Lemmon Survey | · | 2.2 km | MPC · JPL |
| 525372 | 2005 CX_{44} | — | February 2, 2005 | Kitt Peak | Spacewatch | · | 960 m | MPC · JPL |
| 525373 | 2005 CT_{55} | — | February 4, 2005 | Mount Lemmon | Mount Lemmon Survey | · | 720 m | MPC · JPL |
| 525374 | 2005 CU_{79} | — | February 1, 2005 | Kitt Peak | Spacewatch | · | 460 m | MPC · JPL |
| 525375 | 2005 CX_{81} | — | February 2, 2005 | Kitt Peak | Spacewatch | · | 1.6 km | MPC · JPL |
| 525376 | 2005 CA_{82} | — | February 4, 2005 | Mount Lemmon | Mount Lemmon Survey | GEF | 980 m | MPC · JPL |
| 525377 | 2005 CD_{82} | — | February 9, 2005 | Anderson Mesa | LONEOS | · | 920 m | MPC · JPL |
| 525378 | 2005 EJ_{9} | — | March 2, 2005 | Kitt Peak | Spacewatch | · | 920 m | MPC · JPL |
| 525379 | 2005 EA_{16} | — | March 3, 2005 | Kitt Peak | Spacewatch | V | 570 m | MPC · JPL |
| 525380 | 2005 EN_{19} | — | March 3, 2005 | Kitt Peak | Spacewatch | · | 1.6 km | MPC · JPL |
| 525381 | 2005 EG_{26} | — | March 3, 2005 | Catalina | CSS | · | 1.2 km | MPC · JPL |
| 525382 | 2005 EL_{28} | — | March 3, 2005 | Catalina | CSS | PHO | 890 m | MPC · JPL |
| 525383 | 2005 EO_{40} | — | February 2, 2005 | Kitt Peak | Spacewatch | MAS | 570 m | MPC · JPL |
| 525384 | 2005 EH_{42} | — | March 2, 2005 | Kitt Peak | Spacewatch | · | 1.9 km | MPC · JPL |
| 525385 | 2005 EE_{47} | — | March 3, 2005 | Kitt Peak | Spacewatch | · | 570 m | MPC · JPL |
| 525386 | 2005 EM_{57} | — | March 4, 2005 | Mount Lemmon | Mount Lemmon Survey | · | 720 m | MPC · JPL |
| 525387 | 2005 ER_{57} | — | September 28, 2003 | Kitt Peak | Spacewatch | AGN | 950 m | MPC · JPL |
| 525388 | 2005 EF_{59} | — | February 9, 2005 | Kitt Peak | Spacewatch | · | 2.9 km | MPC · JPL |
| 525389 | 2005 EY_{59} | — | March 4, 2005 | Mount Lemmon | Mount Lemmon Survey | · | 2.0 km | MPC · JPL |
| 525390 | 2005 EZ_{62} | — | January 1, 2014 | Kitt Peak | Spacewatch | · | 1.7 km | MPC · JPL |
| 525391 | 2005 EM_{64} | — | March 4, 2005 | Mount Lemmon | Mount Lemmon Survey | · | 760 m | MPC · JPL |
| 525392 | 2005 EZ_{74} | — | March 3, 2005 | Kitt Peak | Spacewatch | · | 510 m | MPC · JPL |
| 525393 | 2005 EW_{76} | — | March 3, 2005 | Kitt Peak | Spacewatch | · | 460 m | MPC · JPL |
| 525394 | 2005 ES_{77} | — | March 3, 2005 | Catalina | CSS | NYS | 1.1 km | MPC · JPL |
| 525395 | 2005 EU_{78} | — | March 3, 2005 | Catalina | CSS | · | 610 m | MPC · JPL |
| 525396 | 2005 EE_{85} | — | March 4, 2005 | Mount Lemmon | Mount Lemmon Survey | KOR | 1.4 km | MPC · JPL |
| 525397 | 2005 EV_{86} | — | March 4, 2005 | Mount Lemmon | Mount Lemmon Survey | · | 1.7 km | MPC · JPL |
| 525398 | 2005 EM_{87} | — | March 4, 2005 | Mount Lemmon | Mount Lemmon Survey | · | 730 m | MPC · JPL |
| 525399 | 2005 ET_{87} | — | March 4, 2005 | Mount Lemmon | Mount Lemmon Survey | · | 1.0 km | MPC · JPL |
| 525400 | 2005 EV_{94} | — | December 20, 2004 | Mount Lemmon | Mount Lemmon Survey | · | 790 m | MPC · JPL |

== 525401–525500 ==
back to top

| Designation | | | Discovery | | | Properties | | Ref |
| Permanent | Provisional | Named after | Date | Site | Discoverer(s) | Category | Diam. | Ref |
|---|---|---|---|---|---|---|---|---|
| 525401 | 2005 EZ_{104} | — | November 6, 1999 | Socorro | LINEAR | · | 2.2 km | MPC · JPL |
| 525402 | 2005 EN_{105} | — | March 4, 2005 | Mount Lemmon | Mount Lemmon Survey | MAS | 730 m | MPC · JPL |
| 525403 | 2005 EB_{106} | — | March 4, 2005 | Mount Lemmon | Mount Lemmon Survey | AGN | 1.4 km | MPC · JPL |
| 525404 | 2005 ET_{107} | — | February 9, 2005 | Mount Lemmon | Mount Lemmon Survey | · | 1.3 km | MPC · JPL |
| 525405 | 2005 EU_{111} | — | March 4, 2005 | Mount Lemmon | Mount Lemmon Survey | · | 2.3 km | MPC · JPL |
| 525406 | 2005 EX_{112} | — | March 4, 2005 | Mount Lemmon | Mount Lemmon Survey | (2076) | 550 m | MPC · JPL |
| 525407 | 2005 ER_{121} | — | March 8, 2005 | Anderson Mesa | LONEOS | · | 870 m | MPC · JPL |
| 525408 | 2005 EJ_{122} | — | March 8, 2005 | Mount Lemmon | Mount Lemmon Survey | · | 1.4 km | MPC · JPL |
| 525409 | 2005 ES_{123} | — | March 8, 2005 | Kitt Peak | Spacewatch | (2076) | 750 m | MPC · JPL |
| 525410 | 2005 ET_{123} | — | March 8, 2005 | Kitt Peak | Spacewatch | EOS | 2.2 km | MPC · JPL |
| 525411 | 2005 EN_{126} | — | September 18, 2003 | Kitt Peak | Spacewatch | MAS | 670 m | MPC · JPL |
| 525412 | 2005 EE_{129} | — | March 9, 2005 | Kitt Peak | Spacewatch | · | 2.1 km | MPC · JPL |
| 525413 | 2005 EP_{135} | — | March 9, 2005 | Mount Lemmon | Mount Lemmon Survey | NYS | 740 m | MPC · JPL |
| 525414 | 2005 EM_{143} | — | March 3, 2005 | Kitt Peak | Spacewatch | · | 1.6 km | MPC · JPL |
| 525415 | 2005 EB_{146} | — | December 16, 2003 | Kitt Peak | Spacewatch | · | 1.3 km | MPC · JPL |
| 525416 | 2005 EM_{147} | — | March 10, 2005 | Mount Lemmon | Mount Lemmon Survey | NYS | 800 m | MPC · JPL |
| 525417 | 2005 ED_{150} | — | March 10, 2005 | Kitt Peak | Spacewatch | · | 780 m | MPC · JPL |
| 525418 | 2005 EP_{157} | — | March 9, 2005 | Mount Lemmon | Mount Lemmon Survey | · | 720 m | MPC · JPL |
| 525419 | 2005 ER_{159} | — | March 4, 2005 | Mount Lemmon | Mount Lemmon Survey | NYS | 800 m | MPC · JPL |
| 525420 | 2005 EV_{167} | — | March 11, 2005 | Mount Lemmon | Mount Lemmon Survey | MAS | 710 m | MPC · JPL |
| 525421 | 2005 ED_{169} | — | March 8, 2005 | Kitt Peak | Spacewatch | · | 390 m | MPC · JPL |
| 525422 | 2005 EQ_{169} | — | March 12, 2005 | Socorro | LINEAR | · | 1.4 km | MPC · JPL |
| 525423 | 2005 EQ_{173} | — | March 8, 2005 | Kitt Peak | Spacewatch | · | 860 m | MPC · JPL |
| 525424 | 2005 EZ_{178} | — | March 9, 2005 | Kitt Peak | Spacewatch | · | 610 m | MPC · JPL |
| 525425 | 2005 EP_{188} | — | March 10, 2005 | Mount Lemmon | Mount Lemmon Survey | · | 580 m | MPC · JPL |
| 525426 | 2005 EG_{191} | — | March 11, 2005 | Mount Lemmon | Mount Lemmon Survey | · | 1.7 km | MPC · JPL |
| 525427 | 2005 EQ_{192} | — | March 11, 2005 | Mount Lemmon | Mount Lemmon Survey | · | 810 m | MPC · JPL |
| 525428 | 2005 EV_{193} | — | March 11, 2005 | Mount Lemmon | Mount Lemmon Survey | · | 1.8 km | MPC · JPL |
| 525429 | 2005 EE_{198} | — | March 11, 2005 | Mount Lemmon | Mount Lemmon Survey | (32418) | 1.8 km | MPC · JPL |
| 525430 | 2005 EU_{209} | — | March 4, 2005 | Kitt Peak | Spacewatch | · | 2.8 km | MPC · JPL |
| 525431 | 2005 EK_{210} | — | March 4, 2005 | Kitt Peak | Spacewatch | · | 880 m | MPC · JPL |
| 525432 | 2005 EN_{214} | — | March 3, 2005 | Catalina | CSS | · | 730 m | MPC · JPL |
| 525433 | 2005 EJ_{215} | — | March 8, 2005 | Kitt Peak | Spacewatch | · | 610 m | MPC · JPL |
| 525434 | 2005 ET_{215} | — | March 8, 2005 | Anderson Mesa | LONEOS | EOS | 3.9 km | MPC · JPL |
| 525435 | 2005 EM_{216} | — | March 8, 2005 | Mount Lemmon | Mount Lemmon Survey | MRX | 940 m | MPC · JPL |
| 525436 | 2005 EY_{221} | — | February 4, 2005 | Kitt Peak | Spacewatch | · | 3.3 km | MPC · JPL |
| 525437 | 2005 EK_{229} | — | February 9, 2005 | Mount Lemmon | Mount Lemmon Survey | EUN | 1.3 km | MPC · JPL |
| 525438 | 2005 EV_{231} | — | March 10, 2005 | Mount Lemmon | Mount Lemmon Survey | · | 1.7 km | MPC · JPL |
| 525439 | 2005 EV_{236} | — | March 26, 1995 | Kitt Peak | Spacewatch | · | 4.5 km | MPC · JPL |
| 525440 | 2005 ER_{239} | — | March 11, 2005 | Kitt Peak | Spacewatch | MAS | 810 m | MPC · JPL |
| 525441 | 2005 EL_{240} | — | March 11, 2005 | Kitt Peak | Spacewatch | · | 910 m | MPC · JPL |
| 525442 | 2005 EC_{241} | — | March 11, 2005 | Catalina | CSS | PHO | 860 m | MPC · JPL |
| 525443 | 2005 EV_{246} | — | March 12, 2005 | Kitt Peak | Spacewatch | · | 1.6 km | MPC · JPL |
| 525444 | 2005 EQ_{253} | — | March 11, 2005 | Kitt Peak | Spacewatch | · | 1.4 km | MPC · JPL |
| 525445 | 2005 EY_{253} | — | February 1, 2005 | Kitt Peak | Spacewatch | · | 1.7 km | MPC · JPL |
| 525446 | 2005 ER_{255} | — | March 11, 2005 | Mount Lemmon | Mount Lemmon Survey | PAD | 1.6 km | MPC · JPL |
| 525447 | 2005 EC_{256} | — | March 11, 2005 | Mount Lemmon | Mount Lemmon Survey | DOR | 1.5 km | MPC · JPL |
| 525448 | 2005 EK_{258} | — | March 11, 2005 | Mount Lemmon | Mount Lemmon Survey | · | 550 m | MPC · JPL |
| 525449 | 2005 EQ_{261} | — | March 13, 2005 | Kitt Peak | Spacewatch | · | 2.0 km | MPC · JPL |
| 525450 | 2005 EW_{261} | — | March 23, 2001 | Kitt Peak | Spacewatch | AGN | 1.7 km | MPC · JPL |
| 525451 | 2005 EL_{264} | — | March 13, 2005 | Kitt Peak | Spacewatch | · | 1.1 km | MPC · JPL |
| 525452 | 2005 EM_{264} | — | March 13, 2005 | Kitt Peak | Spacewatch | · | 2.0 km | MPC · JPL |
| 525453 | 2005 EY_{264} | — | March 13, 2005 | Catalina | CSS | · | 860 m | MPC · JPL |
| 525454 | 2005 EV_{276} | — | March 8, 2005 | Mount Lemmon | Mount Lemmon Survey | · | 2.5 km | MPC · JPL |
| 525455 | 2005 EW_{284} | — | March 11, 2005 | Mount Lemmon | Mount Lemmon Survey | EOS | 1.8 km | MPC · JPL |
| 525456 | 2005 EY_{284} | — | March 11, 2005 | Mount Lemmon | Mount Lemmon Survey | TEL | 1.4 km | MPC · JPL |
| 525457 | 2005 EQ_{289} | — | March 9, 2005 | Catalina | CSS | · | 2.5 km | MPC · JPL |
| 525458 | 2005 ER_{289} | — | March 9, 2005 | Catalina | CSS | · | 2.1 km | MPC · JPL |
| 525459 | 2005 ER_{297} | — | March 11, 2005 | Kitt Peak | M. W. Buie | · | 460 m | MPC · JPL |
| 525460 | 2005 EX_{297} | — | March 11, 2005 | Kitt Peak | M. W. Buie | cubewano (cold) | 181 km | MPC · JPL |
| 525461 | 2005 EN_{302} | — | March 11, 2005 | Kitt Peak | M. W. Buie | cubewano (cold) | 137 km | MPC · JPL |
| 525462 | 2005 EO_{304} | — | March 11, 2005 | Kitt Peak | M. W. Buie | cubewano (cold) · moon | 152 km | MPC · JPL |
| 525463 | 2005 EZ_{316} | — | February 9, 2005 | Kitt Peak | Spacewatch | · | 1.6 km | MPC · JPL |
| 525464 | 2005 EX_{327} | — | March 4, 2005 | Mount Lemmon | Mount Lemmon Survey | PHO | 840 m | MPC · JPL |
| 525465 | 2005 EZ_{328} | — | March 10, 2005 | Mount Lemmon | Mount Lemmon Survey | V | 530 m | MPC · JPL |
| 525466 | 2005 EP_{329} | — | December 1, 2008 | Kitt Peak | Spacewatch | · | 1.1 km | MPC · JPL |
| 525467 | 2005 EM_{330} | — | March 9, 2005 | Catalina | CSS | BRA | 1.8 km | MPC · JPL |
| 525468 | 2005 EL_{331} | — | February 17, 2010 | Kitt Peak | Spacewatch | · | 1.6 km | MPC · JPL |
| 525469 | 2005 EW_{333} | — | March 10, 2005 | Mount Lemmon | Mount Lemmon Survey | · | 1.4 km | MPC · JPL |
| 525470 | 2005 EC_{334} | — | March 4, 2005 | Mount Lemmon | Mount Lemmon Survey | · | 710 m | MPC · JPL |
| 525471 | 2005 ED_{334} | — | March 4, 2005 | Mount Lemmon | Mount Lemmon Survey | · | 2.0 km | MPC · JPL |
| 525472 | 2005 EE_{334} | — | March 4, 2005 | Mount Lemmon | Mount Lemmon Survey | · | 1.8 km | MPC · JPL |
| 525473 | 2005 EH_{334} | — | March 8, 2005 | Mount Lemmon | Mount Lemmon Survey | · | 1.2 km | MPC · JPL |
| 525474 | 2005 EP_{334} | — | March 10, 2005 | Mount Lemmon | Mount Lemmon Survey | · | 1.8 km | MPC · JPL |
| 525475 | 2005 EQ_{334} | — | March 10, 2005 | Mount Lemmon | Mount Lemmon Survey | · | 1 km | MPC · JPL |
| 525476 | 2005 ET_{334} | — | March 13, 2005 | Catalina | CSS | · | 2.0 km | MPC · JPL |
| 525477 | 2005 FC_{3} | — | March 17, 2005 | Mount Lemmon | Mount Lemmon Survey | APO · slow | 470 m | MPC · JPL |
| 525478 | 2005 FS_{3} | — | March 16, 2005 | Catalina | CSS | PHO | 830 m | MPC · JPL |
| 525479 | 2005 FV_{13} | — | March 17, 2005 | Kitt Peak | Spacewatch | · | 2.5 km | MPC · JPL |
| 525480 | 2005 FR_{15} | — | March 17, 2005 | Kitt Peak | Spacewatch | NYS | 1.1 km | MPC · JPL |
| 525481 | 2005 FW_{15} | — | March 10, 2005 | Mount Lemmon | Mount Lemmon Survey | · | 620 m | MPC · JPL |
| 525482 | 2005 FT_{16} | — | March 16, 2005 | Mount Lemmon | Mount Lemmon Survey | · | 630 m | MPC · JPL |
| 525483 | 2005 FV_{16} | — | March 17, 2005 | Mount Lemmon | Mount Lemmon Survey | · | 680 m | MPC · JPL |
| 525484 | 2005 GL | — | April 1, 2005 | Socorro | LINEAR | APO · PHA | 200 m | MPC · JPL |
| 525485 | 2005 GN_{3} | — | April 1, 2005 | Kitt Peak | Spacewatch | NYS | 1.1 km | MPC · JPL |
| 525486 | 2005 GY_{3} | — | April 1, 2005 | Kitt Peak | Spacewatch | · | 2.2 km | MPC · JPL |
| 525487 | 2005 GJ_{15} | — | January 8, 1999 | Kitt Peak | Spacewatch | · | 1.7 km | MPC · JPL |
| 525488 | 2005 GZ_{15} | — | March 12, 2005 | Kitt Peak | Spacewatch | · | 670 m | MPC · JPL |
| 525489 | 2005 GU_{25} | — | April 2, 2005 | Mount Lemmon | Mount Lemmon Survey | · | 2.0 km | MPC · JPL |
| 525490 | 2005 GO_{26} | — | April 2, 2005 | Mount Lemmon | Mount Lemmon Survey | · | 2.1 km | MPC · JPL |
| 525491 | 2005 GZ_{31} | — | April 4, 2005 | Mount Lemmon | Mount Lemmon Survey | KOR | 1.3 km | MPC · JPL |
| 525492 | 2005 GM_{49} | — | April 5, 2005 | Mount Lemmon | Mount Lemmon Survey | · | 740 m | MPC · JPL |
| 525493 | 2005 GA_{53} | — | April 2, 2005 | Mount Lemmon | Mount Lemmon Survey | · | 2.2 km | MPC · JPL |
| 525494 | 2005 GP_{55} | — | April 5, 2005 | Mount Lemmon | Mount Lemmon Survey | · | 840 m | MPC · JPL |
| 525495 | 2005 GE_{56} | — | April 6, 2005 | Mount Lemmon | Mount Lemmon Survey | · | 2.0 km | MPC · JPL |
| 525496 | 2005 GB_{58} | — | April 6, 2005 | Mount Lemmon | Mount Lemmon Survey | · | 1.6 km | MPC · JPL |
| 525497 | 2005 GD_{58} | — | April 6, 2005 | Mount Lemmon | Mount Lemmon Survey | EOS | 1.9 km | MPC · JPL |
| 525498 | 2005 GE_{60} | — | April 9, 2005 | Siding Spring | SSS | ATE | 130 m | MPC · JPL |
| 525499 | 2005 GQ_{62} | — | March 9, 2005 | Mount Lemmon | Mount Lemmon Survey | KOR | 1.1 km | MPC · JPL |
| 525500 | 2005 GL_{63} | — | March 16, 2005 | Catalina | CSS | · | 690 m | MPC · JPL |

== 525501–525600 ==
back to top

| Designation | | | Discovery | | | Properties | | Ref |
| Permanent | Provisional | Named after | Date | Site | Discoverer(s) | Category | Diam. | Ref |
|---|---|---|---|---|---|---|---|---|
| 525501 | 2005 GX_{73} | — | April 4, 2005 | Catalina | CSS | H | 600 m | MPC · JPL |
| 525502 | 2005 GF_{77} | — | April 6, 2005 | Kitt Peak | Spacewatch | · | 970 m | MPC · JPL |
| 525503 | 2005 GF_{82} | — | February 2, 2005 | Kitt Peak | Spacewatch | · | 2.2 km | MPC · JPL |
| 525504 | 2005 GK_{83} | — | March 4, 2005 | Kitt Peak | Spacewatch | · | 950 m | MPC · JPL |
| 525505 | 2005 GF_{90} | — | April 6, 2005 | Kitt Peak | Spacewatch | · | 850 m | MPC · JPL |
| 525506 | 2005 GL_{90} | — | April 6, 2005 | Kitt Peak | Spacewatch | NYS | 1.2 km | MPC · JPL |
| 525507 | 2005 GH_{91} | — | April 6, 2005 | Kitt Peak | Spacewatch | · | 940 m | MPC · JPL |
| 525508 | 2005 GS_{105} | — | February 27, 2001 | Kitt Peak | Spacewatch | NYS | 1.3 km | MPC · JPL |
| 525509 | 2005 GK_{112} | — | March 17, 2005 | Mount Lemmon | Mount Lemmon Survey | · | 730 m | MPC · JPL |
| 525510 | 2005 GT_{114} | — | October 9, 2002 | Kitt Peak | Spacewatch | · | 1.8 km | MPC · JPL |
| 525511 | 2005 GY_{119} | — | April 10, 2005 | Mount Lemmon | Mount Lemmon Survey | · | 1.0 km | MPC · JPL |
| 525512 | 2005 GB_{124} | — | April 9, 2005 | Mount Lemmon | Mount Lemmon Survey | · | 920 m | MPC · JPL |
| 525513 | 2005 GW_{125} | — | March 13, 2005 | Kitt Peak | Spacewatch | · | 2.0 km | MPC · JPL |
| 525514 | 2005 GB_{127} | — | April 11, 2005 | Mount Lemmon | Mount Lemmon Survey | · | 1.9 km | MPC · JPL |
| 525515 | 2005 GJ_{137} | — | April 11, 2005 | Kitt Peak | Spacewatch | PAD | 1.4 km | MPC · JPL |
| 525516 | 2005 GT_{142} | — | April 10, 2005 | Kitt Peak | Spacewatch | · | 4.0 km | MPC · JPL |
| 525517 | 2005 GY_{143} | — | April 10, 2005 | Kitt Peak | Spacewatch | · | 2.1 km | MPC · JPL |
| 525518 | 2005 GX_{146} | — | April 11, 2005 | Kitt Peak | Spacewatch | · | 3.2 km | MPC · JPL |
| 525519 | 2005 GO_{148} | — | April 11, 2005 | Anderson Mesa | LONEOS | · | 1.2 km | MPC · JPL |
| 525520 | 2005 GT_{149} | — | April 11, 2005 | Kitt Peak | Spacewatch | TIR | 3.5 km | MPC · JPL |
| 525521 | 2005 GC_{151} | — | April 11, 2005 | Kitt Peak | Spacewatch | · | 510 m | MPC · JPL |
| 525522 | 2005 GF_{151} | — | April 11, 2005 | Kitt Peak | Spacewatch | · | 790 m | MPC · JPL |
| 525523 | 2005 GU_{155} | — | April 10, 2005 | Mount Lemmon | Mount Lemmon Survey | MAS | 610 m | MPC · JPL |
| 525524 | 2005 GX_{155} | — | April 10, 2005 | Mount Lemmon | Mount Lemmon Survey | · | 800 m | MPC · JPL |
| 525525 | 2005 GY_{157} | — | April 11, 2005 | Mount Lemmon | Mount Lemmon Survey | · | 2.1 km | MPC · JPL |
| 525526 | 2005 GS_{158} | — | April 12, 2005 | Kitt Peak | Spacewatch | · | 3.4 km | MPC · JPL |
| 525527 | 2005 GS_{159} | — | April 12, 2005 | Mount Lemmon | Mount Lemmon Survey | EOS | 1.8 km | MPC · JPL |
| 525528 | 2005 GE_{160} | — | April 12, 2005 | Kitt Peak | Spacewatch | · | 1.0 km | MPC · JPL |
| 525529 | 2005 GM_{160} | — | May 30, 2000 | Kitt Peak | Spacewatch | · | 2.6 km | MPC · JPL |
| 525530 | 2005 GE_{162} | — | March 11, 2005 | Mount Lemmon | Mount Lemmon Survey | · | 700 m | MPC · JPL |
| 525531 | 2005 GB_{173} | — | November 10, 1996 | Kitt Peak | Spacewatch | · | 3.4 km | MPC · JPL |
| 525532 | 2005 GO_{174} | — | April 14, 2005 | Kitt Peak | Spacewatch | · | 650 m | MPC · JPL |
| 525533 | 2005 GS_{174} | — | April 14, 2005 | Kitt Peak | Spacewatch | · | 2.4 km | MPC · JPL |
| 525534 | 2005 GW_{175} | — | April 14, 2005 | Kitt Peak | Spacewatch | · | 2.5 km | MPC · JPL |
| 525535 | 2005 GT_{176} | — | April 14, 2005 | Kitt Peak | Spacewatch | DOR | 2.3 km | MPC · JPL |
| 525536 | 2005 GN_{178} | — | April 2, 2005 | Kitt Peak | Spacewatch | EOS | 2.2 km | MPC · JPL |
| 525537 | 2005 GM_{211} | — | April 2, 2005 | Mount Lemmon | Mount Lemmon Survey | MAS | 610 m | MPC · JPL |
| 525538 | 2005 GF_{217} | — | March 10, 2005 | Mount Lemmon | Mount Lemmon Survey | · | 2.1 km | MPC · JPL |
| 525539 | 2005 GB_{218} | — | September 18, 1995 | Kitt Peak | Spacewatch | H | 340 m | MPC · JPL |
| 525540 | 2005 GT_{219} | — | April 4, 2005 | Mount Lemmon | Mount Lemmon Survey | · | 940 m | MPC · JPL |
| 525541 | 2005 GS_{221} | — | April 7, 2005 | Kitt Peak | Spacewatch | · | 590 m | MPC · JPL |
| 525542 | 2005 GS_{222} | — | April 10, 2005 | Kitt Peak | Spacewatch | · | 1.7 km | MPC · JPL |
| 525543 | 2005 GH_{223} | — | April 10, 2005 | Kitt Peak | Spacewatch | · | 1.2 km | MPC · JPL |
| 525544 | 2005 GJ_{223} | — | April 10, 2005 | Kitt Peak | Spacewatch | · | 1.6 km | MPC · JPL |
| 525545 | 2005 GO_{229} | — | September 17, 2003 | Anderson Mesa | LONEOS | · | 990 m | MPC · JPL |
| 525546 | 2005 GA_{230} | — | April 4, 2005 | Catalina | CSS | · | 540 m | MPC · JPL |
| 525547 | 2005 GE_{230} | — | April 10, 2005 | Mount Lemmon | Mount Lemmon Survey | EOS | 2.0 km | MPC · JPL |
| 525548 | 2005 GF_{230} | — | April 10, 2005 | Mount Lemmon | Mount Lemmon Survey | · | 2.5 km | MPC · JPL |
| 525549 | 2005 HJ_{2} | — | April 17, 2005 | Kitt Peak | Spacewatch | H | 450 m | MPC · JPL |
| 525550 | 2005 HW_{3} | — | April 28, 2005 | Mayhill | Lowe, A. | · | 2.1 km | MPC · JPL |
| 525551 | 2005 HQ_{4} | — | April 18, 2005 | Kitt Peak | Spacewatch | · | 1.5 km | MPC · JPL |
| 525552 | 2005 JB | — | May 3, 2005 | Catalina | CSS | AMO | 580 m | MPC · JPL |
| 525553 | 2005 JG_{10} | — | March 14, 2005 | Mount Lemmon | Mount Lemmon Survey | EOS | 1.9 km | MPC · JPL |
| 525554 | 2005 JK_{18} | — | May 4, 2005 | Mount Lemmon | Mount Lemmon Survey | · | 920 m | MPC · JPL |
| 525555 | 2005 JM_{25} | — | December 1, 2003 | Kitt Peak | Spacewatch | · | 1.1 km | MPC · JPL |
| 525556 | 2005 JZ_{30} | — | March 12, 2005 | Kitt Peak | Spacewatch | · | 1.2 km | MPC · JPL |
| 525557 | 2005 JA_{31} | — | May 4, 2005 | Mount Lemmon | Mount Lemmon Survey | · | 550 m | MPC · JPL |
| 525558 | 2005 JY_{40} | — | October 6, 1996 | Kitt Peak | Spacewatch | · | 800 m | MPC · JPL |
| 525559 | 2005 JY_{42} | — | May 8, 2005 | Kitt Peak | Spacewatch | · | 1.3 km | MPC · JPL |
| 525560 | 2005 JQ_{46} | — | May 3, 2005 | Kitt Peak | Spacewatch | EOS | 1.8 km | MPC · JPL |
| 525561 | 2005 JH_{51} | — | May 4, 2005 | Kitt Peak | Spacewatch | NYS | 1.1 km | MPC · JPL |
| 525562 | 2005 JS_{52} | — | April 2, 2005 | Mount Lemmon | Mount Lemmon Survey | MAS | 610 m | MPC · JPL |
| 525563 | 2005 JA_{54} | — | May 4, 2005 | Kitt Peak | Spacewatch | EOS | 1.9 km | MPC · JPL |
| 525564 | 2005 JM_{54} | — | May 4, 2005 | Kitt Peak | Spacewatch | PHO | 1.3 km | MPC · JPL |
| 525565 | 2005 JO_{56} | — | May 6, 2005 | Kitt Peak | Spacewatch | H | 330 m | MPC · JPL |
| 525566 | 2005 JR_{56} | — | May 6, 2005 | Kitt Peak | Spacewatch | PHO | 740 m | MPC · JPL |
| 525567 | 2005 JJ_{61} | — | May 8, 2005 | Kitt Peak | Spacewatch | · | 2.6 km | MPC · JPL |
| 525568 | 2005 JB_{65} | — | May 4, 2005 | Kitt Peak | Spacewatch | · | 730 m | MPC · JPL |
| 525569 | 2005 JT_{79} | — | May 10, 2005 | Mount Lemmon | Mount Lemmon Survey | MAS | 810 m | MPC · JPL |
| 525570 | 2005 JH_{88} | — | May 10, 2005 | Anderson Mesa | LONEOS | · | 2.8 km | MPC · JPL |
| 525571 | 2005 JU_{92} | — | May 11, 2005 | Kitt Peak | Spacewatch | EOS | 2.2 km | MPC · JPL |
| 525572 | 2005 JU_{94} | — | May 7, 2005 | Mount Lemmon | Mount Lemmon Survey | (194) | 800 m | MPC · JPL |
| 525573 | 2005 JJ_{96} | — | March 14, 2005 | Mount Lemmon | Mount Lemmon Survey | EOS | 1.8 km | MPC · JPL |
| 525574 | 2005 JE_{97} | — | May 8, 2005 | Kitt Peak | Spacewatch | PHO | 880 m | MPC · JPL |
| 525575 | 2005 JN_{102} | — | May 9, 2005 | Kitt Peak | Spacewatch | · | 2.2 km | MPC · JPL |
| 525576 | 2005 JC_{106} | — | May 11, 2005 | Mount Lemmon | Mount Lemmon Survey | · | 1.9 km | MPC · JPL |
| 525577 | 2005 JZ_{113} | — | April 16, 2005 | Kitt Peak | Spacewatch | · | 3.7 km | MPC · JPL |
| 525578 | 2005 JR_{114} | — | May 10, 2005 | Kitt Peak | Spacewatch | · | 2.3 km | MPC · JPL |
| 525579 | 2005 JJ_{117} | — | May 10, 2005 | Kitt Peak | Spacewatch | · | 970 m | MPC · JPL |
| 525580 | 2005 JA_{122} | — | May 10, 2005 | Kitt Peak | Spacewatch | EOS | 1.9 km | MPC · JPL |
| 525581 | 2005 JP_{124} | — | May 11, 2005 | Kitt Peak | Spacewatch | · | 1.4 km | MPC · JPL |
| 525582 | 2005 JZ_{130} | — | May 13, 2005 | Kitt Peak | Spacewatch | · | 2.3 km | MPC · JPL |
| 525583 | 2005 JT_{136} | — | April 13, 2005 | Catalina | CSS | · | 970 m | MPC · JPL |
| 525584 | 2005 JJ_{138} | — | May 13, 2005 | Kitt Peak | Spacewatch | · | 980 m | MPC · JPL |
| 525585 | 2005 JK_{138} | — | April 30, 2005 | Kitt Peak | Spacewatch | EOS | 1.9 km | MPC · JPL |
| 525586 | 2005 JS_{143} | — | May 15, 2005 | Mount Lemmon | Mount Lemmon Survey | NYS | 1.1 km | MPC · JPL |
| 525587 | 2005 JG_{153} | — | March 9, 2005 | Mount Lemmon | Mount Lemmon Survey | · | 700 m | MPC · JPL |
| 525588 | 2005 JG_{159} | — | May 7, 2005 | Kitt Peak | Spacewatch | · | 3.8 km | MPC · JPL |
| 525589 | 2005 JJ_{159} | — | March 12, 2005 | Mount Lemmon | Mount Lemmon Survey | · | 3.0 km | MPC · JPL |
| 525590 | 2005 JO_{161} | — | May 8, 2005 | Kitt Peak | Spacewatch | · | 1.0 km | MPC · JPL |
| 525591 | 2005 JA_{163} | — | May 8, 2005 | Mount Lemmon | Mount Lemmon Survey | · | 1 km | MPC · JPL |
| 525592 | 2005 JV_{164} | — | May 10, 2005 | Mount Lemmon | Mount Lemmon Survey | · | 1.0 km | MPC · JPL |
| 525593 | 2005 JL_{171} | — | April 16, 2005 | Kitt Peak | Spacewatch | · | 590 m | MPC · JPL |
| 525594 | 2005 JT_{171} | — | April 7, 2005 | Kitt Peak | Spacewatch | NYS | 790 m | MPC · JPL |
| 525595 | 2005 JP_{179} | — | May 11, 2005 | Cerro Tololo | M. W. Buie | cubewano (cold) | 175 km | MPC · JPL |
| 525596 | 2005 JR_{179} | — | May 11, 2005 | Cerro Tololo | M. W. Buie | cubewano (cold) | 162 km | MPC · JPL |
| 525597 | 2005 JN_{183} | — | May 11, 2005 | Kitt Peak | Spacewatch | · | 2.0 km | MPC · JPL |
| 525598 | 2005 JS_{184} | — | April 10, 2010 | Mount Lemmon | Mount Lemmon Survey | · | 1.4 km | MPC · JPL |
| 525599 | 2005 JU_{186} | — | October 17, 2007 | Mount Lemmon | Mount Lemmon Survey | · | 2.0 km | MPC · JPL |
| 525600 | 2005 JA_{187} | — | December 29, 2008 | Kitt Peak | Spacewatch | · | 3.5 km | MPC · JPL |

== 525601–525700 ==
back to top

| Designation | | | Discovery | | | Properties | | Ref |
| Permanent | Provisional | Named after | Date | Site | Discoverer(s) | Category | Diam. | Ref |
|---|---|---|---|---|---|---|---|---|
| 525601 | 2005 JH_{187} | — | May 14, 2005 | Mount Lemmon | Mount Lemmon Survey | · | 2.8 km | MPC · JPL |
| 525602 | 2005 JJ_{187} | — | May 15, 2005 | Mount Lemmon | Mount Lemmon Survey | · | 2.2 km | MPC · JPL |
| 525603 | 2005 JK_{187} | — | May 15, 2005 | Mount Lemmon | Mount Lemmon Survey | NYS | 650 m | MPC · JPL |
| 525604 | 2005 KU_{3} | — | May 10, 2005 | Kitt Peak | Spacewatch | V | 690 m | MPC · JPL |
| 525605 | 2005 KQ_{7} | — | May 16, 2005 | Catalina | CSS | · | 1.3 km | MPC · JPL |
| 525606 | 2005 KD_{12} | — | April 30, 2005 | Kitt Peak | Spacewatch | PHO | 860 m | MPC · JPL |
| 525607 | 2005 KW_{14} | — | May 20, 2005 | Mount Lemmon | Mount Lemmon Survey | · | 780 m | MPC · JPL |
| 525608 | 2005 LF_{7} | — | June 1, 2005 | Kitt Peak | Spacewatch | · | 760 m | MPC · JPL |
| 525609 | 2005 LA_{16} | — | May 15, 2005 | Mount Lemmon | Mount Lemmon Survey | · | 2.5 km | MPC · JPL |
| 525610 | 2005 LH_{16} | — | June 5, 2005 | Kitt Peak | Spacewatch | · | 1.2 km | MPC · JPL |
| 525611 | 2005 LW_{26} | — | June 8, 2005 | Kitt Peak | Spacewatch | · | 1 km | MPC · JPL |
| 525612 | 2005 LD_{27} | — | June 8, 2005 | Kitt Peak | Spacewatch | EOS | 1.9 km | MPC · JPL |
| 525613 | 2005 LP_{27} | — | June 9, 2005 | Kitt Peak | Spacewatch | EUN | 1.1 km | MPC · JPL |
| 525614 | 2005 LN_{29} | — | June 10, 2005 | Kitt Peak | Spacewatch | NYS | 1.2 km | MPC · JPL |
| 525615 | 2005 LY_{31} | — | June 8, 2005 | Kitt Peak | Spacewatch | · | 1.5 km | MPC · JPL |
| 525616 | 2005 LQ_{38} | — | June 11, 2005 | Kitt Peak | Spacewatch | T_{j} (2.98) | 3.2 km | MPC · JPL |
| 525617 | 2005 LA_{47} | — | February 5, 2000 | Kitt Peak | M. W. Buie, R. L. Millis | · | 1.7 km | MPC · JPL |
| 525618 | 2005 LN_{47} | — | June 14, 2005 | Mount Lemmon | Mount Lemmon Survey | · | 1.2 km | MPC · JPL |
| 525619 | 2005 LV_{53} | — | June 15, 2005 | Mount Lemmon | Mount Lemmon Survey | · | 1.8 km | MPC · JPL |
| 525620 | 2005 LL_{54} | — | June 15, 2005 | Mount Lemmon | Mount Lemmon Survey | · | 830 m | MPC · JPL |
| 525621 | 2005 MV_{2} | — | June 18, 2005 | Mount Lemmon | Mount Lemmon Survey | · | 3.4 km | MPC · JPL |
| 525622 | 2005 MQ_{6} | — | June 26, 2005 | Mount Lemmon | Mount Lemmon Survey | · | 1.3 km | MPC · JPL |
| 525623 | 2005 MD_{9} | — | June 18, 2005 | Mount Lemmon | Mount Lemmon Survey | · | 2.2 km | MPC · JPL |
| 525624 | 2005 MU_{10} | — | May 20, 2005 | Mount Lemmon | Mount Lemmon Survey | · | 2.5 km | MPC · JPL |
| 525625 | 2005 MQ_{16} | — | June 27, 2005 | Kitt Peak | Spacewatch | · | 3.5 km | MPC · JPL |
| 525626 | 2005 MD_{25} | — | June 13, 2005 | Mount Lemmon | Mount Lemmon Survey | · | 1.0 km | MPC · JPL |
| 525627 | 2005 MW_{25} | — | June 27, 2005 | Kitt Peak | Spacewatch | · | 1.1 km | MPC · JPL |
| 525628 | 2005 MB_{27} | — | June 29, 2005 | Kitt Peak | Spacewatch | MAR | 1.1 km | MPC · JPL |
| 525629 | 2005 MT_{27} | — | June 29, 2005 | Kitt Peak | Spacewatch | · | 3.4 km | MPC · JPL |
| 525630 | 2005 MT_{34} | — | June 13, 2005 | Mount Lemmon | Mount Lemmon Survey | V | 650 m | MPC · JPL |
| 525631 | 2005 MF_{40} | — | June 30, 2005 | Kitt Peak | Spacewatch | PHO | 920 m | MPC · JPL |
| 525632 | 2005 MB_{41} | — | June 30, 2005 | Kitt Peak | Spacewatch | MAR | 1.1 km | MPC · JPL |
| 525633 | 2005 MR_{42} | — | June 29, 2005 | Kitt Peak | Spacewatch | · | 1.4 km | MPC · JPL |
| 525634 | 2005 MG_{49} | — | June 30, 2005 | Kitt Peak | Spacewatch | · | 790 m | MPC · JPL |
| 525635 | 2005 NW_{5} | — | May 21, 2005 | Mount Lemmon | Mount Lemmon Survey | · | 2.3 km | MPC · JPL |
| 525636 | 2005 NU_{6} | — | July 4, 2005 | Mount Lemmon | Mount Lemmon Survey | EOS | 1.8 km | MPC · JPL |
| 525637 | 2005 NT_{10} | — | May 20, 2005 | Mount Lemmon | Mount Lemmon Survey | · | 910 m | MPC · JPL |
| 525638 | 2005 NH_{15} | — | July 2, 2005 | Kitt Peak | Spacewatch | · | 2.4 km | MPC · JPL |
| 525639 | 2005 NJ_{15} | — | July 2, 2005 | Kitt Peak | Spacewatch | · | 1.4 km | MPC · JPL |
| 525640 | 2005 NV_{16} | — | July 2, 2005 | Kitt Peak | Spacewatch | H | 430 m | MPC · JPL |
| 525641 | 2005 NJ_{24} | — | July 4, 2005 | Kitt Peak | Spacewatch | · | 3.5 km | MPC · JPL |
| 525642 | 2005 NV_{24} | — | July 4, 2005 | Kitt Peak | Spacewatch | · | 2.4 km | MPC · JPL |
| 525643 | 2005 ND_{25} | — | July 4, 2005 | Kitt Peak | Spacewatch | · | 2.1 km | MPC · JPL |
| 525644 | 2005 NN_{25} | — | July 4, 2005 | Kitt Peak | Spacewatch | · | 1.9 km | MPC · JPL |
| 525645 | 2005 NT_{30} | — | July 4, 2005 | Kitt Peak | Spacewatch | NYS | 970 m | MPC · JPL |
| 525646 | 2005 NV_{34} | — | July 5, 2005 | Kitt Peak | Spacewatch | · | 1.7 km | MPC · JPL |
| 525647 | 2005 NB_{36} | — | June 17, 2005 | Mount Lemmon | Mount Lemmon Survey | · | 1.1 km | MPC · JPL |
| 525648 | 2005 NV_{38} | — | July 6, 2005 | Campo Imperatore | CINEOS | · | 3.9 km | MPC · JPL |
| 525649 | 2005 NY_{42} | — | July 5, 2005 | Mount Lemmon | Mount Lemmon Survey | EUN | 970 m | MPC · JPL |
| 525650 | 2005 NL_{43} | — | July 5, 2005 | Mount Lemmon | Mount Lemmon Survey | · | 1.7 km | MPC · JPL |
| 525651 | 2005 NO_{43} | — | July 6, 2005 | Kitt Peak | Spacewatch | · | 1.3 km | MPC · JPL |
| 525652 | 2005 NP_{44} | — | June 18, 2005 | Mount Lemmon | Mount Lemmon Survey | (194) | 1.2 km | MPC · JPL |
| 525653 | 2005 NQ_{45} | — | June 15, 2005 | Mount Lemmon | Mount Lemmon Survey | · | 760 m | MPC · JPL |
| 525654 | 2005 NR_{45} | — | July 5, 2005 | Mount Lemmon | Mount Lemmon Survey | · | 1.5 km | MPC · JPL |
| 525655 | 2005 NY_{45} | — | July 5, 2005 | Mount Lemmon | Mount Lemmon Survey | EOS | 1.8 km | MPC · JPL |
| 525656 | 2005 NH_{49} | — | July 13, 2001 | Haleakala | NEAT | (5) | 1.8 km | MPC · JPL |
| 525657 | 2005 NG_{50} | — | July 5, 2005 | Kitt Peak | Spacewatch | · | 1.3 km | MPC · JPL |
| 525658 | 2005 NO_{51} | — | July 8, 2005 | Kitt Peak | Spacewatch | · | 2.4 km | MPC · JPL |
| 525659 | 2005 NT_{52} | — | June 30, 2005 | Kitt Peak | Spacewatch | · | 2.7 km | MPC · JPL |
| 525660 | 2005 NA_{55} | — | July 10, 2005 | Kitt Peak | Spacewatch | (1298) | 3.5 km | MPC · JPL |
| 525661 | 2005 NW_{56} | — | July 5, 2005 | Kitt Peak | Spacewatch | MAS | 700 m | MPC · JPL |
| 525662 | 2005 NN_{58} | — | July 6, 2005 | Kitt Peak | Spacewatch | · | 1.2 km | MPC · JPL |
| 525663 | 2005 NL_{59} | — | July 4, 2005 | Kitt Peak | Spacewatch | · | 790 m | MPC · JPL |
| 525664 | 2005 NU_{59} | — | July 9, 2005 | Kitt Peak | Spacewatch | · | 1.2 km | MPC · JPL |
| 525665 | 2005 NW_{59} | — | July 9, 2005 | Kitt Peak | Spacewatch | · | 1.2 km | MPC · JPL |
| 525666 | 2005 NV_{62} | — | July 11, 2005 | Mount Lemmon | Mount Lemmon Survey | EOS | 2.0 km | MPC · JPL |
| 525667 | 2005 NP_{68} | — | June 17, 2005 | Mount Lemmon | Mount Lemmon Survey | · | 2.4 km | MPC · JPL |
| 525668 | 2005 NO_{69} | — | July 4, 2005 | Mount Lemmon | Mount Lemmon Survey | MAS | 550 m | MPC · JPL |
| 525669 | 2005 NW_{75} | — | June 13, 2005 | Mount Lemmon | Mount Lemmon Survey | · | 2.4 km | MPC · JPL |
| 525670 | 2005 NC_{77} | — | July 10, 2005 | Kitt Peak | Spacewatch | · | 3.7 km | MPC · JPL |
| 525671 | 2005 NC_{78} | — | July 11, 2005 | Kitt Peak | Spacewatch | EOS | 1.9 km | MPC · JPL |
| 525672 | 2005 NJ_{78} | — | July 11, 2005 | Kitt Peak | Spacewatch | · | 1.4 km | MPC · JPL |
| 525673 | 2005 NH_{83} | — | July 1, 2005 | Kitt Peak | Spacewatch | · | 3.1 km | MPC · JPL |
| 525674 | 2005 NN_{94} | — | July 6, 2005 | Kitt Peak | Spacewatch | · | 760 m | MPC · JPL |
| 525675 | 2005 NQ_{94} | — | July 6, 2005 | Kitt Peak | Spacewatch | EOS | 1.9 km | MPC · JPL |
| 525676 | 2005 NQ_{95} | — | July 7, 2005 | Kitt Peak | Spacewatch | · | 1.1 km | MPC · JPL |
| 525677 | 2005 NH_{102} | — | July 5, 2005 | Mount Lemmon | Mount Lemmon Survey | · | 1.3 km | MPC · JPL |
| 525678 | 2005 NM_{102} | — | July 12, 2005 | Anderson Mesa | LONEOS | · | 1.5 km | MPC · JPL |
| 525679 | 2005 NR_{126} | — | July 8, 2005 | Kitt Peak | Spacewatch | BRG | 1.5 km | MPC · JPL |
| 525680 | 2005 OH_{28} | — | July 30, 2005 | Palomar | NEAT | · | 830 m | MPC · JPL |
| 525681 | 2005 PO_{4} | — | October 18, 1998 | Kitt Peak | Spacewatch | · | 1.7 km | MPC · JPL |
| 525682 | 2005 PJ_{5} | — | August 3, 2005 | Saint-Sulpice | Saint-Sulpice | · | 1.2 km | MPC · JPL |
| 525683 | 2005 PK_{19} | — | July 15, 2005 | Kitt Peak | Spacewatch | · | 1.3 km | MPC · JPL |
| 525684 | 2005 QK_{20} | — | August 26, 2005 | Anderson Mesa | LONEOS | T_{j} (2.99) · 3:2 | 4.9 km | MPC · JPL |
| 525685 | 2005 QQ_{23} | — | August 27, 2005 | Kitt Peak | Spacewatch | NYS | 920 m | MPC · JPL |
| 525686 | 2005 QF_{25} | — | August 27, 2005 | Kitt Peak | Spacewatch | · | 1.1 km | MPC · JPL |
| 525687 | 2005 QS_{25} | — | August 27, 2005 | Kitt Peak | Spacewatch | · | 1.6 km | MPC · JPL |
| 525688 | 2005 QU_{26} | — | August 27, 2005 | Kitt Peak | Spacewatch | · | 970 m | MPC · JPL |
| 525689 | 2005 QG_{35} | — | August 25, 2005 | Palomar | NEAT | · | 1.6 km | MPC · JPL |
| 525690 | 2005 QB_{44} | — | August 26, 2005 | Palomar | NEAT | · | 1.7 km | MPC · JPL |
| 525691 | 2005 QJ_{52} | — | August 27, 2005 | Kitt Peak | Spacewatch | · | 1.6 km | MPC · JPL |
| 525692 | 2005 QM_{60} | — | August 26, 2005 | Anderson Mesa | LONEOS | · | 1.2 km | MPC · JPL |
| 525693 | 2005 QP_{67} | — | August 28, 2005 | Kitt Peak | Spacewatch | · | 2.9 km | MPC · JPL |
| 525694 | 2005 QR_{69} | — | August 28, 2005 | Siding Spring | SSS | · | 1.2 km | MPC · JPL |
| 525695 | 2005 QL_{70} | — | August 29, 2005 | Kitt Peak | Spacewatch | · | 1.5 km | MPC · JPL |
| 525696 | 2005 QF_{78} | — | August 25, 2005 | Palomar | NEAT | · | 800 m | MPC · JPL |
| 525697 | 2005 QJ_{89} | — | July 4, 2005 | Mount Lemmon | Mount Lemmon Survey | · | 5.8 km | MPC · JPL |
| 525698 | 2005 QY_{100} | — | August 27, 2005 | Palomar | NEAT | 3:2 | 4.7 km | MPC · JPL |
| 525699 | 2005 QE_{102} | — | August 27, 2005 | Palomar | NEAT | (5) | 1.0 km | MPC · JPL |
| 525700 | 2005 QB_{103} | — | July 31, 2005 | Palomar | NEAT | · | 630 m | MPC · JPL |

== 525701–525800 ==
back to top

| Designation | | | Discovery | | | Properties | | Ref |
| Permanent | Provisional | Named after | Date | Site | Discoverer(s) | Category | Diam. | Ref |
|---|---|---|---|---|---|---|---|---|
| 525701 | 2005 QW_{110} | — | August 27, 2005 | Palomar | NEAT | · | 1.1 km | MPC · JPL |
| 525702 | 2005 QZ_{111} | — | August 27, 2005 | Palomar | NEAT | · | 1.1 km | MPC · JPL |
| 525703 | 2005 QJ_{117} | — | August 28, 2005 | Kitt Peak | Spacewatch | EOS | 2.1 km | MPC · JPL |
| 525704 | 2005 QG_{122} | — | August 28, 2005 | Kitt Peak | Spacewatch | (194) | 1.3 km | MPC · JPL |
| 525705 | 2005 QO_{122} | — | August 28, 2005 | Kitt Peak | Spacewatch | MAR | 1.1 km | MPC · JPL |
| 525706 | 2005 QT_{122} | — | August 28, 2005 | Kitt Peak | Spacewatch | (5) | 1.1 km | MPC · JPL |
| 525707 | 2005 QB_{130} | — | August 28, 2005 | Kitt Peak | Spacewatch | · | 1.2 km | MPC · JPL |
| 525708 | 2005 QC_{151} | — | August 30, 2005 | Kitt Peak | Spacewatch | · | 1.4 km | MPC · JPL |
| 525709 | 2005 QJ_{160} | — | August 28, 2005 | Kitt Peak | Spacewatch | · | 1.3 km | MPC · JPL |
| 525710 | 2005 QP_{165} | — | August 31, 2005 | Palomar | NEAT | ADE | 1.6 km | MPC · JPL |
| 525711 | 2005 QT_{181} | — | August 31, 2005 | Anderson Mesa | LONEOS | JUN | 870 m | MPC · JPL |
| 525712 | 2005 QJ_{187} | — | August 30, 2005 | Kitt Peak | Spacewatch | · | 410 m | MPC · JPL |
| 525713 | 2005 QV_{188} | — | August 30, 2005 | Kitt Peak | Spacewatch | JUN | 690 m | MPC · JPL |
| 525714 | 2005 QK_{191} | — | August 30, 2005 | Kitt Peak | Spacewatch | · | 1.2 km | MPC · JPL |
| 525715 | 2005 RT_{2} | — | September 4, 2005 | Hormersdorf | Lorenz, J. | · | 1.1 km | MPC · JPL |
| 525716 | 2005 RN_{7} | — | August 29, 2005 | Anderson Mesa | LONEOS | · | 2.7 km | MPC · JPL |
| 525717 | 2005 RZ_{11} | — | September 1, 2005 | Kitt Peak | Spacewatch | · | 1.1 km | MPC · JPL |
| 525718 | 2005 RQ_{15} | — | March 23, 2003 | Kitt Peak | Spacewatch | · | 2.8 km | MPC · JPL |
| 525719 | 2005 RB_{16} | — | September 1, 2005 | Kitt Peak | Spacewatch | 3:2 | 3.8 km | MPC · JPL |
| 525720 | 2005 RM_{16} | — | September 1, 2005 | Anderson Mesa | LONEOS | JUN | 970 m | MPC · JPL |
| 525721 | 2005 RE_{19} | — | September 1, 2005 | Kitt Peak | Spacewatch | · | 3.2 km | MPC · JPL |
| 525722 | 2005 RY_{19} | — | September 1, 2005 | Kitt Peak | Spacewatch | · | 2.9 km | MPC · JPL |
| 525723 | 2005 RD_{20} | — | September 1, 2005 | Kitt Peak | Spacewatch | · | 1.6 km | MPC · JPL |
| 525724 | 2005 RM_{25} | — | August 30, 2005 | Anderson Mesa | LONEOS | · | 2.7 km | MPC · JPL |
| 525725 | 2005 RN_{28} | — | August 29, 2005 | Kitt Peak | Spacewatch | (5) | 1.2 km | MPC · JPL |
| 525726 | 2005 RG_{31} | — | September 11, 2005 | Kitt Peak | Spacewatch | · | 1.3 km | MPC · JPL |
| 525727 | 2005 RU_{40} | — | September 13, 2005 | Kitt Peak | Spacewatch | · | 950 m | MPC · JPL |
| 525728 | 2005 RP_{42} | — | August 31, 2005 | Kitt Peak | Spacewatch | MAR | 860 m | MPC · JPL |
| 525729 | 2005 RQ_{43} | — | September 9, 2005 | Apache Point | A. C. Becker, Puckett, A. W., Kubica, J. | cubewano (hot) | 249 km | MPC · JPL |
| 525730 | 2005 SG_{2} | — | September 22, 2005 | Palomar | NEAT | · | 1.6 km | MPC · JPL |
| 525731 | 2005 SH_{4} | — | September 24, 2005 | Kitt Peak | Spacewatch | · | 1.0 km | MPC · JPL |
| 525732 | 2005 SW_{15} | — | September 26, 2005 | Kitt Peak | Spacewatch | · | 950 m | MPC · JPL |
| 525733 | 2005 SX_{16} | — | September 26, 2005 | Kitt Peak | Spacewatch | · | 1.4 km | MPC · JPL |
| 525734 | 2005 SB_{17} | — | September 26, 2005 | Kitt Peak | Spacewatch | · | 1.1 km | MPC · JPL |
| 525735 | 2005 SZ_{21} | — | August 30, 2005 | Kitt Peak | Spacewatch | · | 1.1 km | MPC · JPL |
| 525736 | 2005 SH_{23} | — | September 23, 2005 | Catalina | CSS | · | 1.5 km | MPC · JPL |
| 525737 | 2005 SQ_{27} | — | September 23, 2005 | Kitt Peak | Spacewatch | · | 1.7 km | MPC · JPL |
| 525738 | 2005 SH_{29} | — | September 23, 2005 | Kitt Peak | Spacewatch | · | 1.2 km | MPC · JPL |
| 525739 | 2005 SL_{35} | — | September 23, 2005 | Kitt Peak | Spacewatch | NYS | 1.3 km | MPC · JPL |
| 525740 | 2005 SX_{42} | — | September 24, 2005 | Kitt Peak | Spacewatch | · | 2.6 km | MPC · JPL |
| 525741 | 2005 SF_{43} | — | September 24, 2005 | Kitt Peak | Spacewatch | (5) | 1.1 km | MPC · JPL |
| 525742 | 2005 SH_{50} | — | September 24, 2005 | Kitt Peak | Spacewatch | · | 1.2 km | MPC · JPL |
| 525743 | 2005 SS_{51} | — | September 24, 2005 | Kitt Peak | Spacewatch | · | 930 m | MPC · JPL |
| 525744 | 2005 SW_{52} | — | August 30, 2005 | Anderson Mesa | LONEOS | · | 1.5 km | MPC · JPL |
| 525745 | 2005 SW_{55} | — | September 25, 2005 | Kitt Peak | Spacewatch | · | 1.5 km | MPC · JPL |
| 525746 | 2005 SS_{56} | — | September 26, 2005 | Kitt Peak | Spacewatch | TEL | 1.4 km | MPC · JPL |
| 525747 | 2005 SR_{57} | — | September 26, 2005 | Kitt Peak | Spacewatch | · | 980 m | MPC · JPL |
| 525748 | 2005 SD_{60} | — | September 26, 2005 | Kitt Peak | Spacewatch | · | 3.3 km | MPC · JPL |
| 525749 | 2005 SE_{63} | — | September 26, 2005 | Palomar | NEAT | · | 940 m | MPC · JPL |
| 525750 | 2005 ST_{66} | — | September 27, 2005 | Kitt Peak | Spacewatch | · | 1.2 km | MPC · JPL |
| 525751 | 2005 SS_{75} | — | September 14, 2005 | Kitt Peak | Spacewatch | · | 1.1 km | MPC · JPL |
| 525752 | 2005 SQ_{78} | — | September 24, 2005 | Kitt Peak | Spacewatch | · | 1.0 km | MPC · JPL |
| 525753 | 2005 SU_{83} | — | September 24, 2005 | Kitt Peak | Spacewatch | · | 520 m | MPC · JPL |
| 525754 | 2005 SD_{84} | — | September 24, 2005 | Kitt Peak | Spacewatch | · | 960 m | MPC · JPL |
| 525755 | 2005 SH_{84} | — | September 24, 2005 | Kitt Peak | Spacewatch | · | 1.1 km | MPC · JPL |
| 525756 | 2005 SA_{86} | — | September 24, 2005 | Kitt Peak | Spacewatch | · | 1.4 km | MPC · JPL |
| 525757 | 2005 SB_{87} | — | September 24, 2005 | Kitt Peak | Spacewatch | · | 1.0 km | MPC · JPL |
| 525758 | 2005 SK_{93} | — | September 24, 2005 | Kitt Peak | Spacewatch | · | 900 m | MPC · JPL |
| 525759 | 2005 SW_{94} | — | September 25, 2005 | Palomar | NEAT | · | 1.1 km | MPC · JPL |
| 525760 | 2005 SH_{99} | — | September 25, 2005 | Kitt Peak | Spacewatch | · | 1.8 km | MPC · JPL |
| 525761 | 2005 SM_{101} | — | September 25, 2005 | Kitt Peak | Spacewatch | (5) | 860 m | MPC · JPL |
| 525762 | 2005 SV_{102} | — | September 25, 2005 | Kitt Peak | Spacewatch | · | 1.2 km | MPC · JPL |
| 525763 | 2005 SF_{105} | — | September 25, 2005 | Kitt Peak | Spacewatch | · | 1.3 km | MPC · JPL |
| 525764 | 2005 SO_{106} | — | September 26, 2005 | Kitt Peak | Spacewatch | · | 550 m | MPC · JPL |
| 525765 | 2005 SF_{112} | — | September 26, 2005 | Palomar | NEAT | · | 1.2 km | MPC · JPL |
| 525766 | 2005 SP_{125} | — | September 29, 2005 | Kitt Peak | Spacewatch | (5) | 1.2 km | MPC · JPL |
| 525767 | 2005 SU_{130} | — | September 29, 2005 | Mount Lemmon | Mount Lemmon Survey | · | 1.1 km | MPC · JPL |
| 525768 | 2005 SV_{130} | — | September 29, 2005 | Mount Lemmon | Mount Lemmon Survey | · | 1.4 km | MPC · JPL |
| 525769 | 2005 SA_{131} | — | September 29, 2005 | Mount Lemmon | Mount Lemmon Survey | HNS | 970 m | MPC · JPL |
| 525770 | 2005 SY_{132} | — | September 29, 2005 | Kitt Peak | Spacewatch | · | 1.4 km | MPC · JPL |
| 525771 | 2005 SW_{137} | — | September 25, 2005 | Kitt Peak | Spacewatch | · | 1.4 km | MPC · JPL |
| 525772 | 2005 SU_{138} | — | September 25, 2005 | Kitt Peak | Spacewatch | · | 530 m | MPC · JPL |
| 525773 | 2005 SG_{139} | — | September 25, 2005 | Kitt Peak | Spacewatch | · | 1.2 km | MPC · JPL |
| 525774 | 2005 SL_{139} | — | September 25, 2005 | Kitt Peak | Spacewatch | MAS | 710 m | MPC · JPL |
| 525775 | 2005 SD_{141} | — | September 25, 2005 | Kitt Peak | Spacewatch | EOS | 1.5 km | MPC · JPL |
| 525776 | 2005 SM_{145} | — | September 25, 2005 | Kitt Peak | Spacewatch | · | 1.0 km | MPC · JPL |
| 525777 | 2005 SW_{151} | — | September 25, 2005 | Kitt Peak | Spacewatch | HNS | 1.0 km | MPC · JPL |
| 525778 | 2005 SG_{153} | — | September 25, 2005 | Kitt Peak | Spacewatch | · | 1.2 km | MPC · JPL |
| 525779 | 2005 SF_{154} | — | September 26, 2005 | Kitt Peak | Spacewatch | · | 1.1 km | MPC · JPL |
| 525780 | 2005 SU_{157} | — | September 26, 2005 | Kitt Peak | Spacewatch | EUN | 900 m | MPC · JPL |
| 525781 | 2005 SW_{157} | — | September 26, 2005 | Kitt Peak | Spacewatch | · | 3.1 km | MPC · JPL |
| 525782 | 2005 SG_{162} | — | September 27, 2005 | Kitt Peak | Spacewatch | · | 1.2 km | MPC · JPL |
| 525783 | 2005 SU_{164} | — | September 27, 2005 | Palomar | NEAT | · | 780 m | MPC · JPL |
| 525784 | 2005 SP_{172} | — | September 29, 2005 | Kitt Peak | Spacewatch | · | 750 m | MPC · JPL |
| 525785 | 2005 SF_{174} | — | March 8, 2003 | Kitt Peak | Spacewatch | (5) | 930 m | MPC · JPL |
| 525786 | 2005 SE_{175} | — | September 29, 2005 | Kitt Peak | Spacewatch | · | 1.3 km | MPC · JPL |
| 525787 | 2005 SZ_{177} | — | September 29, 2005 | Kitt Peak | Spacewatch | · | 870 m | MPC · JPL |
| 525788 | 2005 SK_{179} | — | September 29, 2005 | Anderson Mesa | LONEOS | JUN | 880 m | MPC · JPL |
| 525789 | 2005 SB_{184} | — | September 29, 2005 | Kitt Peak | Spacewatch | H | 400 m | MPC · JPL |
| 525790 | 2005 SM_{196} | — | September 30, 2005 | Kitt Peak | Spacewatch | · | 2.6 km | MPC · JPL |
| 525791 | 2005 SV_{197} | — | September 30, 2005 | Mount Lemmon | Mount Lemmon Survey | (5) | 770 m | MPC · JPL |
| 525792 | 2005 SG_{201} | — | September 30, 2005 | Kitt Peak | Spacewatch | · | 1.6 km | MPC · JPL |
| 525793 | 2005 SX_{203} | — | September 30, 2005 | Mount Lemmon | Mount Lemmon Survey | MAS | 700 m | MPC · JPL |
| 525794 | 2005 ST_{207} | — | September 30, 2005 | Kitt Peak | Spacewatch | EUN | 990 m | MPC · JPL |
| 525795 | 2005 SC_{211} | — | September 30, 2005 | Palomar | NEAT | ADE | 1.6 km | MPC · JPL |
| 525796 | 2005 SD_{221} | — | September 29, 2005 | Kitt Peak | Spacewatch | · | 990 m | MPC · JPL |
| 525797 | 2005 SK_{223} | — | September 29, 2005 | Kitt Peak | Spacewatch | EOS | 1.6 km | MPC · JPL |
| 525798 | 2005 SG_{224} | — | September 29, 2005 | Mount Lemmon | Mount Lemmon Survey | EOS | 1.4 km | MPC · JPL |
| 525799 | 2005 SL_{225} | — | September 29, 2005 | Mount Lemmon | Mount Lemmon Survey | · | 900 m | MPC · JPL |
| 525800 | 2005 SV_{225} | — | September 24, 2005 | Kitt Peak | Spacewatch | · | 1.4 km | MPC · JPL |

== 525801–525900 ==
back to top

| Designation | | | Discovery | | | Properties | | Ref |
| Permanent | Provisional | Named after | Date | Site | Discoverer(s) | Category | Diam. | Ref |
|---|---|---|---|---|---|---|---|---|
| 525801 | 2005 SP_{237} | — | September 29, 2005 | Kitt Peak | Spacewatch | · | 520 m | MPC · JPL |
| 525802 | 2005 SV_{237} | — | September 29, 2005 | Kitt Peak | Spacewatch | · | 580 m | MPC · JPL |
| 525803 | 2005 SW_{241} | — | September 30, 2005 | Kitt Peak | Spacewatch | · | 1.4 km | MPC · JPL |
| 525804 | 2005 SP_{242} | — | September 30, 2005 | Kitt Peak | Spacewatch | HNS | 1.2 km | MPC · JPL |
| 525805 | 2005 SL_{244} | — | September 30, 2005 | Mount Lemmon | Mount Lemmon Survey | · | 940 m | MPC · JPL |
| 525806 | 2005 SP_{244} | — | September 30, 2005 | Mount Lemmon | Mount Lemmon Survey | · | 1.0 km | MPC · JPL |
| 525807 | 2005 SA_{248} | — | September 30, 2005 | Kitt Peak | Spacewatch | · | 1.2 km | MPC · JPL |
| 525808 | 2005 SW_{263} | — | September 23, 2005 | Kitt Peak | Spacewatch | · | 1.5 km | MPC · JPL |
| 525809 | 2005 SE_{266} | — | August 29, 2005 | Kitt Peak | Spacewatch | · | 2.6 km | MPC · JPL |
| 525810 | 2005 SE_{270} | — | September 29, 2005 | Kitt Peak | Spacewatch | · | 1.7 km | MPC · JPL |
| 525811 | 2005 SM_{274} | — | September 29, 2005 | Kitt Peak | Spacewatch | NYS | 1.0 km | MPC · JPL |
| 525812 | 2005 SN_{275} | — | September 29, 2005 | Kitt Peak | Spacewatch | · | 1.3 km | MPC · JPL |
| 525813 | 2005 SU_{276} | — | September 30, 2005 | Kitt Peak | Spacewatch | EOS | 1.5 km | MPC · JPL |
| 525814 | 2005 SS_{277} | — | September 30, 2005 | Mount Lemmon | Mount Lemmon Survey | · | 1.5 km | MPC · JPL |
| 525815 | 2005 SD_{278} | — | September 25, 2005 | Apache Point | A. C. Becker, Puckett, A. W., Kubica, J. | res · 2:5 | 208 km | MPC · JPL |
| 525816 | 2005 SF_{278} | — | September 26, 2005 | Apache Point | A. C. Becker, Puckett, A. W., Kubica, J. | res · 4:7 · moon | 174 km | MPC · JPL |
| 525817 | 2005 SA_{280} | — | September 23, 2005 | Catalina | CSS | · | 1.4 km | MPC · JPL |
| 525818 | 2005 SF_{294} | — | September 25, 2005 | Kitt Peak | Spacewatch | · | 1.5 km | MPC · JPL |
| 525819 | 2005 SK_{294} | — | September 29, 2005 | Mount Lemmon | Mount Lemmon Survey | · | 1.1 km | MPC · JPL |
| 525820 | 2005 SP_{294} | — | September 29, 2005 | Mount Lemmon | Mount Lemmon Survey | · | 990 m | MPC · JPL |
| 525821 | 2005 SV_{294} | — | September 30, 2005 | Mount Lemmon | Mount Lemmon Survey | · | 500 m | MPC · JPL |
| 525822 | 2005 TY_{5} | — | October 1, 2005 | Catalina | CSS | (1547) | 1.1 km | MPC · JPL |
| 525823 | 2005 TD_{7} | — | October 1, 2005 | Catalina | CSS | · | 1.7 km | MPC · JPL |
| 525824 | 2005 TH_{7} | — | August 30, 2005 | Socorro | LINEAR | · | 1.6 km | MPC · JPL |
| 525825 | 2005 TB_{8} | — | October 1, 2005 | Kitt Peak | Spacewatch | · | 1.3 km | MPC · JPL |
| 525826 | 2005 TQ_{16} | — | September 1, 2005 | Kitt Peak | Spacewatch | · | 2.3 km | MPC · JPL |
| 525827 | 2005 TT_{17} | — | September 29, 2005 | Anderson Mesa | LONEOS | · | 2.9 km | MPC · JPL |
| 525828 | 2005 TH_{20} | — | October 1, 2005 | Mount Lemmon | Mount Lemmon Survey | EOS | 1.6 km | MPC · JPL |
| 525829 | 2005 TS_{20} | — | March 23, 2004 | Kitt Peak | Spacewatch | · | 1.3 km | MPC · JPL |
| 525830 | 2005 TS_{29} | — | October 3, 2005 | Catalina | CSS | · | 1.4 km | MPC · JPL |
| 525831 | 2005 TK_{32} | — | September 23, 2005 | Kitt Peak | Spacewatch | · | 1.5 km | MPC · JPL |
| 525832 | 2005 TN_{35} | — | October 1, 2005 | Kitt Peak | Spacewatch | ADE | 1.7 km | MPC · JPL |
| 525833 | 2005 TR_{39} | — | October 1, 2005 | Kitt Peak | Spacewatch | · | 930 m | MPC · JPL |
| 525834 | 2005 TL_{41} | — | October 2, 2005 | Mount Lemmon | Mount Lemmon Survey | · | 500 m | MPC · JPL |
| 525835 | 2005 TE_{43} | — | October 5, 2005 | Kitt Peak | Spacewatch | · | 1.2 km | MPC · JPL |
| 525836 | 2005 TP_{43} | — | October 5, 2005 | Kitt Peak | Spacewatch | · | 940 m | MPC · JPL |
| 525837 | 2005 TV_{50} | — | September 27, 2005 | Kitt Peak | Spacewatch | · | 1.2 km | MPC · JPL |
| 525838 | 2005 TZ_{58} | — | October 1, 2005 | Mount Lemmon | Mount Lemmon Survey | V | 540 m | MPC · JPL |
| 525839 | 2005 TP_{63} | — | October 6, 2005 | Kitt Peak | Spacewatch | · | 1.6 km | MPC · JPL |
| 525840 | 2005 TO_{64} | — | October 7, 2005 | Kitt Peak | Spacewatch | · | 3.1 km | MPC · JPL |
| 525841 | 2005 TB_{67} | — | October 5, 2005 | Mount Lemmon | Mount Lemmon Survey | · | 550 m | MPC · JPL |
| 525842 | 2005 TQ_{70} | — | April 4, 2003 | Kitt Peak | Spacewatch | · | 1.9 km | MPC · JPL |
| 525843 | 2005 TK_{71} | — | October 7, 2005 | Mount Lemmon | Mount Lemmon Survey | · | 1.1 km | MPC · JPL |
| 525844 | 2005 TV_{73} | — | September 3, 2005 | Catalina | CSS | EOS | 2.6 km | MPC · JPL |
| 525845 | 2005 TL_{77} | — | October 6, 2005 | Catalina | CSS | · | 4.4 km | MPC · JPL |
| 525846 | 2005 TE_{78} | — | September 13, 2005 | Kitt Peak | Spacewatch | · | 820 m | MPC · JPL |
| 525847 | 2005 TR_{80} | — | October 3, 2005 | Kitt Peak | Spacewatch | H | 370 m | MPC · JPL |
| 525848 | 2005 TD_{82} | — | October 3, 2005 | Kitt Peak | Spacewatch | · | 3.0 km | MPC · JPL |
| 525849 | 2005 TT_{83} | — | October 3, 2005 | Kitt Peak | Spacewatch | EUN | 790 m | MPC · JPL |
| 525850 | 2005 TE_{91} | — | August 30, 2005 | Kitt Peak | Spacewatch | · | 960 m | MPC · JPL |
| 525851 | 2005 TE_{92} | — | October 6, 2005 | Kitt Peak | Spacewatch | · | 1.2 km | MPC · JPL |
| 525852 | 2005 TD_{93} | — | October 6, 2005 | Kitt Peak | Spacewatch | · | 620 m | MPC · JPL |
| 525853 | 2005 TQ_{94} | — | September 25, 2005 | Kitt Peak | Spacewatch | (5) | 820 m | MPC · JPL |
| 525854 | 2005 TN_{100} | — | October 7, 2005 | Mount Lemmon | Mount Lemmon Survey | · | 3.1 km | MPC · JPL |
| 525855 | 2005 TB_{108} | — | September 1, 2005 | Kitt Peak | Spacewatch | · | 2.2 km | MPC · JPL |
| 525856 | 2005 TD_{108} | — | September 29, 2005 | Kitt Peak | Spacewatch | · | 1.4 km | MPC · JPL |
| 525857 | 2005 TO_{108} | — | October 7, 2005 | Kitt Peak | Spacewatch | · | 1.1 km | MPC · JPL |
| 525858 | 2005 TV_{110} | — | October 7, 2005 | Kitt Peak | Spacewatch | · | 3.3 km | MPC · JPL |
| 525859 | 2005 TX_{111} | — | October 7, 2005 | Kitt Peak | Spacewatch | · | 2.2 km | MPC · JPL |
| 525860 | 2005 TW_{112} | — | September 27, 2005 | Kitt Peak | Spacewatch | · | 1.6 km | MPC · JPL |
| 525861 | 2005 TF_{114} | — | September 27, 2005 | Kitt Peak | Spacewatch | · | 510 m | MPC · JPL |
| 525862 | 2005 TK_{120} | — | September 29, 2005 | Mount Lemmon | Mount Lemmon Survey | · | 3.3 km | MPC · JPL |
| 525863 | 2005 TP_{120} | — | September 30, 2005 | Mount Lemmon | Mount Lemmon Survey | · | 1.3 km | MPC · JPL |
| 525864 | 2005 TK_{125} | — | October 7, 2005 | Kitt Peak | Spacewatch | EUN | 870 m | MPC · JPL |
| 525865 | 2005 TP_{126} | — | October 7, 2005 | Kitt Peak | Spacewatch | · | 860 m | MPC · JPL |
| 525866 | 2005 TC_{127} | — | October 7, 2005 | Kitt Peak | Spacewatch | · | 990 m | MPC · JPL |
| 525867 | 2005 TJ_{127} | — | September 25, 2005 | Kitt Peak | Spacewatch | · | 2.6 km | MPC · JPL |
| 525868 | 2005 TS_{128} | — | October 2, 2005 | Mount Lemmon | Mount Lemmon Survey | · | 2.1 km | MPC · JPL |
| 525869 | 2005 TX_{128} | — | September 30, 2005 | Mount Lemmon | Mount Lemmon Survey | CYB | 2.8 km | MPC · JPL |
| 525870 | 2005 TT_{129} | — | September 30, 2005 | Mount Lemmon | Mount Lemmon Survey | H | 480 m | MPC · JPL |
| 525871 | 2005 TB_{134} | — | October 10, 2005 | Catalina | CSS | · | 3.2 km | MPC · JPL |
| 525872 | 2005 TC_{135} | — | September 25, 2005 | Kitt Peak | Spacewatch | · | 470 m | MPC · JPL |
| 525873 | 2005 TG_{135} | — | October 5, 2005 | Kitt Peak | Spacewatch | HNS | 1.5 km | MPC · JPL |
| 525874 | 2005 TE_{137} | — | October 6, 2005 | Kitt Peak | Spacewatch | · | 2.6 km | MPC · JPL |
| 525875 | 2005 TF_{139} | — | October 8, 2005 | Kitt Peak | Spacewatch | HNS | 900 m | MPC · JPL |
| 525876 | 2005 TC_{144} | — | October 8, 2005 | Kitt Peak | Spacewatch | · | 2.4 km | MPC · JPL |
| 525877 | 2005 TU_{144} | — | October 8, 2005 | Kitt Peak | Spacewatch | · | 680 m | MPC · JPL |
| 525878 | 2005 TW_{144} | — | October 8, 2005 | Kitt Peak | Spacewatch | MAR | 830 m | MPC · JPL |
| 525879 | 2005 TS_{146} | — | October 8, 2005 | Kitt Peak | Spacewatch | HNS | 1.0 km | MPC · JPL |
| 525880 | 2005 TP_{147} | — | October 8, 2005 | Kitt Peak | Spacewatch | EUN | 1.0 km | MPC · JPL |
| 525881 | 2005 TA_{150} | — | October 8, 2005 | Kitt Peak | Spacewatch | · | 1.1 km | MPC · JPL |
| 525882 | 2005 TX_{150} | — | October 8, 2005 | Kitt Peak | Spacewatch | · | 2.7 km | MPC · JPL |
| 525883 | 2005 TP_{151} | — | October 9, 2005 | Kitt Peak | Spacewatch | · | 1.3 km | MPC · JPL |
| 525884 | 2005 TV_{151} | — | October 10, 2005 | Kitt Peak | Spacewatch | · | 1.5 km | MPC · JPL |
| 525885 | 2005 TN_{153} | — | October 7, 2005 | Mount Lemmon | Mount Lemmon Survey | EOS | 1.9 km | MPC · JPL |
| 525886 | 2005 TR_{159} | — | September 26, 2005 | Kitt Peak | Spacewatch | ADE | 1.7 km | MPC · JPL |
| 525887 | 2005 TY_{160} | — | October 9, 2005 | Kitt Peak | Spacewatch | · | 2.6 km | MPC · JPL |
| 525888 | 2005 TB_{161} | — | October 9, 2005 | Kitt Peak | Spacewatch | · | 600 m | MPC · JPL |
| 525889 | 2005 TC_{161} | — | October 9, 2005 | Kitt Peak | Spacewatch | ADE | 1.5 km | MPC · JPL |
| 525890 | 2005 TL_{161} | — | October 9, 2005 | Kitt Peak | Spacewatch | EOS | 1.7 km | MPC · JPL |
| 525891 | 2005 TB_{162} | — | October 9, 2005 | Kitt Peak | Spacewatch | · | 1.1 km | MPC · JPL |
| 525892 | 2005 TK_{162} | — | October 9, 2005 | Kitt Peak | Spacewatch | · | 2.1 km | MPC · JPL |
| 525893 | 2005 TL_{162} | — | October 9, 2005 | Kitt Peak | Spacewatch | MIS | 2.2 km | MPC · JPL |
| 525894 | 2005 TU_{167} | — | October 9, 2005 | Kitt Peak | Spacewatch | T_{j} (2.99) | 3.8 km | MPC · JPL |
| 525895 | 2005 TE_{168} | — | October 9, 2005 | Kitt Peak | Spacewatch | · | 1.3 km | MPC · JPL |
| 525896 | 2005 TD_{178} | — | May 28, 2004 | Kitt Peak | Spacewatch | · | 1.4 km | MPC · JPL |
| 525897 | 2005 TK_{182} | — | April 22, 2004 | Campo Imperatore | CINEOS | · | 1.6 km | MPC · JPL |
| 525898 | 2005 TL_{182} | — | October 3, 2005 | Catalina | CSS | · | 640 m | MPC · JPL |
| 525899 | 2005 TR_{185} | — | March 29, 2000 | Kitt Peak | Spacewatch | · | 1.1 km | MPC · JPL |
| 525900 | 2005 TZ_{194} | — | April 24, 2004 | Kitt Peak | Spacewatch | · | 1.1 km | MPC · JPL |

== 525901–526000 ==
back to top

| Designation | | | Discovery | | | Properties | | Ref |
| Permanent | Provisional | Named after | Date | Site | Discoverer(s) | Category | Diam. | Ref |
|---|---|---|---|---|---|---|---|---|
| 525901 | 2005 TK_{196} | — | October 11, 2005 | Kitt Peak | Spacewatch | · | 2.1 km | MPC · JPL |
| 525902 | 2005 TM_{197} | — | October 11, 2005 | Anderson Mesa | LONEOS | TIR | 2.4 km | MPC · JPL |
| 525903 | 2005 TQ_{198} | — | October 1, 2005 | Kitt Peak | Spacewatch | · | 780 m | MPC · JPL |
| 525904 | 2005 TX_{198} | — | October 1, 2005 | Mount Lemmon | Mount Lemmon Survey | · | 940 m | MPC · JPL |
| 525905 | 2005 TZ_{198} | — | October 1, 2005 | Mount Lemmon | Mount Lemmon Survey | · | 930 m | MPC · JPL |
| 525906 | 2005 TC_{199} | — | October 1, 2005 | Mount Lemmon | Mount Lemmon Survey | · | 2.3 km | MPC · JPL |
| 525907 | 2005 TG_{199} | — | October 1, 2005 | Catalina | CSS | · | 1.7 km | MPC · JPL |
| 525908 | 2005 TS_{199} | — | October 4, 2005 | Mount Lemmon | Mount Lemmon Survey | EOS | 2.0 km | MPC · JPL |
| 525909 | 2005 TT_{199} | — | October 6, 2005 | Mount Lemmon | Mount Lemmon Survey | · | 1.4 km | MPC · JPL |
| 525910 | 2005 UT_{7} | — | October 1, 2005 | Mount Lemmon | Mount Lemmon Survey | (5) | 1.1 km | MPC · JPL |
| 525911 | 2005 UJ_{11} | — | October 22, 2005 | Kitt Peak | Spacewatch | · | 2.3 km | MPC · JPL |
| 525912 | 2005 UQ_{11} | — | October 22, 2005 | Kitt Peak | Spacewatch | · | 1.2 km | MPC · JPL |
| 525913 | 2005 UV_{11} | — | October 22, 2005 | Kitt Peak | Spacewatch | BRG | 1.2 km | MPC · JPL |
| 525914 | 2005 UD_{21} | — | October 23, 2005 | Kitt Peak | Spacewatch | · | 1.2 km | MPC · JPL |
| 525915 | 2005 UH_{32} | — | October 24, 2005 | Kitt Peak | Spacewatch | THM | 2.3 km | MPC · JPL |
| 525916 | 2005 UA_{34} | — | October 24, 2005 | Kitt Peak | Spacewatch | · | 760 m | MPC · JPL |
| 525917 | 2005 UQ_{38} | — | October 24, 2005 | Kitt Peak | Spacewatch | · | 1.7 km | MPC · JPL |
| 525918 | 2005 UC_{41} | — | October 24, 2005 | Kitt Peak | Spacewatch | MAR | 1.1 km | MPC · JPL |
| 525919 | 2005 UR_{42} | — | October 22, 2005 | Kitt Peak | Spacewatch | · | 1.7 km | MPC · JPL |
| 525920 | 2005 UL_{43} | — | October 22, 2005 | Kitt Peak | Spacewatch | · | 1.6 km | MPC · JPL |
| 525921 | 2005 UT_{43} | — | October 6, 2005 | Anderson Mesa | LONEOS | · | 2.7 km | MPC · JPL |
| 525922 | 2005 UD_{51} | — | October 23, 2005 | Catalina | CSS | · | 2.6 km | MPC · JPL |
| 525923 | 2005 UY_{52} | — | October 10, 2005 | Catalina | CSS | · | 1.2 km | MPC · JPL |
| 525924 | 2005 US_{58} | — | October 25, 2005 | Kitt Peak | Spacewatch | · | 3.5 km | MPC · JPL |
| 525925 | 2005 UB_{59} | — | October 24, 2005 | Kitt Peak | Spacewatch | · | 1.5 km | MPC · JPL |
| 525926 | 2005 UX_{70} | — | September 30, 2005 | Catalina | CSS | · | 1.4 km | MPC · JPL |
| 525927 | 2005 UT_{74} | — | October 11, 2005 | Kitt Peak | Spacewatch | · | 1.6 km | MPC · JPL |
| 525928 | 2005 UF_{81} | — | October 25, 2005 | Mount Lemmon | Mount Lemmon Survey | · | 2.9 km | MPC · JPL |
| 525929 | 2005 UJ_{84} | — | October 22, 2005 | Kitt Peak | Spacewatch | EUN | 1.2 km | MPC · JPL |
| 525930 | 2005 UD_{85} | — | October 22, 2005 | Kitt Peak | Spacewatch | · | 460 m | MPC · JPL |
| 525931 | 2005 UJ_{86} | — | October 22, 2005 | Kitt Peak | Spacewatch | · | 2.5 km | MPC · JPL |
| 525932 | 2005 UP_{87} | — | October 22, 2005 | Kitt Peak | Spacewatch | · | 1.5 km | MPC · JPL |
| 525933 | 2005 UE_{90} | — | October 22, 2005 | Kitt Peak | Spacewatch | · | 1.5 km | MPC · JPL |
| 525934 | 2005 UX_{90} | — | October 22, 2005 | Kitt Peak | Spacewatch | · | 460 m | MPC · JPL |
| 525935 | 2005 UC_{93} | — | October 22, 2005 | Kitt Peak | Spacewatch | · | 1.4 km | MPC · JPL |
| 525936 | 2005 UM_{93} | — | October 22, 2005 | Kitt Peak | Spacewatch | · | 1.3 km | MPC · JPL |
| 525937 | 2005 UN_{94} | — | October 22, 2005 | Kitt Peak | Spacewatch | · | 1.1 km | MPC · JPL |
| 525938 | 2005 UY_{96} | — | October 22, 2005 | Kitt Peak | Spacewatch | · | 1.7 km | MPC · JPL |
| 525939 | 2005 UY_{97} | — | October 22, 2005 | Kitt Peak | Spacewatch | (1547) | 1.5 km | MPC · JPL |
| 525940 | 2005 UG_{99} | — | October 22, 2005 | Kitt Peak | Spacewatch | · | 1.1 km | MPC · JPL |
| 525941 | 2005 UG_{104} | — | October 22, 2005 | Kitt Peak | Spacewatch | · | 1.3 km | MPC · JPL |
| 525942 | 2005 UW_{104} | — | October 22, 2005 | Kitt Peak | Spacewatch | · | 1.1 km | MPC · JPL |
| 525943 | 2005 US_{105} | — | October 22, 2005 | Kitt Peak | Spacewatch | · | 1.1 km | MPC · JPL |
| 525944 | 2005 UY_{112} | — | October 22, 2005 | Kitt Peak | Spacewatch | · | 1.6 km | MPC · JPL |
| 525945 | 2005 UN_{113} | — | October 22, 2005 | Kitt Peak | Spacewatch | · | 1.4 km | MPC · JPL |
| 525946 | 2005 UE_{114} | — | September 30, 2005 | Mount Lemmon | Mount Lemmon Survey | · | 450 m | MPC · JPL |
| 525947 | 2005 UQ_{114} | — | October 22, 2005 | Palomar | NEAT | · | 1.5 km | MPC · JPL |
| 525948 | 2005 UV_{117} | — | October 24, 2005 | Kitt Peak | Spacewatch | · | 3.3 km | MPC · JPL |
| 525949 | 2005 UB_{119} | — | October 24, 2005 | Kitt Peak | Spacewatch | · | 1.3 km | MPC · JPL |
| 525950 | 2005 UT_{120} | — | October 24, 2005 | Anderson Mesa | LONEOS | H | 380 m | MPC · JPL |
| 525951 | 2005 UL_{125} | — | October 24, 2005 | Kitt Peak | Spacewatch | · | 1.3 km | MPC · JPL |
| 525952 | 2005 UL_{129} | — | October 24, 2005 | Kitt Peak | Spacewatch | · | 1.2 km | MPC · JPL |
| 525953 | 2005 UU_{129} | — | October 24, 2005 | Kitt Peak | Spacewatch | EUN | 1.1 km | MPC · JPL |
| 525954 | 2005 UW_{130} | — | October 24, 2005 | Kitt Peak | Spacewatch | · | 1.3 km | MPC · JPL |
| 525955 | 2005 UD_{133} | — | September 30, 2005 | Mount Lemmon | Mount Lemmon Survey | · | 490 m | MPC · JPL |
| 525956 | 2005 UL_{136} | — | October 11, 2005 | Kitt Peak | Spacewatch | · | 2.0 km | MPC · JPL |
| 525957 | 2005 UK_{137} | — | September 30, 2005 | Mount Lemmon | Mount Lemmon Survey | · | 2.1 km | MPC · JPL |
| 525958 | 2005 UO_{138} | — | October 25, 2005 | Mount Lemmon | Mount Lemmon Survey | · | 1.6 km | MPC · JPL |
| 525959 | 2005 UK_{139} | — | October 25, 2005 | Mount Lemmon | Mount Lemmon Survey | · | 2.4 km | MPC · JPL |
| 525960 | 2005 UO_{139} | — | October 25, 2005 | Mount Lemmon | Mount Lemmon Survey | · | 750 m | MPC · JPL |
| 525961 | 2005 UV_{139} | — | October 25, 2005 | Mount Lemmon | Mount Lemmon Survey | · | 680 m | MPC · JPL |
| 525962 | 2005 UQ_{140} | — | October 1, 2005 | Mount Lemmon | Mount Lemmon Survey | VER | 2.3 km | MPC · JPL |
| 525963 | 2005 UQ_{144} | — | October 26, 2005 | Kitt Peak | Spacewatch | · | 2.5 km | MPC · JPL |
| 525964 | 2005 UT_{144} | — | October 26, 2005 | Kitt Peak | Spacewatch | · | 960 m | MPC · JPL |
| 525965 | 2005 UG_{147} | — | October 26, 2005 | Kitt Peak | Spacewatch | · | 950 m | MPC · JPL |
| 525966 | 2005 UN_{161} | — | October 24, 2005 | Kitt Peak | Spacewatch | JUN | 770 m | MPC · JPL |
| 525967 | 2005 UU_{162} | — | October 9, 2005 | Kitt Peak | Spacewatch | · | 2.5 km | MPC · JPL |
| 525968 | 2005 UM_{164} | — | October 24, 2005 | Kitt Peak | Spacewatch | T_{j} (2.99) · EUP | 2.2 km | MPC · JPL |
| 525969 | 2005 UE_{171} | — | October 24, 2005 | Kitt Peak | Spacewatch | · | 410 m | MPC · JPL |
| 525970 | 2005 UY_{171} | — | October 24, 2005 | Kitt Peak | Spacewatch | · | 2.7 km | MPC · JPL |
| 525971 | 2005 UO_{174} | — | October 24, 2005 | Kitt Peak | Spacewatch | · | 2.6 km | MPC · JPL |
| 525972 | 2005 UE_{175} | — | October 24, 2005 | Kitt Peak | Spacewatch | · | 2.7 km | MPC · JPL |
| 525973 | 2005 UT_{175} | — | October 24, 2005 | Kitt Peak | Spacewatch | · | 2.4 km | MPC · JPL |
| 525974 | 2005 UM_{177} | — | October 24, 2005 | Kitt Peak | Spacewatch | HNS | 910 m | MPC · JPL |
| 525975 | 2005 UV_{178} | — | October 24, 2005 | Kitt Peak | Spacewatch | · | 1.0 km | MPC · JPL |
| 525976 | 2005 UH_{179} | — | October 24, 2005 | Kitt Peak | Spacewatch | JUN | 720 m | MPC · JPL |
| 525977 | 2005 UU_{179} | — | October 24, 2005 | Kitt Peak | Spacewatch | CYB | 3.7 km | MPC · JPL |
| 525978 | 2005 UY_{179} | — | October 24, 2005 | Kitt Peak | Spacewatch | EUN | 1.2 km | MPC · JPL |
| 525979 | 2005 UE_{180} | — | October 24, 2005 | Kitt Peak | Spacewatch | · | 1.5 km | MPC · JPL |
| 525980 | 2005 UL_{182} | — | October 24, 2005 | Kitt Peak | Spacewatch | PHO | 810 m | MPC · JPL |
| 525981 | 2005 UQ_{184} | — | October 25, 2005 | Mount Lemmon | Mount Lemmon Survey | EUN | 1.1 km | MPC · JPL |
| 525982 | 2005 UP_{185} | — | October 25, 2005 | Mount Lemmon | Mount Lemmon Survey | · | 960 m | MPC · JPL |
| 525983 | 2005 UA_{188} | — | June 27, 2004 | Kitt Peak | Spacewatch | · | 3.1 km | MPC · JPL |
| 525984 | 2005 UQ_{189} | — | October 27, 2005 | Mount Lemmon | Mount Lemmon Survey | · | 560 m | MPC · JPL |
| 525985 | 2005 UB_{190} | — | October 27, 2005 | Mount Lemmon | Mount Lemmon Survey | · | 1.3 km | MPC · JPL |
| 525986 | 2005 UJ_{192} | — | October 27, 2005 | Kitt Peak | Spacewatch | VER | 2.6 km | MPC · JPL |
| 525987 | 2005 UF_{196} | — | October 24, 2005 | Kitt Peak | Spacewatch | · | 3.3 km | MPC · JPL |
| 525988 | 2005 US_{198} | — | October 25, 2005 | Kitt Peak | Spacewatch | · | 1.4 km | MPC · JPL |
| 525989 | 2005 UO_{199} | — | October 25, 2005 | Kitt Peak | Spacewatch | · | 1.2 km | MPC · JPL |
| 525990 | 2005 UD_{206} | — | September 30, 2005 | Mount Lemmon | Mount Lemmon Survey | KON | 1.6 km | MPC · JPL |
| 525991 | 2005 UT_{207} | — | October 27, 2005 | Kitt Peak | Spacewatch | JUN | 860 m | MPC · JPL |
| 525992 | 2005 UC_{212} | — | October 27, 2005 | Kitt Peak | Spacewatch | NYS | 1.2 km | MPC · JPL |
| 525993 | 2005 UO_{217} | — | October 22, 2005 | Kitt Peak | Spacewatch | · | 850 m | MPC · JPL |
| 525994 | 2005 UJ_{219} | — | October 25, 2005 | Kitt Peak | Spacewatch | · | 1.6 km | MPC · JPL |
| 525995 | 2005 UL_{220} | — | February 13, 2002 | Apache Point | SDSS | · | 3.3 km | MPC · JPL |
| 525996 | 2005 UM_{220} | — | October 25, 2005 | Kitt Peak | Spacewatch | · | 1.1 km | MPC · JPL |
| 525997 | 2005 UY_{220} | — | October 25, 2005 | Kitt Peak | Spacewatch | · | 1.0 km | MPC · JPL |
| 525998 | 2005 UV_{225} | — | October 25, 2005 | Kitt Peak | Spacewatch | · | 1.5 km | MPC · JPL |
| 525999 | 2005 UM_{227} | — | October 25, 2005 | Kitt Peak | Spacewatch | · | 840 m | MPC · JPL |
| 526000 | 2005 UB_{232} | — | October 25, 2005 | Mount Lemmon | Mount Lemmon Survey | · | 1.3 km | MPC · JPL |

back to top
