= List of minor planets: 686001–687000 =

The following is a partial list of minor planets, running from minor-planet number 686001 through 687000, inclusive. The primary data for this and other partial lists is based on JPL's "Small-Body Orbital Elements" and data available from the Minor Planet Center. Critical list information is also provided by the MPC, unless otherwise specified from Lowell Observatory. A detailed description of the table's columns and additional sources are given on the main page including a complete list of every page in this series, and a statistical break-up on the dynamical classification of minor planets.

Also see the summary list of all named bodies in numerical and alphabetical order, and the corresponding naming citations for the number range of this particular list. New namings may only be added to this list after official publication, as the preannouncement of names is condemned by the Working Group for Small Bodies Nomenclature of the International Astronomical Union.

Near-Earth obj.	MBA (inner)	MBA (outer)	Centaur
Mars-crosser	MBA (middle)	Jupiter trojan	Trans-Neptunian obj.
Unclassified

== 686001–686100 ==
Designation			Discovery			Properties		Ref
Permanent	Provisional	Named after	Date	Site	Discoverer(s)	Category	Diam.	Ref
686001	2010 GY_{207}	—	April 9, 2010	Mount Lemmon	Mount Lemmon Survey	(32418)	1.5 km	MPC · JPL
686002	2010 GR_{212}	—	March 21, 2015	Haleakala	Pan-STARRS 1	·	1.4 km	MPC · JPL
686003	2010 HX_{76}	—	April 17, 2010	Mount Lemmon	Mount Lemmon Survey	·	1.7 km	MPC · JPL
686004	2010 HN_{103}	—	April 20, 2010	Kitt Peak	Spacewatch	·	1.6 km	MPC · JPL
686005	2010 HO_{105}	—	January 28, 2004	Kitt Peak	Spacewatch	·	1.8 km	MPC · JPL
686006	2010 HB_{128}	—	May 24, 2011	Haleakala	Pan-STARRS 1	·	1.3 km	MPC · JPL
686007	2010 HE_{131}	—	October 2, 2006	Mount Lemmon	Mount Lemmon Survey	·	1.6 km	MPC · JPL
686008	2010 JJ_{34}	—	May 6, 2003	Kitt Peak	Spacewatch	·	560 m	MPC · JPL
686009	2010 JF_{35}	—	November 20, 2008	Kitt Peak	Spacewatch	·	1.5 km	MPC · JPL
686010	2010 JH_{37}	—	May 8, 2010	Mount Lemmon	Mount Lemmon Survey	·	540 m	MPC · JPL
686011	2010 JW_{37}	—	April 9, 2010	Mount Lemmon	Mount Lemmon Survey	·	1.5 km	MPC · JPL
686012	2010 JF_{44}	—	April 9, 2010	Kitt Peak	Spacewatch	·	640 m	MPC · JPL
686013	2010 JQ_{48}	—	May 7, 2010	Mount Lemmon	Mount Lemmon Survey	·	1.5 km	MPC · JPL
686014	2010 JO_{76}	—	May 6, 2010	Kitt Peak	Spacewatch	·	750 m	MPC · JPL
686015	2010 JX_{77}	—	October 20, 2007	Mount Lemmon	Mount Lemmon Survey	·	1.8 km	MPC · JPL
686016	2010 JB_{121}	—	May 12, 2010	Kitt Peak	Spacewatch	·	740 m	MPC · JPL
686017	2010 JZ_{122}	—	May 12, 2010	Mount Lemmon	Mount Lemmon Survey	GAL	1.3 km	MPC · JPL
686018	2010 JF_{156}	—	May 11, 2010	Kitt Peak	Spacewatch	·	480 m	MPC · JPL
686019	2010 JN_{158}	—	May 14, 2010	Mount Lemmon	Mount Lemmon Survey	·	1.7 km	MPC · JPL
686020	2010 JS_{159}	—	May 5, 2010	Mount Lemmon	Mount Lemmon Survey	HOF	1.8 km	MPC · JPL
686021	2010 JS_{161}	—	May 7, 2010	Kitt Peak	Spacewatch	·	1.6 km	MPC · JPL
686022	2010 JW_{162}	—	May 8, 2010	Mount Lemmon	Mount Lemmon Survey	AGN	950 m	MPC · JPL
686023	2010 JZ_{162}	—	May 8, 2010	Mount Lemmon	Mount Lemmon Survey	HOF	1.9 km	MPC · JPL
686024	2010 JT_{165}	—	May 25, 2015	Haleakala	Pan-STARRS 1	KOR	990 m	MPC · JPL
686025	2010 JO_{167}	—	May 11, 2010	Mount Lemmon	Mount Lemmon Survey	·	1.7 km	MPC · JPL
686026	2010 JE_{168}	—	May 8, 2010	Mount Lemmon	Mount Lemmon Survey	·	1.3 km	MPC · JPL
686027	2010 JO_{170}	—	April 10, 2010	Mount Lemmon	Mount Lemmon Survey	·	1.3 km	MPC · JPL
686028	2010 JH_{179}	—	November 22, 2008	Kitt Peak	Spacewatch	MRX	1.0 km	MPC · JPL
686029	2010 JD_{197}	—	March 5, 2002	Anderson Mesa	LONEOS	·	1.3 km	MPC · JPL
686030	2010 JT_{215}	—	May 9, 2010	Mount Lemmon	Mount Lemmon Survey	·	1.6 km	MPC · JPL
686031	2010 KL_{37}	—	May 7, 2010	Mount Lemmon	Mount Lemmon Survey	·	1.7 km	MPC · JPL
686032	2010 KF_{39}	—	May 20, 2010	Kitt Peak	Spacewatch	·	1.7 km	MPC · JPL
686033	2010 KT_{127}	—	May 21, 2010	Mount Lemmon	Mount Lemmon Survey	EUN	1.3 km	MPC · JPL
686034	2010 KK_{140}	—	May 7, 2005	Mount Lemmon	Mount Lemmon Survey	·	2.5 km	MPC · JPL
686035	2010 KA_{141}	—	June 24, 2015	Haleakala	Pan-STARRS 1	·	1.3 km	MPC · JPL
686036	2010 KP_{143}	—	April 11, 2002	Palomar	NEAT	·	1.1 km	MPC · JPL
686037	2010 KF_{148}	—	November 30, 2011	Kitt Peak	Spacewatch	·	2.0 km	MPC · JPL
686038	2010 KW_{148}	—	January 11, 2008	Kitt Peak	Spacewatch	·	1.6 km	MPC · JPL
686039	2010 KL_{153}	—	October 8, 2012	Haleakala	Pan-STARRS 1	·	1.6 km	MPC · JPL
686040	2010 KQ_{156}	—	July 11, 2016	Haleakala	Pan-STARRS 1	·	2.1 km	MPC · JPL
686041	2010 KX_{157}	—	January 25, 2014	Haleakala	Pan-STARRS 1	·	1.8 km	MPC · JPL
686042	2010 KF_{158}	—	March 8, 2014	Mount Lemmon	Mount Lemmon Survey	AGN	1.0 km	MPC · JPL
686043	2010 LZ_{34}	—	June 7, 2010	Kitt Peak	Spacewatch	·	1.7 km	MPC · JPL
686044	2010 LX_{64}	—	June 11, 2010	Kitt Peak	Spacewatch	TIN	950 m	MPC · JPL
686045	2010 LP_{67}	—	May 11, 2010	Mount Lemmon	Mount Lemmon Survey	·	710 m	MPC · JPL
686046	2010 LY_{105}	—	August 26, 2003	Cerro Tololo	Deep Ecliptic Survey	·	1.0 km	MPC · JPL
686047	2010 LC_{107}	—	January 20, 2009	Kitt Peak	Spacewatch	·	1.8 km	MPC · JPL
686048	2010 LP_{107}	—	June 7, 2010	ESA OGS	ESA OGS	·	770 m	MPC · JPL
686049	2010 LG_{112}	—	October 11, 2007	Mount Lemmon	Mount Lemmon Survey	·	1.1 km	MPC · JPL
686050	2010 LY_{113}	—	June 5, 2010	Catalina	CSS	JUN	1.2 km	MPC · JPL
686051	2010 LU_{133}	—	May 11, 2010	Mount Lemmon	Mount Lemmon Survey	H	490 m	MPC · JPL
686052	2010 LX_{135}	—	July 28, 2014	Haleakala	Pan-STARRS 1	·	740 m	MPC · JPL
686053	2010 LW_{138}	—	March 10, 2016	Haleakala	Pan-STARRS 1	HYG	2.5 km	MPC · JPL
686054	2010 LD_{149}	—	May 23, 2014	Haleakala	Pan-STARRS 1	·	1.7 km	MPC · JPL
686055	2010 LJ_{158}	—	June 24, 2014	Haleakala	Pan-STARRS 1	V	440 m	MPC · JPL
686056	2010 MH_{112}	—	June 20, 2010	Mount Lemmon	Mount Lemmon Survey	MAS	570 m	MPC · JPL
686057	2010 MG_{129}	—	March 30, 2015	Haleakala	Pan-STARRS 1	·	1.4 km	MPC · JPL
686058	2010 NQ_{34}	—	August 10, 2015	Haleakala	Pan-STARRS 1	·	2.6 km	MPC · JPL
686059	2010 NE_{109}	—	April 15, 2010	Kitt Peak	Spacewatch	KON	1.9 km	MPC · JPL
686060	2010 NA_{119}	—	July 24, 2015	Haleakala	Pan-STARRS 1	·	1.7 km	MPC · JPL
686061	2010 NV_{125}	—	May 4, 2014	Mount Lemmon	Mount Lemmon Survey	·	2.2 km	MPC · JPL
686062	2010 NA_{127}	—	May 27, 2015	Cerro Tololo-DECam	DECam	HOF	2.1 km	MPC · JPL
686063	2010 NH_{132}	—	July 9, 2010	WISE	WISE	EUP	2.5 km	MPC · JPL
686064	2010 NY_{133}	—	April 15, 2010	Mount Lemmon	Mount Lemmon Survey	HOF	2.0 km	MPC · JPL
686065	2010 NL_{136}	—	October 18, 2012	Haleakala	Pan-STARRS 1	·	1.5 km	MPC · JPL
686066	2010 OB_{5}	—	October 1, 2003	Anderson Mesa	LONEOS	·	1.1 km	MPC · JPL
686067	2010 OE_{10}	—	July 16, 2010	·	WISE	·	2.4 km	MPC · JPL
686068	2010 OS_{11}	—	July 17, 2010	·	WISE	·	2.2 km	MPC · JPL
686069	2010 OX_{152}	—	July 25, 2015	Haleakala	Pan-STARRS 1	·	2.5 km	MPC · JPL
686070	2010 PD_{1}	—	July 19, 2010	La Sagra	OAM	·	1.5 km	MPC · JPL
686071	2010 PK_{1}	—	July 21, 2001	Palomar	NEAT	EUN	1.3 km	MPC · JPL
686072	2010 PA_{23}	—	July 8, 2003	Palomar	NEAT	·	730 m	MPC · JPL
686073	2010 PT_{66}	—	August 15, 2010	La Silla	La Silla	res · 1:3	259 km	MPC · JPL
686074	2010 PJ_{80}	—	August 12, 2010	Kitt Peak	Spacewatch	HOF	2.3 km	MPC · JPL
686075	2010 PA_{88}	—	September 12, 2016	Mount Lemmon	Mount Lemmon Survey	HOF	2.2 km	MPC · JPL
686076	2010 PF_{89}	—	December 29, 2017	Haleakala	Pan-STARRS 1	EOS	1.4 km	MPC · JPL
686077	2010 PJ_{92}	—	August 13, 2010	Kitt Peak	Spacewatch	·	840 m	MPC · JPL
686078	2010 PZ_{92}	—	August 12, 2010	Kitt Peak	Spacewatch	·	1.9 km	MPC · JPL
686079	2010 QE	—	February 1, 2009	Kitt Peak	Spacewatch	·	810 m	MPC · JPL
686080	2010 QO_{2}	—	August 30, 2010	Farra d'Isonzo	Farra d'Isonzo	NYS	550 m	MPC · JPL
686081	2010 QQ_{7}	—	August 18, 2010	Haleakala	Pan-STARRS 1	SDO	245 km	MPC · JPL
686082	2010 RJ	—	September 1, 2010	Mount Lemmon	Mount Lemmon Survey	·	1.0 km	MPC · JPL
686083	2010 RX	—	September 1, 2010	Mount Lemmon	Mount Lemmon Survey	·	1.2 km	MPC · JPL
686084	2010 RR_{8}	—	December 12, 2006	Kitt Peak	Spacewatch	KOR	1.1 km	MPC · JPL
686085	2010 RH_{14}	—	September 1, 2010	Mount Lemmon	Mount Lemmon Survey	KOR	1.1 km	MPC · JPL
686086	2010 RR_{17}	—	August 19, 2003	Campo Imperatore	CINEOS	V	610 m	MPC · JPL
686087	2010 RY_{23}	—	August 12, 2010	Kitt Peak	Spacewatch	·	1.3 km	MPC · JPL
686088	2010 RE_{32}	—	September 1, 2010	Mount Lemmon	Mount Lemmon Survey	·	1.6 km	MPC · JPL
686089	2010 RF_{32}	—	September 1, 2010	Mount Lemmon	Mount Lemmon Survey	·	1.8 km	MPC · JPL
686090	2010 RN_{32}	—	September 1, 2010	Mount Lemmon	Mount Lemmon Survey	EOS	1.5 km	MPC · JPL
686091	2010 RP_{33}	—	September 1, 2010	Mount Lemmon	Mount Lemmon Survey	·	980 m	MPC · JPL
686092	2010 RS_{34}	—	September 2, 2010	Mount Lemmon	Mount Lemmon Survey	·	960 m	MPC · JPL
686093	2010 RV_{37}	—	September 4, 2010	Taunus	Karge, S., R. Kling	·	1.1 km	MPC · JPL
686094	2010 RS_{38}	—	September 5, 2010	Mount Lemmon	Mount Lemmon Survey	·	930 m	MPC · JPL
686095	2010 RT_{41}	—	February 7, 2008	Kitt Peak	Spacewatch	KOR	1.3 km	MPC · JPL
686096	2010 RC_{43}	—	November 19, 2006	Kitt Peak	Spacewatch	·	1.8 km	MPC · JPL
686097	2010 RL_{47}	—	March 16, 2005	Mount Lemmon	Mount Lemmon Survey	V	630 m	MPC · JPL
686098	2010 RL_{57}	—	September 5, 2010	Mount Lemmon	Mount Lemmon Survey	·	2.0 km	MPC · JPL
686099	2010 RU_{57}	—	February 7, 2002	Kitt Peak	Spacewatch	EOS	1.5 km	MPC · JPL
686100	2010 RZ_{57}	—	September 5, 2010	Mount Lemmon	Mount Lemmon Survey	·	1.3 km	MPC · JPL

== 686101–686200 ==
back to top

Designation			Discovery			Properties		Ref
Permanent	Provisional	Named after	Date	Site	Discoverer(s)	Category	Diam.	Ref
686101	2010 RO_{61}	—	September 6, 2010	Kitt Peak	Spacewatch	MAS	660 m	MPC · JPL
686102	2010 RJ_{66}	—	October 20, 2016	Mount Lemmon	Mount Lemmon Survey	VER	2.1 km	MPC · JPL
686103	2010 RH_{68}	—	November 19, 2007	Kitt Peak	Spacewatch	·	760 m	MPC · JPL
686104	2010 RD_{71}	—	September 9, 2010	La Sagra	OAM	·	1.1 km	MPC · JPL
686105	2010 RK_{72}	—	November 25, 2006	Kitt Peak	Spacewatch	·	2.3 km	MPC · JPL
686106	2010 RC_{73}	—	September 10, 2010	Mayhill	Lowe, A.	·	1.0 km	MPC · JPL
686107	2010 RO_{74}	—	September 10, 2010	Mount Lemmon	Mount Lemmon Survey	·	1.0 km	MPC · JPL
686108	2010 RZ_{74}	—	September 5, 2010	Mount Lemmon	Mount Lemmon Survey	·	2.1 km	MPC · JPL
686109	2010 RG_{77}	—	September 11, 2010	Mount Lemmon	Mount Lemmon Survey	·	1.5 km	MPC · JPL
686110	2010 RH_{86}	—	September 2, 2010	Mount Lemmon	Mount Lemmon Survey	KOR	1.2 km	MPC · JPL
686111	2010 RR_{86}	—	September 2, 2010	Mount Lemmon	Mount Lemmon Survey	·	1.7 km	MPC · JPL
686112	2010 RU_{86}	—	September 13, 2005	Kitt Peak	Spacewatch	·	1.5 km	MPC · JPL
686113	2010 RY_{87}	—	September 3, 2010	Mount Lemmon	Mount Lemmon Survey	KOR	1.1 km	MPC · JPL
686114	2010 RB_{91}	—	September 10, 2010	Kitt Peak	Spacewatch	·	2.4 km	MPC · JPL
686115	2010 RG_{91}	—	September 10, 2010	Kitt Peak	Spacewatch	·	1.8 km	MPC · JPL
686116	2010 RX_{94}	—	September 12, 2010	Mount Lemmon	Mount Lemmon Survey	·	1.9 km	MPC · JPL
686117	2010 RM_{95}	—	September 12, 2010	Mount Lemmon	Mount Lemmon Survey	VER	2.3 km	MPC · JPL
686118	2010 RP_{95}	—	September 12, 2010	Mount Lemmon	Mount Lemmon Survey	·	1.8 km	MPC · JPL
686119	2010 RR_{105}	—	October 10, 1999	Kitt Peak	Spacewatch	·	2.4 km	MPC · JPL
686120	2010 RN_{108}	—	September 10, 2010	Mount Lemmon	Mount Lemmon Survey	EOS	1.7 km	MPC · JPL
686121	2010 RH_{111}	—	September 11, 2010	Kitt Peak	Spacewatch	·	2.5 km	MPC · JPL
686122	2010 RQ_{114}	—	October 27, 2005	Kitt Peak	Spacewatch	·	2.1 km	MPC · JPL
686123	2010 RH_{117}	—	September 11, 2010	Kitt Peak	Spacewatch	·	1.7 km	MPC · JPL
686124	2010 RB_{125}	—	September 12, 2010	Kitt Peak	Spacewatch	·	1.0 km	MPC · JPL
686125	2010 RZ_{126}	—	September 12, 2010	Kitt Peak	Spacewatch	V	600 m	MPC · JPL
686126	2010 RQ_{127}	—	August 14, 2010	Kitt Peak	Spacewatch	NYS	1.0 km	MPC · JPL
686127	2010 RY_{128}	—	September 3, 2010	Mount Lemmon	Mount Lemmon Survey	·	1.4 km	MPC · JPL
686128	2010 RV_{134}	—	February 7, 2003	La Silla	Barbieri, C.	AGN	1.1 km	MPC · JPL
686129	2010 RZ_{134}	—	November 1, 2005	Kitt Peak	Spacewatch	·	2.0 km	MPC · JPL
686130	2010 RB_{136}	—	August 20, 2006	Palomar	NEAT	·	1.0 km	MPC · JPL
686131	2010 RU_{140}	—	September 4, 2010	Mount Lemmon	Mount Lemmon Survey	MAS	620 m	MPC · JPL
686132	2010 RS_{149}	—	September 15, 2010	Kitt Peak	Spacewatch	·	1.5 km	MPC · JPL
686133	2010 RF_{150}	—	March 12, 2002	Kitt Peak	Spacewatch	·	2.3 km	MPC · JPL
686134	2010 RT_{151}	—	September 15, 2010	Kitt Peak	Spacewatch	EOS	1.3 km	MPC · JPL
686135	2010 RZ_{152}	—	September 15, 2010	Kitt Peak	Spacewatch	·	970 m	MPC · JPL
686136	2010 RB_{153}	—	September 15, 2010	Mount Lemmon	Mount Lemmon Survey	EOS	1.4 km	MPC · JPL
686137	2010 RK_{154}	—	September 15, 2010	Kitt Peak	Spacewatch	·	990 m	MPC · JPL
686138	2010 RK_{157}	—	September 15, 2010	Kitt Peak	Spacewatch	·	1.1 km	MPC · JPL
686139	2010 RA_{162}	—	September 4, 2010	Mount Lemmon	Mount Lemmon Survey	·	1.3 km	MPC · JPL
686140	2010 RF_{163}	—	September 5, 2010	Mount Lemmon	Mount Lemmon Survey	·	1.8 km	MPC · JPL
686141	2010 RD_{169}	—	September 2, 2010	Mount Lemmon	Mount Lemmon Survey	·	1.4 km	MPC · JPL
686142	2010 RE_{171}	—	September 4, 2010	Kitt Peak	Spacewatch	·	820 m	MPC · JPL
686143	2010 RL_{171}	—	September 4, 2010	Mount Lemmon	Mount Lemmon Survey	·	1.8 km	MPC · JPL
686144	2010 RQ_{176}	—	September 10, 2010	Kitt Peak	Spacewatch	KOR	1.2 km	MPC · JPL
686145	2010 RE_{178}	—	September 12, 2010	ESA OGS	ESA OGS	MAS	630 m	MPC · JPL
686146	2010 RO_{182}	—	September 30, 2010	Mount Lemmon	Mount Lemmon Survey	·	1.2 km	MPC · JPL
686147	2010 RR_{188}	—	September 11, 2010	Mount Lemmon	Mount Lemmon Survey	·	2.1 km	MPC · JPL
686148	2010 RE_{189}	—	August 23, 2003	Palomar	NEAT	·	540 m	MPC · JPL
686149	2010 RW_{189}	—	September 27, 2006	Mount Lemmon	Mount Lemmon Survey	·	1.6 km	MPC · JPL
686150	2010 RK_{190}	—	September 13, 2010	Haleakala	Pan-STARRS 1	plutino	307 km	MPC · JPL
686151	2010 RP_{190}	—	November 25, 2011	Haleakala	Pan-STARRS 1	·	2.3 km	MPC · JPL
686152	2010 RU_{191}	—	November 2, 2011	Mount Lemmon	Mount Lemmon Survey	·	2.6 km	MPC · JPL
686153	2010 RE_{192}	—	September 3, 2010	Mount Lemmon	Mount Lemmon Survey	·	1.7 km	MPC · JPL
686154	2010 RG_{192}	—	September 2, 2014	Haleakala	Pan-STARRS 1	·	990 m	MPC · JPL
686155	2010 RJ_{192}	—	November 24, 2011	Mount Lemmon	Mount Lemmon Survey	·	1.9 km	MPC · JPL
686156	2010 RZ_{193}	—	November 17, 2017	Mount Lemmon	Mount Lemmon Survey	·	2.6 km	MPC · JPL
686157	2010 RJ_{195}	—	September 11, 2010	Catalina	CSS	·	1.1 km	MPC · JPL
686158	2010 RP_{198}	—	March 12, 2013	Kitt Peak	Spacewatch	·	1.4 km	MPC · JPL
686159	2010 RR_{198}	—	June 23, 2015	Haleakala	Pan-STARRS 1	·	2.7 km	MPC · JPL
686160	2010 RL_{199}	—	January 20, 2018	Haleakala	Pan-STARRS 1	·	2.0 km	MPC · JPL
686161	2010 RO_{199}	—	January 10, 2018	Haleakala	Pan-STARRS 1	·	1.8 km	MPC · JPL
686162	2010 RE_{200}	—	October 8, 2016	Haleakala	Pan-STARRS 1	·	2.2 km	MPC · JPL
686163	2010 RN_{200}	—	November 27, 2011	Kitt Peak	Spacewatch	·	2.5 km	MPC · JPL
686164	2010 RO_{200}	—	December 24, 2017	Haleakala	Pan-STARRS 1	EOS	1.3 km	MPC · JPL
686165	2010 RA_{201}	—	September 5, 2010	Mount Lemmon	Mount Lemmon Survey	·	1.5 km	MPC · JPL
686166	2010 RC_{202}	—	July 17, 2016	Haleakala	Pan-STARRS 1	EMA	2.5 km	MPC · JPL
686167	2010 RE_{202}	—	May 28, 2014	Haleakala	Pan-STARRS 1	EOS	1.3 km	MPC · JPL
686168	2010 RL_{202}	—	May 21, 2014	Mount Lemmon	Mount Lemmon Survey	EOS	1.3 km	MPC · JPL
686169	2010 RR_{202}	—	January 16, 2018	Haleakala	Pan-STARRS 1	·	1.7 km	MPC · JPL
686170	2010 RV_{202}	—	May 7, 2014	Haleakala	Pan-STARRS 1	EOS	1.5 km	MPC · JPL
686171	2010 RW_{202}	—	December 29, 2017	Haleakala	Pan-STARRS 1	·	1.9 km	MPC · JPL
686172	2010 RO_{203}	—	October 2, 2016	Mount Lemmon	Mount Lemmon Survey	·	2.1 km	MPC · JPL
686173	2010 RH_{207}	—	December 10, 2014	Haleakala	Pan-STARRS 1	·	970 m	MPC · JPL
686174	2010 RQ_{207}	—	September 2, 2010	Mount Lemmon	Mount Lemmon Survey	·	1.7 km	MPC · JPL
686175	2010 RB_{208}	—	September 2, 2010	Mount Lemmon	Mount Lemmon Survey	·	1.7 km	MPC · JPL
686176	2010 RG_{209}	—	September 2, 2010	Mount Lemmon	Mount Lemmon Survey	·	1.9 km	MPC · JPL
686177	2010 RU_{209}	—	September 4, 2010	Mount Lemmon	Mount Lemmon Survey	·	1.5 km	MPC · JPL
686178	2010 RE_{210}	—	September 1, 2010	Mount Lemmon	Mount Lemmon Survey	·	1.4 km	MPC · JPL
686179	2010 RS_{212}	—	September 5, 2010	Mount Lemmon	Mount Lemmon Survey	HOF	2.0 km	MPC · JPL
686180	2010 RA_{214}	—	September 14, 2010	Kitt Peak	Spacewatch	·	1.1 km	MPC · JPL
686181	2010 RQ_{214}	—	September 2, 2010	Mount Lemmon	Mount Lemmon Survey	·	1.0 km	MPC · JPL
686182	2010 RC_{215}	—	September 4, 2010	Mount Lemmon	Mount Lemmon Survey	·	840 m	MPC · JPL
686183	2010 RD_{219}	—	September 11, 2010	Mount Lemmon	Mount Lemmon Survey	·	2.5 km	MPC · JPL
686184	2010 RO_{219}	—	September 3, 2010	Mount Lemmon	Mount Lemmon Survey	·	2.5 km	MPC · JPL
686185	2010 RR_{219}	—	September 4, 2010	Mount Lemmon	Mount Lemmon Survey	·	1.7 km	MPC · JPL
686186	2010 RT_{219}	—	September 10, 2010	Kitt Peak	Spacewatch	·	1.8 km	MPC · JPL
686187	2010 RL_{220}	—	September 3, 2010	Mount Lemmon	Mount Lemmon Survey	EOS	1.3 km	MPC · JPL
686188	2010 RS_{220}	—	September 14, 2010	Kitt Peak	Spacewatch	·	1.9 km	MPC · JPL
686189	2010 RE_{223}	—	August 10, 2010	Kitt Peak	Spacewatch	·	1.4 km	MPC · JPL
686190	2010 RR_{224}	—	September 4, 2010	Mount Lemmon	Mount Lemmon Survey	·	1.4 km	MPC · JPL
686191	2010 RT_{225}	—	January 18, 2012	Mount Lemmon	Mount Lemmon Survey	·	2.2 km	MPC · JPL
686192	2010 SJ_{1}	—	September 16, 2010	Mount Lemmon	Mount Lemmon Survey	EOS	1.3 km	MPC · JPL
686193	2010 SX_{1}	—	September 16, 2010	Mount Lemmon	Mount Lemmon Survey	EOS	1.3 km	MPC · JPL
686194	2010 SK_{4}	—	February 27, 2007	Kitt Peak	Spacewatch	·	2.3 km	MPC · JPL
686195	2010 SP_{4}	—	September 16, 2010	Kitt Peak	Spacewatch	EOS	1.7 km	MPC · JPL
686196	2010 SH_{5}	—	September 16, 2010	Mount Lemmon	Mount Lemmon Survey	·	1.6 km	MPC · JPL
686197	2010 ST_{7}	—	February 26, 2008	Mount Lemmon	Mount Lemmon Survey	·	2.0 km	MPC · JPL
686198	2010 SS_{10}	—	September 17, 2010	Mount Lemmon	Mount Lemmon Survey	·	2.8 km	MPC · JPL
686199	2010 SU_{10}	—	September 17, 2010	Bisei	BATTeRS	NYS	890 m	MPC · JPL
686200	2010 SE_{16}	—	September 29, 2010	Mount Lemmon	Mount Lemmon Survey	·	1.6 km	MPC · JPL

== 686201–686300 ==
back to top

Designation			Discovery			Properties		Ref
Permanent	Provisional	Named after	Date	Site	Discoverer(s)	Category	Diam.	Ref
686201	2010 SZ_{18}	—	September 27, 2010	Kitt Peak	Spacewatch	MAS	720 m	MPC · JPL
686202	2010 SF_{22}	—	April 25, 2006	Mount Lemmon	Mount Lemmon Survey	·	830 m	MPC · JPL
686203	2010 SZ_{24}	—	March 19, 2009	Kitt Peak	Spacewatch	·	1 km	MPC · JPL
686204	2010 SM_{29}	—	August 15, 2006	Palomar	NEAT	·	1.0 km	MPC · JPL
686205	2010 SX_{29}	—	September 29, 2010	La Sagra	OAM	PHO	790 m	MPC · JPL
686206	2010 SC_{32}	—	September 30, 2010	Mount Lemmon	Mount Lemmon Survey	V	440 m	MPC · JPL
686207	2010 ST_{34}	—	September 30, 2010	Mount Lemmon	Mount Lemmon Survey	·	1.0 km	MPC · JPL
686208	2010 SY_{34}	—	September 17, 2010	Kitt Peak	Spacewatch	·	1.4 km	MPC · JPL
686209	2010 SF_{40}	—	November 20, 2006	Kitt Peak	Spacewatch	·	1.6 km	MPC · JPL
686210	2010 SQ_{40}	—	October 9, 2005	Kitt Peak	Spacewatch	KOR	1.2 km	MPC · JPL
686211	2010 SE_{42}	—	September 17, 2010	Mount Lemmon	Mount Lemmon Survey	·	740 m	MPC · JPL
686212	2010 SQ_{44}	—	September 19, 2010	Kitt Peak	Spacewatch	·	1.9 km	MPC · JPL
686213	2010 SZ_{44}	—	September 16, 2010	Kitt Peak	Spacewatch	·	2.2 km	MPC · JPL
686214	2010 SL_{46}	—	September 18, 2010	Mount Lemmon	Mount Lemmon Survey	·	3.5 km	MPC · JPL
686215	2010 SA_{47}	—	February 10, 2013	Haleakala	Pan-STARRS 1	·	1.9 km	MPC · JPL
686216	2010 SM_{47}	—	February 7, 2013	Kitt Peak	Spacewatch	·	1.6 km	MPC · JPL
686217	2010 SB_{48}	—	March 6, 2013	Haleakala	Pan-STARRS 1	·	1.7 km	MPC · JPL
686218	2010 SM_{48}	—	September 30, 2010	Mount Lemmon	Mount Lemmon Survey	·	840 m	MPC · JPL
686219	2010 SS_{50}	—	December 14, 2015	Mount Lemmon	Mount Lemmon Survey	·	1.1 km	MPC · JPL
686220	2010 SZ_{50}	—	March 19, 2013	Haleakala	Pan-STARRS 1	·	1.9 km	MPC · JPL
686221	2010 SG_{51}	—	September 16, 2010	Kitt Peak	Spacewatch	·	1.2 km	MPC · JPL
686222	2010 SJ_{51}	—	September 9, 2015	Cerro Paranal	Altmann, M., Prusti, T.	·	2.0 km	MPC · JPL
686223	2010 SU_{52}	—	September 18, 2015	Mount Lemmon	Mount Lemmon Survey	·	1.5 km	MPC · JPL
686224	2010 SV_{52}	—	September 17, 2010	Mount Lemmon	Mount Lemmon Survey	·	2.2 km	MPC · JPL
686225	2010 SZ_{54}	—	September 18, 2010	Mount Lemmon	Mount Lemmon Survey	·	1.1 km	MPC · JPL
686226	2010 SV_{55}	—	September 18, 2010	Mount Lemmon	Mount Lemmon Survey	·	1.0 km	MPC · JPL
686227	2010 SY_{55}	—	September 16, 2010	Mount Lemmon	Mount Lemmon Survey	·	2.1 km	MPC · JPL
686228	2010 SX_{57}	—	September 18, 2010	Mount Lemmon	Mount Lemmon Survey	·	1.7 km	MPC · JPL
686229	2010 SY_{57}	—	September 18, 2010	Mount Lemmon	Mount Lemmon Survey	·	2.4 km	MPC · JPL
686230	2010 SA_{58}	—	September 17, 2010	Mount Lemmon	Mount Lemmon Survey	·	960 m	MPC · JPL
686231	2010 SE_{60}	—	September 17, 2010	Mount Lemmon	Mount Lemmon Survey	TEL	970 m	MPC · JPL
686232	2010 SP_{60}	—	September 17, 2010	Mount Lemmon	Mount Lemmon Survey	·	2.6 km	MPC · JPL
686233	2010 SN_{61}	—	September 16, 2010	Mount Lemmon	Mount Lemmon Survey	·	1.0 km	MPC · JPL
686234	2010 SJ_{63}	—	September 29, 2010	Mount Lemmon	Mount Lemmon Survey	·	2.0 km	MPC · JPL
686235	2010 SL_{63}	—	September 16, 2010	Mount Lemmon	Mount Lemmon Survey	·	1.5 km	MPC · JPL
686236	2010 SW_{63}	—	September 17, 2010	Mount Lemmon	Mount Lemmon Survey	·	1.9 km	MPC · JPL
686237	2010 SV_{64}	—	September 16, 2010	Kitt Peak	Spacewatch	·	790 m	MPC · JPL
686238	2010 SG_{66}	—	September 17, 2010	Mount Lemmon	Mount Lemmon Survey	·	1.5 km	MPC · JPL
686239	2010 TS_{5}	—	September 16, 2010	Kitt Peak	Spacewatch	·	1.1 km	MPC · JPL
686240	2010 TD_{6}	—	March 5, 2008	Mount Lemmon	Mount Lemmon Survey	·	1.7 km	MPC · JPL
686241	2010 TM_{7}	—	October 1, 2010	Kitt Peak	Spacewatch	KOR	1.2 km	MPC · JPL
686242	2010 TR_{7}	—	October 1, 2010	Kitt Peak	Spacewatch	·	1.6 km	MPC · JPL
686243	2010 TF_{9}	—	April 20, 2009	Mount Lemmon	Mount Lemmon Survey	·	970 m	MPC · JPL
686244	2010 TE_{26}	—	April 19, 2009	Mount Lemmon	Mount Lemmon Survey	EUN	860 m	MPC · JPL
686245	2010 TF_{28}	—	October 29, 2005	Mount Lemmon	Mount Lemmon Survey	·	1.6 km	MPC · JPL
686246	2010 TE_{31}	—	September 14, 2010	Kitt Peak	Spacewatch	·	1.5 km	MPC · JPL
686247	2010 TG_{42}	—	October 2, 2010	Kitt Peak	Spacewatch	·	1.4 km	MPC · JPL
686248	2010 TD_{43}	—	September 10, 2010	Kitt Peak	Spacewatch	·	2.4 km	MPC · JPL
686249	2010 TW_{45}	—	October 3, 2010	Kitt Peak	Spacewatch	KOR	1.2 km	MPC · JPL
686250	2010 TU_{60}	—	September 2, 2010	Mount Lemmon	Mount Lemmon Survey	·	1.8 km	MPC · JPL
686251	2010 TM_{61}	—	October 7, 2010	Mount Lemmon	Mount Lemmon Survey	·	2.2 km	MPC · JPL
686252	2010 TP_{61}	—	September 15, 2010	Mount Lemmon	Mount Lemmon Survey	·	2.1 km	MPC · JPL
686253	2010 TN_{69}	—	September 10, 2010	Kitt Peak	Spacewatch	EOS	1.3 km	MPC · JPL
686254	2010 TW_{74}	—	October 8, 2010	Kitt Peak	Spacewatch	KOR	1.0 km	MPC · JPL
686255	2010 TM_{76}	—	August 16, 2001	Palomar	NEAT	·	1.9 km	MPC · JPL
686256	2010 TB_{87}	—	February 13, 2008	Kitt Peak	Spacewatch	·	840 m	MPC · JPL
686257	2010 TY_{87}	—	October 1, 2010	Mount Lemmon	Mount Lemmon Survey	·	2.1 km	MPC · JPL
686258	2010 TU_{92}	—	September 2, 2010	Mount Lemmon	Mount Lemmon Survey	·	1.1 km	MPC · JPL
686259	2010 TH_{94}	—	October 31, 2005	Mount Lemmon	Mount Lemmon Survey	·	1.4 km	MPC · JPL
686260	2010 TH_{98}	—	October 9, 2010	Mount Lemmon	Mount Lemmon Survey	·	1.4 km	MPC · JPL
686261	2010 TE_{100}	—	October 1, 2010	Mount Lemmon	Mount Lemmon Survey	MAS	490 m	MPC · JPL
686262	2010 TL_{100}	—	October 1, 2010	Mount Lemmon	Mount Lemmon Survey	·	920 m	MPC · JPL
686263	2010 TF_{101}	—	October 1, 2005	Mount Lemmon	Mount Lemmon Survey	EOS	1.2 km	MPC · JPL
686264	2010 TO_{102}	—	September 30, 2010	Mount Lemmon	Mount Lemmon Survey	·	1.6 km	MPC · JPL
686265	2010 TK_{107}	—	October 9, 2010	Mount Lemmon	Mount Lemmon Survey	KOR	1.1 km	MPC · JPL
686266	2010 TP_{107}	—	September 4, 2010	Kitt Peak	Spacewatch	NYS	910 m	MPC · JPL
686267	2010 TF_{109}	—	October 9, 2010	Mount Lemmon	Mount Lemmon Survey	KOR	1.1 km	MPC · JPL
686268	2010 TB_{111}	—	October 9, 2010	Mount Lemmon	Mount Lemmon Survey	·	2.1 km	MPC · JPL
686269	2010 TO_{111}	—	September 10, 2010	Kitt Peak	Spacewatch	·	2.0 km	MPC · JPL
686270	2010 TY_{112}	—	August 30, 2005	Kitt Peak	Spacewatch	AGN	1.1 km	MPC · JPL
686271	2010 TE_{124}	—	October 10, 2010	Kitt Peak	Spacewatch	·	870 m	MPC · JPL
686272	2010 TS_{129}	—	October 11, 2010	Catalina	CSS	·	920 m	MPC · JPL
686273	2010 TZ_{132}	—	October 11, 2010	Mount Lemmon	Mount Lemmon Survey	·	1.8 km	MPC · JPL
686274	2010 TX_{136}	—	February 10, 2007	Mount Lemmon	Mount Lemmon Survey	EOS	1.4 km	MPC · JPL
686275	2010 TA_{137}	—	October 11, 2010	Mount Lemmon	Mount Lemmon Survey	·	1.4 km	MPC · JPL
686276	2010 TF_{137}	—	October 11, 2010	Mount Lemmon	Mount Lemmon Survey	·	1.9 km	MPC · JPL
686277	2010 TG_{138}	—	October 11, 2010	Mount Lemmon	Mount Lemmon Survey	·	2.0 km	MPC · JPL
686278	2010 TP_{142}	—	October 11, 2010	Mount Lemmon	Mount Lemmon Survey	·	1.9 km	MPC · JPL
686279	2010 TW_{148}	—	October 12, 2010	Vail-Jarnac	Glinos, T.	·	3.2 km	MPC · JPL
686280	2010 TP_{159}	—	March 11, 2008	Kitt Peak	Spacewatch	·	1.6 km	MPC · JPL
686281	2010 TN_{160}	—	October 10, 2010	Mount Lemmon	Mount Lemmon Survey	·	740 m	MPC · JPL
686282	2010 TQ_{165}	—	September 29, 2010	Mount Lemmon	Mount Lemmon Survey	NYS	990 m	MPC · JPL
686283	2010 TX_{178}	—	October 1, 2010	Mount Lemmon	Mount Lemmon Survey	·	2.1 km	MPC · JPL
686284	2010 TQ_{187}	—	October 25, 2005	Mount Lemmon	Mount Lemmon Survey	EOS	1.3 km	MPC · JPL
686285	2010 TU_{194}	—	September 3, 2010	Mount Lemmon	Mount Lemmon Survey	EOS	1.5 km	MPC · JPL
686286	2010 TX_{196}	—	February 1, 2012	Catalina	CSS	·	2.3 km	MPC · JPL
686287	2010 TU_{197}	—	January 31, 2012	Catalina	CSS	·	2.6 km	MPC · JPL
686288	2010 TP_{198}	—	March 19, 2013	Haleakala	Pan-STARRS 1	·	2.6 km	MPC · JPL
686289	2010 TG_{199}	—	October 13, 2010	Mount Lemmon	Mount Lemmon Survey	·	2.4 km	MPC · JPL
686290	2010 TV_{201}	—	October 11, 2010	Mount Lemmon	Mount Lemmon Survey	·	2.8 km	MPC · JPL
686291	2010 TK_{204}	—	October 13, 2010	Mount Lemmon	Mount Lemmon Survey	·	1.7 km	MPC · JPL
686292	2010 TX_{204}	—	March 13, 2013	Haleakala	Pan-STARRS 1	·	2.0 km	MPC · JPL
686293	2010 TJ_{205}	—	March 4, 2013	Haleakala	Pan-STARRS 1	·	2.1 km	MPC · JPL
686294	2010 TT_{205}	—	October 10, 2016	Mount Lemmon	Mount Lemmon Survey	·	2.9 km	MPC · JPL
686295	2010 TV_{205}	—	May 23, 2014	Haleakala	Pan-STARRS 1	·	1.9 km	MPC · JPL
686296	2010 TM_{206}	—	February 21, 2017	Haleakala	Pan-STARRS 1	·	1.2 km	MPC · JPL
686297	2010 TN_{207}	—	January 16, 2018	Haleakala	Pan-STARRS 1	·	1.8 km	MPC · JPL
686298	2010 TR_{207}	—	August 10, 2015	Haleakala	Pan-STARRS 1	·	2.0 km	MPC · JPL
686299	2010 TS_{207}	—	May 23, 2014	Haleakala	Pan-STARRS 1	·	1.5 km	MPC · JPL
686300	2010 TH_{208}	—	June 27, 2015	Haleakala	Pan-STARRS 1	EOS	1.3 km	MPC · JPL

== 686301–686400 ==
back to top

Designation			Discovery			Properties		Ref
Permanent	Provisional	Named after	Date	Site	Discoverer(s)	Category	Diam.	Ref
686301	2010 TB_{210}	—	October 14, 2010	Mount Lemmon	Mount Lemmon Survey	·	2.3 km	MPC · JPL
686302	2010 TM_{212}	—	October 9, 2010	Kitt Peak	Spacewatch	·	1.8 km	MPC · JPL
686303	2010 TX_{213}	—	October 12, 2010	Mount Lemmon	Mount Lemmon Survey	·	2.0 km	MPC · JPL
686304	2010 TT_{214}	—	October 1, 2010	Mount Lemmon	Mount Lemmon Survey	·	1.2 km	MPC · JPL
686305	2010 TW_{214}	—	October 11, 2010	Mount Lemmon	Mount Lemmon Survey	·	2.2 km	MPC · JPL
686306	2010 TX_{214}	—	October 12, 2010	Mount Lemmon	Mount Lemmon Survey	EOS	1.3 km	MPC · JPL
686307	2010 TZ_{214}	—	October 13, 2010	Mount Lemmon	Mount Lemmon Survey	·	2.8 km	MPC · JPL
686308	2010 TB_{215}	—	October 2, 2010	Mount Lemmon	Mount Lemmon Survey	EOS	1.3 km	MPC · JPL
686309	2010 TG_{215}	—	October 13, 2010	Mount Lemmon	Mount Lemmon Survey	·	2.0 km	MPC · JPL
686310	2010 TH_{215}	—	October 14, 2010	Mount Lemmon	Mount Lemmon Survey	·	2.0 km	MPC · JPL
686311	2010 TP_{215}	—	October 2, 2010	Kitt Peak	Spacewatch	·	1.4 km	MPC · JPL
686312	2010 TD_{218}	—	October 13, 2010	Mount Lemmon	Mount Lemmon Survey	TEL	950 m	MPC · JPL
686313	2010 TH_{218}	—	October 13, 2010	Mount Lemmon	Mount Lemmon Survey	·	2.4 km	MPC · JPL
686314	2010 TL_{218}	—	October 13, 2010	Mount Lemmon	Mount Lemmon Survey	·	2.0 km	MPC · JPL
686315	2010 TZ_{218}	—	October 13, 2010	Mount Lemmon	Mount Lemmon Survey	·	2.0 km	MPC · JPL
686316	2010 TK_{220}	—	October 13, 2010	Mount Lemmon	Mount Lemmon Survey	·	2.1 km	MPC · JPL
686317	2010 TO_{221}	—	October 11, 2010	Mount Lemmon	Mount Lemmon Survey	EOS	1.6 km	MPC · JPL
686318	2010 TX_{221}	—	October 12, 2010	Mount Lemmon	Mount Lemmon Survey	L4	7.2 km	MPC · JPL
686319	2010 TM_{224}	—	October 3, 2010	Kitt Peak	Spacewatch	·	2.0 km	MPC · JPL
686320	2010 TA_{227}	—	October 9, 2010	Catalina	CSS	·	980 m	MPC · JPL
686321	2010 TQ_{227}	—	October 12, 2010	Mount Lemmon	Mount Lemmon Survey	·	940 m	MPC · JPL
686322	2010 TF_{228}	—	October 13, 2010	Mount Lemmon	Mount Lemmon Survey	VER	2.2 km	MPC · JPL
686323	2010 TY_{229}	—	October 14, 2010	Mount Lemmon	Mount Lemmon Survey	·	1.8 km	MPC · JPL
686324	2010 TE_{231}	—	October 14, 2010	Mount Lemmon	Mount Lemmon Survey	·	1.9 km	MPC · JPL
686325	2010 TS_{231}	—	October 13, 2010	Kitt Peak	Spacewatch	·	1.8 km	MPC · JPL
686326	2010 TB_{232}	—	October 13, 2010	Mount Lemmon	Mount Lemmon Survey	·	2.7 km	MPC · JPL
686327	2010 TJ_{232}	—	October 1, 2010	Mount Lemmon	Mount Lemmon Survey	·	1.7 km	MPC · JPL
686328	2010 TL_{233}	—	June 8, 2019	Haleakala	Pan-STARRS 1	·	1.3 km	MPC · JPL
686329	2010 TA_{236}	—	October 12, 2010	Mount Lemmon	Mount Lemmon Survey	·	770 m	MPC · JPL
686330	2010 TR_{237}	—	October 10, 2010	Kitt Peak	Spacewatch	·	890 m	MPC · JPL
686331	2010 UE_{2}	—	September 16, 2006	Kitt Peak	Spacewatch	NYS	890 m	MPC · JPL
686332	2010 UW_{2}	—	September 17, 2010	Mount Lemmon	Mount Lemmon Survey	EUP	2.7 km	MPC · JPL
686333	2010 UW_{9}	—	August 28, 2006	Anderson Mesa	LONEOS	MAS	670 m	MPC · JPL
686334	2010 UP_{20}	—	October 28, 2010	Mount Lemmon	Mount Lemmon Survey	KOR	1.0 km	MPC · JPL
686335	2010 UU_{23}	—	October 28, 2010	Mount Lemmon	Mount Lemmon Survey	·	2.7 km	MPC · JPL
686336	2010 UM_{28}	—	October 28, 2010	Mount Lemmon	Mount Lemmon Survey	·	2.0 km	MPC · JPL
686337	2010 UP_{28}	—	October 28, 2010	Mount Lemmon	Mount Lemmon Survey	LIX	2.8 km	MPC · JPL
686338	2010 UV_{36}	—	October 29, 2010	Mount Lemmon	Mount Lemmon Survey	·	1.1 km	MPC · JPL
686339	2010 UP_{38}	—	October 29, 2010	Piszkés-tető	K. Sárneczky, S. Kürti	·	1.9 km	MPC · JPL
686340	2010 US_{42}	—	October 30, 2010	Mount Lemmon	Mount Lemmon Survey	·	1.6 km	MPC · JPL
686341	2010 UV_{44}	—	March 16, 2007	Mount Lemmon	Mount Lemmon Survey	·	2.3 km	MPC · JPL
686342	2010 UJ_{45}	—	October 13, 2010	Mount Lemmon	Mount Lemmon Survey	·	830 m	MPC · JPL
686343	2010 UZ_{47}	—	September 17, 2010	Mount Lemmon	Mount Lemmon Survey	·	1.0 km	MPC · JPL
686344	2010 UB_{48}	—	October 30, 2010	Piszkés-tető	K. Sárneczky, Z. Kuli	·	2.2 km	MPC · JPL
686345	2010 UH_{65}	—	March 4, 2017	Haleakala	Pan-STARRS 1	·	1.3 km	MPC · JPL
686346	2010 UK_{67}	—	October 31, 2010	Mount Lemmon	Mount Lemmon Survey	·	1.6 km	MPC · JPL
686347	2010 UA_{72}	—	September 18, 2010	Mount Lemmon	Mount Lemmon Survey	·	2.0 km	MPC · JPL
686348	2010 UH_{75}	—	October 30, 2010	Mount Lemmon	Mount Lemmon Survey	·	1.9 km	MPC · JPL
686349	2010 UM_{82}	—	August 28, 2006	Kitt Peak	Spacewatch	·	1.2 km	MPC · JPL
686350	2010 UL_{84}	—	October 9, 2010	Mount Lemmon	Mount Lemmon Survey	·	1.6 km	MPC · JPL
686351	2010 UB_{91}	—	September 27, 2006	Mount Lemmon	Mount Lemmon Survey	·	1.0 km	MPC · JPL
686352	2010 UK_{91}	—	October 31, 2010	Kitt Peak	Spacewatch	·	2.7 km	MPC · JPL
686353	2010 UU_{99}	—	September 11, 2010	Mount Lemmon	Mount Lemmon Survey	·	2.3 km	MPC · JPL
686354	2010 UK_{104}	—	November 2, 2010	Mount Lemmon	Mount Lemmon Survey	·	2.1 km	MPC · JPL
686355	2010 UK_{107}	—	November 3, 2010	Mount Lemmon	Mount Lemmon Survey	·	1.6 km	MPC · JPL
686356	2010 UR_{109}	—	October 29, 2010	Kitt Peak	Spacewatch	·	2.9 km	MPC · JPL
686357	2010 UU_{109}	—	October 31, 2010	Kitt Peak	Spacewatch	·	2.4 km	MPC · JPL
686358	2010 UB_{111}	—	October 17, 2010	Mount Lemmon	Mount Lemmon Survey	3:2	4.6 km	MPC · JPL
686359	2010 UA_{112}	—	October 29, 2010	Kitt Peak	Spacewatch	·	1.7 km	MPC · JPL
686360	2010 UL_{112}	—	April 10, 2013	Haleakala	Pan-STARRS 1	·	2.4 km	MPC · JPL
686361	2010 UV_{112}	—	January 25, 2006	Kitt Peak	Spacewatch	·	2.2 km	MPC · JPL
686362	2010 UA_{113}	—	October 30, 2010	Mount Lemmon	Mount Lemmon Survey	·	2.5 km	MPC · JPL
686363	2010 UJ_{113}	—	October 28, 2010	Mount Lemmon	Mount Lemmon Survey	·	2.5 km	MPC · JPL
686364	2010 UN_{116}	—	October 30, 2010	Mount Lemmon	Mount Lemmon Survey	·	900 m	MPC · JPL
686365	2010 UU_{116}	—	January 12, 2018	Haleakala	Pan-STARRS 1	·	2.3 km	MPC · JPL
686366	2010 UW_{117}	—	October 29, 2010	Mount Lemmon	Mount Lemmon Survey	·	2.5 km	MPC · JPL
686367	2010 UX_{117}	—	October 31, 2010	Mount Lemmon	Mount Lemmon Survey	·	2.0 km	MPC · JPL
686368	2010 UN_{120}	—	October 31, 2010	Mount Lemmon	Mount Lemmon Survey	·	1.8 km	MPC · JPL
686369	2010 UW_{120}	—	October 17, 2010	Mount Lemmon	Mount Lemmon Survey	·	2.2 km	MPC · JPL
686370	2010 UY_{120}	—	October 30, 2010	Mount Lemmon	Mount Lemmon Survey	(5)	830 m	MPC · JPL
686371	2010 UQ_{121}	—	October 29, 2010	Mount Lemmon	Mount Lemmon Survey	·	2.4 km	MPC · JPL
686372	2010 UR_{121}	—	October 28, 2010	Mount Lemmon	Mount Lemmon Survey	·	2.1 km	MPC · JPL
686373	2010 UE_{122}	—	October 31, 2010	Kitt Peak	Spacewatch	·	2.9 km	MPC · JPL
686374	2010 UX_{122}	—	October 30, 2010	Mount Lemmon	Mount Lemmon Survey	·	2.1 km	MPC · JPL
686375	2010 UQ_{123}	—	October 30, 2010	Mount Lemmon	Mount Lemmon Survey	·	3.6 km	MPC · JPL
686376	2010 UR_{123}	—	October 30, 2010	Mount Lemmon	Mount Lemmon Survey	EOS	1.5 km	MPC · JPL
686377	2010 UG_{124}	—	October 29, 2010	Mount Lemmon	Mount Lemmon Survey	·	1.9 km	MPC · JPL
686378	2010 UZ_{126}	—	October 30, 2010	Mount Lemmon	Mount Lemmon Survey	·	2.3 km	MPC · JPL
686379	2010 UE_{127}	—	October 28, 2010	Mount Lemmon	Mount Lemmon Survey	·	2.5 km	MPC · JPL
686380	2010 UE_{130}	—	October 19, 2010	Mount Lemmon	Mount Lemmon Survey	·	2.8 km	MPC · JPL
686381	2010 UE_{132}	—	October 17, 2010	Mount Lemmon	Mount Lemmon Survey	·	2.3 km	MPC · JPL
686382	2010 UJ_{132}	—	October 17, 2010	Mount Lemmon	Mount Lemmon Survey	·	2.0 km	MPC · JPL
686383	2010 UL_{132}	—	October 31, 2010	Mount Lemmon	Mount Lemmon Survey	URS	2.0 km	MPC · JPL
686384	2010 UW_{132}	—	October 30, 2010	Kitt Peak	Spacewatch	·	2.9 km	MPC · JPL
686385	2010 UJ_{133}	—	October 30, 2010	Mount Lemmon	Mount Lemmon Survey	·	2.4 km	MPC · JPL
686386	2010 UK_{133}	—	October 17, 2010	Mount Lemmon	Mount Lemmon Survey	·	2.0 km	MPC · JPL
686387	2010 UR_{133}	—	October 29, 2010	Mount Lemmon	Mount Lemmon Survey	ARM	2.4 km	MPC · JPL
686388	2010 UH_{135}	—	April 30, 2008	Mount Lemmon	Mount Lemmon Survey	EOS	1.5 km	MPC · JPL
686389	2010 UM_{136}	—	January 1, 2012	Mount Lemmon	Mount Lemmon Survey	EOS	1.5 km	MPC · JPL
686390	2010 VP_{1}	—	October 13, 2010	Mount Lemmon	Mount Lemmon Survey	T_{j} (2.98) · EUP	2.9 km	MPC · JPL
686391	2010 VQ_{3}	—	November 1, 2010	Mount Lemmon	Mount Lemmon Survey	·	2.4 km	MPC · JPL
686392	2010 VD_{6}	—	March 10, 2007	Mount Lemmon	Mount Lemmon Survey	·	2.7 km	MPC · JPL
686393	2010 VP_{12}	—	October 17, 2010	Mount Lemmon	Mount Lemmon Survey	·	760 m	MPC · JPL
686394	2010 VR_{12}	—	September 17, 2010	Mount Lemmon	Mount Lemmon Survey	PHO	750 m	MPC · JPL
686395	2010 VO_{30}	—	November 3, 2010	Catalina	CSS	·	2.2 km	MPC · JPL
686396	2010 VK_{31}	—	November 3, 2010	Mount Lemmon	Mount Lemmon Survey	·	2.2 km	MPC · JPL
686397	2010 VL_{39}	—	November 5, 2010	La Sagra	OAM	·	2.2 km	MPC · JPL
686398	2010 VW_{50}	—	October 11, 2010	Kitt Peak	Spacewatch	·	2.2 km	MPC · JPL
686399	2010 VF_{53}	—	November 3, 2010	Mount Lemmon	Mount Lemmon Survey	·	710 m	MPC · JPL
686400	2010 VG_{54}	—	September 11, 2010	Mount Lemmon	Mount Lemmon Survey	·	2.3 km	MPC · JPL

== 686401–686500 ==
back to top

Designation			Discovery			Properties		Ref
Permanent	Provisional	Named after	Date	Site	Discoverer(s)	Category	Diam.	Ref
686401	2010 VR_{55}	—	September 3, 2010	Mount Lemmon	Mount Lemmon Survey	·	1.8 km	MPC · JPL
686402	2010 VU_{56}	—	November 3, 2010	Mount Lemmon	Mount Lemmon Survey	·	2.5 km	MPC · JPL
686403	2010 VE_{58}	—	November 4, 2010	Mount Lemmon	Mount Lemmon Survey	·	1.9 km	MPC · JPL
686404	2010 VL_{59}	—	October 13, 2010	Mount Lemmon	Mount Lemmon Survey	·	2.6 km	MPC · JPL
686405	2010 VD_{64}	—	November 6, 2010	Mount Lemmon	Mount Lemmon Survey	·	1.4 km	MPC · JPL
686406	2010 VU_{84}	—	November 5, 2010	Kitt Peak	Spacewatch	AEG	2.2 km	MPC · JPL
686407	2010 VG_{85}	—	November 5, 2010	Kitt Peak	Spacewatch	VER	2.1 km	MPC · JPL
686408	2010 VT_{92}	—	October 31, 2010	Mount Lemmon	Mount Lemmon Survey	·	1.5 km	MPC · JPL
686409	2010 VT_{96}	—	October 31, 2010	Kitt Peak	Spacewatch	·	1.1 km	MPC · JPL
686410	2010 VE_{102}	—	November 5, 2010	Kitt Peak	Spacewatch	·	1.4 km	MPC · JPL
686411	2010 VO_{105}	—	November 5, 2010	Mount Lemmon	Mount Lemmon Survey	·	910 m	MPC · JPL
686412	2010 VQ_{125}	—	November 8, 2010	Kitt Peak	Spacewatch	·	950 m	MPC · JPL
686413	2010 VL_{126}	—	November 8, 2010	Kitt Peak	Spacewatch	EOS	1.4 km	MPC · JPL
686414	2010 VC_{135}	—	November 5, 2010	Kitt Peak	Spacewatch	·	2.1 km	MPC · JPL
686415	2010 VR_{136}	—	October 14, 2010	Mount Lemmon	Mount Lemmon Survey	·	2.4 km	MPC · JPL
686416	2010 VX_{137}	—	November 11, 2010	Kitt Peak	Spacewatch	·	1.9 km	MPC · JPL
686417	2010 VT_{138}	—	November 4, 2010	La Sagra	OAM	·	3.0 km	MPC · JPL
686418	2010 VQ_{140}	—	November 5, 2010	Mount Lemmon	Mount Lemmon Survey	·	980 m	MPC · JPL
686419	2010 VZ_{141}	—	November 6, 2010	Mount Lemmon	Mount Lemmon Survey	·	2.6 km	MPC · JPL
686420	2010 VB_{146}	—	November 6, 2010	Mount Lemmon	Mount Lemmon Survey	·	710 m	MPC · JPL
686421	2010 VE_{149}	—	November 6, 2010	Mount Lemmon	Mount Lemmon Survey	EOS	1.4 km	MPC · JPL
686422	2010 VM_{150}	—	November 6, 2010	Mount Lemmon	Mount Lemmon Survey	·	950 m	MPC · JPL
686423	2010 VO_{156}	—	October 30, 2010	Kitt Peak	Spacewatch	·	2.4 km	MPC · JPL
686424	2010 VO_{157}	—	October 13, 2010	Mount Lemmon	Mount Lemmon Survey	·	930 m	MPC · JPL
686425	2010 VZ_{161}	—	November 10, 2010	Kitt Peak	Spacewatch	·	2.0 km	MPC · JPL
686426	2010 VP_{163}	—	November 10, 2010	Kitt Peak	Spacewatch	·	2.4 km	MPC · JPL
686427	2010 VO_{166}	—	November 10, 2010	Mount Lemmon	Mount Lemmon Survey	·	2.8 km	MPC · JPL
686428	2010 VY_{169}	—	November 10, 2010	Mount Lemmon	Mount Lemmon Survey	VER	2.1 km	MPC · JPL
686429	2010 VP_{170}	—	November 1, 2010	Kitt Peak	Spacewatch	·	2.5 km	MPC · JPL
686430	2010 VO_{172}	—	November 10, 2010	Mount Lemmon	Mount Lemmon Survey	·	1.4 km	MPC · JPL
686431	2010 VA_{182}	—	November 11, 2010	Mount Lemmon	Mount Lemmon Survey	·	1.4 km	MPC · JPL
686432	2010 VJ_{184}	—	November 13, 2010	Mount Lemmon	Mount Lemmon Survey	·	2.5 km	MPC · JPL
686433	2010 VW_{186}	—	June 21, 2009	Mount Lemmon	Mount Lemmon Survey	T_{j} (2.94)	4.7 km	MPC · JPL
686434	2010 VO_{187}	—	November 13, 2010	Mount Lemmon	Mount Lemmon Survey	·	2.4 km	MPC · JPL
686435	2010 VY_{192}	—	November 11, 2010	Mount Lemmon	Mount Lemmon Survey	·	1.3 km	MPC · JPL
686436	2010 VA_{194}	—	November 13, 2010	Mount Lemmon	Mount Lemmon Survey	·	2.1 km	MPC · JPL
686437	2010 VW_{195}	—	November 12, 2010	Mount Lemmon	Mount Lemmon Survey	VER	2.2 km	MPC · JPL
686438	2010 VL_{207}	—	October 17, 2010	Mount Lemmon	Mount Lemmon Survey	·	530 m	MPC · JPL
686439	2010 VC_{208}	—	October 29, 2010	Kitt Peak	Spacewatch	EOS	1.5 km	MPC · JPL
686440	2010 VC_{209}	—	November 4, 2010	Mount Lemmon	Mount Lemmon Survey	·	2.4 km	MPC · JPL
686441	2010 VA_{210}	—	November 3, 2010	Mount Lemmon	Mount Lemmon Survey	·	2.6 km	MPC · JPL
686442	2010 VM_{211}	—	January 27, 2012	Ka-Dar	Gerke, V.	NAE	2.4 km	MPC · JPL
686443	2010 VA_{213}	—	September 11, 2004	Kitt Peak	Spacewatch	·	2.2 km	MPC · JPL
686444	2010 VR_{216}	—	January 4, 2006	Kitt Peak	Spacewatch	THM	1.9 km	MPC · JPL
686445	2010 VT_{216}	—	November 4, 2010	Mount Lemmon	Mount Lemmon Survey	·	2.7 km	MPC · JPL
686446	2010 VA_{222}	—	November 13, 2010	Mount Lemmon	Mount Lemmon Survey	·	840 m	MPC · JPL
686447	2010 VU_{225}	—	March 10, 2008	Kitt Peak	Spacewatch	V	530 m	MPC · JPL
686448	2010 VP_{226}	—	September 17, 2010	Mount Lemmon	Mount Lemmon Survey	·	2.5 km	MPC · JPL
686449	2010 VR_{226}	—	November 1, 2010	Mount Lemmon	Mount Lemmon Survey	·	1.9 km	MPC · JPL
686450	2010 VV_{226}	—	November 2, 2010	Mount Lemmon	Mount Lemmon Survey	·	2.4 km	MPC · JPL
686451	2010 VL_{231}	—	April 19, 2013	Haleakala	Pan-STARRS 1	TIR	2.3 km	MPC · JPL
686452	2010 VA_{232}	—	November 12, 2010	Mount Lemmon	Mount Lemmon Survey	VER	2.2 km	MPC · JPL
686453	2010 VD_{233}	—	June 4, 2014	Haleakala	Pan-STARRS 1	·	2.5 km	MPC · JPL
686454	2010 VF_{239}	—	November 8, 2010	Mount Lemmon	Mount Lemmon Survey	·	3.0 km	MPC · JPL
686455	2010 VS_{239}	—	November 12, 2010	Kitt Peak	Spacewatch	·	2.6 km	MPC · JPL
686456	2010 VL_{240}	—	June 27, 2014	Haleakala	Pan-STARRS 1	EOS	1.6 km	MPC · JPL
686457	2010 VF_{241}	—	June 27, 2014	Haleakala	Pan-STARRS 1	·	2.2 km	MPC · JPL
686458	2010 VR_{241}	—	December 29, 2011	Mount Lemmon	Mount Lemmon Survey	LIX	2.9 km	MPC · JPL
686459	2010 VB_{242}	—	November 10, 2010	Mount Lemmon	Mount Lemmon Survey	·	2.1 km	MPC · JPL
686460	2010 VO_{242}	—	September 19, 1998	Apache Point	SDSS Collaboration	·	2.9 km	MPC · JPL
686461	2010 VJ_{244}	—	November 10, 2010	Mount Lemmon	Mount Lemmon Survey	·	2.6 km	MPC · JPL
686462	2010 VV_{244}	—	November 3, 2016	Haleakala	Pan-STARRS 1	·	2.3 km	MPC · JPL
686463	2010 VH_{245}	—	November 27, 2014	Haleakala	Pan-STARRS 1	·	1.1 km	MPC · JPL
686464	2010 VM_{248}	—	September 11, 2015	Haleakala	Pan-STARRS 1	·	2.2 km	MPC · JPL
686465	2010 VX_{248}	—	November 2, 2010	Mount Lemmon	Mount Lemmon Survey	·	840 m	MPC · JPL
686466	2010 VN_{251}	—	November 11, 2010	Mount Lemmon	Mount Lemmon Survey	·	2.9 km	MPC · JPL
686467	2010 VV_{251}	—	November 1, 2010	Mount Lemmon	Mount Lemmon Survey	·	1.0 km	MPC · JPL
686468	2010 VH_{252}	—	November 13, 2010	Kitt Peak	Spacewatch	·	920 m	MPC · JPL
686469	2010 VY_{253}	—	November 6, 2010	Kitt Peak	Spacewatch	·	2.5 km	MPC · JPL
686470	2010 VK_{254}	—	November 10, 2010	Mount Lemmon	Mount Lemmon Survey	·	2.1 km	MPC · JPL
686471	2010 VO_{254}	—	November 8, 2010	Mount Lemmon	Mount Lemmon Survey	·	2.3 km	MPC · JPL
686472	2010 VP_{254}	—	November 13, 2010	Mount Lemmon	Mount Lemmon Survey	·	2.2 km	MPC · JPL
686473	2010 VS_{254}	—	November 1, 2010	Mount Lemmon	Mount Lemmon Survey	LIX	2.6 km	MPC · JPL
686474	2010 VV_{254}	—	November 2, 2010	Mount Lemmon	Mount Lemmon Survey	·	2.5 km	MPC · JPL
686475	2010 VX_{254}	—	November 1, 2010	Mount Lemmon	Mount Lemmon Survey	EOS	1.5 km	MPC · JPL
686476	2010 VA_{255}	—	November 2, 2010	Mount Lemmon	Mount Lemmon Survey	EOS	1.9 km	MPC · JPL
686477	2010 VG_{255}	—	November 10, 2010	Mount Lemmon	Mount Lemmon Survey	·	2.0 km	MPC · JPL
686478	2010 VF_{256}	—	November 10, 2010	Mount Lemmon	Mount Lemmon Survey	·	2.1 km	MPC · JPL
686479	2010 VP_{256}	—	November 7, 2010	Mount Lemmon	Mount Lemmon Survey	·	3.2 km	MPC · JPL
686480	2010 VR_{256}	—	November 8, 2010	Mount Lemmon	Mount Lemmon Survey	·	2.2 km	MPC · JPL
686481	2010 VX_{256}	—	November 10, 2010	Mount Lemmon	Mount Lemmon Survey	EOS	1.5 km	MPC · JPL
686482	2010 VY_{256}	—	November 10, 2010	Mount Lemmon	Mount Lemmon Survey	·	1.7 km	MPC · JPL
686483	2010 VS_{257}	—	November 13, 2010	Mount Lemmon	Mount Lemmon Survey	·	2.0 km	MPC · JPL
686484	2010 VB_{258}	—	November 8, 2010	Mount Lemmon	Mount Lemmon Survey	·	1.7 km	MPC · JPL
686485	2010 VO_{259}	—	November 6, 2010	Kitt Peak	Spacewatch	·	2.5 km	MPC · JPL
686486	2010 VV_{259}	—	November 8, 2010	Kitt Peak	Spacewatch	·	1.3 km	MPC · JPL
686487	2010 VE_{260}	—	November 8, 2010	Mount Lemmon	Mount Lemmon Survey	·	2.3 km	MPC · JPL
686488	2010 VZ_{261}	—	November 2, 2010	Mount Lemmon	Mount Lemmon Survey	·	1.9 km	MPC · JPL
686489	2010 VZ_{262}	—	November 2, 2010	Mount Lemmon	Mount Lemmon Survey	L4	7.8 km	MPC · JPL
686490	2010 VH_{263}	—	November 2, 2010	Mount Lemmon	Mount Lemmon Survey	·	2.0 km	MPC · JPL
686491	2010 VR_{264}	—	November 2, 2010	Mount Lemmon	Mount Lemmon Survey	·	2.2 km	MPC · JPL
686492	2010 VV_{264}	—	November 1, 2010	Kitt Peak	Spacewatch	·	2.2 km	MPC · JPL
686493	2010 VH_{265}	—	November 11, 2010	Mount Lemmon	Mount Lemmon Survey	·	2.5 km	MPC · JPL
686494	2010 VO_{265}	—	November 8, 2007	Kitt Peak	Spacewatch	·	540 m	MPC · JPL
686495	2010 VJ_{267}	—	November 6, 2010	Mount Lemmon	Mount Lemmon Survey	·	2.3 km	MPC · JPL
686496	2010 VR_{267}	—	November 6, 2010	Mount Lemmon	Mount Lemmon Survey	V	540 m	MPC · JPL
686497	2010 VS_{267}	—	November 3, 2010	Mount Lemmon	Mount Lemmon Survey	·	2.1 km	MPC · JPL
686498	2010 VW_{267}	—	November 13, 2010	Mount Lemmon	Mount Lemmon Survey	·	1 km	MPC · JPL
686499	2010 VA_{270}	—	October 17, 2010	Mount Lemmon	Mount Lemmon Survey	MAS	630 m	MPC · JPL
686500	2010 VC_{270}	—	November 10, 2010	Mount Lemmon	Mount Lemmon Survey	·	2.4 km	MPC · JPL

== 686501–686600 ==
back to top

Designation			Discovery			Properties		Ref
Permanent	Provisional	Named after	Date	Site	Discoverer(s)	Category	Diam.	Ref
686501	2010 VZ_{270}	—	November 6, 2010	Kitt Peak	Spacewatch	HYG	2.0 km	MPC · JPL
686502	2010 VJ_{271}	—	November 3, 2010	Kitt Peak	Spacewatch	·	2.6 km	MPC · JPL
686503	2010 VN_{272}	—	November 7, 2010	Mount Lemmon	Mount Lemmon Survey	·	2.4 km	MPC · JPL
686504	2010 VY_{272}	—	November 11, 2010	Mount Lemmon	Mount Lemmon Survey	·	2.4 km	MPC · JPL
686505	2010 VK_{273}	—	November 11, 2010	Mount Lemmon	Mount Lemmon Survey	(1298)	2.2 km	MPC · JPL
686506	2010 VP_{273}	—	November 6, 2010	Mount Lemmon	Mount Lemmon Survey	·	2.1 km	MPC · JPL
686507	2010 VB_{275}	—	November 13, 2010	Kitt Peak	Spacewatch	·	2.7 km	MPC · JPL
686508	2010 VL_{276}	—	November 6, 2010	Kitt Peak	Spacewatch	EOS	1.6 km	MPC · JPL
686509	2010 VO_{276}	—	November 11, 2010	Mount Lemmon	Mount Lemmon Survey	·	1.8 km	MPC · JPL
686510	2010 VA_{277}	—	November 2, 2010	Mount Lemmon	Mount Lemmon Survey	·	2.6 km	MPC · JPL
686511	2010 VB_{277}	—	November 3, 2010	Mount Lemmon	Mount Lemmon Survey	·	2.0 km	MPC · JPL
686512	2010 VO_{278}	—	November 8, 2010	Mount Lemmon	Mount Lemmon Survey	·	2.6 km	MPC · JPL
686513	2010 VP_{284}	—	November 15, 2010	Mount Lemmon	Mount Lemmon Survey	·	1.8 km	MPC · JPL
686514	2010 VH_{285}	—	November 14, 2010	Kitt Peak	Spacewatch	(895)	2.5 km	MPC · JPL
686515	2010 WN_{1}	—	November 14, 2010	Kitt Peak	Spacewatch	·	1.8 km	MPC · JPL
686516	2010 WN_{6}	—	November 3, 2010	Mount Lemmon	Mount Lemmon Survey	·	2.5 km	MPC · JPL
686517	2010 WV_{6}	—	November 13, 2010	Kitt Peak	Spacewatch	THM	1.9 km	MPC · JPL
686518	2010 WJ_{9}	—	November 1, 2010	Mount Lemmon	Mount Lemmon Survey	·	1.8 km	MPC · JPL
686519	2010 WD_{14}	—	November 26, 2010	Mount Lemmon	Mount Lemmon Survey	EOS	1.6 km	MPC · JPL
686520	2010 WV_{16}	—	November 27, 2010	Mount Lemmon	Mount Lemmon Survey	·	2.2 km	MPC · JPL
686521	2010 WZ_{18}	—	November 12, 2010	Kitt Peak	Spacewatch	L4	6.4 km	MPC · JPL
686522	2010 WE_{21}	—	November 13, 2010	Kitt Peak	Spacewatch	EOS	1.8 km	MPC · JPL
686523	2010 WX_{22}	—	November 13, 2010	Mount Lemmon	Mount Lemmon Survey	·	3.4 km	MPC · JPL
686524	2010 WT_{30}	—	November 13, 2010	Kitt Peak	Spacewatch	EOS	1.6 km	MPC · JPL
686525	2010 WD_{39}	—	November 27, 2010	Mount Lemmon	Mount Lemmon Survey	·	2.6 km	MPC · JPL
686526	2010 WO_{41}	—	November 27, 2010	Mount Lemmon	Mount Lemmon Survey	·	2.1 km	MPC · JPL
686527	2010 WS_{41}	—	November 14, 2010	Kitt Peak	Spacewatch	·	2.4 km	MPC · JPL
686528	2010 WQ_{44}	—	October 30, 2010	Mount Lemmon	Mount Lemmon Survey	MAR	670 m	MPC · JPL
686529	2010 WV_{45}	—	November 14, 2010	Kitt Peak	Spacewatch	·	1.4 km	MPC · JPL
686530	2010 WR_{46}	—	November 27, 2010	Mount Lemmon	Mount Lemmon Survey	(5)	770 m	MPC · JPL
686531	2010 WJ_{54}	—	October 29, 2010	Mount Lemmon	Mount Lemmon Survey	·	3.0 km	MPC · JPL
686532	2010 WL_{58}	—	November 30, 2010	Mount Lemmon	Mount Lemmon Survey	·	2.3 km	MPC · JPL
686533	2010 WC_{59}	—	October 29, 2010	Kitt Peak	Spacewatch	·	2.3 km	MPC · JPL
686534	2010 WV_{77}	—	August 27, 2014	Haleakala	Pan-STARRS 1	·	1.2 km	MPC · JPL
686535	2010 WC_{78}	—	November 25, 2010	Mount Lemmon	Mount Lemmon Survey	EOS	1.6 km	MPC · JPL
686536	2010 WG_{78}	—	November 25, 2010	Mount Lemmon	Mount Lemmon Survey	·	2.4 km	MPC · JPL
686537	2010 WU_{78}	—	November 26, 2010	Mount Lemmon	Mount Lemmon Survey	·	2.6 km	MPC · JPL
686538	2010 WX_{78}	—	November 25, 2010	Mount Lemmon	Mount Lemmon Survey	·	2.9 km	MPC · JPL
686539	2010 WB_{79}	—	November 27, 2010	Mount Lemmon	Mount Lemmon Survey	·	1 km	MPC · JPL
686540	2010 WM_{79}	—	November 27, 2010	Mount Lemmon	Mount Lemmon Survey	·	2.7 km	MPC · JPL
686541	2010 XP_{2}	—	November 27, 2006	Kitt Peak	Spacewatch	·	640 m	MPC · JPL
686542	2010 XK_{7}	—	November 12, 2010	Mount Lemmon	Mount Lemmon Survey	·	1.9 km	MPC · JPL
686543	2010 XS_{8}	—	June 15, 2009	Siding Spring	SSS	·	2.2 km	MPC · JPL
686544	2010 XN_{11}	—	December 1, 2010	Mount Lemmon	Mount Lemmon Survey	·	2.4 km	MPC · JPL
686545	2010 XS_{20}	—	December 5, 2010	Mount Lemmon	Mount Lemmon Survey	·	2.0 km	MPC · JPL
686546	2010 XT_{22}	—	October 13, 2010	Mount Lemmon	Mount Lemmon Survey	·	2.7 km	MPC · JPL
686547	2010 XC_{23}	—	November 13, 2010	Kitt Peak	Spacewatch	·	2.0 km	MPC · JPL
686548	2010 XU_{26}	—	December 1, 2010	Mount Lemmon	Mount Lemmon Survey	KOR	1.2 km	MPC · JPL
686549	2010 XM_{27}	—	February 23, 2007	Kitt Peak	Spacewatch	·	1.4 km	MPC · JPL
686550	2010 XE_{29}	—	December 1, 2010	Mount Lemmon	Mount Lemmon Survey	·	2.2 km	MPC · JPL
686551	2010 XR_{33}	—	December 2, 2010	Mount Lemmon	Mount Lemmon Survey	·	2.2 km	MPC · JPL
686552	2010 XK_{41}	—	November 13, 2006	Catalina	CSS	·	1.2 km	MPC · JPL
686553	2010 XA_{47}	—	December 6, 2010	Kitt Peak	Spacewatch	·	2.7 km	MPC · JPL
686554	2010 XM_{52}	—	December 10, 2010	Mount Lemmon	Mount Lemmon Survey	·	1.1 km	MPC · JPL
686555	2010 XM_{55}	—	December 10, 2010	Kitt Peak	Spacewatch	·	1.6 km	MPC · JPL
686556	2010 XC_{56}	—	December 8, 2010	Mayhill-ISON	L. Elenin	T_{j} (2.99)	3.4 km	MPC · JPL
686557	2010 XM_{60}	—	November 12, 2010	Mount Lemmon	Mount Lemmon Survey	·	2.4 km	MPC · JPL
686558	2010 XD_{61}	—	November 11, 2010	Kitt Peak	Spacewatch	·	2.1 km	MPC · JPL
686559	2010 XR_{62}	—	December 9, 2010	Kitt Peak	Spacewatch	·	2.6 km	MPC · JPL
686560	2010 XE_{63}	—	December 9, 2010	Kitt Peak	Spacewatch	·	2.3 km	MPC · JPL
686561	2010 XB_{65}	—	October 19, 2003	Apache Point	SDSS	·	690 m	MPC · JPL
686562	2010 XN_{67}	—	December 3, 2010	Mount Lemmon	Mount Lemmon Survey	·	2.5 km	MPC · JPL
686563	2010 XJ_{68}	—	August 17, 1999	Kitt Peak	Spacewatch	·	980 m	MPC · JPL
686564	2010 XC_{69}	—	December 5, 2010	Mount Lemmon	Mount Lemmon Survey	·	2.6 km	MPC · JPL
686565	2010 XQ_{70}	—	October 14, 2010	Mount Lemmon	Mount Lemmon Survey	·	2.1 km	MPC · JPL
686566	2010 XX_{81}	—	December 2, 2010	Mount Lemmon	Mount Lemmon Survey	·	2.3 km	MPC · JPL
686567	2010 XA_{82}	—	December 2, 2010	Mount Lemmon	Mount Lemmon Survey	·	2.0 km	MPC · JPL
686568	2010 XS_{92}	—	December 6, 2010	Mount Lemmon	Mount Lemmon Survey	·	2.1 km	MPC · JPL
686569	2010 XS_{95}	—	March 22, 2012	Mount Lemmon	Mount Lemmon Survey	NAE	1.7 km	MPC · JPL
686570	2010 XA_{96}	—	November 19, 2014	Haleakala	Pan-STARRS 1	EUN	800 m	MPC · JPL
686571	2010 XQ_{96}	—	July 2, 2013	Haleakala	Pan-STARRS 1	PHO	810 m	MPC · JPL
686572	2010 XH_{97}	—	June 24, 2014	Haleakala	Pan-STARRS 1	·	2.4 km	MPC · JPL
686573	2010 XS_{97}	—	December 31, 2011	Kitt Peak	Spacewatch	·	2.2 km	MPC · JPL
686574	2010 XK_{99}	—	December 14, 2010	Mount Lemmon	Mount Lemmon Survey	T_{j} (2.94)	3.0 km	MPC · JPL
686575	2010 XD_{100}	—	December 2, 2010	Mount Lemmon	Mount Lemmon Survey	·	1.5 km	MPC · JPL
686576	2010 XC_{101}	—	December 1, 2010	Mount Lemmon	Mount Lemmon Survey	·	3.2 km	MPC · JPL
686577	2010 XH_{102}	—	July 25, 2017	Haleakala	Pan-STARRS 1	·	1.0 km	MPC · JPL
686578	2010 XB_{103}	—	October 10, 2015	Haleakala	Pan-STARRS 1	·	2.3 km	MPC · JPL
686579	2010 XC_{103}	—	June 27, 2014	Haleakala	Pan-STARRS 1	·	1.8 km	MPC · JPL
686580	2010 XF_{104}	—	September 17, 2014	Haleakala	Pan-STARRS 1	PAD	1.1 km	MPC · JPL
686581	2010 XJ_{104}	—	October 15, 2015	Haleakala	Pan-STARRS 1	·	2.2 km	MPC · JPL
686582	2010 XR_{105}	—	July 26, 2014	Haleakala	Pan-STARRS 1	·	2.3 km	MPC · JPL
686583	2010 XW_{105}	—	July 19, 2015	Haleakala	Pan-STARRS 1	·	3.2 km	MPC · JPL
686584	2010 XF_{106}	—	September 23, 2015	Haleakala	Pan-STARRS 1	VER	2.0 km	MPC · JPL
686585	2010 XG_{106}	—	September 23, 2015	Haleakala	Pan-STARRS 1	·	2.4 km	MPC · JPL
686586	2010 XL_{107}	—	December 2, 2010	Mount Lemmon	Mount Lemmon Survey	·	2.2 km	MPC · JPL
686587	2010 XX_{108}	—	December 3, 2010	Mount Lemmon	Mount Lemmon Survey	·	2.2 km	MPC · JPL
686588	2010 XJ_{109}	—	September 12, 2001	Kitt Peak	Spacewatch	(5)	960 m	MPC · JPL
686589	2010 XY_{111}	—	December 13, 2010	Mount Lemmon	Mount Lemmon Survey	L4	6.6 km	MPC · JPL
686590	2010 XL_{112}	—	December 10, 2010	Mount Lemmon	Mount Lemmon Survey	·	2.2 km	MPC · JPL
686591	2010 XO_{113}	—	December 3, 2010	Mount Lemmon	Mount Lemmon Survey	·	1.7 km	MPC · JPL
686592	2010 XB_{114}	—	December 2, 2010	Mount Lemmon	Mount Lemmon Survey	·	1.6 km	MPC · JPL
686593	2010 XO_{115}	—	December 14, 2010	Mount Lemmon	Mount Lemmon Survey	L4	6.2 km	MPC · JPL
686594	2010 XX_{115}	—	December 14, 2010	Mount Lemmon	Mount Lemmon Survey	·	2.4 km	MPC · JPL
686595	2010 XF_{116}	—	January 10, 2007	Mount Lemmon	Mount Lemmon Survey	·	790 m	MPC · JPL
686596	2010 XG_{116}	—	December 2, 2010	Mount Lemmon	Mount Lemmon Survey	EOS	1.6 km	MPC · JPL
686597	2010 XF_{117}	—	December 4, 2010	Mount Lemmon	Mount Lemmon Survey	·	2.2 km	MPC · JPL
686598	2010 XM_{118}	—	December 14, 2010	Mount Lemmon	Mount Lemmon Survey	·	2.5 km	MPC · JPL
686599	2010 XC_{119}	—	December 13, 2010	Mount Lemmon	Mount Lemmon Survey	·	810 m	MPC · JPL
686600	2010 XJ_{119}	—	December 3, 2010	Mount Lemmon	Mount Lemmon Survey	·	2.3 km	MPC · JPL

== 686601–686700 ==
back to top

Designation			Discovery			Properties		Ref
Permanent	Provisional	Named after	Date	Site	Discoverer(s)	Category	Diam.	Ref
686601	2010 XL_{119}	—	December 4, 2010	Mount Lemmon	Mount Lemmon Survey	·	2.4 km	MPC · JPL
686602	2010 XM_{119}	—	December 13, 2010	Mount Lemmon	Mount Lemmon Survey	·	2.4 km	MPC · JPL
686603	2010 XY_{119}	—	December 6, 2010	Mount Lemmon	Mount Lemmon Survey	·	2.3 km	MPC · JPL
686604	2010 XK_{120}	—	December 14, 2010	Mount Lemmon	Mount Lemmon Survey	·	2.8 km	MPC · JPL
686605	2010 XO_{120}	—	December 2, 2010	Mount Lemmon	Mount Lemmon Survey	·	2.1 km	MPC · JPL
686606	2010 XV_{120}	—	December 4, 2010	Mount Lemmon	Mount Lemmon Survey	·	1.1 km	MPC · JPL
686607	2010 XQ_{122}	—	December 14, 2010	Mount Lemmon	Mount Lemmon Survey	·	1.1 km	MPC · JPL
686608	2010 XR_{122}	—	December 6, 2010	Mount Lemmon	Mount Lemmon Survey	·	690 m	MPC · JPL
686609	2010 XV_{122}	—	December 14, 2010	Mount Lemmon	Mount Lemmon Survey	MAR	730 m	MPC · JPL
686610	2010 XZ_{122}	—	December 9, 2010	Kitt Peak	Spacewatch	·	2.7 km	MPC · JPL
686611	2010 XC_{123}	—	December 14, 2010	Mount Lemmon	Mount Lemmon Survey	·	2.1 km	MPC · JPL
686612	2010 YU_{6}	—	October 11, 2015	Mount Lemmon	Mount Lemmon Survey	·	2.7 km	MPC · JPL
686613	2010 YA_{7}	—	December 25, 2010	Mount Lemmon	Mount Lemmon Survey	MAR	760 m	MPC · JPL
686614	2011 AZ_{1}	—	August 8, 2005	Cerro Tololo	Deep Ecliptic Survey	(5)	850 m	MPC · JPL
686615	2011 AN_{2}	—	January 2, 2011	Mount Lemmon	Mount Lemmon Survey	·	2.3 km	MPC · JPL
686616	2011 AC_{11}	—	January 3, 2011	Mount Lemmon	Mount Lemmon Survey	·	2.5 km	MPC · JPL
686617	2011 AY_{14}	—	December 8, 2010	Mount Lemmon	Mount Lemmon Survey	·	930 m	MPC · JPL
686618	2011 AZ_{17}	—	November 8, 2010	Mount Lemmon	Mount Lemmon Survey	EOS	1.9 km	MPC · JPL
686619	2011 AQ_{18}	—	January 8, 2011	Mount Lemmon	Mount Lemmon Survey	·	2.4 km	MPC · JPL
686620	2011 AW_{22}	—	March 9, 2007	Kitt Peak	Spacewatch	·	890 m	MPC · JPL
686621	2011 AD_{31}	—	January 9, 2011	Kitt Peak	Spacewatch	T_{j} (2.96)	3.2 km	MPC · JPL
686622	2011 AP_{34}	—	December 10, 2010	Mount Lemmon	Mount Lemmon Survey	·	830 m	MPC · JPL
686623	2011 AY_{34}	—	December 10, 2010	Mount Lemmon	Mount Lemmon Survey	·	2.9 km	MPC · JPL
686624	2011 AG_{37}	—	December 8, 2010	Mount Lemmon	Mount Lemmon Survey	·	530 m	MPC · JPL
686625	2011 AX_{39}	—	January 10, 2011	Mount Lemmon	Mount Lemmon Survey	(5)	930 m	MPC · JPL
686626	2011 AQ_{40}	—	January 10, 2011	Mount Lemmon	Mount Lemmon Survey	·	860 m	MPC · JPL
686627	2011 AJ_{42}	—	September 19, 1998	Apache Point	SDSS Collaboration	·	2.1 km	MPC · JPL
686628	2011 AV_{44}	—	October 14, 2001	Apache Point	SDSS Collaboration	(5)	930 m	MPC · JPL
686629	2011 AN_{48}	—	December 5, 2010	Mount Lemmon	Mount Lemmon Survey	·	2.4 km	MPC · JPL
686630	2011 AW_{48}	—	October 16, 2003	Kitt Peak	Spacewatch	·	3.0 km	MPC · JPL
686631	2011 AX_{49}	—	January 13, 2011	Mount Lemmon	Mount Lemmon Survey	·	860 m	MPC · JPL
686632	2011 AK_{51}	—	December 10, 2010	Mount Lemmon	Mount Lemmon Survey	·	790 m	MPC · JPL
686633	2011 AB_{57}	—	January 10, 2011	Mount Lemmon	Mount Lemmon Survey	EUP	3.1 km	MPC · JPL
686634	2011 AX_{58}	—	November 15, 2010	Mount Lemmon	Mount Lemmon Survey	·	2.0 km	MPC · JPL
686635	2011 AS_{59}	—	January 12, 2011	Mount Lemmon	Mount Lemmon Survey	VER	2.1 km	MPC · JPL
686636	2011 AD_{62}	—	February 6, 2003	Kitt Peak	Spacewatch	·	1.1 km	MPC · JPL
686637	2011 AH_{63}	—	January 13, 2011	Kitt Peak	Spacewatch	·	1.1 km	MPC · JPL
686638	2011 AY_{64}	—	January 3, 2011	Mount Lemmon	Mount Lemmon Survey	·	2.8 km	MPC · JPL
686639	2011 AT_{68}	—	February 4, 2006	Kitt Peak	Spacewatch	·	1.8 km	MPC · JPL
686640	2011 AS_{69}	—	January 13, 2011	Mount Lemmon	Mount Lemmon Survey	·	790 m	MPC · JPL
686641	2011 AH_{71}	—	December 1, 2005	Kitt Peak	Wasserman, L. H., Millis, R. L.	·	850 m	MPC · JPL
686642	2011 AG_{78}	—	January 3, 2011	Mount Lemmon	Mount Lemmon Survey	·	2.4 km	MPC · JPL
686643	2011 AN_{78}	—	January 12, 2011	Kitt Peak	Spacewatch	·	940 m	MPC · JPL
686644	2011 AO_{81}	—	January 2, 2011	Mount Lemmon	Mount Lemmon Survey	EUP	2.9 km	MPC · JPL
686645	2011 AR_{81}	—	January 3, 2011	Piszkéstető	Kuli, Z., K. Sárneczky	·	2.4 km	MPC · JPL
686646	2011 AT_{81}	—	January 30, 2006	Kitt Peak	Spacewatch	EOS	1.8 km	MPC · JPL
686647	2011 AL_{84}	—	August 14, 2013	Haleakala	Pan-STARRS 1	·	1.0 km	MPC · JPL
686648	2011 AY_{84}	—	August 25, 2014	Haleakala	Pan-STARRS 1	·	2.6 km	MPC · JPL
686649	2011 AE_{85}	—	September 15, 2013	Mount Lemmon	Mount Lemmon Survey	·	1.3 km	MPC · JPL
686650	2011 AA_{86}	—	November 18, 2015	Haleakala	Pan-STARRS 1	·	2.8 km	MPC · JPL
686651	2011 AF_{86}	—	June 24, 2014	Haleakala	Pan-STARRS 1	·	3.0 km	MPC · JPL
686652	2011 AB_{87}	—	September 23, 2015	Haleakala	Pan-STARRS 1	·	2.4 km	MPC · JPL
686653	2011 AT_{90}	—	June 24, 2014	Haleakala	Pan-STARRS 1	T_{j} (2.93)	3.1 km	MPC · JPL
686654	2011 AJ_{91}	—	January 8, 2011	Mount Lemmon	Mount Lemmon Survey	BRG	1.0 km	MPC · JPL
686655	2011 AV_{92}	—	January 11, 2011	Mount Lemmon	Mount Lemmon Survey	·	830 m	MPC · JPL
686656	2011 AV_{94}	—	January 13, 2011	Mount Lemmon	Mount Lemmon Survey	L4	8.0 km	MPC · JPL
686657	2011 AP_{96}	—	January 12, 2011	Mount Lemmon	Mount Lemmon Survey	·	940 m	MPC · JPL
686658	2011 AY_{96}	—	January 13, 2011	Mount Lemmon	Mount Lemmon Survey	·	830 m	MPC · JPL
686659	2011 AF_{98}	—	January 3, 2011	Mount Lemmon	Mount Lemmon Survey	·	1.3 km	MPC · JPL
686660	2011 AL_{98}	—	January 2, 2011	Mount Lemmon	Mount Lemmon Survey	·	2.0 km	MPC · JPL
686661	2011 AW_{98}	—	January 13, 2011	Mount Lemmon	Mount Lemmon Survey	·	840 m	MPC · JPL
686662	2011 AY_{98}	—	January 14, 2011	Mount Lemmon	Mount Lemmon Survey	·	2.6 km	MPC · JPL
686663	2011 AG_{99}	—	January 8, 2011	Mount Lemmon	Mount Lemmon Survey	·	2.6 km	MPC · JPL
686664	2011 AZ_{99}	—	January 11, 2011	Kitt Peak	Spacewatch	·	990 m	MPC · JPL
686665	2011 AH_{104}	—	January 8, 2011	Mount Lemmon	Mount Lemmon Survey	·	2.9 km	MPC · JPL
686666	2011 AJ_{104}	—	January 2, 2011	Mount Lemmon	Mount Lemmon Survey	·	910 m	MPC · JPL
686667	2011 AQ_{105}	—	October 27, 2009	Mount Lemmon	Mount Lemmon Survey	·	2.2 km	MPC · JPL
686668	2011 BV_{9}	—	December 1, 2005	Kitt Peak	Wasserman, L. H., Millis, R. L.	·	1.5 km	MPC · JPL
686669	2011 BR_{11}	—	January 24, 2011	Alder Springs	Levin, K.	·	2.0 km	MPC · JPL
686670	2011 BB_{18}	—	October 29, 2005	Kitt Peak	Spacewatch	·	930 m	MPC · JPL
686671	2011 BV_{21}	—	February 23, 2007	Mount Lemmon	Mount Lemmon Survey	·	920 m	MPC · JPL
686672	2011 BW_{25}	—	January 23, 2011	Mount Lemmon	Mount Lemmon Survey	·	1.4 km	MPC · JPL
686673	2011 BU_{26}	—	December 5, 2010	Mount Lemmon	Mount Lemmon Survey	·	2.6 km	MPC · JPL
686674	2011 BY_{30}	—	January 26, 2011	Mount Lemmon	Mount Lemmon Survey	·	1.1 km	MPC · JPL
686675	2011 BY_{32}	—	January 27, 2011	Mount Lemmon	Mount Lemmon Survey	EOS	1.7 km	MPC · JPL
686676	2011 BE_{34}	—	January 27, 2011	Kitt Peak	Spacewatch	VER	2.2 km	MPC · JPL
686677	2011 BZ_{34}	—	March 16, 2007	Mount Lemmon	Mount Lemmon Survey	·	930 m	MPC · JPL
686678	2011 BR_{35}	—	March 10, 2007	Mount Lemmon	Mount Lemmon Survey	·	760 m	MPC · JPL
686679	2011 BT_{35}	—	January 28, 2011	Mount Lemmon	Mount Lemmon Survey	·	2.6 km	MPC · JPL
686680	2011 BG_{36}	—	July 29, 2008	Mount Lemmon	Mount Lemmon Survey	·	2.8 km	MPC · JPL
686681	2011 BO_{38}	—	January 25, 2007	Kitt Peak	Spacewatch	·	1.3 km	MPC · JPL
686682	2011 BX_{40}	—	January 29, 2011	Bergisch Gladbach	W. Bickel	·	3.0 km	MPC · JPL
686683	2011 BQ_{41}	—	January 30, 2011	Piszkés-tető	K. Sárneczky, Z. Kuli	·	2.5 km	MPC · JPL
686684	2011 BS_{41}	—	January 30, 2011	Piszkés-tető	K. Sárneczky, Z. Kuli	·	1.2 km	MPC · JPL
686685	2011 BU_{41}	—	January 30, 2011	Piszkés-tető	K. Sárneczky, Z. Kuli	·	2.4 km	MPC · JPL
686686	2011 BV_{41}	—	February 24, 2006	Mount Lemmon	Mount Lemmon Survey	·	2.6 km	MPC · JPL
686687	2011 BD_{42}	—	January 30, 2011	Piszkés-tető	K. Sárneczky, S. Kürti	·	2.4 km	MPC · JPL
686688	2011 BW_{42}	—	January 30, 2011	Piszkés-tető	K. Sárneczky, Z. Kuli	·	2.7 km	MPC · JPL
686689	2011 BH_{43}	—	January 30, 2011	Piszkés-tető	K. Sárneczky, Z. Kuli	·	1.1 km	MPC · JPL
686690	2011 BB_{46}	—	January 31, 2011	Piszkéstető	Kuli, Z., K. Sárneczky	·	2.3 km	MPC · JPL
686691	2011 BB_{47}	—	January 31, 2011	Piszkéstető	K. Sárneczky, Z. Kuli	T_{j} (2.97)	3.0 km	MPC · JPL
686692	2011 BG_{47}	—	January 31, 2011	Piszkés-tető	K. Sárneczky, Z. Kuli	·	640 m	MPC · JPL
686693	2011 BJ_{47}	—	January 31, 2011	Piszkés-tető	K. Sárneczky, Z. Kuli	·	2.7 km	MPC · JPL
686694	2011 BQ_{48}	—	December 27, 2006	Mount Lemmon	Mount Lemmon Survey	·	1.2 km	MPC · JPL
686695	2011 BY_{49}	—	January 31, 2011	Piszkés-tető	K. Sárneczky, Z. Kuli	·	2.9 km	MPC · JPL
686696	2011 BK_{55}	—	September 29, 2009	Mount Lemmon	Mount Lemmon Survey	·	1.3 km	MPC · JPL
686697	2011 BX_{64}	—	January 29, 2011	Mount Lemmon	Mount Lemmon Survey	·	2.4 km	MPC · JPL
686698	2011 BZ_{64}	—	October 15, 2009	Mount Lemmon	Mount Lemmon Survey	·	1.2 km	MPC · JPL
686699	2011 BO_{65}	—	February 1, 2011	Piszkés-tető	K. Sárneczky, Z. Kuli	EUN	720 m	MPC · JPL
686700	2011 BX_{68}	—	January 17, 2004	Palomar	NEAT	·	670 m	MPC · JPL

== 686701–686800 ==
back to top

Designation			Discovery			Properties		Ref
Permanent	Provisional	Named after	Date	Site	Discoverer(s)	Category	Diam.	Ref
686701	2011 BB_{70}	—	January 29, 2011	Mount Lemmon	Mount Lemmon Survey	·	1.2 km	MPC · JPL
686702	2011 BY_{72}	—	April 18, 2007	Mount Lemmon	Mount Lemmon Survey	·	1.0 km	MPC · JPL
686703	2011 BV_{77}	—	October 7, 2010	Catalina	CSS	·	2.2 km	MPC · JPL
686704	2011 BL_{83}	—	September 27, 2003	Kitt Peak	Spacewatch	·	2.6 km	MPC · JPL
686705	2011 BQ_{87}	—	January 27, 2011	Mount Lemmon	Mount Lemmon Survey	THM	1.9 km	MPC · JPL
686706	2011 BL_{88}	—	December 1, 2005	Kitt Peak	Wasserman, L. H., Millis, R. L.	·	1.9 km	MPC · JPL
686707	2011 BA_{89}	—	February 26, 2004	Kitt Peak	Deep Ecliptic Survey	MAS	680 m	MPC · JPL
686708	2011 BB_{90}	—	January 13, 2011	Kitt Peak	Spacewatch	·	970 m	MPC · JPL
686709	2011 BV_{90}	—	January 23, 2006	Mount Lemmon	Mount Lemmon Survey	·	1.5 km	MPC · JPL
686710	2011 BT_{93}	—	January 28, 2011	Mount Lemmon	Mount Lemmon Survey	KON	1.9 km	MPC · JPL
686711	2011 BZ_{93}	—	January 29, 2011	Kitt Peak	Spacewatch	·	3.0 km	MPC · JPL
686712	2011 BJ_{99}	—	October 1, 2008	Mount Lemmon	Mount Lemmon Survey	EOS	2.1 km	MPC · JPL
686713	2011 BV_{100}	—	March 6, 2011	Mount Lemmon	Mount Lemmon Survey	·	1.5 km	MPC · JPL
686714	2011 BX_{100}	—	February 7, 2011	Kitt Peak	Spacewatch	·	3.5 km	MPC · JPL
686715	2011 BG_{104}	—	August 25, 2004	Kitt Peak	Spacewatch	·	1.6 km	MPC · JPL
686716	2011 BQ_{104}	—	September 30, 2005	Mauna Kea	A. Boattini	·	1.5 km	MPC · JPL
686717	2011 BQ_{105}	—	September 9, 2008	Mount Lemmon	Mount Lemmon Survey	·	2.7 km	MPC · JPL
686718	2011 BU_{107}	—	October 14, 2009	Mount Lemmon	Mount Lemmon Survey	·	1.3 km	MPC · JPL
686719	2011 BW_{110}	—	July 30, 2014	Haleakala	Pan-STARRS 1	·	2.3 km	MPC · JPL
686720	2011 BV_{116}	—	January 25, 2011	Mount Lemmon	Mount Lemmon Survey	·	1.0 km	MPC · JPL
686721	2011 BB_{117}	—	April 25, 2007	Kitt Peak	Spacewatch	EOS	1.7 km	MPC · JPL
686722	2011 BU_{121}	—	February 9, 2011	Mount Lemmon	Mount Lemmon Survey	H	420 m	MPC · JPL
686723	2011 BY_{125}	—	January 27, 2011	Mount Lemmon	Mount Lemmon Survey	·	920 m	MPC · JPL
686724	2011 BG_{129}	—	September 19, 2009	Mount Lemmon	Mount Lemmon Survey	·	780 m	MPC · JPL
686725	2011 BA_{130}	—	January 28, 2011	Mount Lemmon	Mount Lemmon Survey	·	2.4 km	MPC · JPL
686726	2011 BR_{133}	—	January 29, 2011	Mount Lemmon	Mount Lemmon Survey	·	780 m	MPC · JPL
686727	2011 BZ_{140}	—	January 29, 2011	Mount Lemmon	Mount Lemmon Survey	·	2.3 km	MPC · JPL
686728	2011 BR_{141}	—	January 29, 2011	Mount Lemmon	Mount Lemmon Survey	·	2.2 km	MPC · JPL
686729	2011 BR_{146}	—	January 29, 2011	Mount Lemmon	Mount Lemmon Survey	·	1.5 km	MPC · JPL
686730	2011 BY_{146}	—	October 21, 2006	Mount Lemmon	Mount Lemmon Survey	MAS	560 m	MPC · JPL
686731	2011 BT_{147}	—	January 29, 2011	Mount Lemmon	Mount Lemmon Survey	·	2.7 km	MPC · JPL
686732	2011 BX_{149}	—	January 29, 2011	Mount Lemmon	Mount Lemmon Survey	·	2.4 km	MPC · JPL
686733	2011 BT_{153}	—	September 26, 2003	Apache Point	SDSS Collaboration	·	2.6 km	MPC · JPL
686734	2011 BU_{153}	—	February 2, 2011	Kitt Peak	Spacewatch	·	730 m	MPC · JPL
686735	2011 BB_{154}	—	September 26, 2003	Apache Point	SDSS Collaboration	EOS	1.7 km	MPC · JPL
686736	2011 BP_{155}	—	January 28, 2011	Mount Lemmon	Mount Lemmon Survey	·	810 m	MPC · JPL
686737	2011 BB_{157}	—	January 28, 2011	Mount Lemmon	Mount Lemmon Survey	·	2.6 km	MPC · JPL
686738	2011 BP_{157}	—	January 29, 2011	Mount Lemmon	Mount Lemmon Survey	·	840 m	MPC · JPL
686739	2011 BS_{158}	—	July 30, 2008	Mount Lemmon	Mount Lemmon Survey	·	1.1 km	MPC · JPL
686740	2011 BU_{165}	—	February 25, 2011	Mount Lemmon	Mount Lemmon Survey	EOS	1.6 km	MPC · JPL
686741	2011 BV_{165}	—	April 10, 2003	Kitt Peak	Spacewatch	·	1.3 km	MPC · JPL
686742	2011 BF_{166}	—	March 15, 2004	Kitt Peak	Spacewatch	V	610 m	MPC · JPL
686743	2011 BX_{167}	—	February 12, 2011	Mount Lemmon	Mount Lemmon Survey	·	1.1 km	MPC · JPL
686744	2011 BM_{169}	—	February 9, 2011	Mount Lemmon	Mount Lemmon Survey	(5)	840 m	MPC · JPL
686745	2011 BN_{169}	—	February 10, 2011	Mount Lemmon	Mount Lemmon Survey	·	1.4 km	MPC · JPL
686746	2011 BC_{171}	—	February 12, 2011	Mount Lemmon	Mount Lemmon Survey	·	2.3 km	MPC · JPL
686747	2011 BF_{171}	—	January 23, 2011	Mount Lemmon	Mount Lemmon Survey	·	2.4 km	MPC · JPL
686748	2011 BX_{171}	—	January 30, 2011	Mount Lemmon	Mount Lemmon Survey	·	1.7 km	MPC · JPL
686749	2011 BK_{172}	—	July 16, 2013	Haleakala	Pan-STARRS 1	·	3.1 km	MPC · JPL
686750	2011 BQ_{172}	—	September 2, 2014	Haleakala	Pan-STARRS 1	·	2.7 km	MPC · JPL
686751	2011 BL_{173}	—	July 25, 2014	Haleakala	Pan-STARRS 1	·	2.1 km	MPC · JPL
686752	2011 BT_{173}	—	July 29, 2014	Haleakala	Pan-STARRS 1	·	2.9 km	MPC · JPL
686753	2011 BL_{174}	—	March 8, 2011	Mount Lemmon	Mount Lemmon Survey	·	1.0 km	MPC · JPL
686754	2011 BU_{174}	—	October 28, 2014	Haleakala	Pan-STARRS 1	·	1.4 km	MPC · JPL
686755	2011 BC_{175}	—	February 5, 2011	Haleakala	Pan-STARRS 1	EUN	850 m	MPC · JPL
686756	2011 BQ_{181}	—	January 16, 2011	Mount Lemmon	Mount Lemmon Survey	·	780 m	MPC · JPL
686757	2011 BD_{183}	—	January 27, 2011	Mount Lemmon	Mount Lemmon Survey	VER	2.1 km	MPC · JPL
686758	2011 BC_{185}	—	February 5, 2011	Haleakala	Pan-STARRS 1	EUN	840 m	MPC · JPL
686759	2011 BD_{185}	—	January 28, 2011	Mount Lemmon	Mount Lemmon Survey	MAR	900 m	MPC · JPL
686760	2011 BM_{187}	—	February 11, 2011	Mount Lemmon	Mount Lemmon Survey	·	2.4 km	MPC · JPL
686761	2011 BW_{187}	—	February 13, 2011	Mount Lemmon	Mount Lemmon Survey	·	3.2 km	MPC · JPL
686762	2011 BX_{187}	—	August 28, 2014	Haleakala	Pan-STARRS 1	·	2.6 km	MPC · JPL
686763	2011 BA_{188}	—	August 29, 2014	Mount Lemmon	Mount Lemmon Survey	·	2.6 km	MPC · JPL
686764	2011 BB_{189}	—	October 1, 2014	Haleakala	Pan-STARRS 1	·	2.2 km	MPC · JPL
686765	2011 BR_{189}	—	February 11, 2011	Mount Lemmon	Mount Lemmon Survey	·	840 m	MPC · JPL
686766	2011 BD_{191}	—	February 7, 2011	Mount Lemmon	Mount Lemmon Survey	·	1.6 km	MPC · JPL
686767	2011 BA_{194}	—	January 30, 2011	Kitt Peak	Spacewatch	MIS	1.9 km	MPC · JPL
686768	2011 BE_{194}	—	January 28, 2011	Mount Lemmon	Mount Lemmon Survey	·	2.4 km	MPC · JPL
686769	2011 BW_{194}	—	January 30, 2011	Haleakala	Pan-STARRS 1	EUN	860 m	MPC · JPL
686770	2011 BU_{195}	—	January 29, 2011	Mount Lemmon	Mount Lemmon Survey	·	780 m	MPC · JPL
686771	2011 BY_{195}	—	January 28, 2011	Mount Lemmon	Mount Lemmon Survey	·	1.1 km	MPC · JPL
686772	2011 BT_{196}	—	January 27, 2011	Mount Lemmon	Mount Lemmon Survey	·	700 m	MPC · JPL
686773	2011 BY_{197}	—	January 23, 2011	Mount Lemmon	Mount Lemmon Survey	·	2.8 km	MPC · JPL
686774	2011 BD_{201}	—	January 29, 2011	Mount Lemmon	Mount Lemmon Survey	·	2.2 km	MPC · JPL
686775	2011 BA_{204}	—	January 30, 2011	Mount Lemmon	Mount Lemmon Survey	·	1.1 km	MPC · JPL
686776	2011 BV_{208}	—	January 29, 2011	Kitt Peak	Spacewatch	·	1.1 km	MPC · JPL
686777	2011 CU	—	February 2, 2011	Piszkés-tető	K. Sárneczky, Z. Kuli	·	3.0 km	MPC · JPL
686778	2011 CJ_{19}	—	December 3, 2010	Mount Lemmon	Mount Lemmon Survey	JUN	710 m	MPC · JPL
686779	2011 CH_{24}	—	February 1, 2011	Piszkés-tető	K. Sárneczky, Z. Kuli	EOS	1.5 km	MPC · JPL
686780	2011 CQ_{30}	—	September 20, 2003	Kitt Peak	Spacewatch	EOS	2.0 km	MPC · JPL
686781	2011 CK_{31}	—	January 28, 2006	Mount Lemmon	Mount Lemmon Survey	·	1.5 km	MPC · JPL
686782	2011 CA_{38}	—	February 5, 2011	Mount Lemmon	Mount Lemmon Survey	·	2.7 km	MPC · JPL
686783	2011 CL_{44}	—	January 30, 2011	Mount Lemmon	Mount Lemmon Survey	·	900 m	MPC · JPL
686784	2011 CW_{45}	—	February 8, 2011	Mount Lemmon	Mount Lemmon Survey	·	2.5 km	MPC · JPL
686785	2011 CL_{48}	—	October 10, 2004	Kitt Peak	Spacewatch	·	2.0 km	MPC · JPL
686786	2011 CN_{49}	—	February 8, 2011	Mount Lemmon	Mount Lemmon Survey	·	1.1 km	MPC · JPL
686787	2011 CA_{55}	—	August 28, 2000	Cerro Tololo	Deep Ecliptic Survey	·	1.1 km	MPC · JPL
686788	2011 CA_{58}	—	February 8, 2011	Mount Lemmon	Mount Lemmon Survey	·	850 m	MPC · JPL
686789	2011 CB_{60}	—	October 1, 2003	Kitt Peak	Spacewatch	·	2.4 km	MPC · JPL
686790	2011 CS_{61}	—	February 8, 2011	Mount Lemmon	Mount Lemmon Survey	PHO	780 m	MPC · JPL
686791	2011 CZ_{62}	—	February 26, 2007	Mount Lemmon	Mount Lemmon Survey	·	950 m	MPC · JPL
686792	2011 CL_{64}	—	September 29, 2009	Mount Lemmon	Mount Lemmon Survey	·	1.5 km	MPC · JPL
686793	2011 CM_{74}	—	March 11, 2007	Kitt Peak	Spacewatch	(5)	960 m	MPC · JPL
686794	2011 CG_{77}	—	February 3, 2011	Piszkés-tető	K. Sárneczky, Z. Kuli	BRG	1.3 km	MPC · JPL
686795	2011 CC_{85}	—	September 7, 2008	Mount Lemmon	Mount Lemmon Survey	·	1.1 km	MPC · JPL
686796	2011 CG_{85}	—	February 12, 2011	Mount Lemmon	Mount Lemmon Survey	·	2.2 km	MPC · JPL
686797	2011 CJ_{91}	—	November 17, 2001	Kitt Peak	Spacewatch	·	800 m	MPC · JPL
686798	2011 CQ_{96}	—	February 5, 2011	Haleakala	Pan-STARRS 1	·	1.3 km	MPC · JPL
686799	2011 CS_{98}	—	February 5, 2011	Haleakala	Pan-STARRS 1	·	2.8 km	MPC · JPL
686800	2011 CX_{98}	—	June 2, 2008	Mount Lemmon	Mount Lemmon Survey	·	2.7 km	MPC · JPL

== 686801–686900 ==
back to top

Designation			Discovery			Properties		Ref
Permanent	Provisional	Named after	Date	Site	Discoverer(s)	Category	Diam.	Ref
686801	2011 CX_{101}	—	November 25, 2009	Kitt Peak	Spacewatch	·	2.3 km	MPC · JPL
686802	2011 CJ_{103}	—	February 10, 2011	Mount Lemmon	Mount Lemmon Survey	·	1.4 km	MPC · JPL
686803	2011 CY_{109}	—	March 6, 2011	Mount Lemmon	Mount Lemmon Survey	·	790 m	MPC · JPL
686804	2011 CD_{110}	—	September 6, 2008	Mount Lemmon	Mount Lemmon Survey	·	2.3 km	MPC · JPL
686805	2011 CK_{111}	—	September 28, 2003	Kitt Peak	Spacewatch	EOS	1.6 km	MPC · JPL
686806	2011 CC_{114}	—	October 10, 2008	Mount Lemmon	Mount Lemmon Survey	·	2.0 km	MPC · JPL
686807	2011 CP_{119}	—	April 22, 2007	Kitt Peak	Spacewatch	·	1.7 km	MPC · JPL
686808	2011 CS_{121}	—	February 11, 2000	Kitt Peak	Spacewatch	·	2.7 km	MPC · JPL
686809	2011 CL_{125}	—	February 12, 2011	Mount Lemmon	Mount Lemmon Survey	·	940 m	MPC · JPL
686810	2011 CT_{125}	—	February 10, 2011	Mount Lemmon	Mount Lemmon Survey	·	2.1 km	MPC · JPL
686811	2011 CB_{127}	—	April 22, 2012	Kitt Peak	Spacewatch	·	2.7 km	MPC · JPL
686812	2011 CL_{132}	—	February 5, 2011	Haleakala	Pan-STARRS 1	·	820 m	MPC · JPL
686813	2011 CU_{132}	—	February 12, 2011	Mount Lemmon	Mount Lemmon Survey	·	1.6 km	MPC · JPL
686814	2011 CT_{134}	—	February 5, 2011	Mount Lemmon	Mount Lemmon Survey	·	850 m	MPC · JPL
686815	2011 CH_{137}	—	February 10, 2011	Mount Lemmon	Mount Lemmon Survey	·	610 m	MPC · JPL
686816	2011 CW_{141}	—	December 8, 2015	Haleakala	Pan-STARRS 1	·	1.6 km	MPC · JPL
686817	2011 CM_{142}	—	February 5, 2011	Mount Lemmon	Mount Lemmon Survey	·	910 m	MPC · JPL
686818	2011 CC_{149}	—	February 8, 2011	Mount Lemmon	Mount Lemmon Survey	(5)	830 m	MPC · JPL
686819	2011 CL_{149}	—	February 10, 2011	Mount Lemmon	Mount Lemmon Survey	·	1.0 km	MPC · JPL
686820	2011 CQ_{152}	—	October 14, 2009	Mount Lemmon	Mount Lemmon Survey	·	940 m	MPC · JPL
686821	2011 CB_{154}	—	February 21, 2007	Kitt Peak	Spacewatch	·	1.0 km	MPC · JPL
686822	2011 CK_{154}	—	July 8, 2016	Haleakala	Pan-STARRS 1	·	1.1 km	MPC · JPL
686823	2011 CN_{154}	—	February 9, 2011	Mount Lemmon	Mount Lemmon Survey	·	720 m	MPC · JPL
686824	2011 DJ_{2}	—	February 23, 2011	Kitt Peak	Spacewatch	·	1.9 km	MPC · JPL
686825	2011 DG_{9}	—	September 2, 2000	Kitt Peak	Spacewatch	·	1.1 km	MPC · JPL
686826	2011 DJ_{9}	—	September 23, 2008	Kitt Peak	Spacewatch	VER	2.5 km	MPC · JPL
686827	2011 DP_{16}	—	October 24, 2003	Apache Point	SDSS Collaboration	EOS	1.6 km	MPC · JPL
686828	2011 DP_{17}	—	February 26, 2011	Mount Lemmon	Mount Lemmon Survey	·	1 km	MPC · JPL
686829	2011 DK_{21}	—	October 22, 2003	Apache Point	SDSS Collaboration	·	2.5 km	MPC · JPL
686830	2011 DL_{23}	—	February 26, 2011	Kitt Peak	Spacewatch	·	1.8 km	MPC · JPL
686831	2011 DK_{26}	—	February 25, 2011	Mount Lemmon	Mount Lemmon Survey	·	1.7 km	MPC · JPL
686832	2011 DX_{26}	—	February 25, 2011	Mount Lemmon	Mount Lemmon Survey	VER	2.6 km	MPC · JPL
686833	2011 DF_{28}	—	February 10, 2011	Mount Lemmon	Mount Lemmon Survey	·	810 m	MPC · JPL
686834	2011 DM_{31}	—	March 16, 2007	Kitt Peak	Spacewatch	·	990 m	MPC · JPL
686835	2011 DB_{33}	—	February 25, 2011	Mount Lemmon	Mount Lemmon Survey	·	1.4 km	MPC · JPL
686836	2011 DJ_{33}	—	February 25, 2011	Mount Lemmon	Mount Lemmon Survey	THM	2.0 km	MPC · JPL
686837	2011 DT_{35}	—	February 25, 2011	Mount Lemmon	Mount Lemmon Survey	MAS	650 m	MPC · JPL
686838	2011 DP_{44}	—	February 26, 2011	Mount Lemmon	Mount Lemmon Survey	EOS	1.5 km	MPC · JPL
686839	2011 DM_{45}	—	February 26, 2011	Mount Lemmon	Mount Lemmon Survey	·	1.8 km	MPC · JPL
686840	2011 DT_{45}	—	October 22, 2009	Mount Lemmon	Mount Lemmon Survey	AGN	1.1 km	MPC · JPL
686841	2011 DV_{48}	—	January 17, 2007	Kitt Peak	Spacewatch	·	1.2 km	MPC · JPL
686842	2011 DA_{53}	—	February 25, 2011	Mount Lemmon	Mount Lemmon Survey	EOS	1.4 km	MPC · JPL
686843	2011 DL_{55}	—	February 22, 2011	Kitt Peak	Spacewatch	·	1.2 km	MPC · JPL
686844	2011 DD_{57}	—	February 25, 2011	Mount Lemmon	Mount Lemmon Survey	·	950 m	MPC · JPL
686845	2011 DH_{58}	—	February 23, 2011	Kitt Peak	Spacewatch	EUN	790 m	MPC · JPL
686846	2011 ED_{4}	—	March 1, 2011	Mount Lemmon	Mount Lemmon Survey	·	420 m	MPC · JPL
686847	2011 ED_{19}	—	July 30, 2008	Mount Lemmon	Mount Lemmon Survey	·	2.2 km	MPC · JPL
686848	2011 EZ_{20}	—	September 18, 2003	Kitt Peak	Spacewatch	EOS	2.0 km	MPC · JPL
686849	2011 EX_{22}	—	March 4, 2011	Mount Lemmon	Mount Lemmon Survey	MAS	630 m	MPC · JPL
686850	2011 EC_{32}	—	January 28, 2011	Kitt Peak	Spacewatch	·	1.2 km	MPC · JPL
686851	2011 EG_{32}	—	March 4, 2011	Mount Lemmon	Mount Lemmon Survey	·	2.1 km	MPC · JPL
686852	2011 EU_{33}	—	February 23, 2011	Kitt Peak	Spacewatch	·	2.7 km	MPC · JPL
686853	2011 EJ_{34}	—	November 21, 2017	Mount Lemmon	Mount Lemmon Survey	(5)	1.1 km	MPC · JPL
686854	2011 EE_{36}	—	June 2, 2003	Cerro Tololo	Deep Ecliptic Survey	·	1.2 km	MPC · JPL
686855	2011 ER_{37}	—	March 6, 2011	Kitt Peak	Spacewatch	·	1.1 km	MPC · JPL
686856	2011 EY_{38}	—	March 2, 2011	Kitt Peak	Spacewatch	(194)	1.4 km	MPC · JPL
686857	2011 EP_{41}	—	February 9, 2005	Mount Lemmon	Mount Lemmon Survey	·	2.9 km	MPC · JPL
686858	2011 EN_{48}	—	March 10, 2011	Mount Lemmon	Mount Lemmon Survey	·	2.6 km	MPC · JPL
686859	2011 EV_{48}	—	March 10, 2011	Mount Lemmon	Mount Lemmon Survey	·	1.0 km	MPC · JPL
686860	2011 EU_{58}	—	March 12, 2011	Mount Lemmon	Mount Lemmon Survey	TEL	1.1 km	MPC · JPL
686861	2011 EC_{61}	—	March 12, 2011	Mount Lemmon	Mount Lemmon Survey	H	340 m	MPC · JPL
686862	2011 ET_{64}	—	January 28, 2007	Mount Lemmon	Mount Lemmon Survey	·	1.0 km	MPC · JPL
686863	2011 EV_{65}	—	March 10, 2011	Kitt Peak	Spacewatch	·	2.7 km	MPC · JPL
686864	2011 EX_{72}	—	March 11, 2011	Kitt Peak	Spacewatch	H	440 m	MPC · JPL
686865	2011 EV_{90}	—	March 14, 2011	Mount Lemmon	Mount Lemmon Survey	(5)	850 m	MPC · JPL
686866	2011 EF_{91}	—	October 3, 2013	Catalina	CSS	·	1.3 km	MPC · JPL
686867	2011 ER_{92}	—	September 19, 2008	Kitt Peak	Spacewatch	VER	2.4 km	MPC · JPL
686868	2011 EQ_{93}	—	January 15, 2015	Haleakala	Pan-STARRS 1	·	1.1 km	MPC · JPL
686869	2011 EH_{96}	—	January 25, 2015	Haleakala	Pan-STARRS 1	·	930 m	MPC · JPL
686870	2011 ET_{98}	—	January 14, 2015	Haleakala	Pan-STARRS 1	·	1.3 km	MPC · JPL
686871	2011 EE_{100}	—	April 4, 1998	Kitt Peak	Spacewatch	·	530 m	MPC · JPL
686872	2011 ET_{101}	—	March 10, 2011	Kitt Peak	Spacewatch	·	1.1 km	MPC · JPL
686873	2011 ED_{104}	—	March 2, 2011	Mount Lemmon	Mount Lemmon Survey	·	2.6 km	MPC · JPL
686874	2011 EV_{109}	—	March 2, 2011	Mount Lemmon	Mount Lemmon Survey	·	1.5 km	MPC · JPL
686875	2011 EO_{110}	—	March 14, 2011	Mount Lemmon	Mount Lemmon Survey	(5)	1.1 km	MPC · JPL
686876	2011 EL_{112}	—	March 9, 2011	Mount Lemmon	Mount Lemmon Survey	·	1.1 km	MPC · JPL
686877	2011 EP_{114}	—	March 2, 2011	Mount Lemmon	Mount Lemmon Survey	·	500 m	MPC · JPL
686878	2011 FP	—	March 22, 2011	Bergisch Gladbach	W. Bickel	·	1.0 km	MPC · JPL
686879	2011 FM_{1}	—	March 24, 2011	Nogales	Robbins, I.	·	3.2 km	MPC · JPL
686880	2011 FT_{8}	—	October 26, 2009	Mount Lemmon	Mount Lemmon Survey	·	2.6 km	MPC · JPL
686881	2011 FU_{8}	—	March 26, 2011	Mount Lemmon	Mount Lemmon Survey	·	2.6 km	MPC · JPL
686882	2011 FC_{9}	—	March 27, 2011	Mount Lemmon	Mount Lemmon Survey	·	1.0 km	MPC · JPL
686883	2011 FA_{10}	—	December 15, 2004	Kitt Peak	Spacewatch	·	3.0 km	MPC · JPL
686884	2011 FZ_{14}	—	March 28, 2011	Mount Lemmon	Mount Lemmon Survey	·	560 m	MPC · JPL
686885	2011 FX_{15}	—	July 14, 2004	Siding Spring	SSS	·	1.2 km	MPC · JPL
686886	2011 FY_{21}	—	March 26, 2011	Mount Lemmon	Mount Lemmon Survey	·	1.2 km	MPC · JPL
686887	2011 FU_{28}	—	September 11, 2004	Kitt Peak	Spacewatch	H	400 m	MPC · JPL
686888	2011 FU_{38}	—	March 30, 2011	Mount Lemmon	Mount Lemmon Survey	·	1.0 km	MPC · JPL
686889	2011 FP_{39}	—	April 20, 2007	Kitt Peak	Spacewatch	·	1.1 km	MPC · JPL
686890	2011 FR_{40}	—	March 2, 2011	Mount Lemmon	Mount Lemmon Survey	MRX	900 m	MPC · JPL
686891	2011 FW_{42}	—	April 25, 2007	Kitt Peak	Spacewatch	·	1.2 km	MPC · JPL
686892	2011 FS_{49}	—	March 30, 2011	Mount Lemmon	Mount Lemmon Survey	·	1.1 km	MPC · JPL
686893	2011 FL_{50}	—	April 5, 2003	Kitt Peak	Spacewatch	·	1.1 km	MPC · JPL
686894	2011 FR_{50}	—	October 6, 2008	Kitt Peak	Spacewatch	·	2.1 km	MPC · JPL
686895	2011 FW_{52}	—	October 30, 2008	Mount Lemmon	Mount Lemmon Survey	·	2.7 km	MPC · JPL
686896	2011 FB_{54}	—	March 28, 2011	Piszkés-tető	K. Sárneczky, Z. Kuli	·	980 m	MPC · JPL
686897	2011 FT_{57}	—	March 11, 2011	Kitt Peak	Spacewatch	·	1.1 km	MPC · JPL
686898	2011 FJ_{58}	—	March 30, 2011	Mount Lemmon	Mount Lemmon Survey	·	510 m	MPC · JPL
686899	2011 FK_{58}	—	October 20, 2008	Mount Lemmon	Mount Lemmon Survey	·	2.2 km	MPC · JPL
686900	2011 FU_{60}	—	August 19, 2001	Cerro Tololo	Deep Ecliptic Survey	THM	2.1 km	MPC · JPL

== 686901–687000 ==
back to top

Designation			Discovery			Properties		Ref
Permanent	Provisional	Named after	Date	Site	Discoverer(s)	Category	Diam.	Ref
686901	2011 FB_{64}	—	September 22, 2008	Mount Lemmon	Mount Lemmon Survey	·	2.6 km	MPC · JPL
686902	2011 FF_{65}	—	March 11, 2011	Kitt Peak	Spacewatch	·	1.3 km	MPC · JPL
686903	2011 FQ_{69}	—	March 14, 2011	Mount Lemmon	Mount Lemmon Survey	·	1.3 km	MPC · JPL
686904	2011 FU_{72}	—	November 21, 2003	Kitt Peak	Spacewatch	·	2.7 km	MPC · JPL
686905	2011 FG_{73}	—	March 4, 2011	Kitt Peak	Spacewatch	·	1.9 km	MPC · JPL
686906	2011 FO_{74}	—	March 9, 2007	Mount Lemmon	Mount Lemmon Survey	·	780 m	MPC · JPL
686907	2011 FM_{75}	—	September 25, 2009	Kitt Peak	Spacewatch	·	1.2 km	MPC · JPL
686908	2011 FO_{75}	—	February 23, 2007	Mount Lemmon	Mount Lemmon Survey	·	870 m	MPC · JPL
686909	2011 FL_{79}	—	April 30, 2003	Kitt Peak	Spacewatch	·	1 km	MPC · JPL
686910	2011 FB_{83}	—	March 30, 2011	Mount Lemmon	Mount Lemmon Survey	·	1.0 km	MPC · JPL
686911	2011 FY_{83}	—	May 29, 2000	Kitt Peak	Spacewatch	·	2.9 km	MPC · JPL
686912	2011 FV_{84}	—	April 15, 2007	Kitt Peak	Spacewatch	·	1.1 km	MPC · JPL
686913	2011 FV_{88}	—	March 25, 2011	Haleakala	Pan-STARRS 1	·	930 m	MPC · JPL
686914	2011 FA_{90}	—	March 27, 2011	Mount Lemmon	Mount Lemmon Survey	ADE	1.4 km	MPC · JPL
686915	2011 FZ_{92}	—	September 9, 2008	Mount Lemmon	Mount Lemmon Survey	·	1.1 km	MPC · JPL
686916	2011 FO_{95}	—	March 29, 2011	Mount Lemmon	Mount Lemmon Survey	·	940 m	MPC · JPL
686917	2011 FT_{95}	—	March 29, 2011	Mount Lemmon	Mount Lemmon Survey	·	540 m	MPC · JPL
686918	2011 FN_{96}	—	March 29, 2011	Mount Lemmon	Mount Lemmon Survey	HNS	760 m	MPC · JPL
686919	2011 FS_{97}	—	March 29, 2011	Mount Lemmon	Mount Lemmon Survey	·	1.1 km	MPC · JPL
686920	2011 FP_{98}	—	October 22, 2009	Mount Lemmon	Mount Lemmon Survey	(5)	970 m	MPC · JPL
686921	2011 FB_{100}	—	May 25, 2006	Kitt Peak	Spacewatch	VER	2.4 km	MPC · JPL
686922	2011 FT_{104}	—	April 2, 2011	Mount Lemmon	Mount Lemmon Survey	EUN	1.1 km	MPC · JPL
686923	2011 FG_{105}	—	April 21, 2006	Kitt Peak	Spacewatch	HYG	2.5 km	MPC · JPL
686924	2011 FW_{107}	—	April 5, 2011	Mount Lemmon	Mount Lemmon Survey	·	1.4 km	MPC · JPL
686925	2011 FG_{110}	—	April 19, 2006	Mount Lemmon	Mount Lemmon Survey	EOS	1.6 km	MPC · JPL
686926	2011 FT_{112}	—	November 6, 2008	Mount Lemmon	Mount Lemmon Survey	VER	2.6 km	MPC · JPL
686927	2011 FN_{115}	—	April 2, 2011	Mount Lemmon	Mount Lemmon Survey	·	1.2 km	MPC · JPL
686928	2011 FY_{123}	—	April 1, 2011	Mount Lemmon	Mount Lemmon Survey	·	1.1 km	MPC · JPL
686929	2011 FZ_{126}	—	December 12, 2006	Mount Lemmon	Mount Lemmon Survey	V	660 m	MPC · JPL
686930	2011 FR_{129}	—	April 5, 2011	Mount Lemmon	Mount Lemmon Survey	·	500 m	MPC · JPL
686931	2011 FT_{130}	—	March 2, 2011	Mount Lemmon	Mount Lemmon Survey	MIS	1.6 km	MPC · JPL
686932	2011 FE_{131}	—	March 29, 2011	Mount Lemmon	Mount Lemmon Survey	·	920 m	MPC · JPL
686933	2011 FP_{131}	—	April 5, 2011	Mount Lemmon	Mount Lemmon Survey	JUN	700 m	MPC · JPL
686934	2011 FP_{139}	—	September 6, 2008	Mount Lemmon	Mount Lemmon Survey	·	2.4 km	MPC · JPL
686935	2011 FP_{149}	—	February 25, 2011	Kitt Peak	Spacewatch	·	1.4 km	MPC · JPL
686936	2011 FY_{154}	—	March 29, 2011	Catalina	CSS	·	1.4 km	MPC · JPL
686937	2011 FD_{160}	—	August 28, 2013	Mount Lemmon	Mount Lemmon Survey	·	1.5 km	MPC · JPL
686938	2011 FK_{161}	—	January 15, 2015	Haleakala	Pan-STARRS 1	·	1.3 km	MPC · JPL
686939	2011 FW_{162}	—	April 5, 2011	Catalina	CSS	PHO	780 m	MPC · JPL
686940	2011 FV_{164}	—	February 27, 2015	Mount Lemmon	Mount Lemmon Survey	·	1.3 km	MPC · JPL
686941	2011 FJ_{168}	—	March 28, 2011	Zelenchukskaya Stn	T. V. Krjačko, Satovski, B.	·	1.3 km	MPC · JPL
686942	2011 FV_{170}	—	March 27, 2011	Mount Lemmon	Mount Lemmon Survey	·	1.4 km	MPC · JPL
686943	2011 FA_{171}	—	March 26, 2011	Kitt Peak	Spacewatch	·	1.2 km	MPC · JPL
686944	2011 FX_{171}	—	March 26, 2011	Mount Lemmon	Mount Lemmon Survey	·	1.2 km	MPC · JPL
686945	2011 GJ_{2}	—	January 26, 1998	Kitt Peak	Spacewatch	·	1.1 km	MPC · JPL
686946	2011 GS_{2}	—	March 27, 2011	Mount Lemmon	Mount Lemmon Survey	·	1.3 km	MPC · JPL
686947	2011 GM_{3}	—	March 15, 2007	Mount Lemmon	Mount Lemmon Survey	·	1.3 km	MPC · JPL
686948	2011 GS_{3}	—	March 27, 2011	Mount Lemmon	Mount Lemmon Survey	·	1.1 km	MPC · JPL
686949	2011 GV_{4}	—	April 1, 2011	Mount Lemmon	Mount Lemmon Survey	·	650 m	MPC · JPL
686950	2011 GZ_{12}	—	April 1, 2011	Mount Lemmon	Mount Lemmon Survey	·	710 m	MPC · JPL
686951	2011 GS_{13}	—	April 1, 2011	Mount Lemmon	Mount Lemmon Survey	·	1.3 km	MPC · JPL
686952	2011 GO_{15}	—	September 11, 2007	Kitt Peak	Spacewatch	·	3.0 km	MPC · JPL
686953	2011 GW_{15}	—	April 1, 2011	Mount Lemmon	Mount Lemmon Survey	·	1.3 km	MPC · JPL
686954	2011 GR_{16}	—	September 14, 2007	Mount Lemmon	Mount Lemmon Survey	·	2.6 km	MPC · JPL
686955	2011 GV_{16}	—	September 29, 2008	Kitt Peak	Spacewatch	·	1.3 km	MPC · JPL
686956	2011 GX_{16}	—	April 1, 2011	Mount Lemmon	Mount Lemmon Survey	·	570 m	MPC · JPL
686957	2011 GO_{17}	—	September 3, 2008	Kitt Peak	Spacewatch	·	1.3 km	MPC · JPL
686958	2011 GL_{19}	—	November 6, 2005	Kitt Peak	Spacewatch	·	1.0 km	MPC · JPL
686959	2011 GH_{22}	—	February 4, 2005	Mount Lemmon	Mount Lemmon Survey	EOS	1.5 km	MPC · JPL
686960	2011 GT_{29}	—	April 1, 2011	Kitt Peak	Spacewatch	·	1.3 km	MPC · JPL
686961	2011 GD_{33}	—	April 3, 2011	Haleakala	Pan-STARRS 1	·	930 m	MPC · JPL
686962	2011 GG_{35}	—	April 15, 2007	Kitt Peak	Spacewatch	·	840 m	MPC · JPL
686963	2011 GJ_{42}	—	September 25, 2008	Kitt Peak	Spacewatch	·	1.5 km	MPC · JPL
686964	2011 GM_{44}	—	April 5, 2011	Siding Spring	SSS	ATE · PHA	410 m	MPC · JPL
686965	2011 GQ_{45}	—	April 5, 2011	Mount Lemmon	Mount Lemmon Survey	·	2.2 km	MPC · JPL
686966	2011 GE_{49}	—	April 3, 2011	Haleakala	Pan-STARRS 1	·	870 m	MPC · JPL
686967	2011 GD_{50}	—	March 4, 2011	Kitt Peak	Spacewatch	·	2.6 km	MPC · JPL
686968	2011 GT_{52}	—	March 14, 2011	Kitt Peak	Spacewatch	·	1.3 km	MPC · JPL
686969	2011 GA_{54}	—	April 5, 2011	Mount Lemmon	Mount Lemmon Survey	·	530 m	MPC · JPL
686970	2011 GK_{60}	—	April 19, 2007	Kitt Peak	Spacewatch	·	1.3 km	MPC · JPL
686971	2011 GJ_{68}	—	May 12, 2007	Kitt Peak	Spacewatch	·	1.2 km	MPC · JPL
686972	2011 GJ_{71}	—	April 1, 2011	Mount Lemmon	Mount Lemmon Survey	H	300 m	MPC · JPL
686973	2011 GO_{71}	—	April 15, 2011	Haleakala	Pan-STARRS 1	H	350 m	MPC · JPL
686974	2011 GB_{74}	—	April 13, 2011	Mount Lemmon	Mount Lemmon Survey	·	1.3 km	MPC · JPL
686975	2011 GH_{76}	—	April 14, 2011	Mount Lemmon	Mount Lemmon Survey	ADE	1.3 km	MPC · JPL
686976	2011 GC_{77}	—	April 6, 2011	Kitt Peak	Spacewatch	·	1.4 km	MPC · JPL
686977	2011 GE_{87}	—	April 1, 2011	Kitt Peak	Spacewatch	·	1.2 km	MPC · JPL
686978	2011 GR_{89}	—	April 3, 2011	Haleakala	Pan-STARRS 1	·	500 m	MPC · JPL
686979	2011 GR_{90}	—	September 6, 2004	Palomar	NEAT	EUN	1.1 km	MPC · JPL
686980	2011 GO_{91}	—	January 23, 2014	Catalina	CSS	·	1.5 km	MPC · JPL
686981	2011 GC_{92}	—	April 12, 2011	Mount Lemmon	Mount Lemmon Survey	ADE	1.9 km	MPC · JPL
686982	2011 GQ_{92}	—	November 1, 2013	Haleakala	Pan-STARRS 1	·	1.4 km	MPC · JPL
686983	2011 GU_{92}	—	November 28, 2013	Kitt Peak	Spacewatch	·	1.3 km	MPC · JPL
686984	2011 GD_{93}	—	April 12, 2011	Mount Lemmon	Mount Lemmon Survey	·	1.3 km	MPC · JPL
686985	2011 GH_{93}	—	June 8, 2016	Mount Lemmon	Mount Lemmon Survey	·	1.3 km	MPC · JPL
686986	2011 GP_{93}	—	November 28, 2013	Mount Lemmon	Mount Lemmon Survey	·	1.2 km	MPC · JPL
686987	2011 GA_{94}	—	August 16, 2012	Siding Spring	SSS	·	1.4 km	MPC · JPL
686988	2011 GZ_{94}	—	January 12, 2016	Kitt Peak	Spacewatch	·	2.2 km	MPC · JPL
686989	2011 GQ_{96}	—	April 5, 2011	Kitt Peak	Spacewatch	·	470 m	MPC · JPL
686990	2011 GS_{96}	—	January 17, 2016	Haleakala	Pan-STARRS 1	T_{j} (2.99) · EUP	3.1 km	MPC · JPL
686991	2011 GG_{97}	—	January 16, 2015	Haleakala	Pan-STARRS 1	·	950 m	MPC · JPL
686992	2011 GE_{98}	—	August 24, 2016	Kitt Peak	Spacewatch	·	1.2 km	MPC · JPL
686993	2011 GF_{98}	—	May 18, 2015	Haleakala	Pan-STARRS 1	·	730 m	MPC · JPL
686994	2011 GJ_{98}	—	April 6, 2011	Mount Lemmon	Mount Lemmon Survey	·	660 m	MPC · JPL
686995	2011 GF_{100}	—	April 14, 2011	Mount Lemmon	Mount Lemmon Survey	·	1.2 km	MPC · JPL
686996	2011 GW_{100}	—	April 2, 2011	Haleakala	Pan-STARRS 1	·	1.1 km	MPC · JPL
686997	2011 GZ_{101}	—	April 1, 2011	Kitt Peak	Spacewatch	·	2.4 km	MPC · JPL
686998	2011 GP_{102}	—	April 5, 2011	Mount Lemmon	Mount Lemmon Survey	·	1.1 km	MPC · JPL
686999	2011 GN_{103}	—	April 3, 2011	Haleakala	Pan-STARRS 1	EUN	860 m	MPC · JPL
687000	2011 GQ_{104}	—	April 1, 2011	Kitt Peak	Spacewatch	·	490 m	MPC · JPL

back to top
