= Grand tack hypothesis =

Theory of early changes in Jupiter's orbit

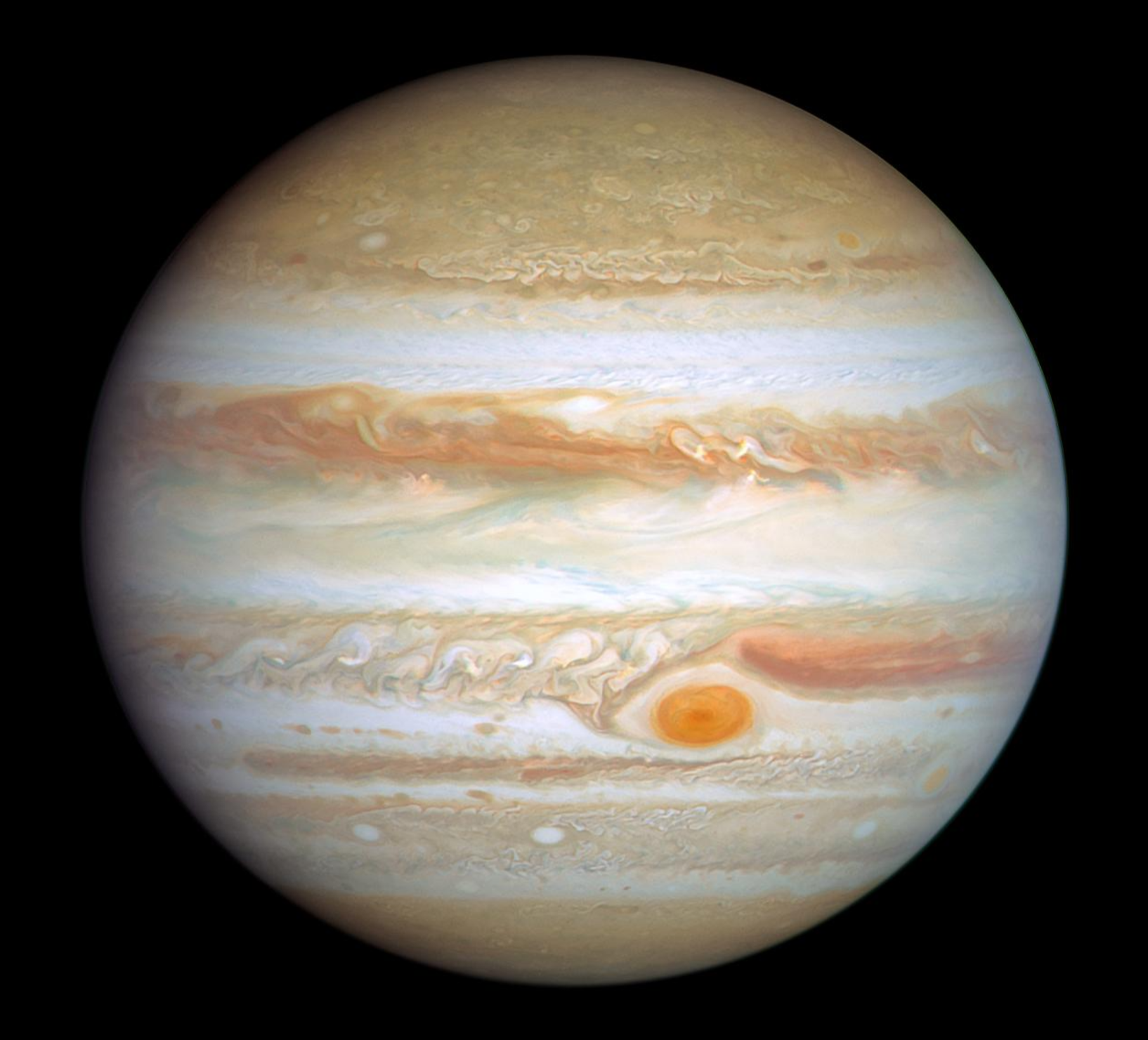
Jupiter might have shaped the Solar System on its grand tack

In planetary astronomy, the grand tack hypothesis proposes that Jupiter formed at a distance of 3.5 AU from the Sun, then migrated inward to 1.5 AU, before reversing course due to capturing Saturn in an orbital resonance, eventually halting near its current orbit at 5.2 AU. The reversal of Jupiter's planetary migration is likened to the path of a sailboat changing directions (tacking) as it travels against the wind.

According to the hypothesis, the planetesimal disk was truncated at 1.0 AU by Jupiter's migration, limiting the material available to form Mars. Jupiter twice crossed the asteroid belt, scattering asteroids outward then inward. This resulted in the asteroid belt having a small mass, a wide range of inclinations and eccentricities, and a population originating from both inside and outside Jupiter's original orbit. Debris produced by collisions among planetesimals swept ahead of Jupiter may have driven an early generation of planets into the Sun.

== Description ==
In the grand tack hypothesis, Jupiter underwent a two-phase migration after its formation, migrating inward to 1.5 AU before reversing course and migrating outward. Jupiter's formation took place near the ice line, at roughly 3.5 AU.

After clearing a gap in the gas disk Jupiter underwent type II migration, moving slowly toward the Sun with the gas disk. If uninterrupted, this migration would have left Jupiter in a close orbit around the Sun, similar to hot Jupiters in other planetary systems. Saturn also migrated toward the Sun, but being smaller it migrated faster, undergoing either type I migration or runaway migration. Saturn converged on Jupiter and was captured in a 2:3 mean-motion resonance with Jupiter during this migration. An overlapping gap in the gas disk then formed around Jupiter and Saturn, altering the balance of forces on these planets which began migrating together. Saturn partially cleared its part of the gap reducing the torque exerted on Jupiter by the outer disk.

The net torque on the planets then became positive, with the torques generated by the inner Lindblad resonances exceeding those from the outer disk, and the planets began to migrate outward. The outward migration was able to continue because interactions between the planets allowed gas to stream through the gap. The gas exchanged angular momentum with the planets during its passage, adding to the positive balance of torques, allowing the planets to migrate outward relative to the disk; the exchange also transferred mass from the outer disk to the inner disk. The transfer of gas to the inner disk also slowed the reduction of the inner disk's mass relative to the outer disk as it accreted onto the Sun, which otherwise would weaken the inner torque, ending the giant planets' outward migration. In the grand tack hypothesis this process is assumed to have reversed the inward migration of the planets when Jupiter was at 1.5 AU. The outward migration of Jupiter and Saturn continued until they reached a zero-torque configuration within a flared disk, or when the gas disk dissipated. The whole process is presumed to end when Jupiter reached its approximate current orbit.

== Scope ==
The hypothesis can be applied to multiple phenomena in the Solar System.

=== Mars problem ===
The "Mars problem" is a conflict between some simulations of the formation of the terrestrial planets which end with a 0.5–1.0 M_{🜨} planet in its region, much larger than the actual mass of Mars: 0.107 M_{🜨}, when begun with planetesimals distributed throughout the inner Solar System. Jupiter's grand tack resolves the Mars problem by limiting the material available to form Mars.

Jupiter's inward migration alters this distribution of material, driving planetesimals inward to form a narrow dense band with a mix of materials inside 1.0 AU, and leaves the Mars region largely empty. Planetary embryos quickly form in the narrow band. Most of these embryos collide and merge to form the larger terrestrial planets (Venus and Earth) over a period of 60 to 130 million years. Others are scattered outside the band where they are deprived of additional material, slowing their growth, and form the lower-mass terrestrial planets Mars and Mercury.

=== Asteroid belt ===
Jupiter and Saturn drive most asteroids from their initial orbits during their migrations, leaving behind an excited remnant derived from both inside and outside Jupiter's original location. Before Jupiter's migrations the surrounding regions contained asteroids which varied in composition with their distance from the Sun. Rocky asteroids dominated the inner region, while more primitive and icy asteroids dominated the outer region beyond the ice line. As Jupiter and Saturn migrate inward, about 15% of the inner asteroids are scattered outward onto orbits beyond Saturn. After reversing course, Jupiter and Saturn first encounter these objects, scattering about 0.5% of the original population back inward onto stable orbits. Later, as Jupiter and Saturn migrate into the outer region, about 0.5% of the primitive asteroids are scattered onto orbits in the outer asteroid belt. The encounters with Jupiter and Saturn leave many of the captured asteroids with large eccentricities and inclinations. These may be reduced during the giant planet instability described in the Nice model so that the eccentricity distribution resembles that of the current asteroid belt. Some of the icy asteroids are also left in orbits crossing the region where the terrestrial planets later formed, allowing water to be delivered to the accreting planets when the icy asteroids collide with them.

=== Absent super-Earths ===
The absence of close orbiting super-Earths in the Solar System may also be the result of Jupiter's inward migration. As Jupiter migrates inward, planetesimals are captured in its mean-motion resonances, causing their orbits to shrink and their eccentricities to grow. A collisional cascade follows as the planetesimals' relative velocities became large enough to produce catastrophic impacts. The resulting debris then spirals inward toward the Sun due to drag from the gas disk. If there were super-Earths in the early Solar System, they would have caught much of this debris in resonances and could have been driven into the Sun as the debris spiraled inward. The current terrestrial planets would then form from planetesimals left behind when Jupiter reversed course. However, the migration of close orbiting super-Earths into the Sun could be avoided if the debris coalesced into larger objects, reducing gas drag; and if the protoplanetary disk had an inner cavity, their inward migration could be halted near its edge. If no planets had yet formed in the inner Solar System, the destruction of the larger bodies during the collisional cascade could have left the remaining debris small enough to be pushed outward by the solar wind, which would have been much stronger during the early Solar System, leaving little to form planets inside Mercury's orbit.

=== Post-hypothesis developments ===
Simulations of the formation of the terrestrial planets using models of the protoplanetary disk that include viscous heating and the migration of the planetary embryos indicate that Jupiter's migration may have reversed at 2.0 AU. In simulations the eccentricities of the embryos are excited by perturbations from Jupiter. As these eccentricities are damped by the denser gas disk of recent models, the semi-major axes of the embryos shrink, shifting the peak density of solids inward. For simulations with Jupiter's migration reversing at 1.5 AU, this resulted in the largest terrestrial planet forming near Venus's orbit rather than at Earth's orbit. Simulations that instead reversed Jupiter's migration at 2.0 AU yielded a closer match to the current Solar System.

When the fragmentation due to hit and run collisions are included in simulations with an early instability the orbits of the terrestrial planets are better produced. The larger numbers of small bodies resulting from these collisions reduce the eccentricities and inclinations of the growing planets orbits via additional collisions and dynamical friction. This also results in a larger fraction of the terrestrial planets mass being concentrated in Venus and Earth and extends their formation times relative to that of Mars.

The migration of the giant planets through the asteroid belt creates a spike in impact velocities that could result in the formation of CB chondrites. CB chondrites are metal rich carbonaceous chondrites containing iron/nickel nodules that formed from the crystallization of impact melts 4.8 ±0.3 Myrs after the first solids. The vaporization of these metals requires impacts of greater than 18 km/s, well beyond the maximum of 12.2 km/s in standard accretion models. Jupiter's migration across the asteroid belt increases the eccentricities and inclinations of the asteroids, resulting in a 0.5 Myr period of impact velocities sufficient to vaporize metals. If the formation of CB chondrites was due to Jupiter's migration it would have occurred 4.5–5 Myr after the formation of the Solar System.

The presence of a thick atmosphere around Titan and its absence around Ganymede and Callisto may be due to the timing of their formation relative to the grand tack. If Ganymede and Callisto formed before the grand tack their atmospheres would have been lost as Jupiter moved closer to the Sun. However, for Titan to avoid Type I migration into Saturn, and for Titan's atmosphere to survive, it must have formed after the grand tack.

Encounters with other embryos could destabilize a disk orbiting Mars reducing the mass of moons that form around Mars. After Mars is scattered from the annulus by encounters with other planets it continues to have encounters with other objects until the planets clear material from the inner Solar System. While these encounters enable the orbit of Mars to become decoupled from the other planets and remain on a stable orbit, they can also perturb the disk of material from which the moons of Mars form. These perturbations cause material to escape from the orbit of Mars or to impact on its surface reducing the mass of the disk resulting in the formation of smaller moons.

== Potential problems ==
Most of the accretion of Mars must have taken place outside the narrow annulus of material formed by the grand tack if Mars has a different composition than Earth and Venus. The planets that grow in the annulus created by the grand tack end with similar compositions. If the grand tack occurred early, while the embryo that became Mars was relatively small, a Mars with a differing composition could form if it was instead scattered outward then inward like the asteroids. The chance of this occurring is roughly 2%.

Later studies have shown that the convergent orbital migration of Jupiter and Saturn in the fading solar nebula is unlikely to establish a 3:2 mean-motion resonance. Instead of supporting a faster runaway migration, nebula conditions lead to a slower migration of Saturn and its capture in a 2:1 mean-motion resonance. Capture of Jupiter and Saturn in the 2:1 mean-motion resonance does not typically reverse the direction of migration, but particular nebula configurations have been identified that may drive outward migration. These configurations, however, tend to excite Jupiter's and Saturn's orbital eccentricity to values between two and three times as large as their actual values. Also, if the temperature and viscosity of the gas allow Saturn to produce a deeper gap, the resulting net torque can again become negative, resulting in the inward migration of the system.

The grand tack scenario ignores the ongoing accretion of gas on both Jupiter and Saturn. In fact, to drive outward migration and move the planets to the proximity of their current orbits, the solar nebula had to contain a sufficiently large reservoir of gas around the orbits of the two planets. However, this gas would provide a source for accretion, which would affect the growth of Jupiter and Saturn and their mass ratio. The type of nebula density required for capture in the 3:2 mean-motion resonance is especially dangerous for the survival of the two planets, because it can lead to significant mass growth and ensuing planet-planet scattering. But conditions leading to 2:1 mean-motion resonant systems may also put the planets in danger. Accretion of gas on both planets also tends to reduce the supply toward the inner disk, lowering the accretion rate toward the Sun. This process works to deplete somewhat the disk interior to Jupiter's orbit, weakening the torques on Jupiter arising from inner Lindblad resonances and potentially ending the planets' outward migration.

== Alternatives ==
Multiple hypotheses have been offered to explain the small mass of Mars. A small Mars may have been a low probability event as it occurs in a small, but non-zero, fraction of simulations that begin with planetesimals distributed across the entire inner Solar System. A small Mars could be the result of its region having been largely empty due to solid material drifting farther inward before the planetesimals formed. Most of the mass could also have been removed from the Mars region before it formed if the giant planet instability described in the Nice model occurred early. If most of the growth of planetesimals and embryos into terrestrial planets was due to pebble accretion, a small Mars could be the result this process having been less efficient with increasing distances from the Sun. Convergent migration of planetary embryos in the gas disk toward 1 AU would result in the formation of terrestrial planets only near this distance leaving Mars as a stranded embryo. Sweeping secular resonances during the clearing of the gas disk could also excite inclinations and eccentricities, increasing relative velocities so that collisions resulted in fragmentation instead of accretion. A number of these hypotheses could also explain the low mass of the asteroid belt.

A number of hypotheses have also been proposed to explain the orbital eccentricities and inclinations of the asteroids and the low mass of the asteroid belt. If the region of the asteroid belt was initially empty due to few planetesimals forming there it could have been populated by icy planetesimals that were scattered inward during Jupiter's and Saturn's gas accretion, and by stony asteroids that were scattered outward by the forming terrestrial planets. The inward scattered icy planetesimals could also deliver water to the terrestrial region. An initially low-mass asteroid belt could have had its orbital eccentricities and inclinations excited by secular resonances if the resonant orbits of Jupiter and Saturn became chaotic before the instability of the Nice model. The eccentricities and inclinations of the asteroid could also be excited during the giant planet instability, reaching the observed levels if it lasted for a few hundred thousand years. Gravitational interactions between the asteroids and embryos in an initially massive asteroid belt would enhance these effects by altering the asteroids semi-major axes, driving many asteroids into unstable orbits where they were removed due to interactions with the planets, resulting in the loss of more than 99% of its mass. Secular resonance sweeping during the dissipation of the gas disk could have excited the orbits of the asteroids and removed many as they spiraled toward the Sun due to gas drag after their eccentricities were excited.

Several hypotheses have also been offered for the lack of any close orbiting super-Earths and the small mass of Mercury. If Jupiter's core formed close to the Sun, its outward migration across the inner Solar System could have pushed material outward in its resonances, leaving the region inside Venus's orbit depleted. In a protoplanetary disk that was evolving via a disk wind, planetary embryos could have migrated outward before merging to form planets, leaving the Solar System without planets inside Mercury's orbit. Convergent migration of planetary embryos in the gas disk toward 1 AU would also have resulted in the formation of large terrestrial planets near this distance leaving Mercury as a stranded embryo. An early generation of inner planets could have been lost due to catastrophic collisions during an instability, resulting in the debris being ground small enough to be lost due to Poynting-Robertson drag. If planetesimal formation only occurred early, the inner edge of the planetesimal disk might have been located at the silicate condensation line at this time. The formation of planetesimals closer than Mercury's orbit may have required that the magnetic field of the star be aligned with the rotation of the disk, enabling the depletion of the gas so that solid to gas ratios reached values sufficient for streaming instabilities to occur. The formation of super-Earths may require a higher flux of inward drifting pebbles than occurred in the early Solar System. Planetesimals orbiting in a protoplanetary disk closer than 0.6 AU may have eroded away due to a headwind. An early Solar System that was largely depleted of material could have resulted in the formation of small planets that were lost or destroyed in an early instability leaving only Mercury or the formation of only Mercury.

== See also ==
- Formation and evolution of the Solar System
- Jumping-Jupiter scenario
- Late Heavy Bombardment
- Nice model
- Planetary migration
