= Formation of Jupiter =

Formation processes of the planet Jupiter

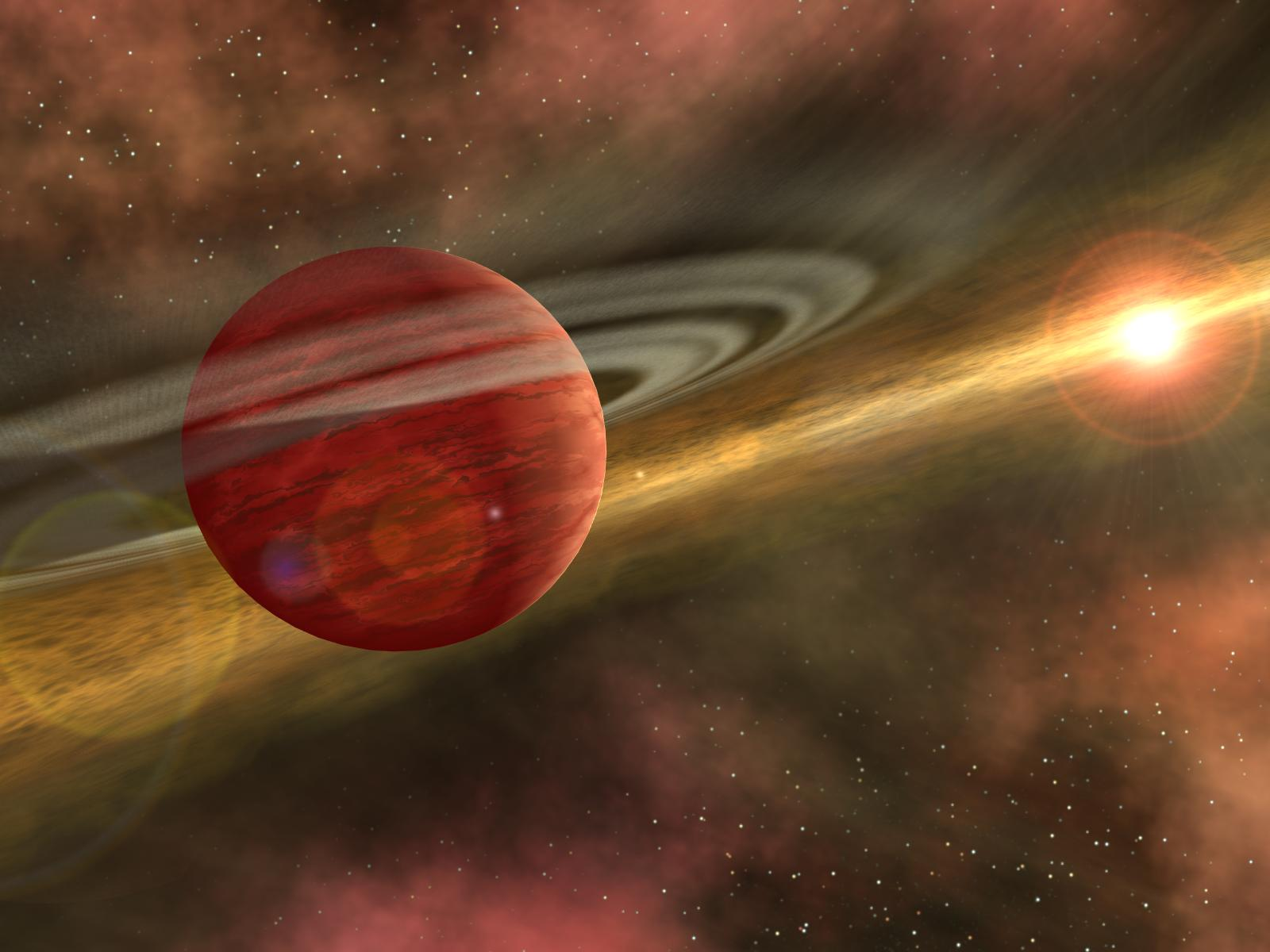
Artist's depiction of a gas giant in formation; Jupiter may have appeared similar during its early stages.

The formation of Jupiter is led by processes that largely follow the same mechanisms by which gas giant planets form according to the solar nebula model.

Following the formation of the Sun, which began approximately 4.6 billion years ago, the residual material, rich in metals, formed a circumstellar disk from which planetesimals initially formed, followed by the aggregation of these into protoplanets.

Jupiter originated from the coalescence of planetesimals located beyond what planetary scientists call the frost line (astrophysics), a boundary beyond which volatile materials with low melting points condense. The fusion of numerous icy planetesimals gave rise, just beyond the frost line, to a large planetary embryo, which, according to a study published in November 2008, (Note: The hypothesis that the planet formed through the coalescence of planetesimals followed by gas accretion is supported by computer simulations indicating that Jupiter has a core about twice as massive as initially hypothesized, with an estimated mass of 14–18 M_{⊕}, capable of accreting large amounts of gas from the solar nebula. As derived from: Militzer et al (2008)) had a mass of approximately 10–18 Earth masses (M_{⊕}). Subsequently, the embryo began to accrete mass rapidly by drawing hydrogen and helium from the gaseous envelope left over from the Sun’s formation, quickly reaching its current mass of 318 M_{⊕}.

The accretion process of the planet was mediated by the formation of a circumplanetary disk. Once the volatile materials, which formed the planet’s atmosphere, were depleted, the remaining rocky materials contributed to the formation of the system of satellites orbiting the planet. This system later expanded through the capture of numerous minor bodies due to Jupiter’s strong gravitational pull.

== Origins ==
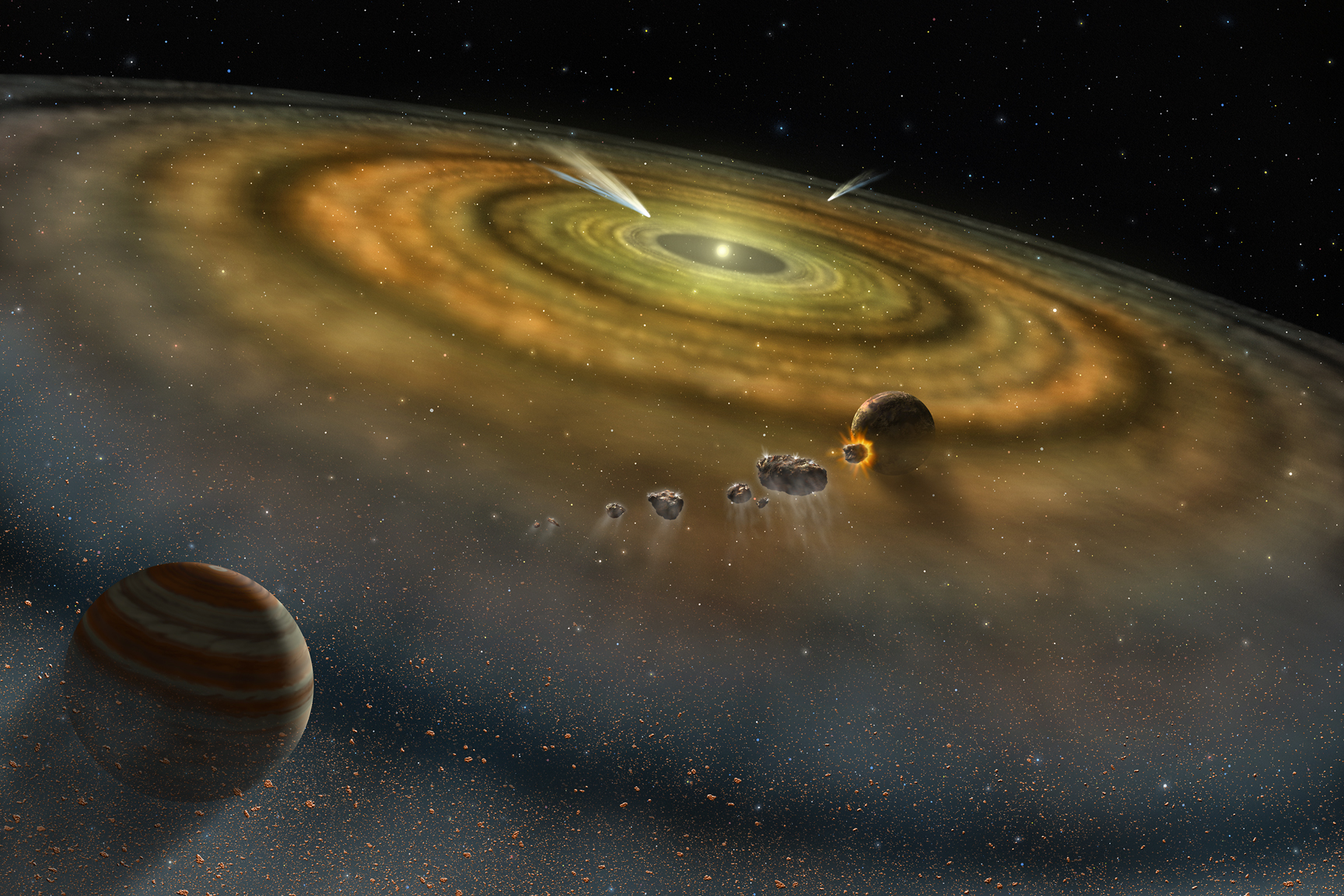
Artist’s depiction of the gas and dust disk surrounding a forming planetary system.

The Sun and the Solar System formed from the gravitational collapse of an extensive molecular cloud in the Orion Arm, triggered approximately 4.7 billion years ago by the explosion of one or more supernovae nearby. It is established that, about 4.57 billion years ago, (Note: The current age of our star was determined using computer models of stellar evolution and nucleocosmochronology.) the rapid collapse of the cloud led to the formation of a generation of young T Tauri stars, including the Sun, which, shortly after its formation, assumed a nearly circular orbit around the Galactic Center, at an average distance of about 26,000 light-years. The calcium–aluminum-rich inclusions left over from star formation then formed a protoplanetary disk around the nascent star.

Within the circumstellar disk, the planetary formation process began. The currently accepted scientific model, the solar nebula model, posits that planets formed from the coalescence of original dust particles orbiting the nascent star. Through direct contact, these dust particles grew, reaching sizes on the order of a kilometer. These large rocky fragments collided, forming larger bodies known as planetesimals. Continuous collisions and mergers of planetesimals led to the formation of increasingly larger bodies, eventually forming the first protoplanets over a few million years.

In the inner Solar System, high temperatures caused planetesimals composed of elements and compounds with high melting points, particularly metals (such as iron, nickel, and aluminum) and rocky silicates, to concentrate, leading to the formation of terrestrial planets.

In the outer Solar System, beyond the so-called frost line (also known as the snow line, located approximately 5 astronomical units – AU from the Sun), lower temperatures favored the accumulation of planetesimals composed of low-melting-point substances, such as water. These icy planetesimals provided the foundation for the formation of gas giants. The abundance of icy planetesimals far exceeded that of rocky ones, enabling gaseous protoplanets to achieve a mass sufficient to trigger the accretion process and accumulate large quantities of hydrogen and helium, abundant in these regions, which formed their extensive atmospheres.

== Condensation and accretion of Proto-Jupiter ==
Jupiter’s formation began with the coalescence of icy planetesimals just beyond the frost line. During its early stages, the planet primarily consisted of solid material with some gas, drawn from the hydrogen and helium envelope left over from the Sun’s formation, confined by the solar radiation and solar wind to these regions of the planetary system. Jupiter’s formation thus combined the accretion of planetesimals with the accumulation of gas from the solar nebula, mediated by the formation of a disk-like structure, the circumplanetary or protolunar disk, akin to a miniature protoplanetary disk.

The accretion of planetesimals, initially more intense than gas accretion, continued until the number of rocky bodies in the orbital band where the planet formed significantly decreased. This process produced a large planetary embryo with a mass, according to computer simulations, of approximately 10–18 Earth masses (M_{⊕}). At this point, the rates of planetesimal and gas accretion became comparable, with gas accretion eventually dominating, driven by the rapid contraction of the accreting gaseous envelope and the expansion of the system’s outer boundary, dependent on the planet’s total mass. Proto-Jupiter grew rapidly, drawing hydrogen from the solar nebula, reaching 150 M_{⊕} in less than a thousand years and its final 318 M_{⊕} in a similar timeframe.

According to astrophysicists, it is no coincidence that Jupiter lies just beyond the frost line. Due to the sublimation of icy material falling toward the inner Solar System, large quantities of water accumulated in this region, creating a low-pressure zone that increased the velocity of orbiting particles, slowing their inward fall toward the Sun. The frost line acted as a barrier, causing a rapid accumulation of material at approximately 5 AU from the Sun.

The formation of the circumplanetary disk marked the transition from indiscriminate accretion from the solar nebula to the planet’s isolation from the protoplanetary disk, halting the accretion process. This isolation phase began when Jupiter consumed most of the gas in its orbital region, creating a gap in the dense interplanetary medium of the protoplanetary disk.

== Origin of natural satellites ==
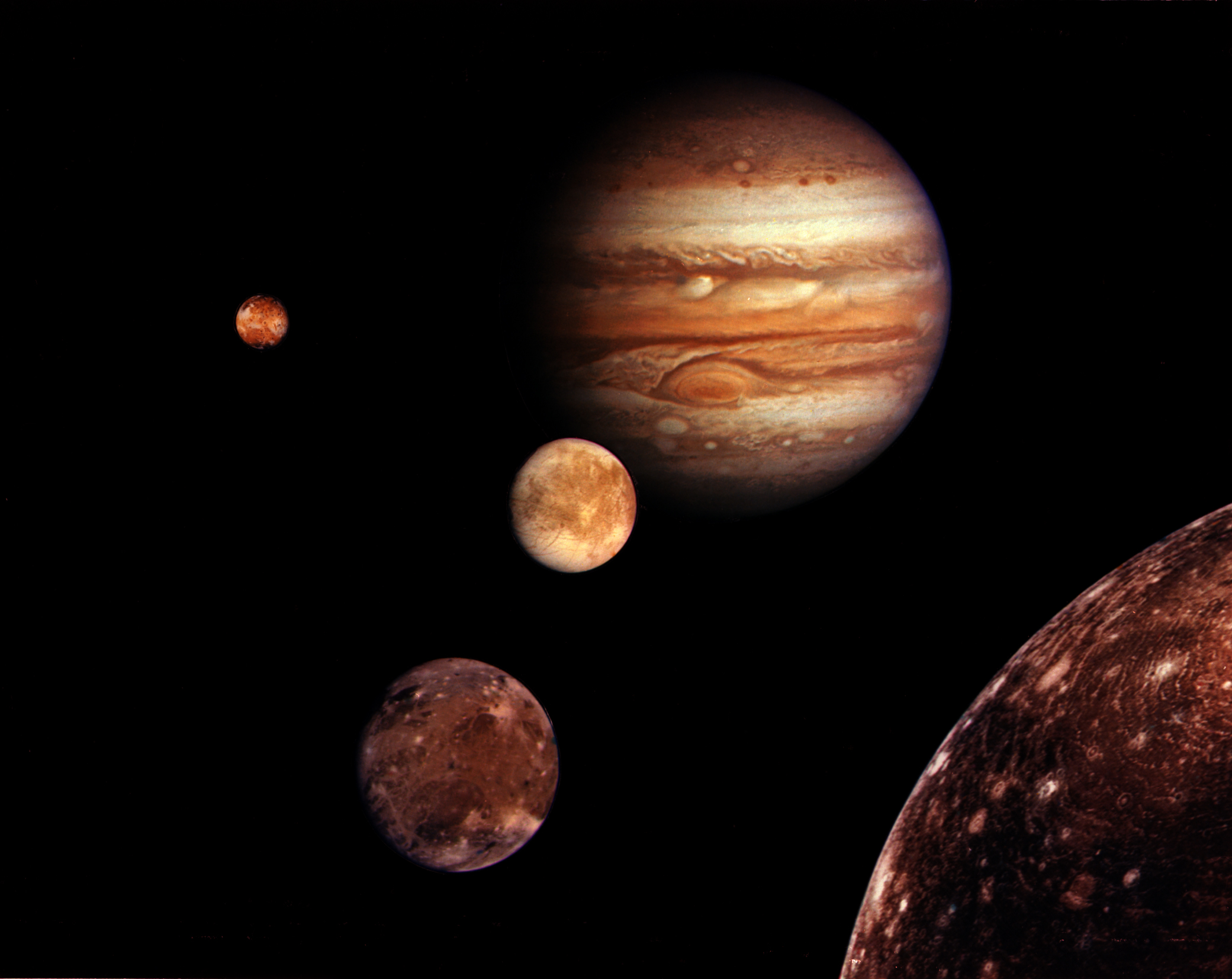
Photomontage of Jupiter with the Galilean moons.

The regular satellites are thought to be remnants of an ancient population of satellites with masses similar to the current Galilean moons, formed from the coalescence of dust in the circumplanetary disk.

Simulations suggest that, despite initially having a relatively low mass, the circumplanetary disk captured and processed a significant fraction of the mass that the forming Jupiter acquired from the solar nebula’s remnants over time. However, based on the masses of the regular satellites, the disk’s mass was likely only about 2% of the planet’s mass, a very low value. It is believed that several generations of satellites (at least four besides the current one) with masses comparable to the Galilean moons existed, each falling toward the planet due to interactions with the circumplanetary disk, while new satellites formed from newly captured dust. During this satellite turnover, the dust constituting the disk significantly decreased, such that the current dust in Jupiter’s system does not significantly affect the orbits of the current (likely fifth) generation of satellites. This generation formed at a greater distance than their current positions and gradually migrated inward due to the loss of angular momentum from friction with the thinning disk, accreting additional material. This inward migration stopped when the orbital resonance linking Io, Europa, and Ganymede was established. Ganymede’s greater mass suggests it migrated faster than Io and Europa.

The outer, irregular satellites likely formed from the capture of passing asteroids while the circumplanetary disk was still massive enough to absorb much of their momentum, trapping them in orbit. Many of these bodies fragmented due to tidal stresses during capture or collisions with smaller objects, producing the satellite families observed today.

== Current orbit and capture of Trojans ==
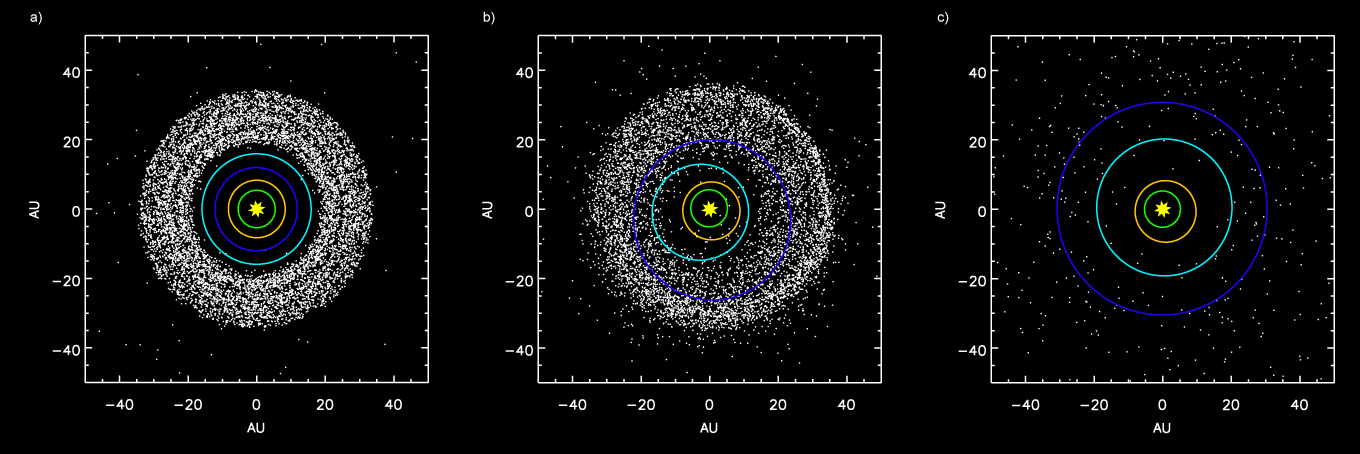
A simulation showing planetary migration affecting the outer planets and the Kuiper Belt in the early Solar System: a) Before the 2:1 Jupiter/Saturn resonance; b) Displacement of Kuiper Belt objects into the Solar System after Neptune’s orbit shift; c) After Jupiter’s ejection of Kuiper Belt bodies.

Computer simulations studying the peculiar orbits of hot Jupiters indicate that Jupiter underwent planetary migration shortly after its formation. The planet likely formed at about 5.65 AU from the Sun and, over the next 100,000 years, drifted inward by approximately 0.45 AU (70 million kilometers) due to the loss of angular momentum caused by friction with the residual dust of the protoplanetary disk, stabilizing in its current orbit and entering a 1:2 resonance with Saturn.

The primary evidence for this migration comes from a group of approximately 700 asteroids in the Hilda family, which are in a 3:2 resonance with Jupiter and predominantly have highly elliptical and eccentric orbits around the Sun. Simulations suggest that Jupiter’s migration significantly perturbed the circular orbits of proto-Hilda asteroids, ejecting some from the Solar System and trapping the rest in their current eccentric orbits.

Another event likely related to Jupiter’s migration is the capture of the Trojan asteroids. The migration of the giant planets destabilized the Kuiper Belt, which, according to the Nice model, was then closer to the Sun (as shown in the accompanying image), scattering millions of minor bodies into the inner Solar System. Additionally, their combined gravitational influence disrupted any pre-existing asteroid systems orbiting at the Lagrangian points L_{4} and L_{5}. Thus, the current Trojan population likely originated from Kuiper Belt objects captured during the migration as Jupiter and Saturn entered their current orbital resonance.

== Bibliography ==
=== General works ===
- Unsöld, Albrecht (1969). The New Cosmos. New York: Springer-Verlag.
- Shipman, H. L. (1984). L'Universo inquieto. Guida all'osservazione a occhio nudo e con il telescopio. Introduzione all'astronomia [The Restless Universe: A Guide to Observation with the Naked Eye and Telescope. Introduction to Astronomy] (in Italian). Bologna: Zanichelli. ISBN 88-08-03170-5.
- Hawking, Stephen (1988). A Brief History of Time. Bantam Books. ISBN 0-553-17521-1.
- Reeves, H. (2000). L'evoluzione cosmica [Cosmic Evolution] (in Italian). Milano: Rizzoli–BUR. ISBN 88-17-25907-1.
- AA.VV (2002). L'Universo - Grande enciclopedia dell'astronomia [The Universe - Great Encyclopedia of Astronomy] (in Italian). Novara: De Agostini.
- Gribbin, J. (2005). Enciclopedia di astronomia e cosmologia [Encyclopedia of Astronomy and Cosmology] (in Italian). Milano: Garzanti. ISBN 88-11-50517-8.
- Owen, W. (2006). Atlante illustrato dell'Universo [Illustrated Atlas of the Universe] (in Italian). Milano: Il Viaggiatore. ISBN 88-365-3679-4.
- M. Rees (2006). Universo. Dal big bang alla nascita dei pianeti. Dal sistema solare alle galassie più remote [Universe: From the Big Bang to the Birth of Planets, from the Solar System to the Most Distant Galaxies] (in Italian). Milano: Mondadori Electa. p. 512.

=== Specific works ===
==== On the Solar System ====
- M. Hack (2003). Alla scoperta del sistema solare [Discovering the Solar System] (in Italian). Milano: Mondadori Electa. p. 264.
- F. Biafore (2008). In viaggio nel sistema solare. Un percorso nello spazio e nel tempo alla luce delle ultime scoperte [Traveling Through the Solar System: A Journey in Space and Time in Light of the Latest Discoveries] (in Italian). Gruppo B. p. 146.
- Various (2006). Encyclopedia of the Solar System. Gruppo B. p. 412. ISBN 0-12-088589-1.

==== On Jupiter ====
- Bertrand M. Peek (1981). The Planet Jupiter: The Observer's Handbook. London: Faber and Faber Limited. ISBN 0-571-18026-4. OCLC 8318939.
- Eric Burgess (1982). By Jupiter: Odysseys to a Giant. New York: Columbia University Press. ISBN 0-231-05176-X.
- John H. Rogers (1995). The Giant Planet Jupiter. Cambridge: Cambridge University Press. ISBN 0-521-41008-8. OCLC 219591510.
- Reta Beebe (1996). Jupiter: The Giant Planet (2 ed.). Washington: Smithsonian Institution Press. ISBN 1-56098-685-9.
- Kelly J. Beatty; Carolyn Collins Peterson; Andrew Chaikin, eds. (1999). The New Solar System (4 ed.). Massachusetts: Sky Publishing Corporation. ISBN 0-933346-86-7. OCLC 39464951.
- D. C. Jewitt; S. Sheppard; C. Porco; F. Bagenal; T. Dowling; W. McKinnon (2004). Jupiter: The Planet, Satellites and Magnetosphere. Cambridge: Cambridge University Press. ISBN 0-521-81808-7.
- Linda T. Elkins-Tanton (2006). Jupiter and Saturn. New York: Chelsea House. ISBN 0-8160-5196-8.
