= Twin binary =

Binary star with near-equal component masses

- Object class: Binary star
- Defining criterion: Mass ratio q = M_{2}/M_{1} ≳ 0.95
- Period range of excess: Below about 40 days
- Excess twin fraction: 0.11 ± 0.04 for P = 2–20 days, early-type
- Observed separations: Below 0.4 AU to several thousand AU
- Proposed origin: Accretion from a circumbinary disc
- First reported: 1979, by Lucy and Ricco

Twin binaries are binary stars whose components have almost equal masses, conventionally a mass ratio q = M_{2}/M_{1} above about 0.95. Such pairs are more common than the smooth mass-ratio distribution that binaries otherwise follow would predict. Leon Lucy and E. Ricco first pointed this excess out in 1979, and it remains debated, partly because no single threshold in q has been agreed upon.

The excess appears among short-period spectroscopic binaries and is confined to orbital periods below roughly 40 days, where twins may account for 10 to 20 per cent of all systems. Measurement is complicated by selection bias, since an unresolved equal-mass pair is 0.75 magnitudes brighter than a comparable single star and is therefore detected to greater distances.

After correction for such effects, the excess twin fraction among early-type binaries with periods of 2 to 20 days is 0.11 ± 0.04, and falls to a value consistent with zero at periods of several hundred days. Observations by Gaia later showed that twins also occur at separations of hundreds to thousands of astronomical units.

Twins are generally thought to form through accretion from a circumbinary disc, which preferentially feeds the lower-mass component and drives q toward unity, implying the pair was already close while still embedded in gas. Mass transfer between pre-main-sequence components would drive the mass ratio the other way, and fission is considered unlikely. How the widest twins reached their present separations, which exceed those of observed circumbinary discs, remains unexplained.

Twin giants that come into contact shed mass through the outer Lagrangian points and leave their cores in a tight central binary, a proposed route to double neutron stars and to planetary nebulae with two degenerate stars at their centres.
