= Pebble accretion =

Accumulation of particles into planetesimals

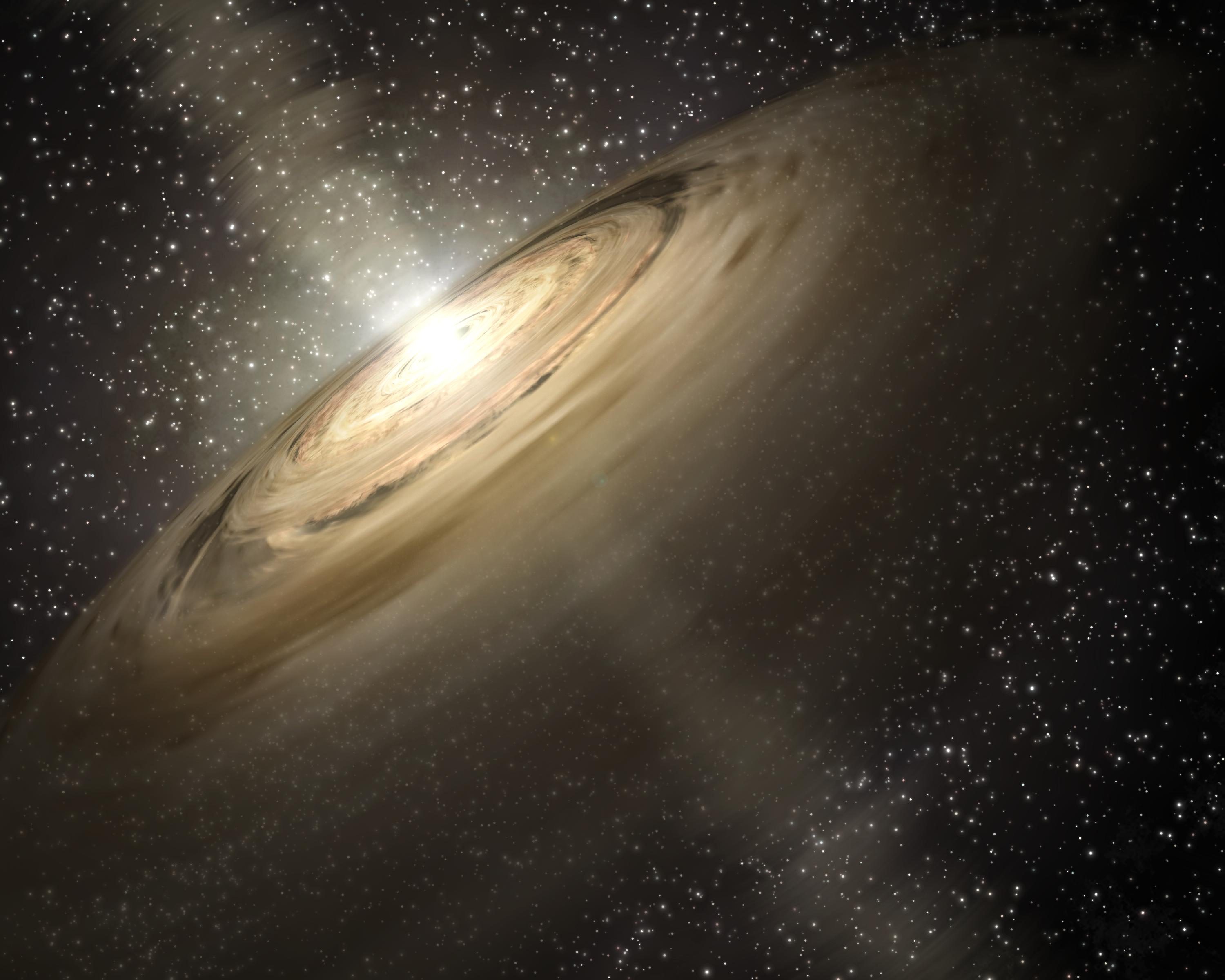
Illustration of a dusty disk in orbit around a young star

Pebble accretion is the accumulation of particles, ranging from centimeters up to meters in diameter, into planetesimals in a protoplanetary disk that is enhanced by aerodynamic drag from the gas present in the disk. This drag reduces the relative velocity of pebbles as they pass by larger bodies, preventing some from escaping the body's gravity. These pebbles are then accreted by the body after spiraling or settling toward its surface. This process increases the cross section over which the large bodies can accrete material, accelerating their growth. The rapid growth of the planetesimals via pebble accretion allows for the formation of giant planet cores in the outer Solar System before the dispersal of the gas disk. A reduction in the size of pebbles as they lose water ice after crossing the ice line and a declining density of gas with distance from the Sun slow the rates of pebble accretion in the inner Solar System resulting in smaller terrestrial planets, a small mass of Mars and a low mass asteroid belt.

== Description ==
In a protoplanetary disk, the probability of accretion of pebbles ranging in size from centimeters to a meter is ≤10% on planets up to about 20 Earth masses. A protoplanetary disk is made up of a mix of gas and solids including dust, pebbles, planetesimals, and protoplanets. Gas in a protoplanetary disk is pressure supported and as a result orbits at a velocity slower than large objects. The gas affects the motions of the solids in varying ways depending on their size, with dust moving with the gas and the largest planetesimals orbiting largely unaffected by the gas. Pebbles are an intermediate case, aerodynamic drag causes them to settle toward the central plane of the disk and to orbit at a sub-Keplerian velocity resulting in radial drift toward the central star. The pebbles frequently encounter planetesimals as a result of their lower velocities and inward drift. If their motions were unaffected by the gas only a small fraction, determined by gravitational focusing and the cross-section of the planetesimals, would be accreted by the planetesimals.

The remainder would follow hyperbolic paths, accelerating toward the planetesimal on their approach and decelerating as they recede. However, the drag the pebbles experience grows as their velocities increase, slowing some enough that they become gravitationally bound to the planetesimal. These pebbles continue to lose energy as they orbit the planetesimal causing them to spiral toward and be accreted by the planetesimal.

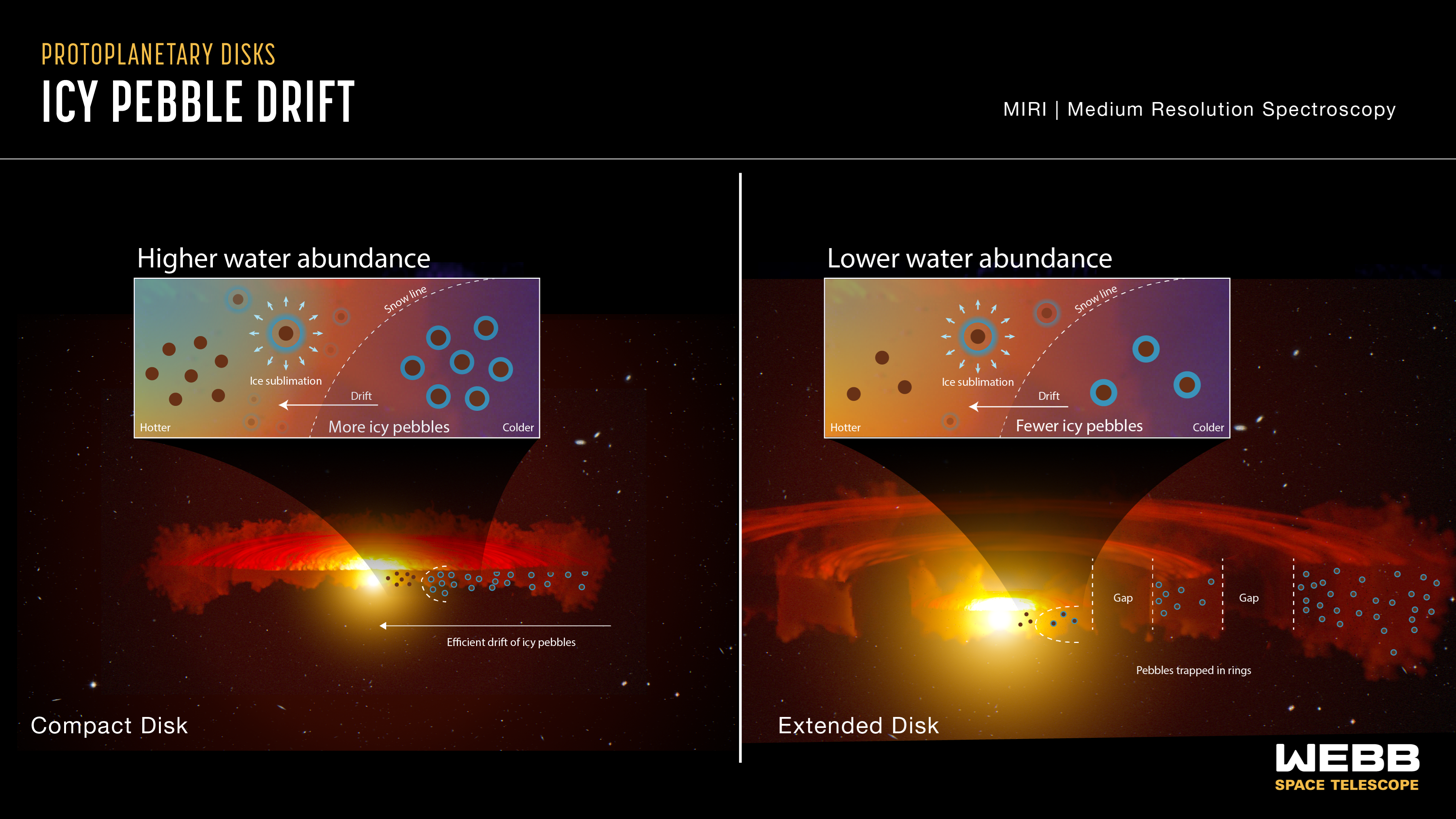
Illustration of icy pebbles delivering water to the rocky planet-forming region in protoplanetary disks, based on results from the James Webb Space Telescope

Small planetesimals accrete pebbles that are drifting past them at the relative velocity of the gas. Those pebbles with stopping times similar to the planetesimal's Bondi time are accreted from within its Bondi radius. In this context the Bondi radius is defined as the distance at which an object approaching a planetesimal at the relative velocity of the gas is deflected by one radian; the stopping time is the exponential timescale for the deceleration of an object due to gas drag, and the Bondi time is the time required for an object to cross the Bondi radius. Since the Bondi radius and Bondi time increase with the size of the planetesimal, and the stopping time increases with the size of the pebble, the optimal pebble size increases with the size of the planetesimal.

Smaller objects, with ratios of stopping times to Bondi times less than 0.1, are pulled from the flow past the planetesimal and accreted from a smaller radius which declines with the square root of this ratio. Larger, weakly coupled pebbles are also accreted less efficiently due to three body effects with the radius accreted from declining rapidly between ratios of 10 and 100. The Bondi radius is proportional to the mass of the planetesimal so the relative growth rate is proportional to mass squared resulting in runaway growth. The aerodynamic deflection of the gas around the planetesimal reduces the efficiency of pebble accretion resulting in a maximum growth timescale of 100 km.

Larger planetesimals, above a transition mass of roughly Ceres mass in the inner Solar System and Pluto mass in the outer Solar System, accrete pebbles with Stokes numbers near one from their Hill radii. The "Stokes number" in this context is the product of stopping time and the Keplerian frequency. As with small planetesimals the radius from which pebbles accrete declines for smaller and larger pebble sizes. The optimal pebble size for large planetesimals measures in cm's due to a combination of the accretion radius and the radial drift rates of the pebbles. As objects grow their accretion changes from 3-D, with accretion from part of the thickness of the pebble disk, to 2D with accretion from full thickness of pebble disk. The relative growth rate in 2-D accretion is proportional to the mass$^{2/3}$ leading to oligarchical growth and the formation of similar sized bodies. Pebble accretion can result in doubling of mass of an Earth-massed core in as little as 5500 years, reducing the timescales for growth of the cores of giant planets by 2 or 3 orders of magnitude relative to planetesimal accretion. The gravitational influence of these massive bodies can create a partial gap in the gas disk altering the pressure gradient. The velocity of gas then becomes super-keplerian outside the gap stopping the inward drift of pebbles and ending pebble accretion. Detailed simulations, based on first-principle calculations, indicate that in typical protoplanetary disks the formation time of giant planets via pebble accretion is a few to several million years, comparable to that obtained from planetesimal accretion calculations.

== Outer Solar System ==
If the formation of pebbles is slow, pebble accretion leads to the formation of a few giant planets in the outer Solar System. The formation of the gas giants is a long-standing problem in planetary science. The accretion of the cores of giant planets via the collision and mergers of planetesimals is slow and may be difficult to complete before the gas disk dissipates. Nonetheless, formation via planetesimal collisions can be accomplished within the typical lifetime of a protoplanetary disc. The largest planetesimals can grow much faster via pebble accretion, but if the formation or delivery of pebbles is rapid numerous Earth-mass planets form instead of a few giant planet cores. As the largest objects approach Earth-mass the radius from which pebbles are accreted is limited by the Hill radius. This slows their growth relative to their neighbors and allows many objects to accrete similar masses of pebbles.

However, if the formation or the delivery of pebbles is slow growth timescales becomes longer than the time required for gravitationally stirring. The largest planetesimals then excite the inclinations and eccentricities of the smaller planetesimals. Their inclined orbits keep small planetesimals outside of the narrow disk of pebbles during most of their orbits, limiting their growth. The period of runaway growth is then extended and the largest objects are able to accrete a sizable fraction of the pebbles and grow into giant planet cores. As the cores grow larger some reach masses sufficient to create partial gaps in the gas disk, altering its pressure gradient and blocking the inward drift of pebbles. Accretion of pebbles is then halted and the gas envelope surrounding the core cools and collapses allowing for the rapid accretion of gas and the formation of a gas giant. Cores that do not grow massive enough to clear gaps in the pebble disk are only able to accrete small gas envelopes and instead become ice giants. The rapid growth via pebble accretion allows the cores to grow large enough to accrete massive gas envelopes forming gas giants while avoiding migrating very close to the star. In simulations, cold gas giants like Jupiter and Saturn can form via pebble accretion if their initial embryos began growing beyond 20 AU. This distant formation offers a potential explanation for Jupiter's enrichment in noble gases. However, dedicated formation models indicate that it is difficult to reconcile growth via pebble accretion with the final mass and composition of the Solar System ice giants Uranus and Neptune.

== Inner Solar System ==
The terrestrial planets may be much smaller than the giant planets due to the sublimation of water ice as pebbles crossed the ice line. The radial drift of pebbles brings them across the ice line where water ice sublimates releasing silicate grains. The silicate grains are less sticky than icy grains resulting in bouncing, or fragmentation during collisions and the formation of smaller pebbles. These smaller pebbles are dispersed into a thicker disk by the turbulence in the gas disk. The mass flow of solids drifting through the terrestrial region is also reduced by half by the loss of water ice. In combination, these two factors significantly reduce the rate at which mass is accreted by planetesimals in the inner Solar System relative to the outer Solar System. As a result, lunar mass planetary embryos in the inner Solar System are able to grow only to around Mars-mass, whereas in the outer Solar System they are able to grow to more than 10x Earth-mass forming the cores of giant planets. Beginning instead with planetesimals formed via streaming instabilities yields similar results in the inner Solar System. In the asteroid belt, the largest planetesimals grow into Mars-massed embryos. These embryos stir the smaller planetesimals, increasing their inclinations, causing them to leave the pebble disk. The growth of these smaller planetesimals is stalled at this point, freezing their size distribution near that of the current asteroid belt. The variation of accretion efficiency with pebble size during this process results in the size sorting of the chondrules observed in the primitive meteorites.

In the terrestrial zone, pebble accretion plays a smaller role. Here, growth is due to a mix of pebble and planetesimal accretion until an oligarchical configuration of isolated lunar-massed embryos forms. Continued growth due to the accretion of inward drifting chondrules increases the mass of these embryos until their orbits are destabilized, leading to giant impacts between the embryos and the formation of Mars-sized embryos. The cutoff of the inward drift of icy pebbles by the formation of Jupiter before the ice line moved into the terrestrial region would limit the water fraction of the planets formed from these embryos.

The small mass of Mars and the low mass asteroid belt may be the result of pebble accretion becoming less efficient as the density of gas in the protoplanetary disk decreases. The protoplanetary disk from which the Solar System formed is thought to have had a surface density that decreased with distance from the Sun and have been flared, with an increasing thickness with distance from the Sun. As a result, the density of the gas and the aerodynamic drag felt by pebbles embedded in the disk would have decreased significantly with distance. If the pebbles were large the efficiency of pebble accretion would decline with distance from the Sun as the aerodynamic drag becomes too weak for the pebbles to be captured during encounters with the largest objects. An object that grows rapidly at Earth's orbital distance would only grow slowly in Mars's orbit and very little in the asteroid belt. The formation of Jupiter's core could also reduce the mass of the asteroid belt by creating a gap in the pebble disk and halting the inward drift of pebbles from beyond the ice line. Objects in the asteroid belt would then be deprived of pebbles early while objects in the terrestrial region continued to accrete pebbles that drifted in from the asteroid region.
