= Small Innovative Missions for Planetary Exploration =

NASA program

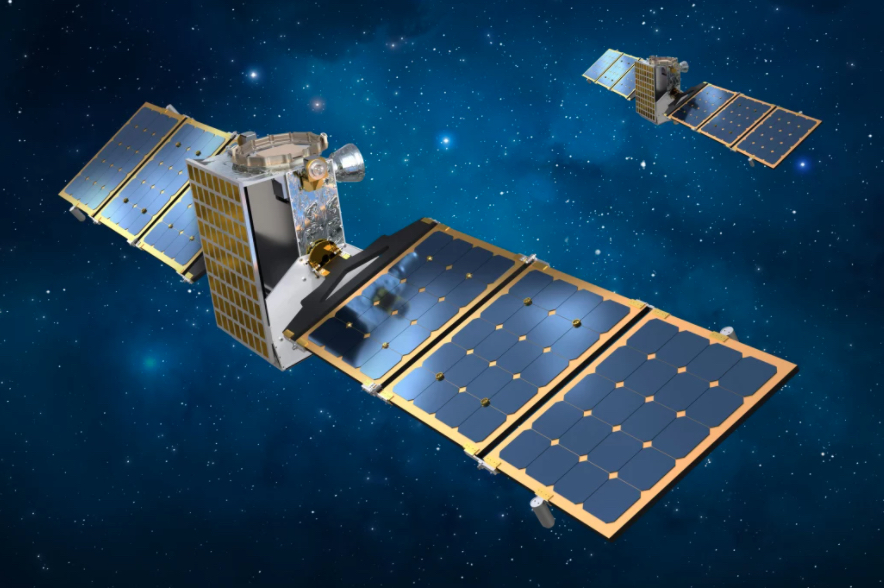
Janus spacecraft, an indefinitely postponed SIMPLEx mission

Small Innovative Missions for Planetary Exploration (SIMPLEx) is a planetary exploration program operated by NASA. The program funds small, low-cost spacecraft for stand-alone planetary exploration missions. These spacecraft are intended to launch as secondary payloads on other missions and are riskier than Discovery or New Frontiers missions.

The program selects missions from multiple proposals and gives them some money to begin development. After early development they are analyzed to see if they are cost-effective and scientifically valuable during Key Decision Point-C. If they pass Key Decision Point-C, then they will move into full development. The missions must weigh less than 180 kg.

As of November 2025, three missions have launched and failed, one successfully launched and is enroute, and one has been postponed indefinitely.

== Missions ==
On August 8, 2015, the first two SIMPLEx missions were selected: Q-PACE and LunaH-Map. They were both CubeSats and each had a maximum budget of $5.6 million. Q-PACE launched on a Virgin Orbit LauncherOne as part of the ELaNa 20 mission. LunaH-Map was a 6U CubeSat that was intended to map hydrogen on the Moon, but failed to enter lunar orbit. The mission launched as a secondary payload on Artemis I.

Three SIMPLEx-2 missions were selected in 2019. Janus was going to launch with Psyche and fly past multiple binary asteroid, but was removed from that mission due to the Psyche spacecraft being delayed. Lunar Trailblazer launched with the IM-2 mission to study the Moon's geology and map its water. EscaPADE will send two small satellites to Mars to study its magnetosphere.

So far, three missions in the SIMPLEx program have failed, one is postponed with no new launch date, and one is en route.

SIMPLEx missions
Name	Selection	Target	Launching with	Launch date	Status
Q-PACE	SIMPLEx-1	Early protoplanetary disks	ELaNa Rideshare	17 January 2021	Failure
LunaH-Map	SIMPLEx-1	Moon	Artemis I	16 November 2022	Failure
Janus	SIMPLEx-2	Binary asteroids	TBD	TBD	Postponed, spacecraft in storage
Lunar Trailblazer	SIMPLEx-2	Moon	IM-2	27 February 2025	Failure
EscaPADE	SIMPLEx-2	Mars	New Glenn	13 November 2025	Enroute

=== Q-PACE ===
Q-PACE is a 3U CubeSat that would have studied the interactions of small particles in space in order to better understand early protoplanetary disks. The mission launched on January 17, 2021 on Virgin Orbit's LauncherOne as part of NASA's ELaNa program. Contact was never established with the CubeSat.

=== LunaH-Map ===
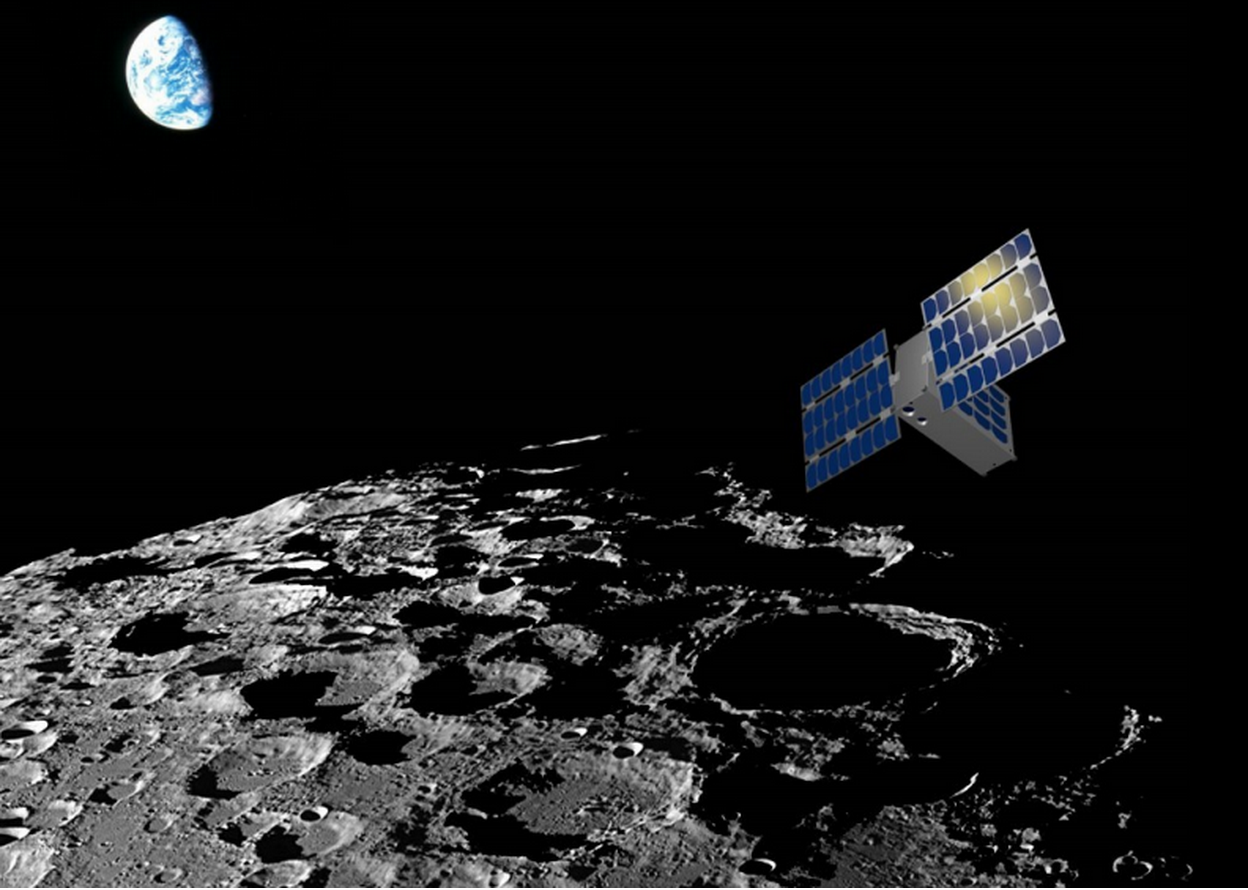
LunaH-Map artistic rendering

LunaH-Map (Lunar Polar Hydrogen Mapper) is a 6U CubeSat that was to map Hydrogen on the Moon using a neutron spectrometer. This mission launched as one of ten secondary payloads on Artemis I. The mission was designed, built, and tested by Arizona State University. It would have taken over a year for LunaH-Map to reach its science orbit, after which its 60-day science mission would begin. However, after it launched, the spacecraft’s propulsion system did not work properly, and it failed to enter lunar orbit. It did succeed in testing its neutron spectrometer.

=== Janus ===
Janus will send two small spacecraft to explore binary asteroids. The two spacecraft were scheduled to launch with Psyche on a Falcon Heavy rocket. The two identical spacecraft (Janus A and B) are being built by Lockheed Martin and are powered by solar panels and rechargeable batteries. The originally intended launch date for Psyche was August 1, 2022, but when that date was delayed to September 20, NASA had to replan the trajectories for the Janus spacecraft. The Psyche launch was then moved to October 2023, but this new launch date will not allow Janus to complete its mission, so Janus was removed from the Psyche launch plan.

=== Lunar Trailblazer ===
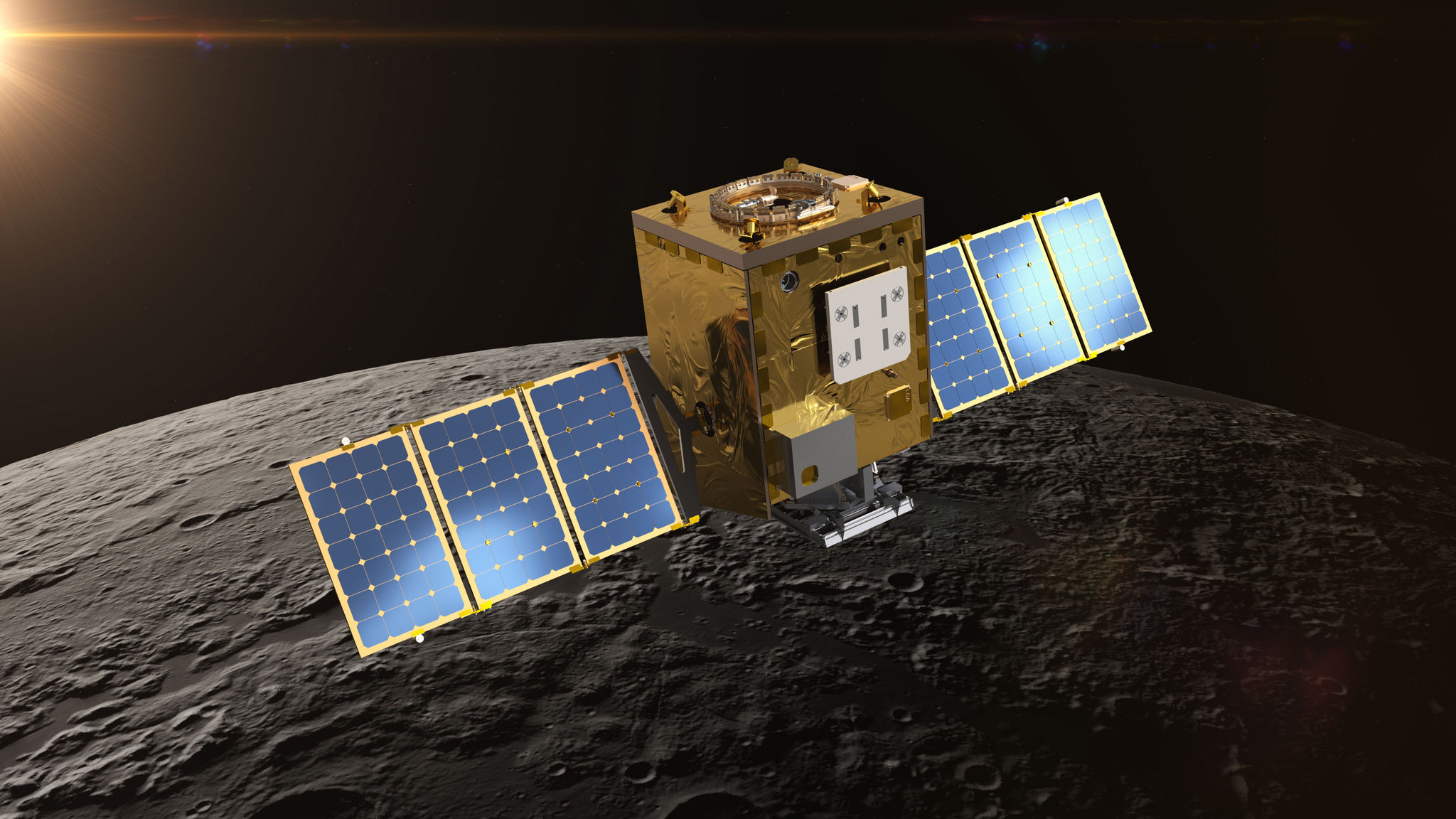
Lunar Trailblazer artistic rendering

The Lunar Trailblazer orbiter's mission was to study water ice on the Moon and determine how it formed, how common it is, and where it is. The small spacecraft should have been capable of looking inside permanently shadowed craters for water ice. The mission was managed by NASA's Jet Propulsion Laboratory. The spacecraft was scheduled to be completed in 2022 and was launched on 27 February 2025 as a secondary payload on IM-2, Intuitive Machines' second lunar landing. The original plan was to launch Lunar Trailblazer as a secondary payload with the IMAP mission in 2025, but since the spacecraft would have been ready years before it was scheduled to launch, NASA found an earlier launch opportunity.

Soon after launch, NASA lost contact with the spacecraft.

=== EscaPADE ===
EscaPADE (Escape and Plasma Acceleration and Dynamics Explorers) are two identical spacecraft en route to Mars. The spacecraft has been built by Rocket Lab and is based on its Photon spacecraft bus. EscaPADE will study Mars' magnetosphere and how it has led to Mars losing much of its atmosphere. The mission was originally going to launch with Janus and Psyche, but was removed from the Psyche launch manifest in 2020. On February 9, 2023, NASA announced that Blue Origin's New Glenn rocket would launch EscaPADE in late 2024. It would’ve been put on a trajectory to arrive at Mars eleven months later. It was listed as the only payload instead of being co-manifested with something. The launch was later delayed to spring 2025 on account of delays with New Glenn. It was postponed several times after that before launching on November 13, 2025.

== See also ==
- Discovery Program
- Explorers program
