= Streaming instability =

Hypothetical formation of planetesimals

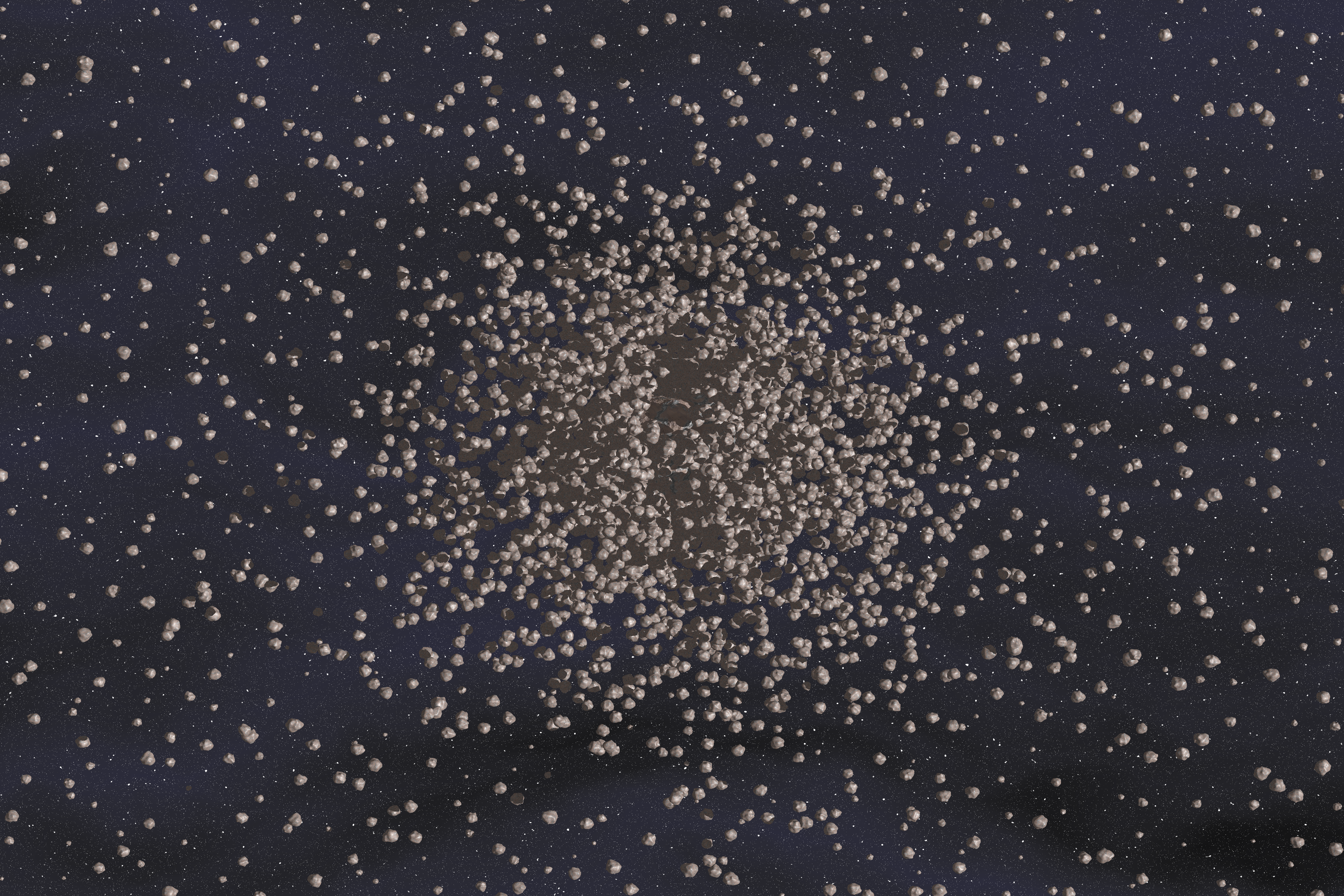
Formation of planetesimals

In planetary science a streaming instability is a hypothetical mechanism for the formation of planetesimals in which the drag felt by solid particles orbiting in a gas disk leads to their spontaneous concentration into clumps which can gravitationally collapse. Small initial clumps increase the orbital velocity of the gas, slowing radial drift locally, leading to their growth as they are joined by faster drifting isolated particles. Massive filaments form that reach densities sufficient for the gravitational collapse into planetesimals the size of large asteroids, bypassing a number of barriers to the traditional formation mechanisms. The formation of streaming instabilities requires solids that are moderately coupled to the gas and a local solid to gas ratio of one or greater. The growth of solids large enough to become moderately coupled to the gas is more likely outside the ice line and in regions with limited turbulence. An initial concentration of solids with respect to the gas is necessary to suppress turbulence sufficiently to allow the solid to gas ratio to reach greater than one at the mid-plane. A wide variety of mechanisms to selectively remove gas or to concentrate solids have been proposed. In the inner Solar System the formation of streaming instabilities requires a greater initial concentration of solids or the growth of solid beyond the size of chondrules.

== Background ==
Planetesimals and larger bodies are traditionally thought to have formed via a hierarchical accretion, the formation of large objects via the collision and mergers of small objects. This process begins with the collision of dust due to Brownian motion producing larger aggregates held together by van der Waals forces. The aggregates settle toward the mid-plane of the disk and collide due to gas turbulence forming pebbles and larger objects. Further collisions and mergers eventually yield planetesimals 1–10 km in diameter held together by self-gravity. The growth of the largest planetesimals then accelerates, as gravitational focusing increases their effective cross-section, resulting in runaway accretion forming the larger asteroids. Later, gravitational scattering by the larger objects excites relative motions, causing a transition to slower oligarchic accretion that ends with the formation of planetary embryos. In the outer Solar System the planetary embryos grow large enough to accrete gas, forming the giant planets. In the inner Solar System the orbits of the planetary embryos become unstable, leading to giant impacts and the formation of the terrestrial planets.

A number of obstacles to this process have been identified: barriers to growth via collisions, the radial drift of larger solids, and the turbulent stirring of planetesimals. As a particle grows the time required for its motion to react to changes in the motion of the gas in turbulent eddies increases. The relative motions of particles, and collision velocities, therefore increases as with the mass of the particles. For silicates the increased collision velocities cause dust aggregates to compact into solid particles that bounce rather than stick, ending growth at the size of chondrules, roughly 1 mm in diameter. Icy solids may not be affected by the bouncing barrier but their growth can be halted at larger sizes due to fragmentation as collision velocities increase. Radial drift is the result of the pressure support of the gas, enabling it to orbit at a slower velocity than the solids. Solids orbiting through this gas lose angular momentum and spiral toward the central star at rates that increase as they grow. At 1 AU this produces a meter-sized barrier, with the rapid loss of large objects in as little as ~1000 orbits, ending with their vaporization as they approach too close to the star. At greater distances the growth of icy bodies can become drift limited at smaller sizes when their drift timescales become shorter than their growth timescales. Turbulence in the protoplanetary disk can create density fluctuations which exert torques on planetesimals exciting their relative velocities. Outside the dead zone the higher random velocities can result in the destruction of smaller planetesimals, and the delay of the onset of runaway growth until planetesimals reach radii of 100 km.

Some evidence exists that planetesimal formation may have bypassed these barriers to incremental growth. In the inner asteroid belt all of the low albedo asteroids that have not been identified as part of a collisional family are larger than 35 km. A change in the slope of the size distribution of asteroids at roughly 100 km can be reproduced in models if the minimal diameter of the planetesimals was 100 km and the smaller asteroids are debris from collisions. A similar change in slope has been observed in the size distribution of the Kuiper belt objects. The low numbers of small craters on Pluto has also been cited as evidence the largest KBO's formed directly. Furthermore, if the cold classical KBO's formed in situ from a low mass disk, as suggested by the presence of loosely bound binaries, they are unlikely to have formed via the traditional mechanism. The dust activity of comets indicates a low tensile strength that would be the result of a gentle formation process with collisions at free-fall velocities.

== Description ==
Streaming instabilities, first described by Andrew Youdin and Jeremy Goodman, are driven by differences in the motions of the gas and solid particles in the protoplanetary disk. The gas is hotter and denser closer to the star, creating a pressure gradient that partially offsets gravity from the star. The partial support of the pressure gradient allows the gas to orbit at roughly 50 m/s below the Keplerian velocity at its distance. The solid particles, however, are not supported by the pressure gradient and would orbit at Keplerian velocities in the absence of the gas. The difference in velocities results in a headwind that causes the solid particles to spiral toward the central star as they lose momentum to aerodynamic drag. The drag also produces a back reaction on the gas, increasing its velocity. When solid particles cluster in the gas, the reaction reduces the headwind locally, allowing the cluster to orbit faster and undergo less inward drift. The slower drifting clusters are overtaken and joined by isolated particles, increasing the local density and further reducing radial drift, fueling an exponential growth of the initial clusters. In simulations the clusters form massive filaments that can grow or dissipate, and that can collide and merge or split into multiple filaments. The separation of filaments averages 0.2 gas scale heights, roughly 0.02 AU at the distance of the asteroid belt. The densities of the filaments can exceed a thousand times the gas density, sufficient to trigger the gravitational collapse and fragmentation of the filaments into bound clusters.

The clusters shrink as energy is dissipated by gas drag and inelastic collisions, leading to the formation of planetesimals the size of large asteroids. Impact speeds are limited during the collapse of the smaller clusters that form 1–10 km asteroids, reducing the fragmentation of particles, leading to the formation of porous pebble pile planetesimals with low densities. Gas drag slows the fall of the smallest particles and less frequent collisions slows the fall of the largest particles during this process, resulting in the size sorting of particles with mid-sized particles forming a porous core and a mix of particle sizes forming denser outer layers. The impact speeds and the fragmentation of particles increase with the mass of the clusters, lowering the porosity and increasing the density of the larger objects such as 100 km asteroid that form from a mixture of pebbles and pebble fragments. Collapsing swarms with excess angular momentum can fragment, forming binary or in some cases trinary objects resembling those in the Kuiper belt. In simulations the initial mass distribution of the planetesimals formed via streaming instabilities fits a power law: dn/dM ~ M^{−1.6}, that is slightly steeper than that of small asteroids, with an exponential cutoff at larger masses. Continued accretion of chondrules from the disk may shift the size distribution of the largest objects toward that of the current asteroid belt. In the outer Solar System the largest objects can continue to grow via pebble accretion, possibly forming the cores of giant planets.

== Requirements ==
Streaming instabilities form only in the presence of rotation and the radial drift of solids. The initial linear phase of a streaming instability, begins with a transient region of high pressure within the protoplanetary disk. The elevated pressure alters the local pressure gradient supporting the gas, reducing the gradient on the region's inner edge and increasing the gradient on the region's outer edge. The gas therefore must orbit faster near the inner edge and is able to orbit slower near the outer edge. The Coriolis forces resulting from these relative motions support the elevated pressure, creating a geostropic balance. The motions of the solids near the high pressure regions are also affected: solids at its outer edge face a greater headwind and undergo faster radial drift, solids at its inner edge face a lesser headwind and undergo a slower radial drift. This differential radial drift produces a buildup of solids in higher pressure regions. The drag felt by the solids moving toward the region also creates a back reaction on the gas that reinforces the elevated pressure leading to a runaway process. As more solids are carried toward the region by radial drift this eventually yields a concentration of solids sufficient to drive the increase of the velocity of the gas and reduce the local radial drift of solids seen in streaming instabilities.

Streaming instabilities form when the solid particles are moderately coupled to the gas, with Stokes numbers of 0.01 - 3; the local solid to gas ratio is near or larger than 1; and the vertically integrated solid to gas ratio is a few times Solar. The Stokes number is a measure of the relative influences of inertia and gas drag on a particle's motion. In this context it is the product of the timescale for the exponential decay of a particle's velocity due to drag and the angular frequency of its orbit. Small particles like dust are strongly coupled and move with the gas, large bodies such as planetesimals are weakly coupled and orbit largely unaffected by the gas. Moderately coupled solids, sometimes referred to as pebbles, range from roughly cm- to m-sized at asteroid belt distances and from mm- to dm-sized beyond 10 AU. These objects orbit through the gas like planetesimals but are slowed due to the headwind and undergo significant radial drift. The moderately coupled solids that participate in streaming instabilities are those dynamically affected by changes in the motions of gas on scales similar to those of the Coriolis effect, allowing them to be captured by regions of high pressure in a rotating disk. Moderately coupled solids also retain influence on the motion of the gas. If the local solid to gas ratio is near or above 1, this influence is strong enough to reinforce regions of high pressure and to increase the orbital velocity of the gas and slow radial drift. Reaching and maintaining this local solid to gas at the mid-plane requires an average solid to gas ratio in a vertical cross section of the disk that is a few times solar. When the average solid to gas ratio is 0.01, roughly that estimated from measurements of the current Solar System, turbulence at the mid-plane generates a wavelike pattern that puffs up the mid-plane layer of solids. This reduces the solid to gas ratio at the mid-plane to less than 1, suppressing the formation of dense clumps. At higher average solid to gas ratios the mass of solids dampens this turbulence allowing a thin mid-plane layer to form. Stars with higher metallicities are more likely to reach the minimum solid to gas ratio making them favorable locations for planetesimal and planet formation.

A high average solid to gas ratio may be reached due to the loss of gas or by the concentration of solids. Gas may be selectively lost due to photoevaporation late in the gas disk epoch, causing solids to be concentrated in a ring at the edge of a cavity that forms in the gas disk, though the mass of planetesimals that forms may be too small to produce planets. The solid to gas ratio can also increase in the outer disk due to photoevaporation, but in the giant planet region the resulting planetesimal formation may be too late to produce giant planets. If the magnetic field of the disc is aligned with its angular momentum the Hall effect increases viscosity which can result in a faster depletion of the inner gas disk. A pile up of solids in the inner disk can occur due to slower rates of radial drift as Stokes numbers decline with increasing gas densities. This radial pile up is reinforced as the velocity of the gas increases with the surface density of solids and could result in the formation of bands of planetesimals extending from sublimation lines to a sharp outer edges where solid to gas ratios first reach critical values. For some ranges of particle size and gas viscosity outward flow of the gas may occur, reducing its density and further increasing the solid to gas ratio. The radial pile ups may be limited due to a reduction in the gas density as the disk evolves however, and shorter growth timescales of solids closer to the star could instead result in the loss of solids from the inside out. Radial pile-ups also occur at locations where rapidly drifting large solids fragment into smaller slower drifting solids, for example, inside the ice line where silicate grains are released as icy bodies sublimate. This pile up can also increase the local velocity of the gas, extending the pile up to outside the ice line where it is enhanced by the outward diffusion and recondensation of water vapor. The pile-up could be muted, however, if the icy bodies are highly porous, which slows their radial drift. Icy solids can be concentrated outside the ice line due to the outward diffusion and recondensation of water vapor. Solids are also concentrated in radial pressure bumps, where the pressure reaches a local maximum. At these locations radial drift converges from both closer and farther from the star. Radial pressure bumps are present at the inner edge of the dead zone, and can form due to the magnetorotational instability. Pressure bumps may also be produced due to the back-reaction of dust on the gas creating self-induced dust traps. The ice line has also been proposed as the site of a pressure bump, however, this requires a steep viscosity transition. If the back-reaction from the concentration of solids flattens the pressure gradient, the planetesimals formed at a pressure bump may be smaller than predicted at other locations. If the pressure gradient is maintained streaming instabilities may form at the location of a pressure bump even in viscous disks with significant turbulence. Local pressure bumps also form in the spiral arms of a massive self-gravitating disk and in anti-cyclonic vortices. The break-up of vortices could also leave a ring of solids from which a streaming instability may form. Solids may also be concentrated locally if disk winds lower the surface density of the inner disc, slowing or reversing their inward drift, or due to thermal diffusion.

Streaming instabilities are more likely to form in regions of the disk where: the growth of solids is favored, the pressure gradient is small, and turbulence is low. Inside the ice-line the bouncing barrier may prevent the growth of silicates large enough to take part in streaming instabilities. Beyond the ice line hydrogen bonding allows particles of water ice to stick at higher collision velocities, possibly enabling the growth of large highly porous icy bodies to Stokes numbers approaching 1 before their growth is slowed by erosion. The condensation of vapor diffusing outward from sublimating icy bodies may also drive the growth of compact dm-size icy bodies outside the ice line. A similar growth of bodies due to recondensation of water could occur over a broader region following an FU Orionis event. At greater distances the growth of solids could again be limited if they are coated with a layer of CO_{2} or other ices that reduce the collision velocities where sticking occurs. A small pressure gradient reduces the rate of radial drift, limiting the turbulence generated by streaming instabilities. A smaller average solid to gas ratio is then necessary to suppress turbulence at the mid-plane. The diminished turbulence also enables the growth of larger solids by lowering impact velocities. Hydrodynamic models indicate that the smallest pressure gradients occur near the ice-line and in the inner parts of the disk. The pressure gradient also decreases late in the disk's evolution as the accretion rate and the temperature decline. A major source of turbulence in the protoplanetary disk is the magnetorotational instability. The impacts of turbulence generated by this instability could limit streaming instabilities to the dead zone, estimated to form near the mid-plane at 1-20 AU, where the ionization rate is too low to sustain the magnetorotational instability.

In the inner Solar System the formation of streaming instabilities requires a larger enhancement of the solid to gas ratio than beyond the ice line. The growth of silicate particles is limited by the bouncing barrier to ~1 mm, roughly the size of the chondrules found in meteorites. In the inner Solar System particles this small have Stokes numbers of ~0.001. At these Stokes numbers a vertically integrated solid to gas ratio greater than 0.04, roughly four times that of the overall gas disk, is required to form streaming instabilities. The required concentration may be reduced by half if the particles are able to grow to roughly cm-size. This growth, possibly aided by dusty rims that absorb impacts, may occur over a period of 10^5 years if a fraction of collisions result in sticking due to a broad distribution of collision velocities. Or, if turbulence and the collision velocities are reduced inside initial weak clumps, a runaway process may occur in which clumping aids the growth of solids and their growth strengthens clumping. A radial pile-up of solids may also lead to conditions that support streaming instabilities in a narrow annulus at roughly 1 AU. This would requires a shallow initial disk profile and that the growth of solids be limited by fragmentation instead of bouncing allowing cm-sized solids to form, however. The growth of particles may be further limited at high temperatures, possibly leading to an inner boundary of planetesimal formation where temperatures reaches 1000K.

== Alternatives ==
Instead of actively driving their own concentration, as in streaming instabilities, solids may be passively concentrated to sufficient densities for planetesimals to form via gravitational instabilities. In an early proposal dust settled at the mid-plane until sufficient densities were reached for the disk to gravitationally fragment and collapse into planetesimals. The difference in orbital velocities of the dust and gas, however, produces turbulence which inhibits settling preventing sufficient densities from being reached. If the average dust to gas ratio is increased by an order of magnitude at a pressure bump or by the slower drift of small particles derived from fragmenting larger bodies, this turbulence may be suppressed allowing the formation of planetesimals.

The cold classical Kuiper belt objects may have formed in a low mass disk dominated by cm-sized or smaller objects. In this model the gas disk epoch ends with km-sized objects, possibly formed via gravitational instability, embedded in a disk of small objects. The disk remains dynamically cool due to inelastic collisions among the cm-sized objects. The slow encounter velocities result in efficient growth with a sizable fraction of the mass ending in the large objects. The dynamical friction from the small bodies would also aid in the formation of binaries.

Planetesimals may also be formed from the concentration of chondrules between eddies in a turbulent disk. In this model the particles are split unequally when large eddies fragment increasing the concentrations of some clumps. As this process cascades to smaller eddies a fraction of these clumps may reach densities sufficient to be gravitationally bound and slowly collapse into planetesimals. Recent research, however, indicates that larger objects such as conglomerates of chondrules may be necessary and that the concentrations produced from chondrules may instead act as the seeds of streaming instabilities.

Icy particles are more likely to stick and to resist compression in collisions which may allow the growth of large porous bodies. If the growth of these bodies is fractal, with their porosity increasing as larger porous bodies collide, their radial drift timescales become long, allowing them to grow until they are compressed by gas drag and self-gravity forming small planetesimimals. Alternatively, if the local solid density of the disk is sufficient, they may settle into a thin disk that fragments due to a gravitational instability, forming planetesimals the size of large asteroids, once they grow large enough to become decoupled from the gas. A similar fractal growth of porous silicates may also be possible if they are made up of nanometer-sized grains formed from the evaporation and recondensation of dust. However, the fractal growth of highly porous solids may be limited by the infilling of their cores with small particles generated in collisions due to turbulence; by erosion as the impact velocity due to the relative rates of radial drift of large and small bodies increases; and by sintering as they approach ice lines, reducing their ability to absorb collisions, resulting in bouncing or fragmentation during collisions.

Collisions at velocities that would result in the fragmentation of equal sized particles can instead result in growth via mass transfer from the small to the larger particle. This process requires an initial population of 'lucky' particles that have grown larger than the majority of particles. These particles may form if collision velocities have a wide distribution, with a small fraction occurring at velocities that allow objects beyond the bouncing barrier to stick. However, the growth via mass transfer is slow relative to radial drift timescales, although it may occur locally if radial drift is halted locally at a pressure bump allowing the formation of planetesimals in 10^5 yrs.

Planetesimal accretion could reproduce the size distribution of the asteroids if it began with 100 meter planetesimals. In this model collisional dampening and gas drag dynamically cool the disk and the bend in the size distribution is caused by a transition between growth regimes. This however require a low level of turbulence in the gas and some mechanism for the formation of 100 meter planetesimals. Size dependent clearing of planetesimals due to secular resonance sweeping could also remove small bodies creating a break in the size distribution of asteroids. Secular resonances sweeping inward through the asteroid belt as the gas disk dissipated would excite the eccentricities of the planetesimals. As their eccentricities were damped due to gas drag and tidal interaction with the disk the largest and smallest objects would be lost as their semi-major axes shrank leaving behind the intermediate sized planetesimals.
