= Accretion (astrophysics) =

Accumulation of particles into a massive object by gravitationally attracting more matter

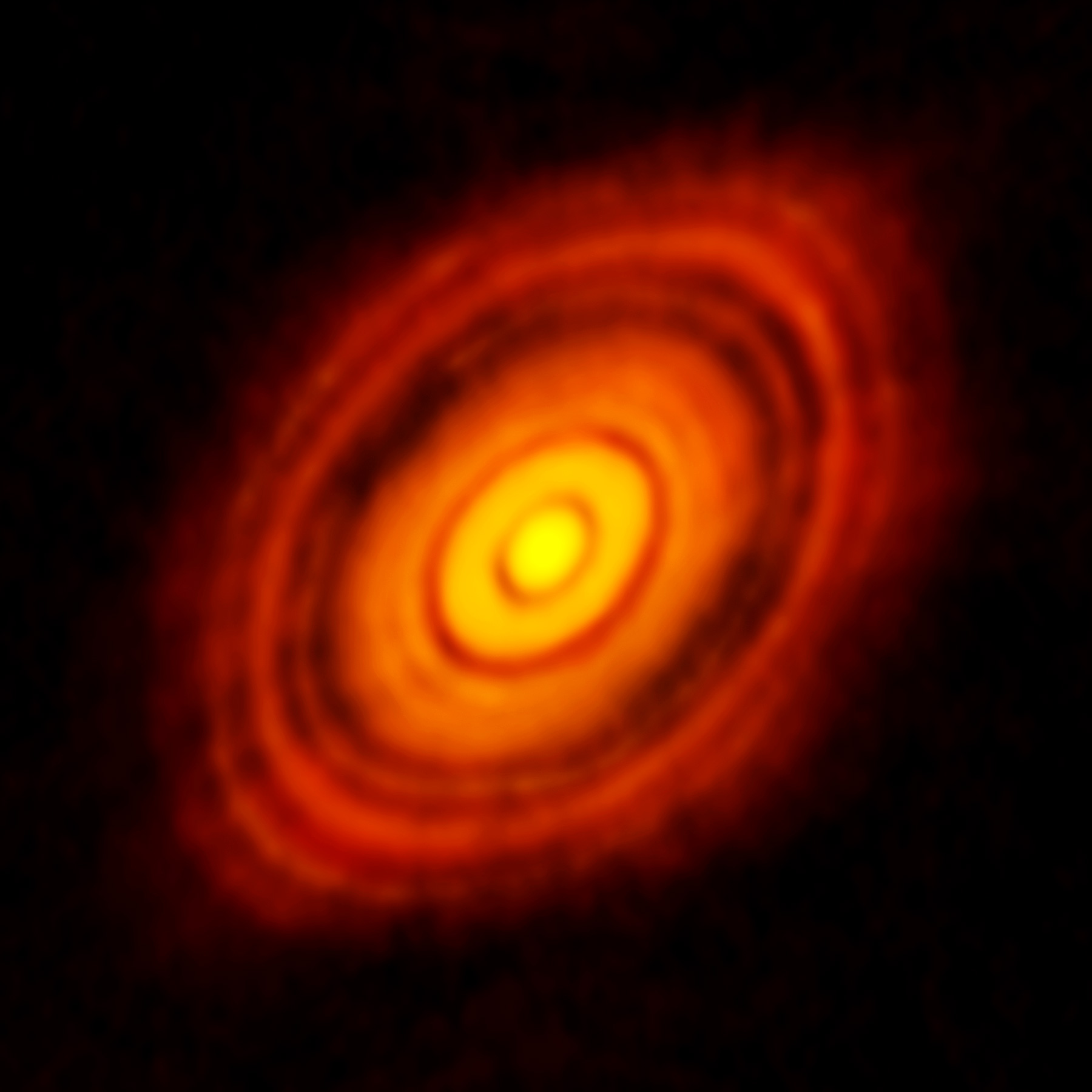
ALMA image of HL Tauri, a protoplanetary disk

In astrophysics, accretion is the accumulation of matter into a massive object by gravitationally attracting more matter. If the matter is gaseous the result is an accretion disc. Accretion of solid matter such as dust will form larger solid objects. Most astronomical objects, such as galaxies, stars, and planets, are formed by accretion processes.

== History ==
The accretion model that Earth and the other terrestrial planets formed from meteoric material was proposed in 1944 by Otto Schmidt, followed by the protoplanet theory of William McCrea (1960) and finally the capture theory of Michael Woolfson. In 1978, Andrew Prentice resurrected the initial Laplacian ideas about planet formation and developed the modern Laplacian theory. None of these models proved completely successful, and many of the proposed theories were descriptive.

The 1944 accretion model by Otto Schmidt was further developed in a quantitative way in 1969 by Viktor Safronov. He calculated, in detail, the different stages of terrestrial planet formation. Since then, the model has been further developed using intensive numerical simulations to study planetesimal accumulation. It is now accepted that stars form by the gravitational collapse of interstellar gas. Prior to collapse, this gas is mostly in the form of molecular clouds, such as the Orion Nebula. As the cloud collapses, losing potential energy, it heats up, gaining kinetic energy, and the conservation of angular momentum ensures that the cloud forms a flattened disk—the accretion disk.

== Accretion of galaxies ==
A few hundred thousand years after the Big Bang, the Universe cooled to the point where atoms could form. As the Universe continued to expand and cool, the atoms lost enough kinetic energy, and dark matter coalesced sufficiently, to form protogalaxies. As further accretion occurred, galaxies formed. Indirect evidence is widespread. Galaxies grow through mergers and smooth gas accretion. Accretion also occurs inside galaxies, forming stars.

== Accretion of stars ==
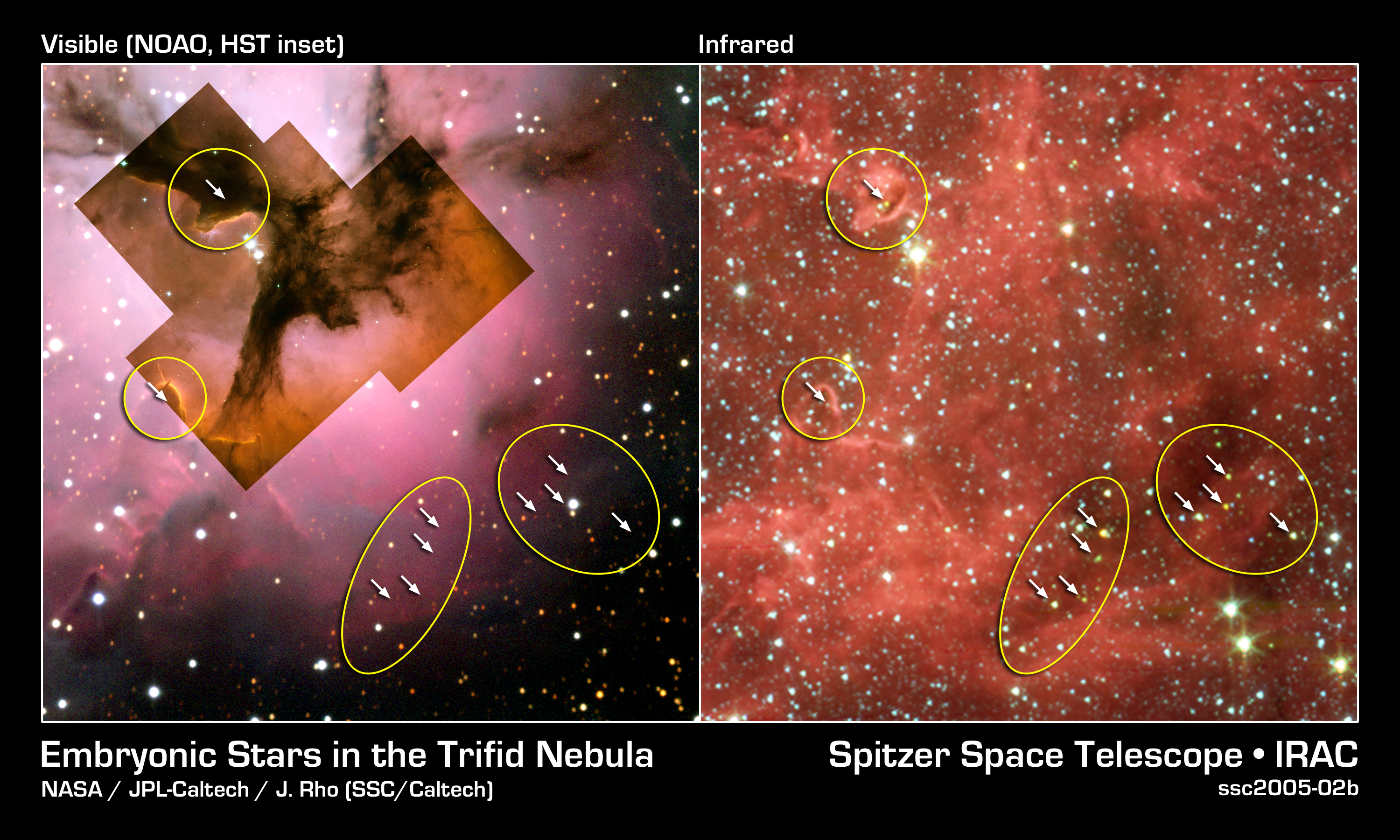
The visible-light (left) and infrared (right) views of the Trifid Nebula, a giant star-forming cloud of gas and dust located 5,400 light-years (1,700 pc) away in the constellation Sagittarius

Stars are thought to form inside giant clouds of cold molecular hydrogen — giant molecular clouds of roughly 300,000 M_{☉} and 65 light-years (20 pc) in diameter. Over millions of years, giant molecular clouds are prone to collapse and fragmentation. These fragments then form small, dense cores, which in turn collapse into stars. The cores range in mass from a fraction to several times that of the Sun and are called protostellar (protosolar) nebulae. They possess diameters of 2,000–20,000 astronomical units (0.01–0.1 pc) and a particle number density of roughly 10,000 to 100,000/cm^{3} (160,000 to 1,600,000/cu in). Compare it with the particle number density of the air at the sea level — 2.8×10^{19}/cm^{3} (4.6×10^{20}/cu in).

The initial collapse of a solar-mass protostellar nebula takes around 100,000 years. Every nebula begins with a certain amount of angular momentum. Gas in the central part of the nebula, with relatively low angular momentum, undergoes fast compression and forms a hot hydrostatic (non-contracting) core containing a small fraction of the mass of the original nebula. This core forms the seed of what will become a star. As the collapse continues, conservation of angular momentum dictates that the rotation of the infalling envelope accelerates, which eventually forms a disk.

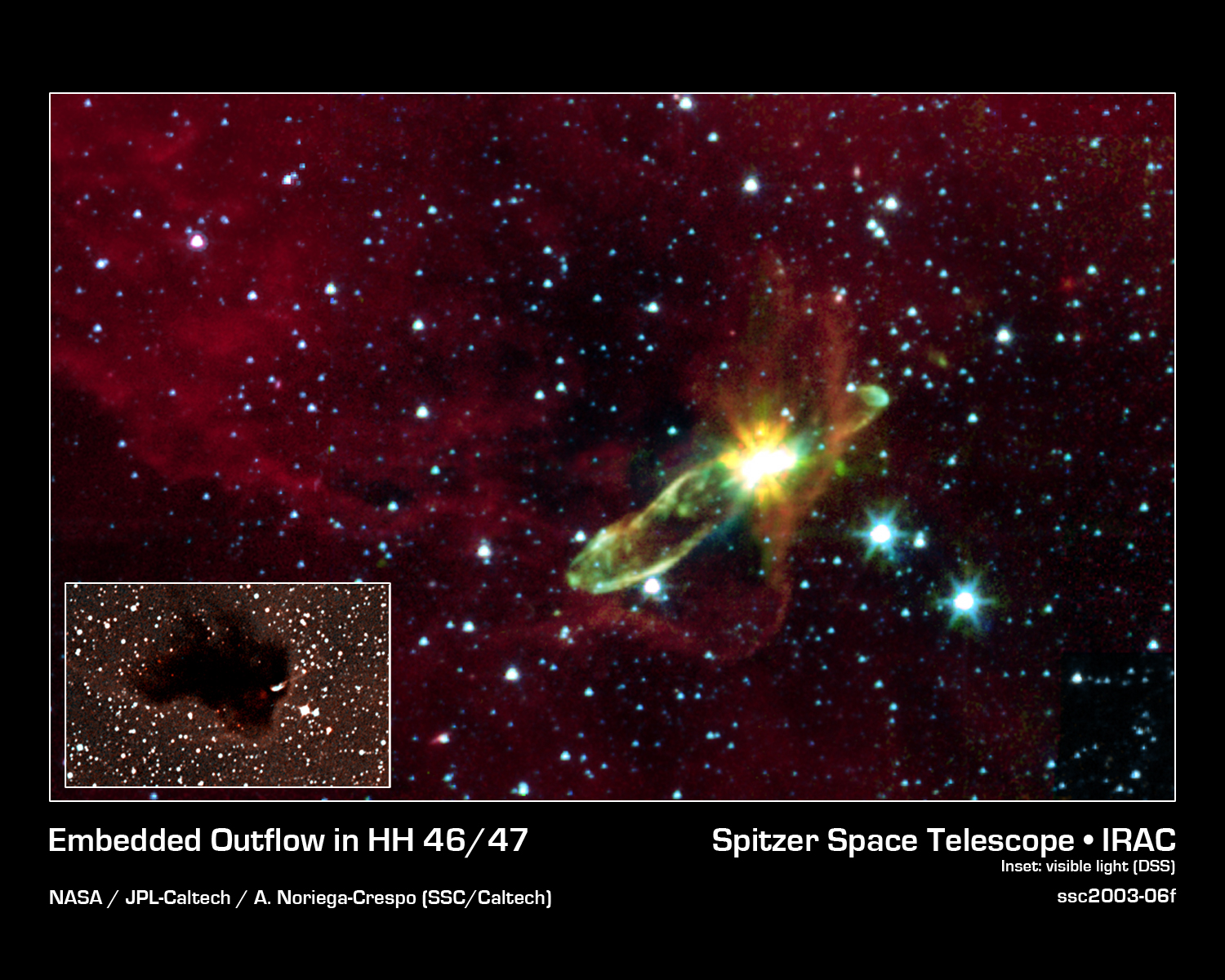
Infrared image of the molecular outflow from an otherwise hidden newborn star HH 46/47

As the infall of material from the disk continues, the envelope eventually becomes thin and transparent and the young stellar object (YSO) becomes observable, initially in far-infrared light and later in the visible. Around this time the protostar begins to fuse deuterium. If the protostar is sufficiently massive (above 80 M_{J}), hydrogen fusion follows. Otherwise, if its mass is too low, the object becomes a brown dwarf. This birth of a new star occurs approximately 100,000 years after the collapse begins. Objects at this stage are known as Class I protostars, which are also called young T Tauri stars, evolved protostars, or young stellar objects. By this time, the forming star has already accreted much of its mass; the total mass of the disk and remaining envelope does not exceed 10–20% of the mass of the central YSO.

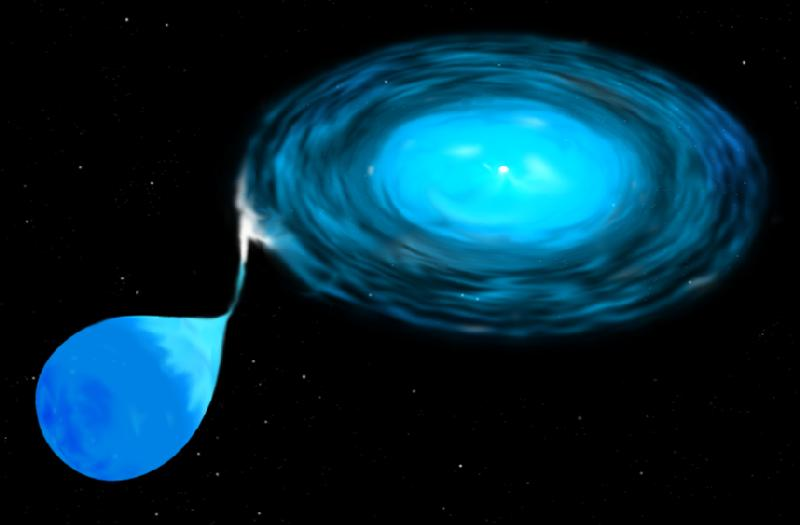
When the lower-mass star in a binary system enters an expansion phase, its outer atmosphere may fall onto the compact star, forming an accretion disk

At the next stage, the envelope completely disappears, having been gathered up by the disk, and the protostar becomes a classical T Tauri star. The latter have accretion disks and continue to accrete hot gas, which manifests itself by strong emission lines in their spectrum. The former do not possess accretion disks. Classical T Tauri stars evolve into weakly lined T Tauri stars. This happens after about 1 million years. The mass of the disk around a classical T Tauri star is about 1–3% of the stellar mass, and it is accreted at a rate of 10^{−7} to 10^{−9} M_{☉} per year. A pair of bipolar jets is usually present as well. The accretion explains all peculiar properties of classical T Tauri stars: strong flux in the emission lines (up to 100% of the intrinsic luminosity of the star), magnetic activity, photometric variability and jets. The emission lines actually form as the accreted gas hits the "surface" of the star, which happens around its magnetic poles. The jets are byproducts of accretion: they carry away excessive angular momentum. The classical T Tauri stage lasts about 10 million years (there are only a few examples of so-called Peter Pan disks, where the accretion continues to persist for much longer periods, sometimes lasting for more than 40 million years). The disk eventually disappears due to accretion onto the central star, planet formation, ejection by jets, and photoevaporation by ultraviolet radiation from the central star and nearby stars. As a result, the young star becomes a weakly lined T Tauri star, which, over hundreds of millions of years, evolves into an ordinary Sun-like star, dependent on its initial mass.

== Accretion of planets ==
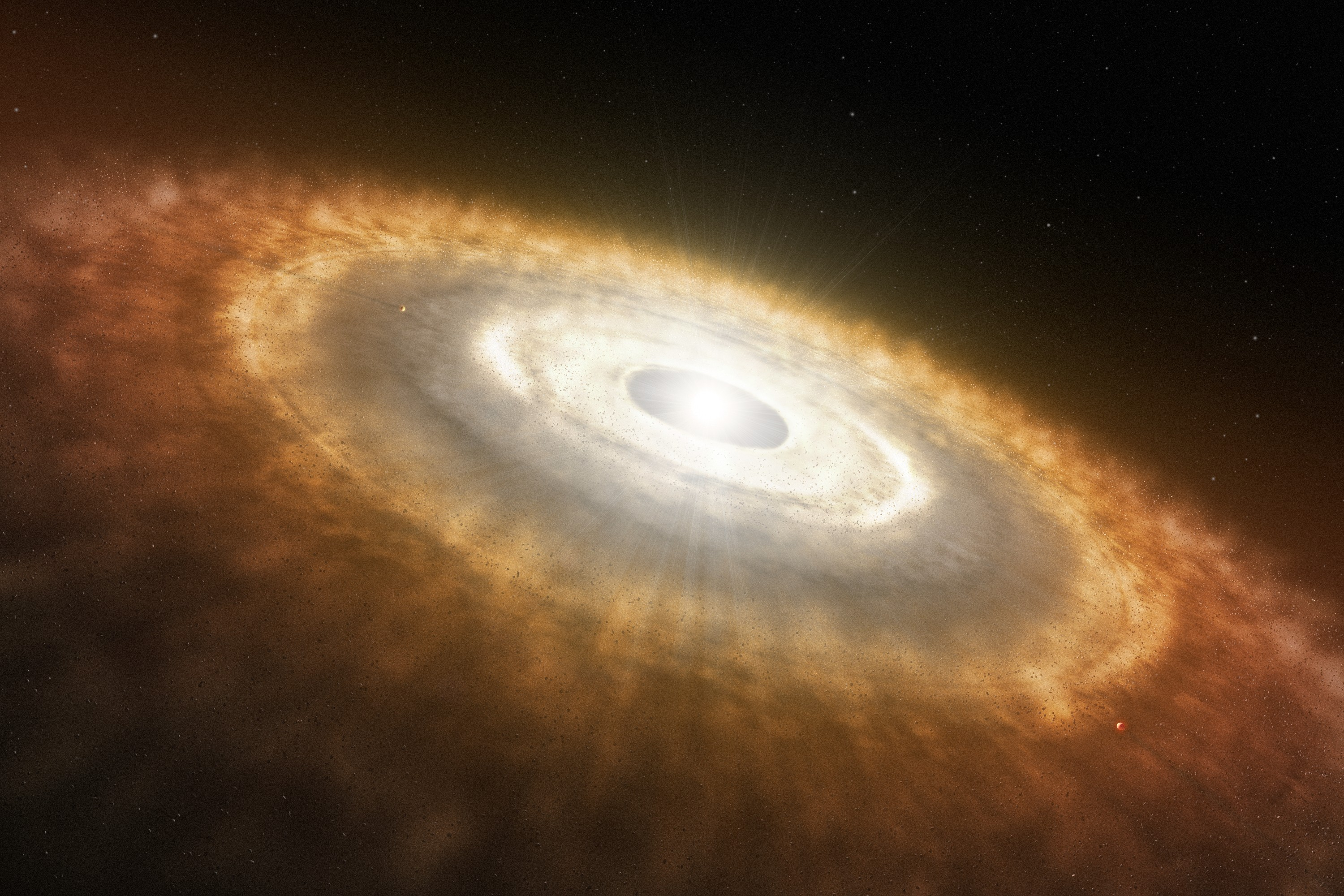
Artist's impression of a protoplanetary disk showing a young star at its center

Self-accretion of cosmic dust accelerates the growth of the particles into boulder-sized planetesimals. The more massive planetesimals accrete some smaller ones, while others shatter in collisions. Accretion disks are common around smaller stars, stellar remnants in a close binary, or black holes surrounded by material (such as those at the centers of galaxies). Some dynamics in the disk, such as dynamical friction, are necessary to allow orbiting gas to lose angular momentum and fall onto the central massive object. Occasionally, this can result in stellar surface fusion (see Bondi accretion).

In the formation of terrestrial planets or planetary cores, several stages can be considered. First, when gas and dust grains collide, they agglomerate by microphysical processes like van der Waals forces and electromagnetic forces, forming micrometer-sized particles. During this stage, accumulation mechanisms are largely non-gravitational in nature. However, planetesimal formation in the centimeter-to-meter range is not well understood, and no convincing explanation is offered as to why such grains would accumulate rather than simply rebound. In particular, it is still not clear how these objects grow to become 0.1–1 km (0.06–0.6 mi) sized planetesimals; this problem is known as the "meter size barrier": As dust particles grow by coagulation, they acquire increasingly large relative velocities with respect to other particles in their vicinity, as well as a systematic inward drift velocity, that leads to destructive collisions, and thereby limit the growth of the aggregates to some maximum size. Ward (1996) suggests that when slow moving grains collide, the very low, yet non-zero, gravity of colliding grains impedes their escape. It is also thought that grain fragmentation plays an important role replenishing small grains and keeping the disk thick, but also in maintaining a relatively high abundance of solids of all sizes.

A number of mechanisms have been proposed for crossing the 'meter-sized' barrier. Local concentrations of pebbles may form, which then gravitationally collapse into planetesimals the size of large asteroids. These concentrations can occur passively due to the structure of the gas disk, for example, between eddies, at pressure bumps, at the edge of a gap created by a giant planet, or at the boundaries of turbulent regions of the disk. Or, the particles may take an active role in their concentration via a feedback mechanism referred to as a streaming instability. In a streaming instability the interaction between the solids and the gas in the protoplanetary disk results in the growth of local concentrations, as new particles accumulate in the wake of small concentrations, causing them to grow into massive filaments. Alternatively, if the grains that form due to the agglomeration of dust are highly porous their growth may continue until they become large enough to collapse due to their own gravity. The low density of these objects allows them to remain strongly coupled with the gas, thereby avoiding high velocity collisions which could result in their erosion or fragmentation.

Grains eventually stick together to form mountain-size (or larger) bodies called planetesimals. Collisions and gravitational interactions between planetesimals combine to produce Moon-size planetary embryos (protoplanets) over roughly 0.1–1 million years. Finally, the planetary embryos collide to form planets over 10–100 million years. The planetesimals are massive enough that mutual gravitational interactions are significant enough to be taken into account when computing their evolution. Growth is aided by orbital decay of smaller bodies due to gas drag, which prevents them from being stranded between orbits of the embryos. Further collisions and accumulation lead to terrestrial planets or the core of giant planets.

If the planetesimals formed via the gravitational collapse of local concentrations of pebbles, their growth into planetary embryos and the cores of giant planets is dominated by the further accretions of pebbles. Pebble accretion is aided by the gas drag felt by objects as they accelerate toward a massive body. Gas drag slows the pebbles below the escape velocity of the massive body causing them to spiral toward and to be accreted by it. Pebble accretion may accelerate the formation of planets by a factor of 1000 compared to the accretion of planetesimals, allowing giant planets to form before the dissipation of the gas disk. However, core growth via pebble accretion appears incompatible with the final masses and compositions of Uranus and Neptune. Direct calculations indicate that, in a typical protoplanetary disk, the formation time of a giant planet via pebble accretion is comparable to the formation times resulting from planetesimal accretion.

The formation of terrestrial planets differs from that of giant gas planets, also called Jovian planets. The particles that make up the terrestrial planets are made from metal and rock that condensed in the inner Solar System. However, Jovian planets began as large, icy planetesimals, which then captured hydrogen and helium gas from the solar nebula. Differentiation between these two classes of planetesimals arises due to the frost line of the solar nebula.

== Accretion of asteroids ==
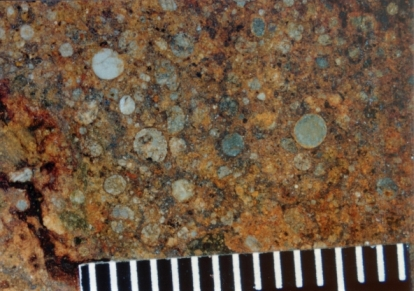
Chondrules in a chondrite meteorite. A millimeter scale is shown.

Meteorites contain a record of accretion and impacts during all stages of asteroid origin and evolution; however, the mechanism of asteroid accretion and growth is not well understood. Evidence suggests the main growth of asteroids can result from gas-assisted accretion of chondrules, which are millimeter-sized spherules that form as molten (or partially molten) droplets in space before being accreted to their parent asteroids. In the inner Solar System, chondrules appear to have been crucial for initiating accretion. The tiny mass of asteroids may be partly due to inefficient chondrule formation beyond 2 AU, or less-efficient delivery of chondrules from near the protostar. Also, impacts controlled the formation and destruction of asteroids, and are thought to be a major factor in their geological evolution.

Chondrules, metal grains, and other components likely formed in the solar nebula. These accreted together to form parent asteroids. Some of these bodies subsequently melted, forming metallic cores and olivine-rich mantles; others were aqueously altered. After the asteroids had cooled, they were eroded by impacts for 4.5 billion years, or disrupted.

For accretion to occur, impact velocities must be less than about twice the escape velocity, which is about 140 m/s (460 ft/s) for a 100 km (60 mi) radius asteroid. Simple models for accretion in the asteroid belt generally assume micrometer-sized dust grains sticking together and settling to the midplane of the nebula to form a dense layer of dust, which, because of gravitational forces, was converted into a disk of kilometer-sized planetesimals. But, several arguments suggest that asteroids may not have accreted this way.

== Accretion of comets ==
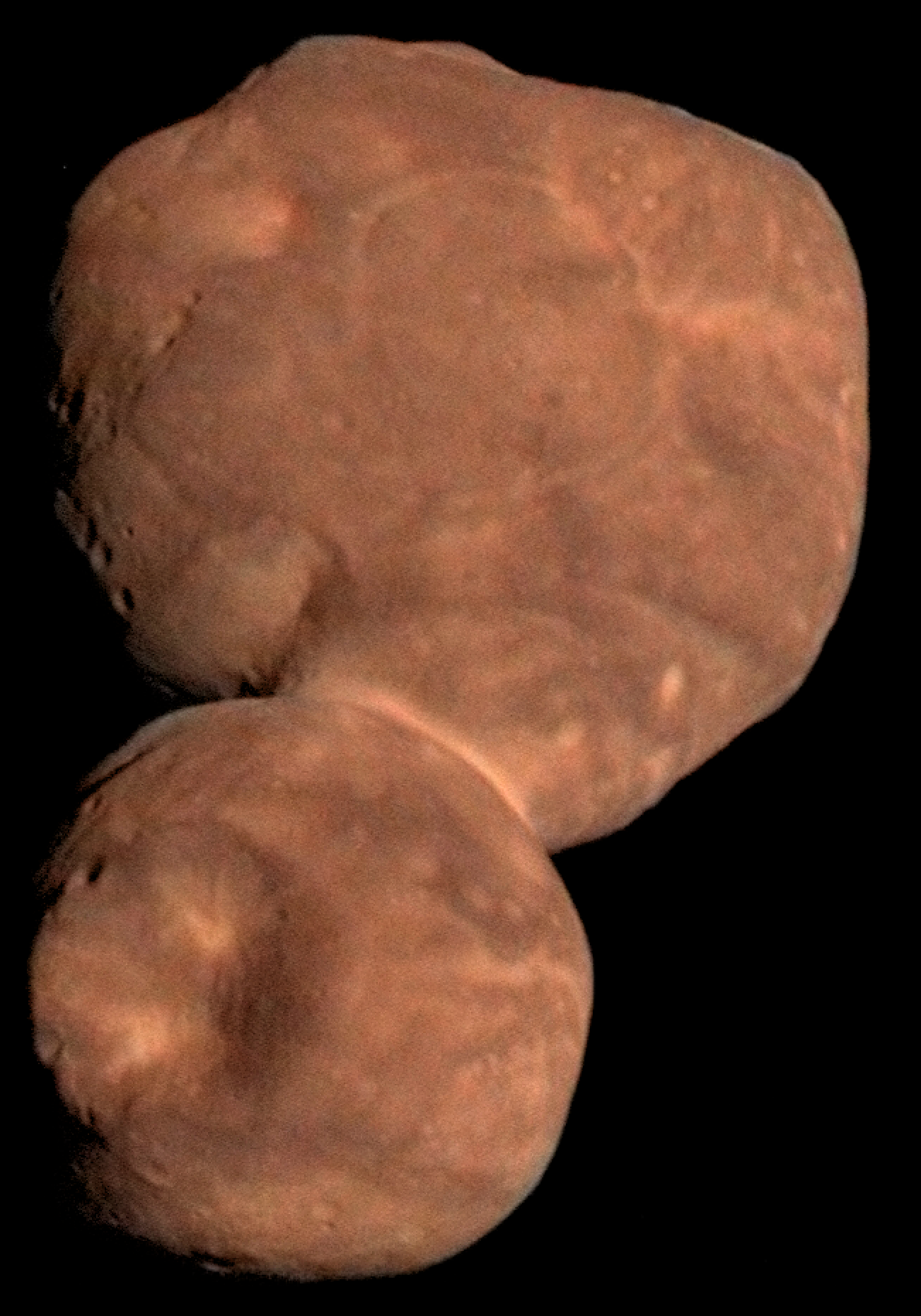
486958 Arrokoth, a Kuiper belt object which is thought to represent the original planetesimals from which the planets grew

Comets, or their precursors, formed in the outer Solar System, possibly millions of years before planet formation. How and when comets formed is debated, with distinct implications for Solar System formation, dynamics, and geology. Three-dimensional computer simulations indicate the major structural features observed on cometary nuclei can be explained by pairwise low velocity accretion of weak cometesimals. The currently favored formation mechanism is that of the nebular hypothesis, which states that comets are probably a remnant of the original planetesimal "building blocks" from which the planets grew.

Astronomers think that comets originate in both the Oort cloud and the scattered disk The scattered disk was created when Neptune migrated outward into the proto-Kuiper belt, which at the time was much closer to the Sun, and left in its wake a population of dynamically stable objects that could never be affected by its orbit (the Kuiper belt proper), and a population whose perihelia are close enough that Neptune can still disturb them as it travels around the Sun (the scattered disk). Because the scattered disk is dynamically active and the Kuiper belt relatively dynamically stable, the scattered disk is now seen as the most likely point of origin for periodic comets. The classic Oort cloud theory states that the Oort cloud, a sphere measuring about 50,000 AU (0.24 pc) in radius, formed at the same time as the solar nebula and occasionally releases comets into the inner Solar System as a giant planet or star passes nearby and causes gravitational disruptions. Examples of such comet clouds may already have been seen in the Helix Nebula.

The Rosetta mission to comet 67P/Churyumov–Gerasimenko determined in 2015 that when Sun's heat penetrates the surface, it triggers evaporation (sublimation) of buried ice. While some of the resulting water vapour may escape from the nucleus, 80% of it recondenses in layers beneath the surface. This observation implies that the thin ice-rich layers exposed close to the surface may be a consequence of cometary activity and evolution, and that global layering does not necessarily occur early in the comet's formation history. While most scientists thought that all the evidence indicated that the structure of nuclei of comets is processed rubble piles of smaller ice planetesimals of a previous generation, the Rosetta mission confirmed the idea that comets are "rubble piles" of disparate material. Comets appear to have formed as ~100-km bodies, then overwhelmingly ground/recontacted into their present states.

== See also ==
- Astrochemistry – Study of molecules in the Universe and their reactions
- Astronomical spectroscopy – Measurement of electromagnetic radiation for astronomy
- Circumplanetary disk – Accumulation of matter around a planet
- Exoasteroid – Asteroids found outside of the Solar System
- List of interstellar and circumstellar molecules
- Nova – Nuclear explosion in a white dwarf star
- Planetary nebula – Type of emission nebula created by dying red giants
- Q-PACE – Spacecraft mission to study stellar accretion
- Quasi-star
- Ring system – Ring of cosmic dust orbiting an astronomical object
- Rubble pile – Celestial body composed of many pieces of rock held together by gravity
- Timeline of gravitational physics and relativity
