= Frost line (astrophysics) =

Distance from a young star where ice forms

In astronomy or planetary science, the frost line, also known as the snow line or ice line, is the minimum distance from the central protostar of a solar nebula where the temperature is low enough for volatile compounds such as water, ammonia, methane, carbon dioxide and carbon monoxide to condense into solid grains, which will allow their accretion into planetesimals. Beyond the line, otherwise gaseous compounds (which are much more abundant) can be quite easily condensed to allow formation of gas giants and ice giants; while within it, only heavier compounds can be accreted to form the typically much smaller rocky planets.

The term itself is borrowed from the notion of "frost line" in soil science, which describes the maximum depth from the surface that groundwater can freeze.

Each volatile substance has its own frost line (e.g., carbon monoxide, nitrogen, and argon), so it is important to always specify which material's frost line is referred to, though omission is common, especially for the water frost line. A tracer gas may be used for materials that are otherwise difficult to detect; for example diazenylium for carbon monoxide.

== Location ==
Different volatile compounds have different condensation temperatures at different partial pressures (thus different densities) in the protostar nebula, so their respective frost lines will differ. The actual temperature and distance for the frost line of water ice depend on the physical model used to calculate it and on the theoretical solar nebula model:

- 170 K at 2.7 astronomical units (AU; Hayashi, 1981)
- 143 K at 3.2 AU to 150 K at 3 AU (Podolak and Zucker, 2010)
- 3.1 AU (Martin and Livio, 2012)
- ≈150 K for μm-size grains and ≈200 K for km-size bodies (D'Angelo and Podolak, 2015)

The location of the frost line changes over time, potentially reaching a maximum radius of 17.4 AU for a solar-mass star before decreasing thereafter.

== Current versus formation frost line ==
The radial position of the condensation/evaporation front varies over time, as the nebula evolves. Occasionally, the term frost line is also used to represent the present distance at which water ice can be stable (even under direct sunlight). This current frost line distance is different from the formation frost line distance – which was in effect during the formation of the Solar System, and approximately equals 5 AU. The reason for the difference is that during the formation of the Solar System, the solar nebula was an opaque cloud where temperatures were lower close to the Sun, and the Sun itself was less energetic. After formation, the ice got buried by infalling dust and it has remained stable a few meters below the surface. If ice within 5 AU is exposed, e.g., by a crater, then it sublimates relatively quickly. However, out of direct sunlight ice can remain stable on the surface of asteroids (and the Moon and Mercury) if it is located in permanently shadowed polar craters, where temperature may remain very low over the age of the Solar System (e.g., 30–40 K on the Moon).

Observations of the asteroid belt, located between Mars and Jupiter, suggest that the water frost line during formation of the Solar System was located within this region. The outer asteroids are icy C-class objects (e.g., Abe et al. 2000; Morbidelli et al. 2000) whereas the inner asteroid belt is largely devoid of water. This implies that when planetesimal formation occurred the frost line was located at around 2.7 AU from the Sun.

For example, the dwarf planet Ceres with semi-major axis of 2.77 AU lies almost exactly at the lower estimate for the water frost line during the formation of the Solar System. Ceres appears to have an icy mantle and may even have a water ocean below the surface. Water ice has been detected on the surface of 24 Themis that orbits the Sun at an average distance of 3.1 AU.

== Planet formation ==
The lower temperature in the nebula beyond the frost line makes many more solid grains available for accretion into planetesimals and eventually planets. The frost line therefore separates terrestrial planets from giant planets in the Solar System. However, giant planets have been found inside the frost line around several other stars (so-called hot Jupiters). They are thought to have formed outside the frost line, and later migrated inwards to their current positions. Earth, which lies less than a quarter of the distance to the frost line but is not a giant planet, has adequate gravitation for keeping methane, ammonia, and water vapor from escaping it. Methane and ammonia are rare in the Earth's atmosphere only because of their instability in an oxygen-rich atmosphere that results from photosynthesis whose biochemistry suggests plentiful methane and ammonia at one time, but of course liquid water and ice, which are chemically stable in such an atmosphere, form much of the surface of Earth.

Researchers Rebecca Martin and Mario Livio have proposed that asteroid belts may tend to form in the vicinity of the frost line, due to nearby giant planets disrupting planet formation inside their orbit. By analysing the temperature of warm dust found around some 90 stars, they concluded that the dust (and therefore possible asteroid belts) was typically found close to the frost line. The underlying mechanism may be the thermal instability of frost line on the timescales of 1,000–10,000 years, resulting in periodic deposition of dust material in relatively narrow circumstellar rings.

== See also ==
- Circumstellar habitable zone
- Nebular hypothesis
- Solar nebula
