= Planetesimal =

Solid objects in protoplanetary disks and debris disks

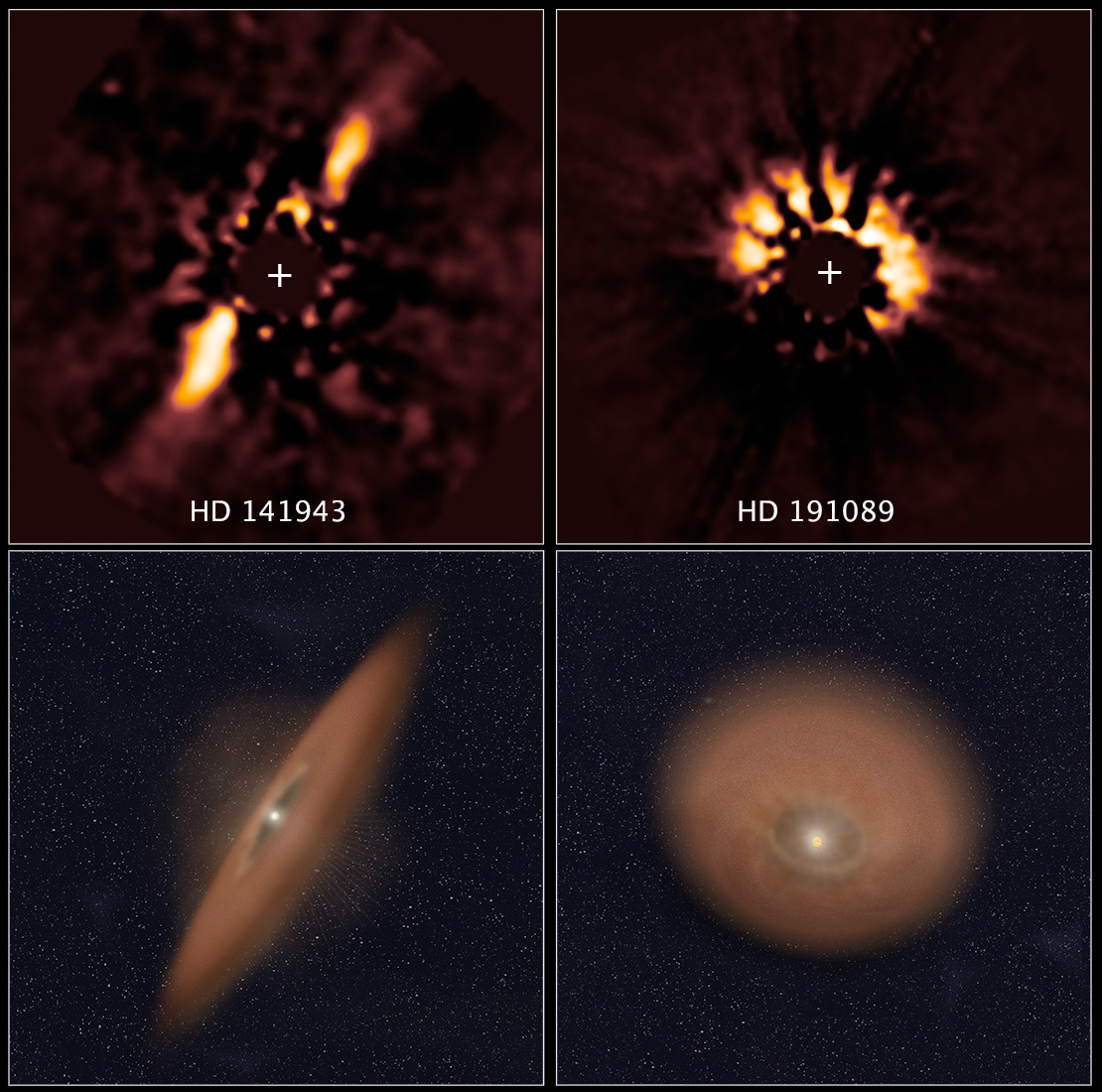
Debris disks detected in Hubble Space Telescope archival images of young stars, HD 141943 and HD 191089, using improved imaging processes (2014)

Planetesimals (/ˌplænɪˈtɛsɪməlz/) are solid objects thought to exist in protoplanetary disks and debris disks. Believed to have formed in the Solar System about 4.6 billion years ago, they aid study of its formation.

== Formation ==
A widely accepted theory of planet formation, the planetesimal hypothesis of Viktor Safronov, states that planets form from cosmic dust grains that collide and stick to form ever-larger bodies. Once a body reaches around a kilometer in size, its constituent grains can attract each other directly through mutual gravity, enormously aiding further growth into moon-sized protoplanets. Smaller bodies must instead rely on Brownian motion or turbulence to cause the collisions leading to sticking. The mechanics of collisions and mechanisms of sticking are intricate. Alternatively, planetesimals may form in a very dense layer of dust grains that undergoes a collective gravitational instability in the mid-plane of a protoplanetary disk—or via the concentration and gravitational collapse of swarms of larger particles in streaming instabilities. Many planetesimals eventually break apart during violent collisions, as 4 Vesta and 90 Antiope may have, but a few of the largest ones may survive such encounters and grow into protoplanets and, later, planets.

== Planetesimals in the Solar System ==
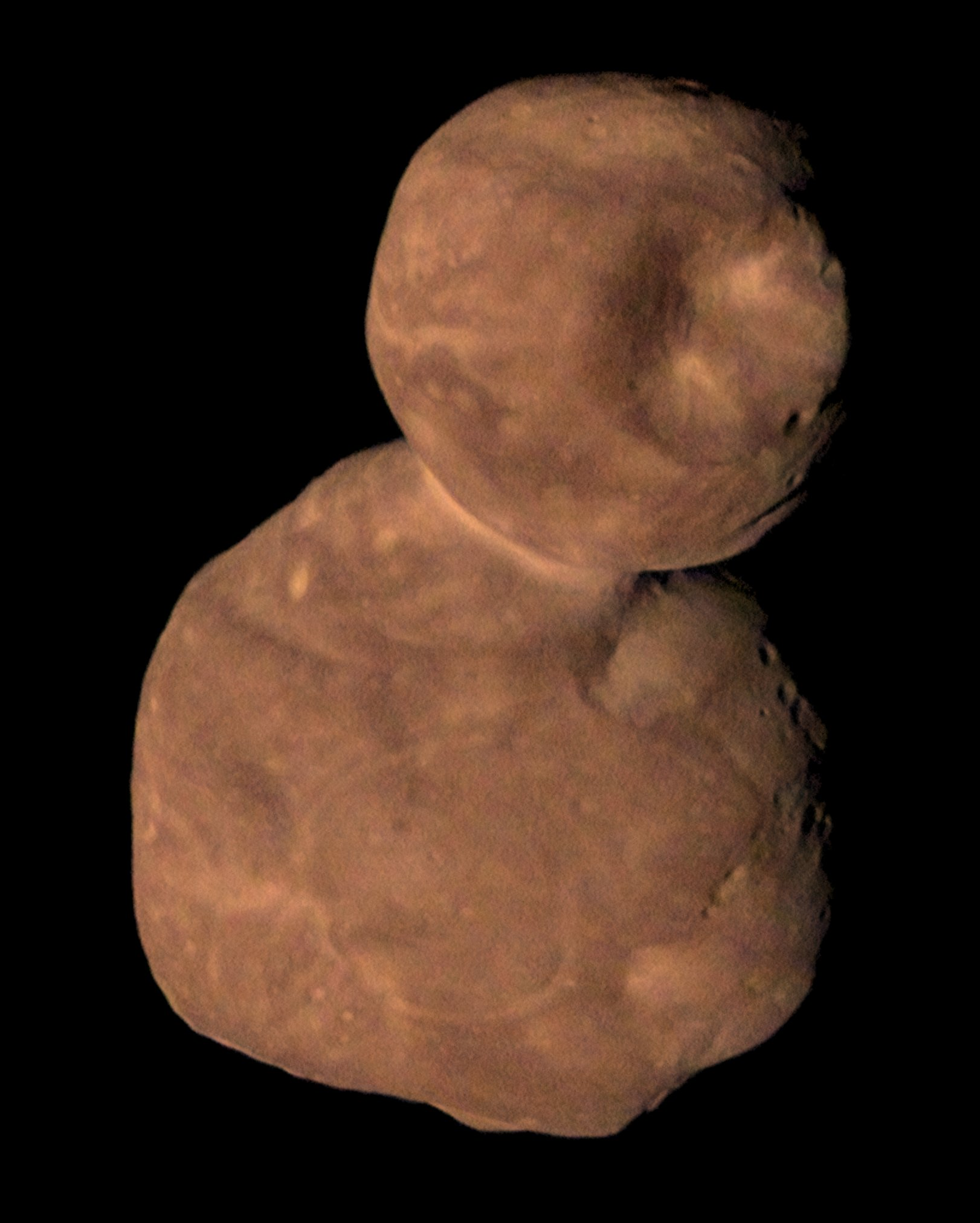
486958 Arrokoth, the first pristine planetesimal visited by a spacecraft

It has been inferred that about 3.8 billion years ago, after a period known as the Late Heavy Bombardment, most of the planetesimals within the Solar System had either been ejected from the Solar System entirely, into distant eccentric orbits such as the Oort cloud, or had collided with larger objects due to the regular gravitational nudges from the giant planets (particularly Jupiter and Neptune). A few planetesimals may have been captured as moons, such as Phoebe (a moon of Saturn) and many other small high-inclination moons of the giant planets.

Planetesimals that have survived to the current day are valuable to science because they contain information about the formation of the Solar System. Although their exteriors are subjected to intense solar radiation that can alter their chemistry, their interiors contain pristine material essentially untouched since the planetesimal was formed. This makes each planetesimal a 'time capsule', and their composition might reveal the conditions in the presolar nebula from which our planetary system was formed. The most primitive planetesimal visited by spacecraft is the contact binary Arrokoth.

== Etymology ==
The word planetesimal is derived from the word infinitesimal and means an ultimately small fraction of a planet.

While the name is always applied to small bodies during the process of planet formation, some scientists also use the term planetesimal as a general term to refer to many small Solar System bodies – such as asteroids and comets – which are left over from the formation process. A group of the world's leading planet formation experts decided at a conference in 2006 on the following definition of a planetesimal:

A planetesimal is a solid object arising during the accumulation of orbiting bodies whose internal strength is dominated by self-gravity and whose orbital dynamics is not significantly affected by gas drag. This corresponds to objects larger than approximately 1 km in the solar nebula.

Bodies large enough to not only keep together by gravitation but to also change the path of approaching rocks over distances of several radii start to grow faster. These bodies, larger than 100 km to 1000 km, are called embryos or protoplanets.

In the current Solar System, these small bodies are usually also classified by dynamics and composition, and may have subsequently evolved to become comets, Kuiper belt objects or trojan asteroids, for example. In other words, some planetesimals became other types of body once planetary formation had finished, and may be referred to by either or both names.

The above definition is not endorsed by the International Astronomical Union, and other working groups may choose to adopt the same or a different definition. The dividing line between a planetesimal and protoplanet is typically framed in terms of the size and the stages of development that the potential planet has already gone through: planetesimals combine to form a protoplanet, and protoplanets continue to grow (faster than planetesimals).

== See also ==
- Accretion (astrophysics)
- Disrupted planet
- List of interstellar and circumstellar molecules
- Mesoplanet
- Planetary nebula
- Q-PACE, a spacecraft mission to study accretion
- Ring system (astronomy)
