= Circumtriple planet =

Planet that orbits three stars

A circumtriple planet (or circum-ternary planet) is a planet that is orbiting three stars at the same time. Such planets are likely to be very rare objects in the universe.

== Examples ==
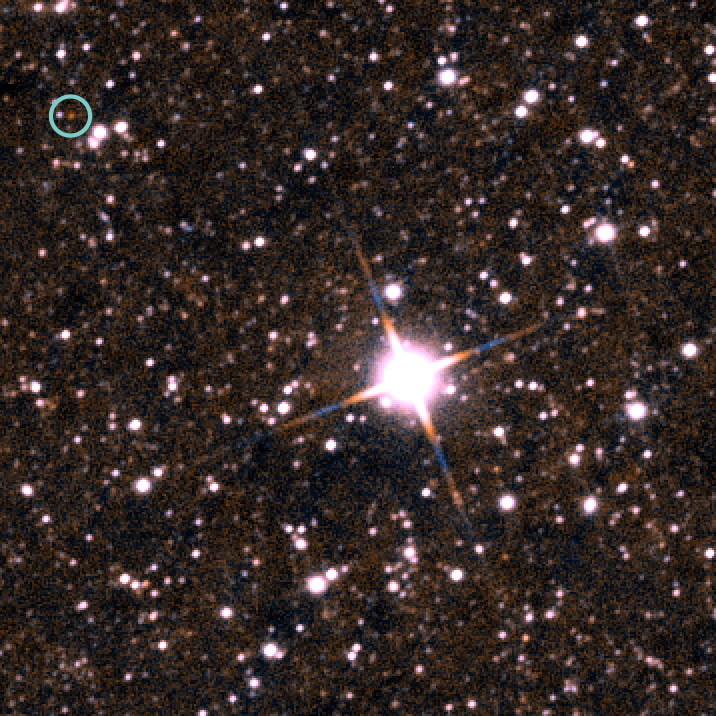
Gliese 900 (the brightest star) and its planet (circled) as seen by the WISE telescope.

The only confirmed circumtriple planet, as of 2024, is Gliese 900 b (CWISE J233531.55+014219.6). It was found to be gravitationally bound to the Gliese 900 system in 2024, at a projected separation of 12,000 au, thus becoming the planet with the longest orbital period.

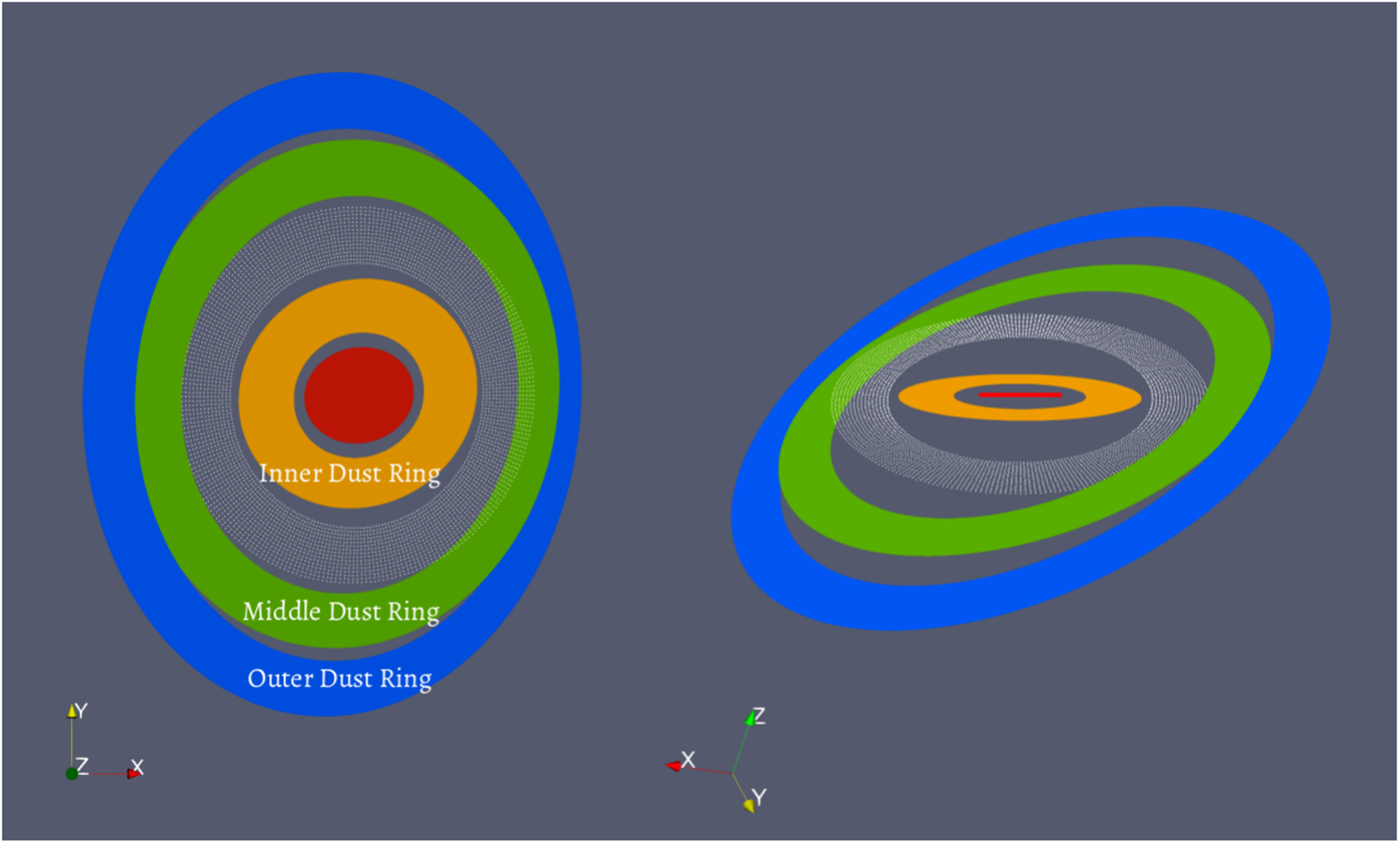
Schematic diagram showing a proposed geometry of the GW Orionis star system. Scientists have observed abnormalities in the behavior patterns of the three stars and have speculated that an unseen planet may be orbiting all three stars simultaneously.

As of 2021, it is suspected that the star system GW Orionis, which contains a large disk of dust and gases and is about 1,300 light years away from Earth, has a circumtriple planet within a gap observed in the dust cloud. The planet itself has not been seen but its influence may explain gravitational oddities within the star system. By using computer modeling, some scientists believe that a Jupiter-sized planet may be able to explain the star system's rings and strange behavior.

In 2022, tentative evidence of a very small planet was found around the triple system PSR J0337+1715. In 2024, additional data allowed the planet's mass to be constrained to 0.0041±0.003 M_{🜨}, making it one of the smallest objects directly detected outside the Solar System so far. However, in 2025 it was suggested that the planet is not real, but instead an artifact of "red noise", which is a product of variability within the pulsar in the system.

Three stars of GG Tau A are surrounded in protoplanetary disks, which can evolve into a circumtriple planet.

== In fiction ==
A circumtriple planet is prominently featured in the Remembrance of Earth's Past book series. In the series, the planet of Trisolaris orbits a three-star system, and the chaotic nature of the system drives the native species of the planet to seek refuge on Earth, which has a comparatively more "stable" one-star system.
