= Andrew Prentice =

Australian mathematician

Andrew Prentice is an Australian mathematician. He is known for developing an alternative model of planetary formation. In contrast to the conventional model where planetary accretion occurs within a continuous disk, according to Prentice's "Modern Laplacian Theory" each planet accretes within a discrete circumsolar gas ring. Prentice's nested gas rings arise due to the effect of 'supersonic turbulent convection' in slowing the infall of interstellar dust and gas. Instead of collapsing directly to form a flat continuous disk, due to 'turbulent stress' the gas temporarily remains puffed up in a vast rotating spheroidal atmosphere around the protosolar core. This atmosphere spins faster as it slowly contracts. It rids itself of excess angular momentum by sequentially shedding gas rings from its equator. The same process repeats itself on a much smaller scale for each of the giant planets to produce their regular satellite systems. Prentice has used his unorthodox model to make a range of surprisingly accurate predictions about the Solar System. He is currently Emeritus Professor in the School of Mathematical Sciences at Monash University.

== Lecturing style ==
Andrew Prentice was a member of the lecturing staff at Monash University, Clayton; he received a Vice-Chancellor's Award for Teaching Excellence in 2011.

== Predictions ==
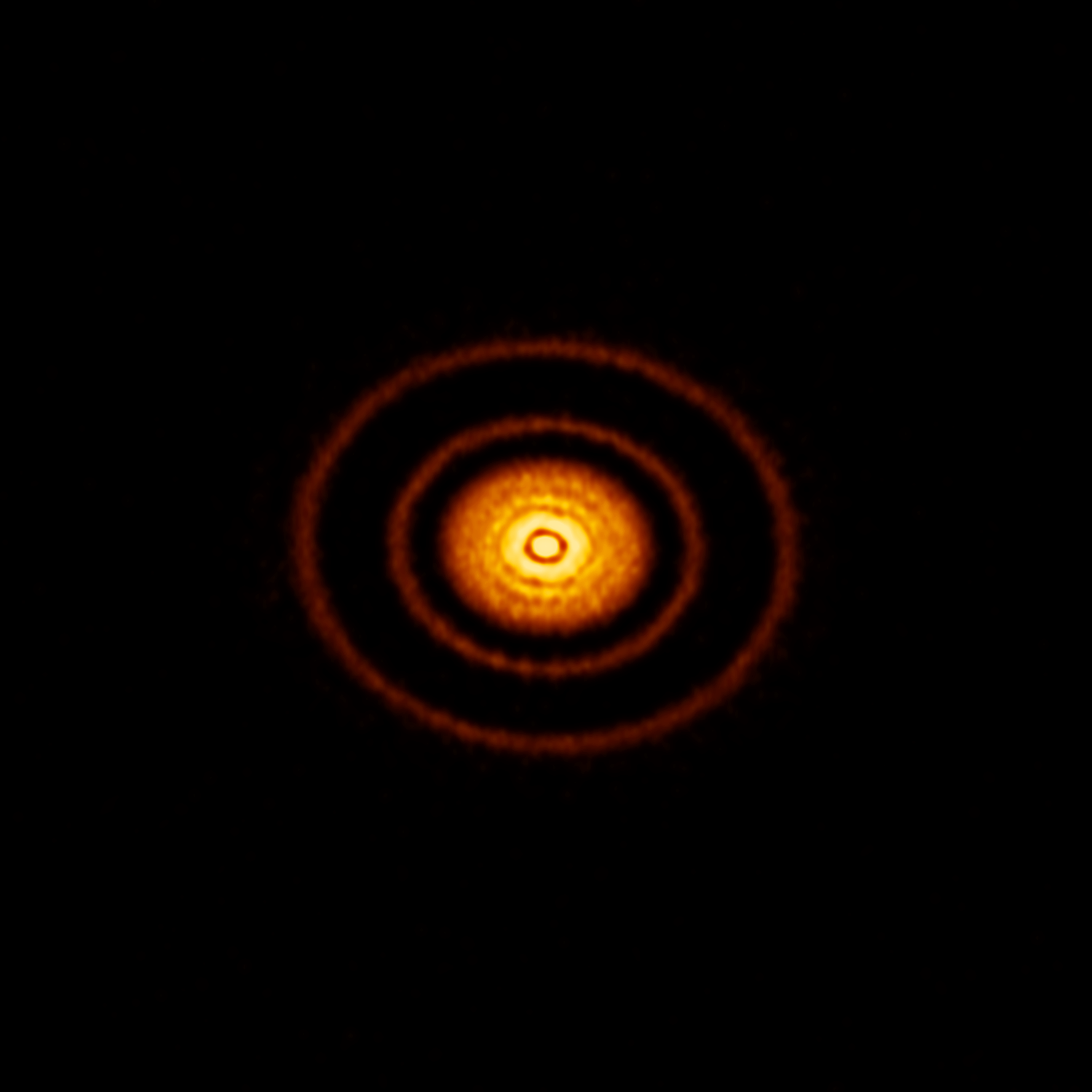
Circumstellar rings of AS 209

In 2014 the ALMA radio telescope started observing the inner regions around young stars, such as HL Tauri and AS 209, where planets were thought to be forming. To the surprise of the astronomical community ALMA found that most of these stars are encircled by sets of concentric rings, similar to those described by Prentice in 1978, rather than continuous disks.

Prentice has made a long list of controversial predictions about the nature of the Solar System in an attempt to demonstrate the validity of his Modern Laplacian Theory. Critics have dismissed the theory pointing out that the convectively driven 'supersonic turbulence' proposed by Prentice is theoretically impossible and that his gas rings would be dynamically unstable, but to the surprise of many of his colleagues, NASA missions have confirmed that many of his deductions from the theory were remarkably accurate. Some of his best known predictions are:

- In 1977, Prentice hypothesised that a rocky moon belt existed at four planetary radii from Jupiter's centre. Two years later, such a rocky ring was discovered, though closer to Jupiter than Prentice had predicted.
- He predicted that Uranus had two more moons or moonlet streams than commonly thought. Nine years later, a new moon (Puck), was discovered to be orbiting Uranus, in addition to a family of nine moonlets.
- In 1981, Prentice theorised that the mass of Saturn's moon Tethys was in fact 20–25% larger than the generally predicted level. Three months later, it was confirmed to be 21% larger than previously thought.
- In 1989, he predicted that Neptune had four additional dark moons, at 5, 3.5, 2.5 and 1.8 radii in Neptune's equatorial plane. By the end of the year, four dark moons were discovered in Neptune's equatorial plane at 7, 3, 2.5 and 2.1 radii.
- He predicted that dry ice would be the main carbon-bearing chemical on Triton. Three years later, infrared devices confirmed this.

== Selected works ==
- Prentice, Andrew J. R. (2006). "Saturn's Icy Moon Rhea: A Prediction for its Bulk Chemical Composition and Physical Structure at the Time of the Cassini Spacecraft First Flyby". Publications of the Astronomical Society of Australia. 23 (1): 1–11. arXiv:astro-ph/0512115. Bibcode:2006PASA...23....1P. doi:10.1071/as05041. S2CID 55521338.
- Prentice, Andrew J. R.; Jontof-Hutter, D. (2005). "Origin and bulk chemical composition of mercury". In O. Engvold (ed.). Highlights of Astronomy, Vol 13. Vol. 13. pp. 73–74.
- Prentice, Andrew J. R.; Dyt, C. P. (2003). "A numerical simulation of supersonic turbulent convection relating to the formation of the Solar system". Monthly Notices of the Royal Astronomical Society. 341 (2): 644–656. Bibcode:2003MNRAS.341..644P. doi:10.1046/j.1365-8711.2003.06454.x.
- Prentice, Andrew J. R.; Dyt, C. P. (2001). "A Numerical Simulation of Supersonic Turbulent Convection Relating to the Formation of the Solar System". NASA STI/Recon Technical Report N. 02 (39526).
- Prentice, Andrew J. R. (1999). "Origin, bulk chemical composition and physical structure of the Galilean satellites of Jupiter: A post-Galileo analysis". Earth, Moon, and Planets. 87 (1): 11–55. Bibcode:1999EM&P...87...11P. doi:10.1023/A:1010692812892. hdl:2060/20000056869. S2CID 55834227.
- Dyt, C. P.; Prentice, Andrew J. R. (1998). "A numerical simulation of supersonic thermal convection". Monthly Notices of the Royal Astronomical Society. 296 (1): 56–65. Bibcode:1998MNRAS.296...56D. doi:10.1046/j.1365-8711.1998.01240.x.
- Prentice, Andrew J. R. (1996). "Origin and bulk chemical composition of the Galilean satellites and the primitive atmosphere of Jupiter: A pre-Galileo analysis". Earth, Moon, and Planets. 73 (3): 237–258. Bibcode:1996EM&P...73..237P. doi:10.1007/bf00115883. S2CID 122900208.
- Prentice, Andrew J. R. (1996). "Internal structure and bulk chemical composition of Io: A pre-Galileo prediction". Physics Letters A. 213 (5–6): 253–258. Bibcode:1996PhLA..213..253P. doi:10.1016/0375-9601(96)00156-9.
- Prentice, Andrew J. R. (1993). "The Origin And Composition of Pluto And Charon – Chemically Uniform Models". Proceedings Astronomical Society of Australia. 10 (3): 189–195. Bibcode:1993PASA...10..189P. doi:10.1017/S1323358000025649. S2CID 115810027.
- Prentice, A. (1991). "Voyage to the Origin of the Solar-System". Search. 22 (3): 101–103.
- Prentice, Andrew J. R. (1990). "Iron Silicate Fractionation and the Formation of the Inner Planets". Meteoritics. 25 (4): 399–400. Bibcode:1990Metic..25R.399P.
- Prentice, Andrew J. R. (1990). "Neptune Triton – A Moon Rich in Dry Ice And Carbon". Proceedings Astronomical Society of Australia. 8 (4): 364–367. Bibcode:1990PASA....8..364P. doi:10.1017/S1323358000023742. hdl:2060/19900007359. S2CID 118280966.
- Prentice, Andrew J. R. (1989). "Neptune: Predicted origin and composition of a regular satellite system". Physics Letters A. 140 (5): 265–270. Bibcode:1989PhLA..140..265P. doi:10.1016/0375-9601(89)90937-7.
- Prentice, Andrew J. R. (1986). "Uranus: Predicted origin and composition of its atmosphere, moons and rings". Physics Letters A. 114 (4): 211–216. Bibcode:1986PhLA..114..211P. doi:10.1016/0375-9601(86)90209-4.
- Prentice, Andrew J. R. (1984). "Formation of the saturnian system: A modern Laplacian theory". Earth, Moon, and Planets. 30 (3): 209–228. Bibcode:1984EM&P...30..209P. doi:10.1007/bf00056200. S2CID 123634348.
- Prentice, Andrew J. R.; ter Haar, D. (1979). "Formation of the regular satellite systems and rings of the major planets". The Moon and the Planets. 21 (1): 43–62. Bibcode:1979M&P....21...43P. doi:10.1007/bf00897054. S2CID 122103729.
- Prentice, Andrew J. R.; ter Haar, D. (1979). "Origin of the jovian ring and the galilean satellites [3]". Nature. 280 (5720): 300–302. Bibcode:1979Natur.280..300P. doi:10.1038/280300a0. S2CID 4340580.
- Prentice, Andrew J. R. (1978). "Origin of the solar system – I: Gravitational contraction of the turbulent protosun and the shedding of a concentric system of gaseous laplacian rings". The Moon and the Planets. 19 (3): 341–398. Bibcode:1978M&P....19..341P. doi:10.1007/bf00898829. S2CID 123376299.
- Prentice, Andrew J. R. (1976). "Supersonic Turbulent Convection, Inhomogeneities of Chemical Composition, and the Solar Neutrino Problem". Astronomy and Astrophysics. 50 (1): 59–70. Bibcode:1976A&A....50...59P.
- Prentice, Andrew J. R. (1973). "On Turbulent Stress and the Structure of Young Convective Stars". Astronomy and Astrophysics. 27: 237–248. Bibcode:1973A&A....27..237P.
