= GW Orionis =

Star in the constellation Orion

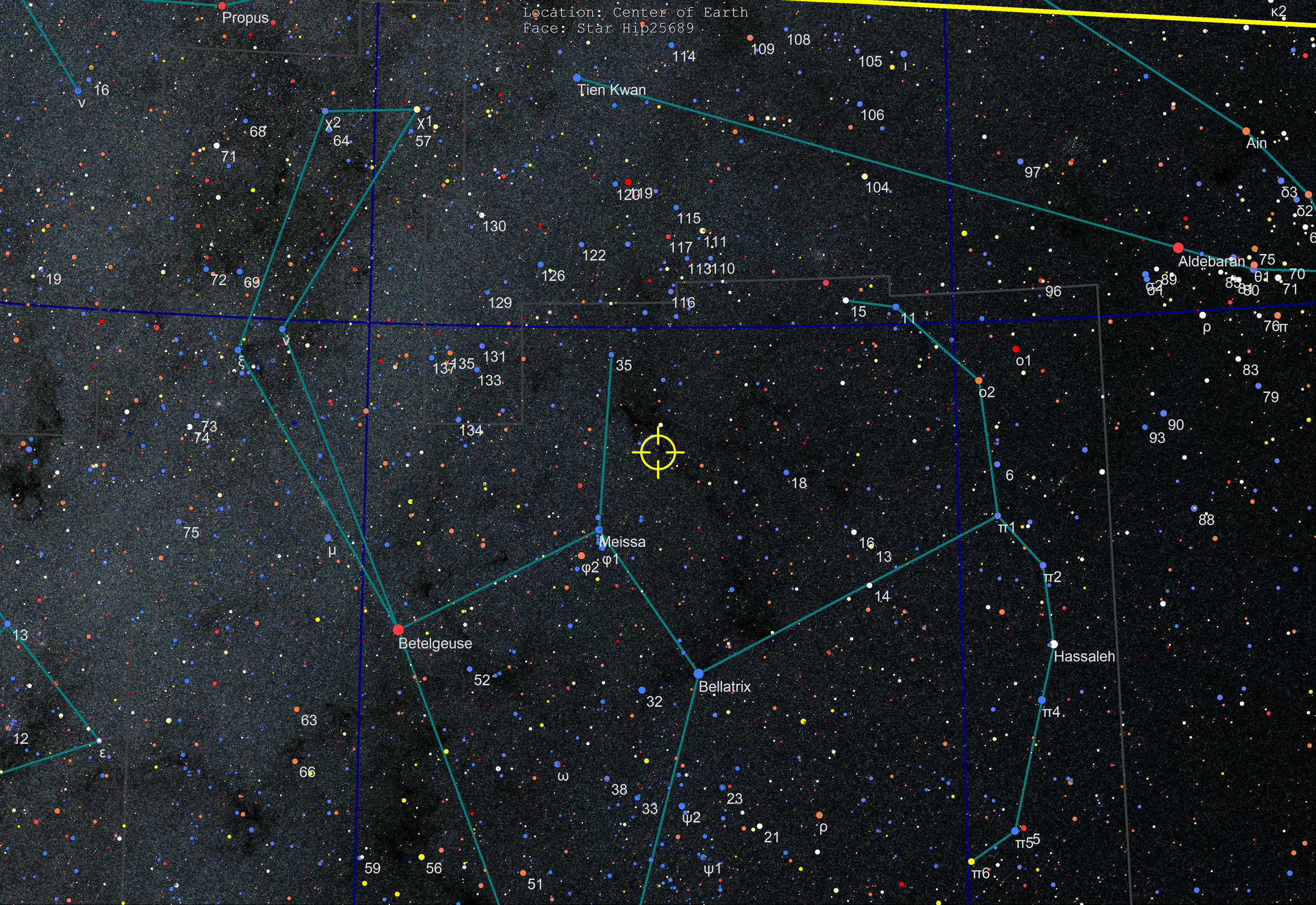
- GW Orionis in the constellation Orion (yellow circle)

Observation data Epoch J2000 Equinox J2000
- Constellation: Orion
- Right ascension: 05^{h} 29^{m} 08.3929^{s}
- Declination: +11° 52′ 12.666″
- Apparent magnitude (V): 9.7–10.4

Characteristics
- Evolutionary stage: pre-main sequence
- Spectral type: G8V or G3V/K0V
- Variable type: T Tau

Astrometry
Radial velocity (R_{v})	28.33±0.18 km/s
Proper motion (μ)	RA: −2.351±0.061 mas/yr Dec.: −0.396±0.043 mas/yr
Parallax (π)	2.4510±0.0623 mas
Distance	1,330 ± 30 ly (410 ± 10 pc)

Orbit
Primary	GW Orionis A
Name	GW Orionis B
Period (P)	241.50±0.05 d
Semi-major axis (a)	1.25±0.05 AU
Eccentricity (e)	0.13±0.01
Inclination (i)	151+1 −2°
Longitude of the node (Ω)	263±13°
Periastron epoch (T)	2456681±4 HJD
Argument of periastron (ω) (secondary)	197±7°
Semi-amplitude (K_{1}) (primary)	8.34±0.15 km/s

Orbit
Primary	GW Orionis AB
Name	GW Orionis C
Period (P)	4246±66 d
Semi-major axis (a)	9.19±0.32 AU
Eccentricity (e)	0.13±0.07
Inclination (i)	130+28 −27°
Longitude of the node (Ω)	282±9°
Periastron epoch (T)	2453911±260 HJD
Argument of periastron (ω) (secondary)	310±21°
Semi-amplitude (K_{1}) (primary)	2.38±0.23 km/s

Details

GW Orionis A
Mass	2.74+0.15 −0.52 M_{☉}
Temperature	5780±100 K
Rotational velocity (v sin i)	43 km/s
Age	0.3–1.3 Myr

GW Orionis B
Mass	1.65+0.10 −0.31 M_{☉}
Temperature	5250±100 K
Rotational velocity (v sin i)	50 km/s
Age	0.3–1.3 Myr

GW Orionis C
Mass	0.88+0.85 −0.19 M_{☉}
Age	0.3–1.3 Myr

Other designations
- MHA 265-2, HD 244138, HIP 25689, TYC 708-1901-1, 2MASS J05290838+1152126

Database references
SIMBAD	data

GW Orionis is a T Tauri type pre-main sequence hierarchical triple star system. It is associated with the Lambda Orionis star-forming region and has an extended circumtrinary protoplanetary disk.

== Observational history ==
GW Orionis first came to the attention of astronomers when it was published, as MHA 265–2, in a list of stars whose spectra have bright H and K lines of calcium.

The multiple nature of GW Orionis was first discovered by Robert D. Mathieu, Fred Adams, and David W. Latham during a radial velocity survey of late-type H-alpha emission stars in the Lambda Orionis Association, published in 1991. Radial velocities of the primary star were measured from 45 high-resolution spectra and were used to determine the orbital elements. A trend in the radial velocity residuals indicated either an additional stellar companion with an orbital period of years or a global asymmetric gravitational instability in a circumstellar disc.

GW Orionis B and the third member of the system, GW Orionis C, were detected directly in 2011 using the IOTA interferometer located on Mount Hopkins in Arizona.

== Variability ==
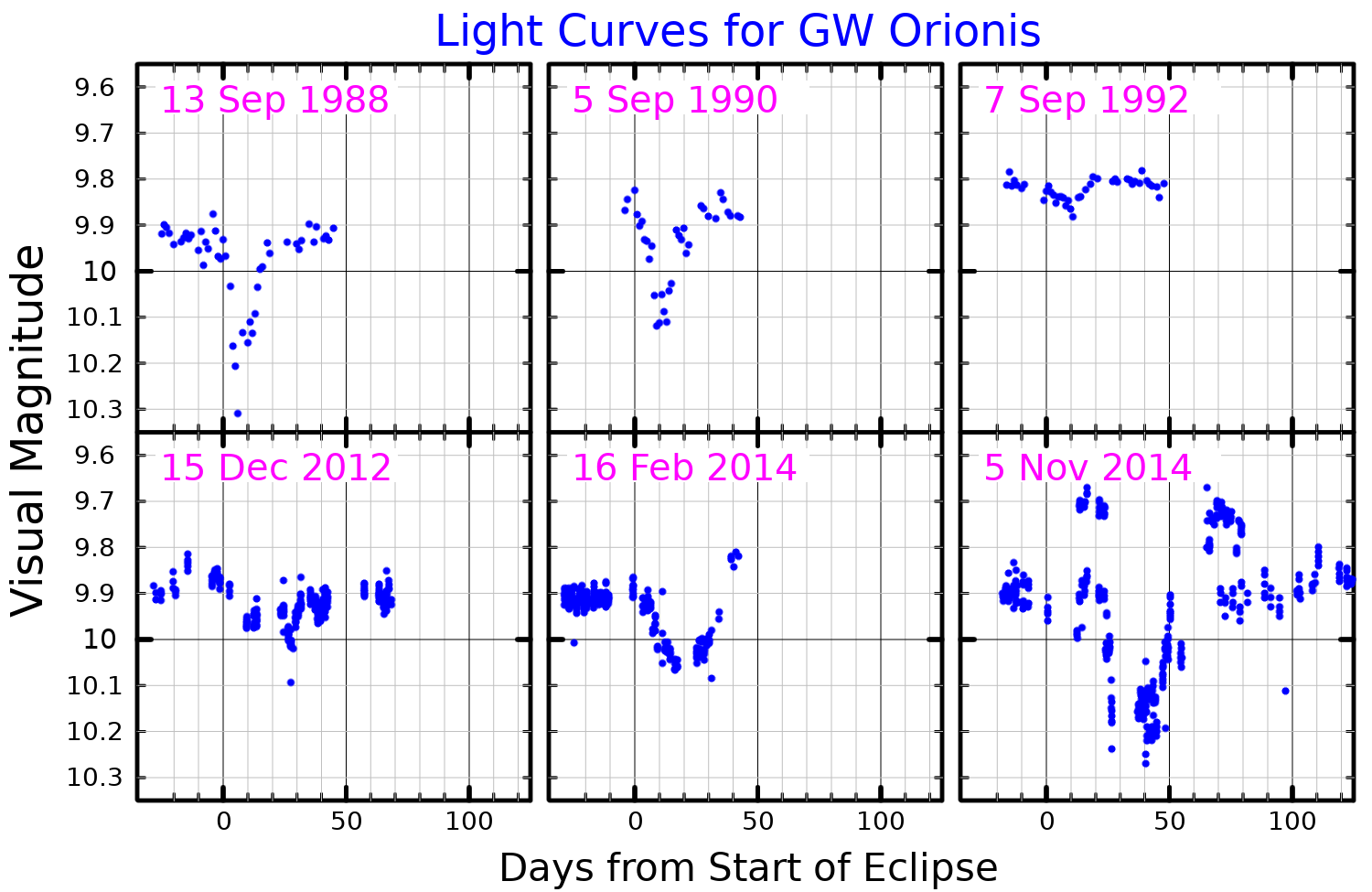
Visual band light curves for several eclipse minima of GW Orionis, adapted from Czekala et al. (2017)

GW Orionis is a variable star with quasi-periodic brightness changes. The apparent magnitude varies between 9.7 and 10.4 with dimming events of between 0.1 and 0.7 magnitudes roughly every 30 days, as well as more sinusoidal variations with an amplitude of 0.2 magnitudes over 11.6 years.

The lightcurve of GW Orionis varies with periods of 3.02 and 1.92 days, which likely correspond to the rotation periods of GW Orionis A and B, respectively.

An initial interpretation of the variability was that a disk of material around component B was eclipsing component A and causing the dimming events, but it is now thought that the eclipses are caused by partial obscuration of both stars by a much larger ring which precesses around the pair.

== Protoplanetary disk ==
The inner ring of GW Orionis: model and SPHERE observations

GW Orionis has a large and massive protoplanetary disk surrounding it. The dust continuum emission suggests a disk radius of approximately 400 astronomical units. The disk has an inclination of 137.6°. Observations of the disk made with the Atacama Large Millimeter Array identified three separate dust rings located at ~46, 188, and 338 astronomical units from the center of the system. The three rings have estimated dust masses 74, 168, and 245 times that of the Earth. According to Jiaqing Bi and coauthors, the outermost ring is the largest protoplanetary dust ring they are aware of. The dust rings are misaligned and the innermost dust ring is eccentric, probably due to ongoing dynamical interactions between the triple stars and the circumtriple disk.

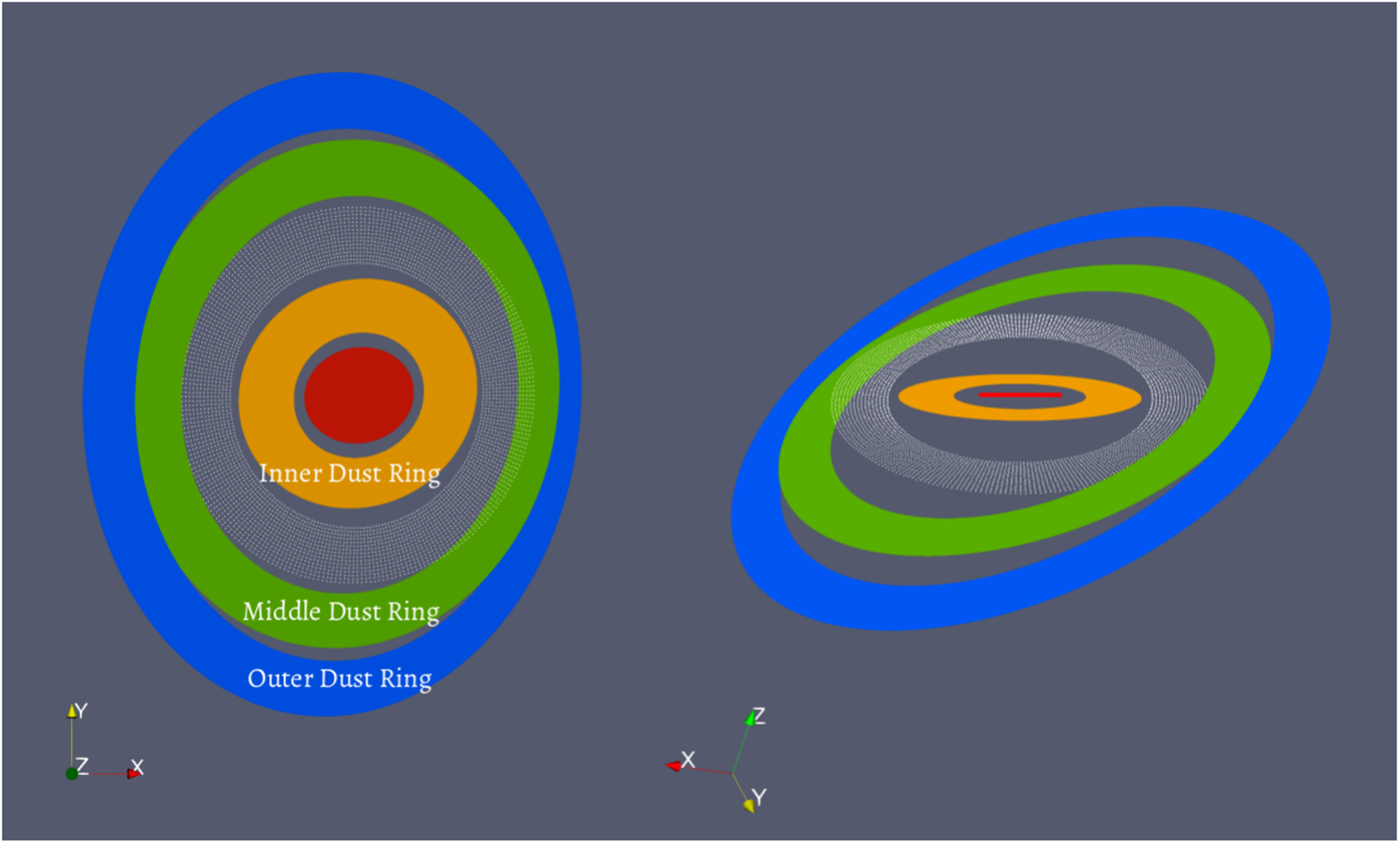
Schematic diagram showing a proposed geometry of the GW Orionis system.

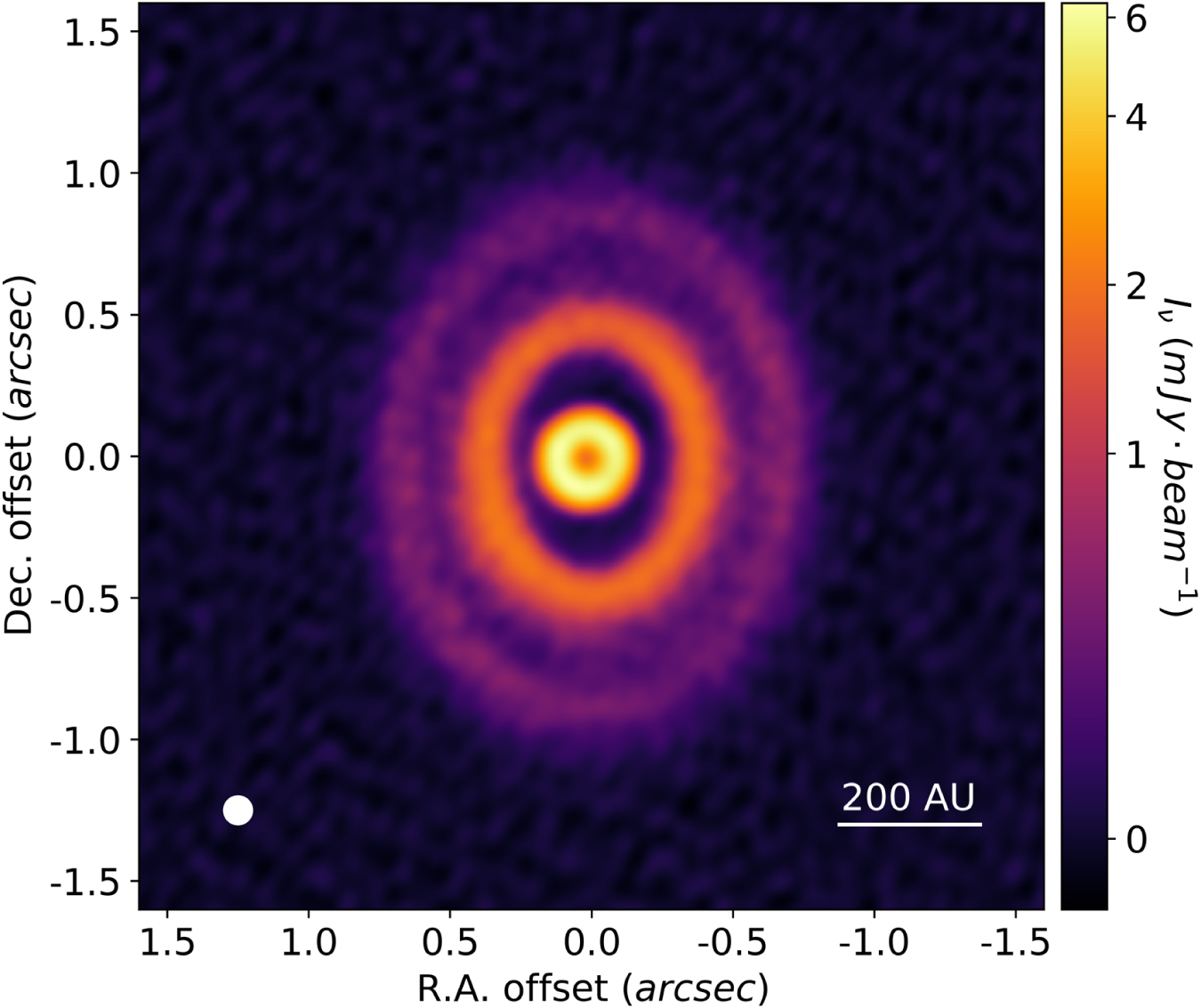
ALMA self-calibrated dust continuum map of the GW Orionis system.

== Orbital architecture ==
The A and B components of GW Orionis form a double-lined spectroscopic binary with a 241-day period while component C orbits the inner pair with an 11.5 year period. It is likely that at least one of the stellar orbital planes is misaligned with the plane of the protoplanetary disk by as much as 45°.

== See also ==
- Circumtriple planet
- Gliese 900
