= AS 209 =

Star with a ring protoplanetary disk and two possible planets

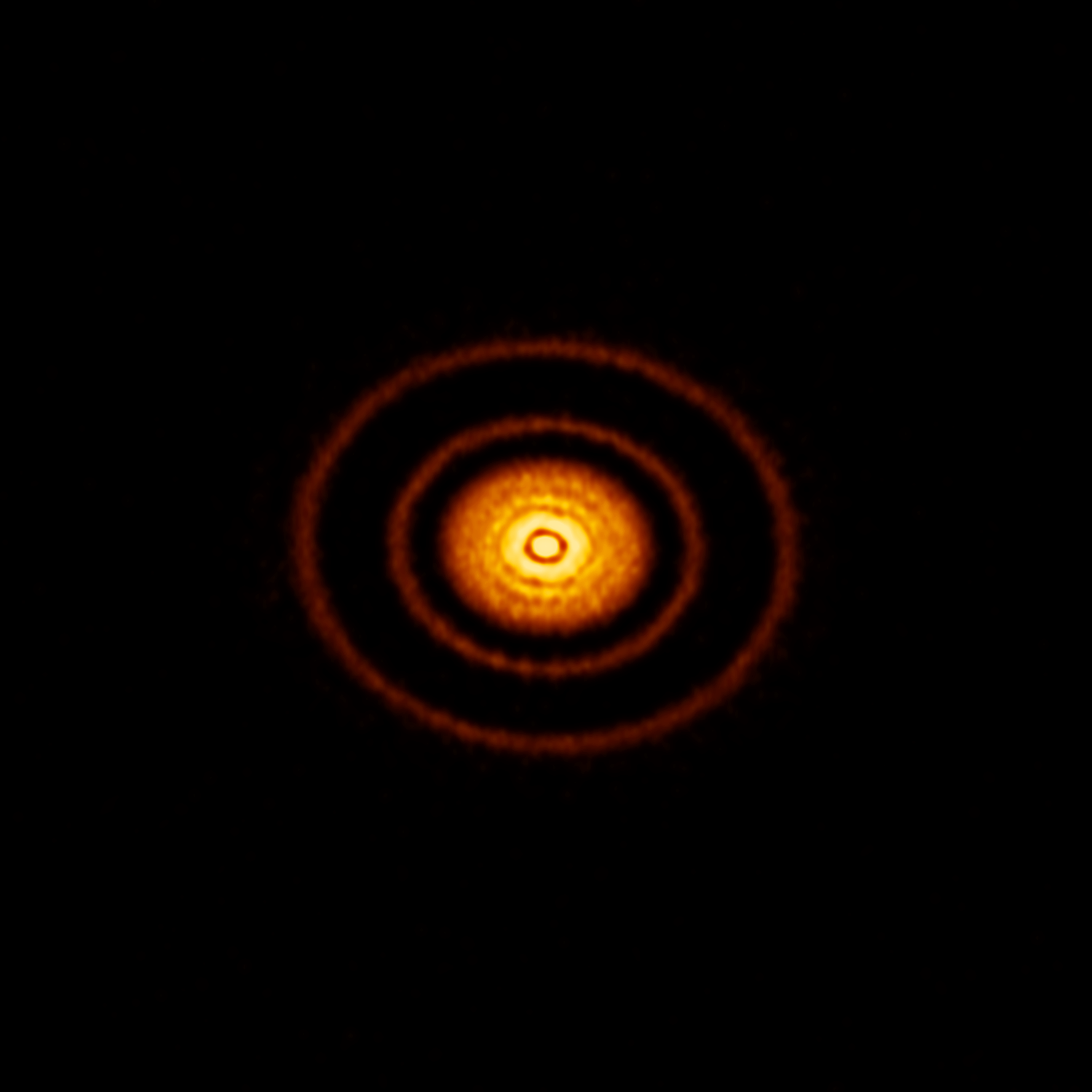
- Image of protoplanetary disk that surrounds AS 209. Here we can see the prominent rings around the star

Observation data Epoch J2000 Equinox J2000
- Constellation: Ophiuchus
- Right ascension: 16^{h} 49^{m} 15.303^{s}
- Declination: –14° 22′ 08.64″
- Apparent magnitude (V): 11.28

Characteristics
- Evolutionary stage: pre-main sequence
- Spectral type: K4Ve
- Variable type: T Tauri

Astrometry
| Proper motion (μ) | RA: -7.366 mas/yr Dec.: -23.658 mas/yr |
| Parallax (π) | 8.2477±0.0290 mas |
| Distance | 395 ± 1 ly (121.2 ± 0.4 pc) |

Details
| Mass | 0.9 M_{☉} |
| Luminosity | 1.5 L_{☉} |
| Age | 0.5-1.0 Myr |

Other designations
- V1121 Oph, HIP 82323, TYC 5641-480-1, IRAS 16464-1416, AS 209, PDS 92

Database references
| SIMBAD | data |

AS 209 is a young pre-main-sequence K-type star located in the Ophiuchus star formation region about 126 parsecs from the Sun. It has a mass of 0.9 solar masses and a luminosity of 1.5 solar luminosity. It is only somewhere between 0.5-1.0 million years old. Surrounding AS 209 is a remarkable protoplanetary disk. This disk is separated into several distinct parts. There the central core and extending from it lies two prominent rings at 75 AU and 135 AU. These rings have different widths and depths with the inner one being narrower and shallower.

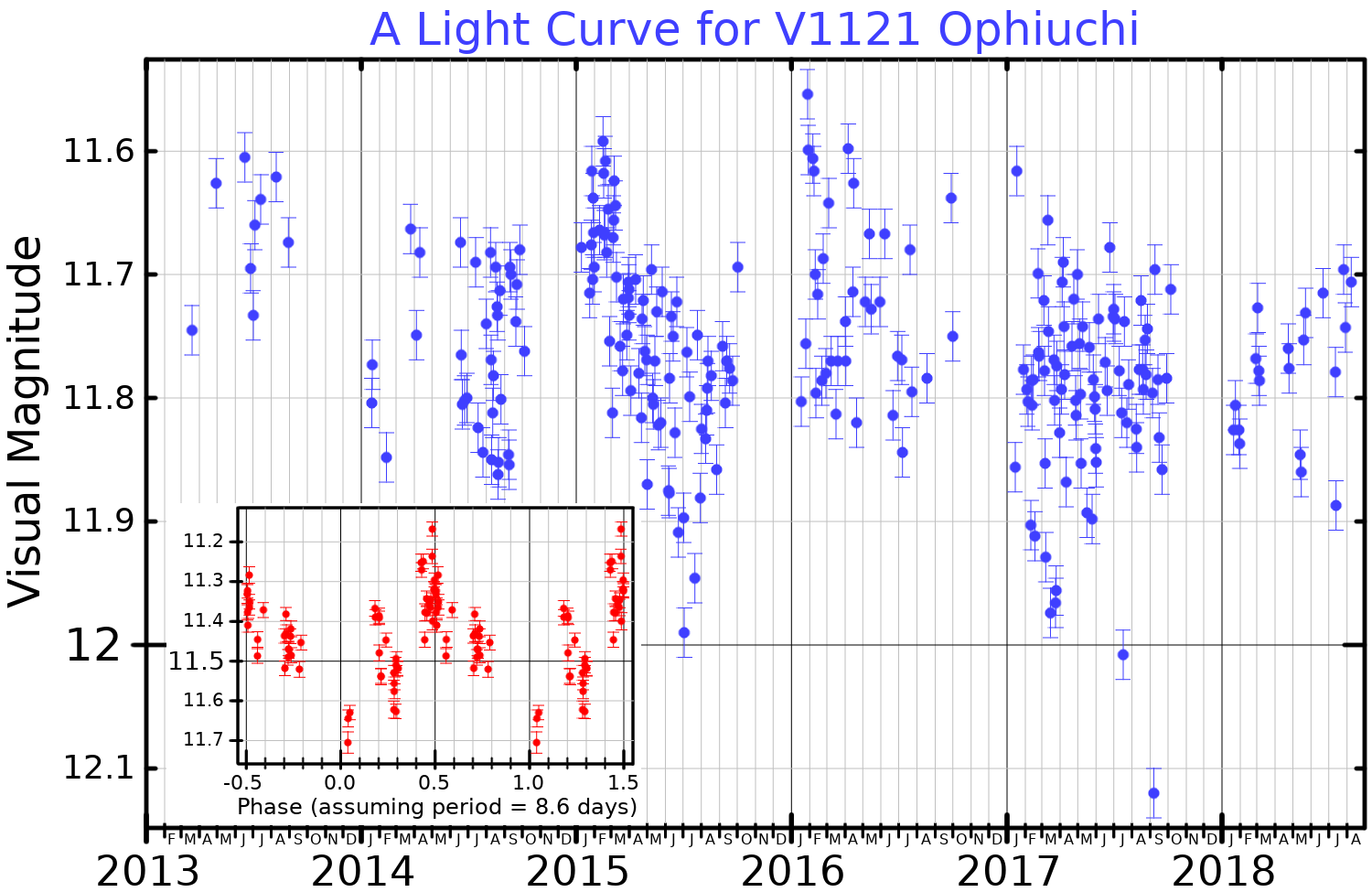
A light curve for V1121 Ophiuchi. The main plot shows the ASAS-SN data, and the inset plot shows the Hipparcos data folded with a period of 8.60 days.

AS 209 was found to be a variable star in 1968. and it was given the variable star designation V1121 Ophiuchi, in 1970. The International Variable Star Index classifies it as both a classical T Tauri star and a T Tauri star showing periodic variability due to starspots. The Hipparcos data for the star shows periodic variability. S. A. Artemenko et al. determined that the period is 8.60 days, in 2012.

The gap of the outer disk suggest that there might be a Saturn-like (0.7 Saturn mass) exoplanet orbiting the star at a distance of 62 AU. There may also be a second planet with 0.1 Jupiter masses orbiting closer to the star than the first planet. The discovery of such planets around a young less than a million year old star shows that giant planets are able to form far from their stars on wide orbits. The outer gap has a background star called AS 209bkg. Astronomers used transmission spectrophotometry to measure the extinction of the gap. This was the first such measurement for a disk gap. The scientists found that the grains in the outer disk have a size that is larger than for the interstellar medium. The researchers conclude that even gaps in disks can obscure emission from protoplanets.
