= V883 Orionis =

Protostar in the Orion constellation

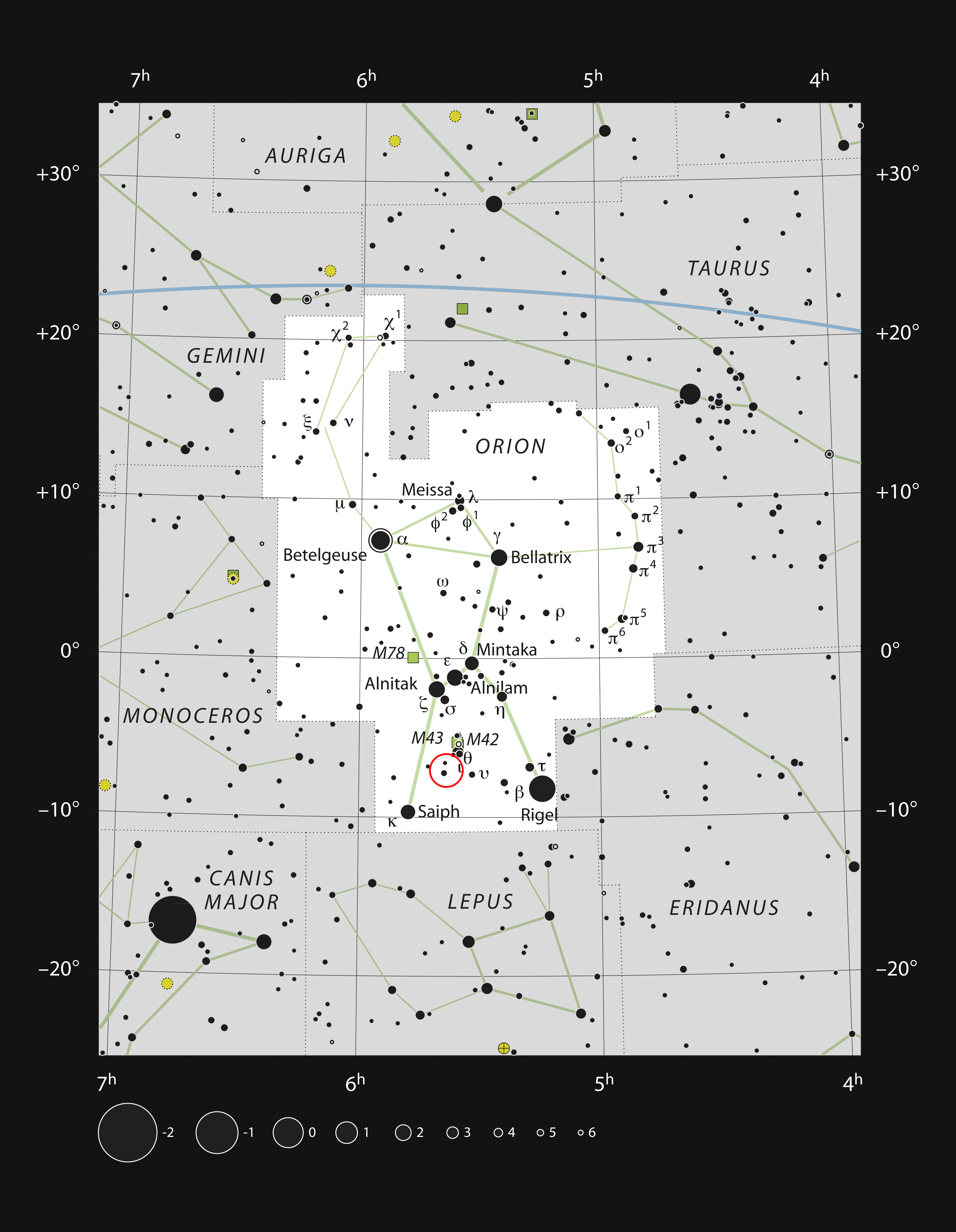
- The location of V883 Orionis (circled)

Observation data Epoch J2000 Equinox J2000
- Constellation: Orion
- Right ascension: 05^{h} 38^{m} 18.102^{s}
- Declination: −07° 02′ 26.02″

Characteristics
- Variable type: FU Ori

Astrometry
Proper motion (μ)	RA: −0.938 mas/yr Dec.: +1.490 mas/yr
Parallax (π)	1.5259±0.2923 mas
Distance	414 pc

Details
Mass	1.29±0.02 M_{☉}
Luminosity (bolometric)	195 L_{☉}
Age	0.5 Myr

Other designations
- V883 Ori, HBC 489

Database references
SIMBAD	data

V883 Orionis is a protostar in the constellation of Orion. It is associated with IC 430 (Haro 13A), a peculiar Hα object surveyed by Guillermo Haro in 1952. It is assumed to be a member of the Orion Nebula cluster at 414±7 pc.

V883 Orionis, like most protostars, is surrounded by a circumstellar disc of dust. The dust has a water snow-line, a certain distance where the stellar irradiance from the star is low enough that water can freeze to snow. The water snow-line was directly imaged by ALMA, when a stellar outburst increased the amount of insolation and pushed the line out farther. In 2023, it was announced that signs of water vapor had been detected in V883 Orionis' disc.

== Gallery ==
Artist's impression of the planet-forming disc around V883 Orionis

Informative video about the planet-forming disc around V883 Orionis

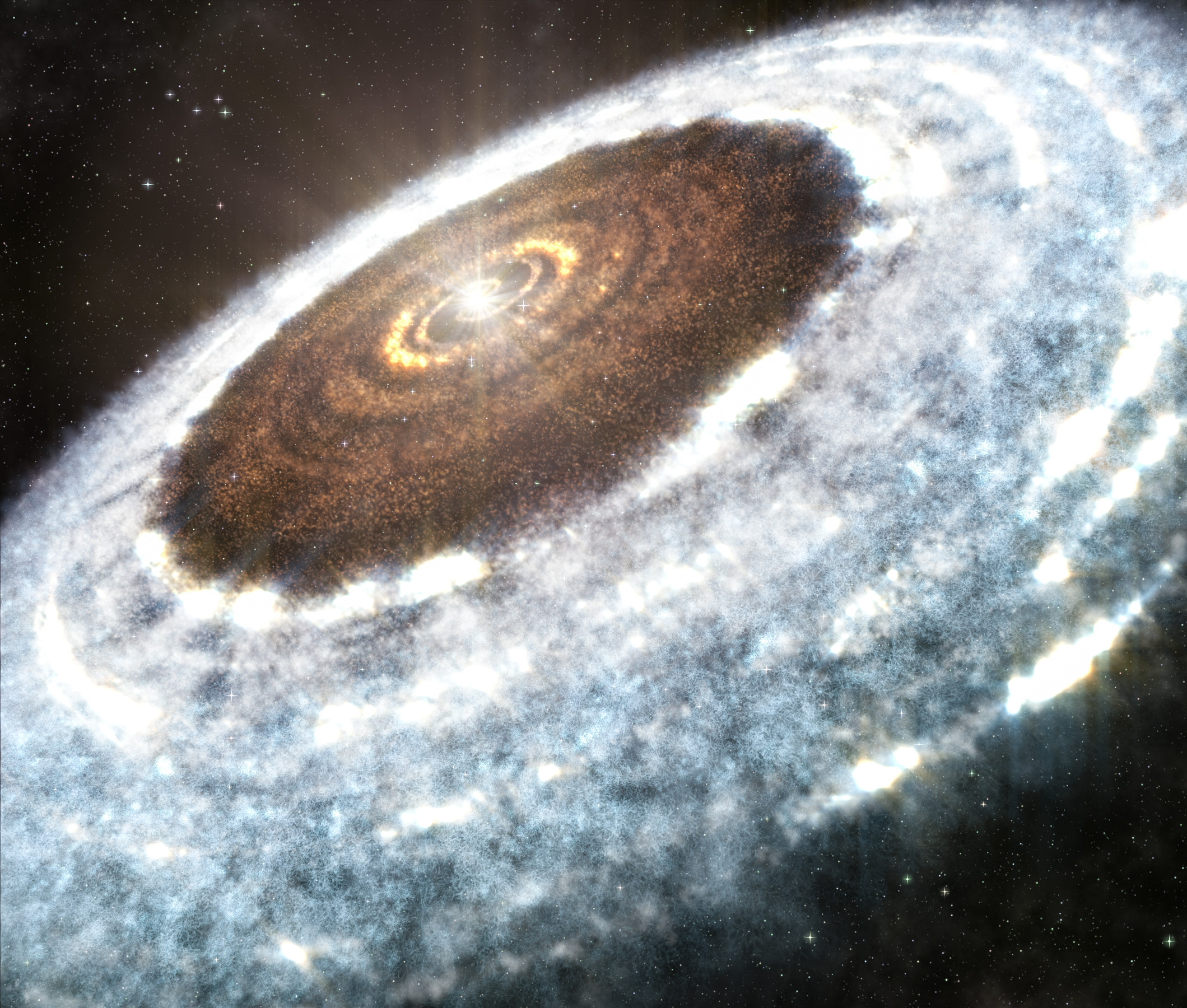
Artist's impression of the water snow line around V883 Orionis, detected with ALMA

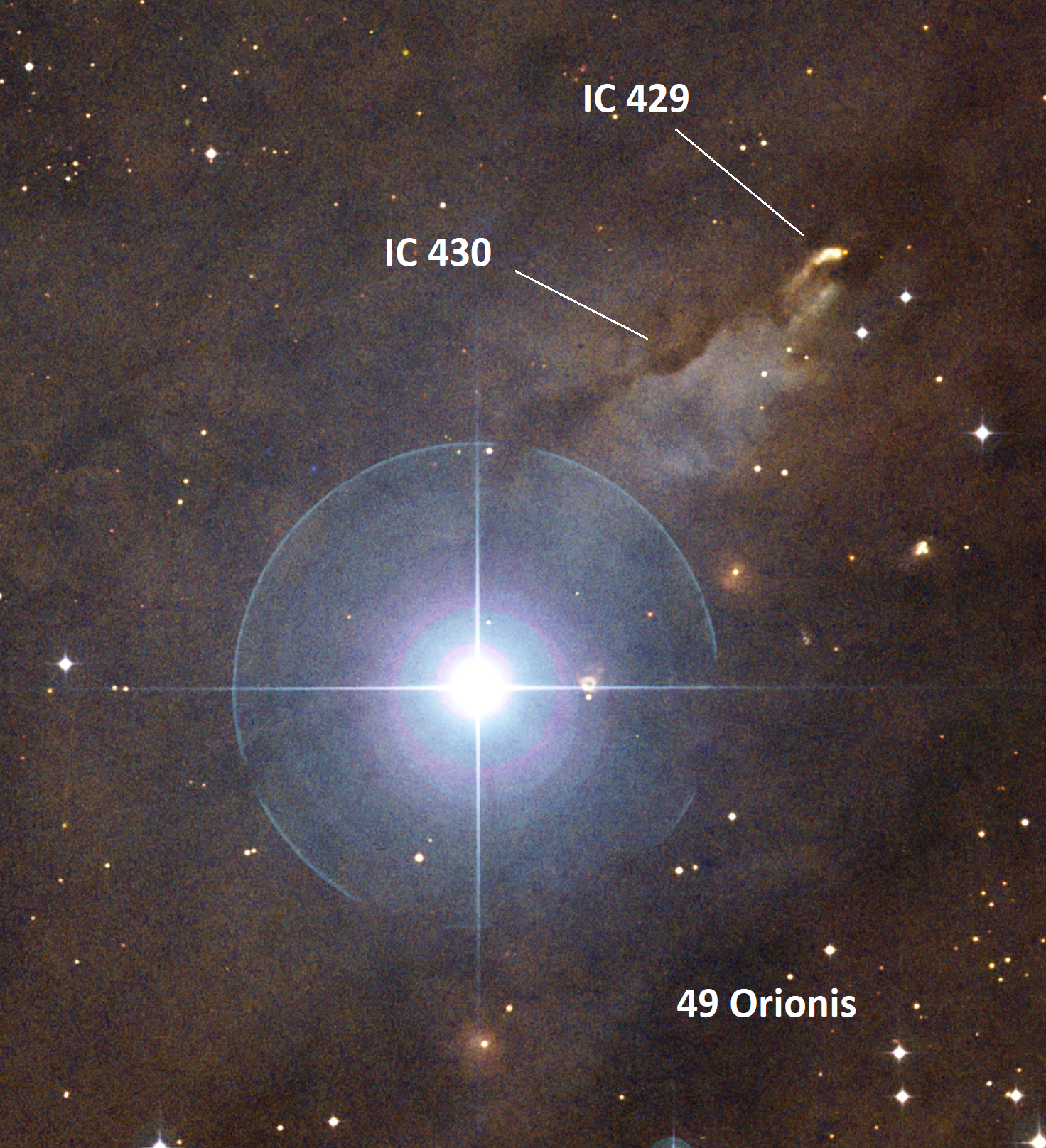
IC 429 and IC 430 next to the bright foreground star 49 Ori. V883 Ori is the faint star just beyond the tip of IC 429.

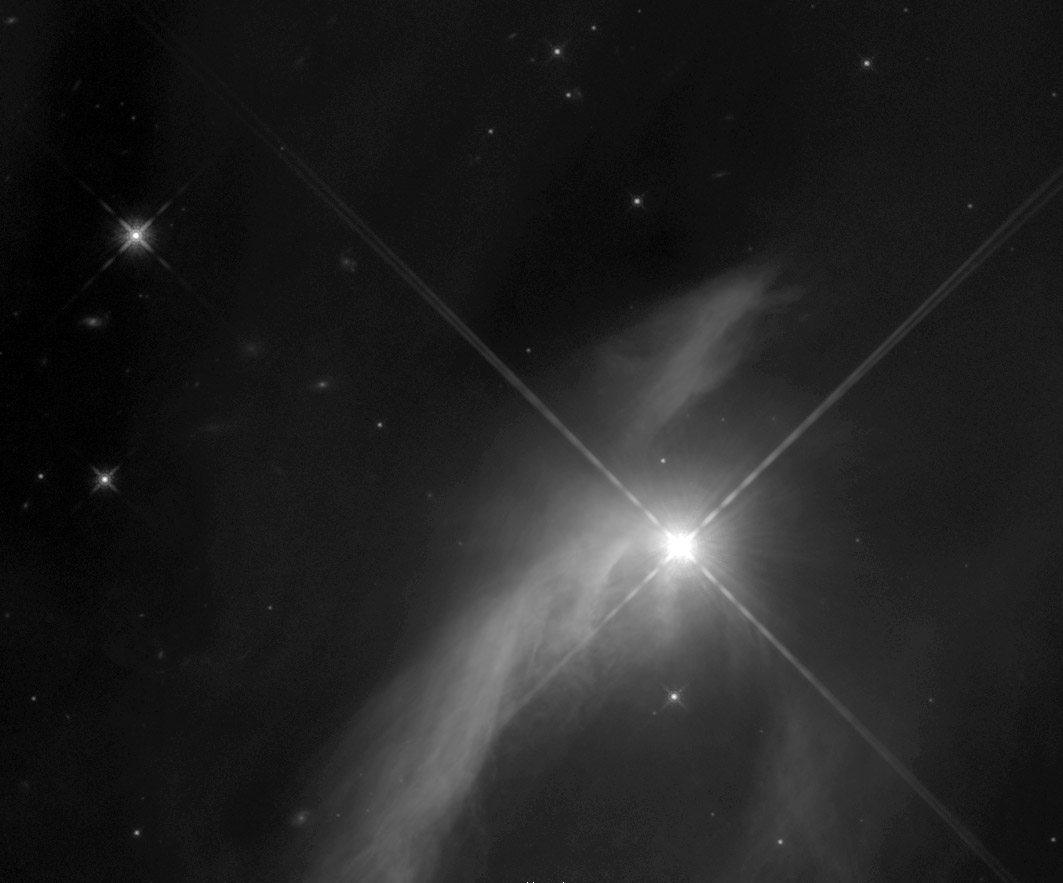
V883 Ori (bright star) and part of IC 429 with the Hubble Space Telescope
