= HH 212 =

Very young Herbig-Haro object

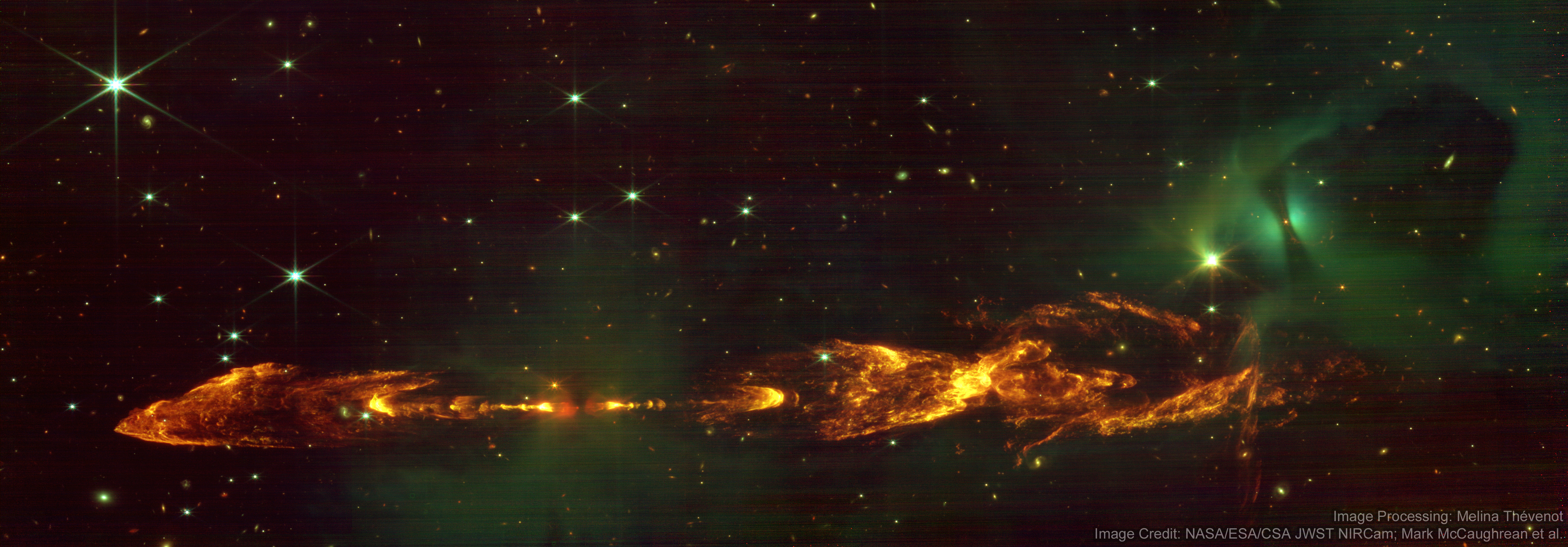
- Image of HH 212 using NIRCAM
- Object type: Herbig-Haro
- Other designations: MHO 499, HH 212

Observation data (Epoch J2000)
- Constellation: Orion
- Right ascension: 5 43 50.64
- Declination: -1° 3' 11.46"
- Distance: 423±15 pc
- Estimated age: 7000 yr
- Notable features: Symmetrical jets

HH 212 is a Herbig–Haro object (HH) located roughly 423 parsecs from Earth in the constellation of Orion, not far from the Flame Nebula. The protostar, which is embedded deep into the center of HH 212 is very young. The high velocities of the symmetrical protostellar jets suggest that the outflows are around 7,000 years old. The high velocity of these jets also create observable bowshocks that trace the path of the outflow jets.

== Jets ==
The protostar IRAS 05413–0104 is emitting large bipolar jets traveling at velocities averaging 170 kilometers per second. These jets show a remarkably symmetric appearance. There appear to be several symmetrical knots appearing on either side of the jet at relatively stable intervals, (roughly 0.01 parsecs) suggesting that it varies regularly over a short timescale of just 30 years. The fast speeds of the jet rams into the interstellar medium creating two main bowshocks. They are located north and south of the jets symmetrically.
