= Five-planet Nice model =

Numerical model of the early Solar System

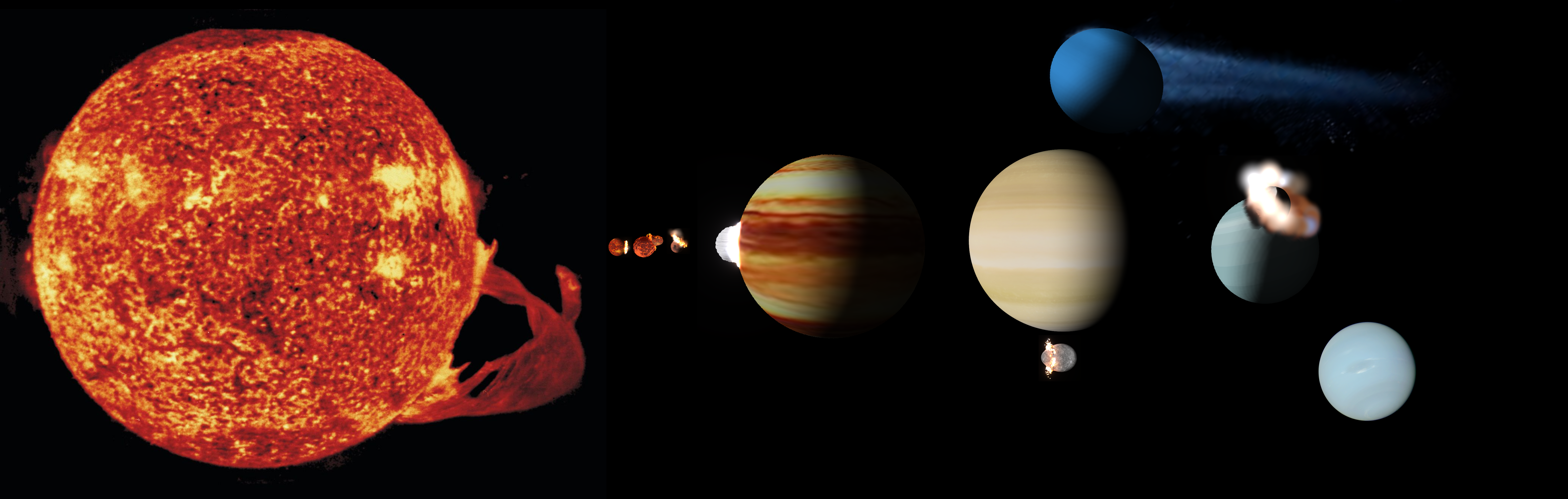
Artist impression of early Solar System

The five-planet Nice model is a numerical model of the early Solar System that is a revised variation of the Nice model. It begins with five giant planets, the four that exist today plus an additional ice giant between Saturn and Uranus in a chain of mean-motion resonances.

After the resonance chain is broken, the five giant planets undergo a period of planetesimal-driven migration, followed by a period of orbital instability with gravitational encounters between planets similar to that in the original Nice model. During the instability the additional giant planet is scattered inward onto a Jupiter-crossing orbit and is ejected from the Solar System following an encounter with Jupiter. The model was first formally proposed in 2011 after simulations indicated that it was more likely to reproduce the current Solar System than a four-planet Nice model.

== A five-planet Nice model ==
The following is a version of the five-planet Nice model that results in an early instability and reproduces a number of aspects of the current Solar System. Although in the past the giant planet instability has been linked to the Late Heavy Bombardment, a number of recent studies indicate that the giant planet instability occurred early. The Solar System may have begun with the giant planets in another resonance chain.

The Solar System ends its nebula phase with Jupiter, Saturn, and the three ice giants in a 3:2, 3:2, 2:1, 3:2 resonance chain with semi-major axes ranging from 5.5 – 20 AU. A dense disk of planetesimals orbits beyond these planets, extending from 24 AU to 30 AU. The planetesimals in this disk are stirred due to gravitational interactions between them, increasing the eccentricities and inclinations of their orbits. The disk spreads as this occurs, pushing its inner edge toward the orbits of the giant planets. Collisions between planetesimals in the outer disk also produce debris that is ground to dust in a cascade of collisions. The dust spirals inward toward the planets due to Poynting-Robertson drag and eventually reaches Neptune's orbit. Gravitational interactions with the dust or with the inward scattered planetesimals allow the giant planets to escape from the resonance chain roughly ten million years after the dissipation of the gas disk.

The planets then undergo a planetesimal-driven migration as they encounter and exchange angular momentum with an increasing number of planetesimals. A net inward transfer of planetesimals and outward migration of Neptune occurs during these encounters as most of those scattered outward return to be encountered again while some of those scattered inward are prevented from returning after encountering Uranus. A similar process occurs for Uranus, the extra ice giant, and Saturn, resulting in their outward migration and a transfer of planetesimals inward from the outer belt to Jupiter. Jupiter, in contrast, ejects most of the planetesimals from the Solar System, and as a result migrates inward. After 10 million years the divergent migration of the planets leads to resonance crossings, exciting the eccentricities of the giant planets and destabilizing the planetary system when Neptune is near 28 AU.

The extra ice giant is ejected during this instability. The extra ice giant enters a Saturn-crossing orbit after its eccentricity increases and is scattered inward by Saturn onto a Jupiter-crossing orbit. Repeated gravitational encounters with the ice giant cause jumps in Jupiter's and Saturn's semi-major axes, driving a step-wise separation of their orbits, and leading to a rapid increase of the ratio of their periods until it is greater than 2.3. The ice giant also encounters Uranus and Neptune and crosses parts of the asteroid belt as these encounters increase the eccentricity and semi-major axis of its orbit. After 10,000–100,000 years, the ice giant is ejected from the Solar System following an encounter with Jupiter, becoming a rogue planet. The remaining planets then continue to migrate at a declining rate and slowly approach their final orbits as most of the remaining planetesimal disk is removed.

== Solar System effects ==
The migrations of the giant planets and encounters between them have many effects in the outer Solar System. The gravitational encounters between the giant planets excite the eccentricities and inclinations of their orbits. The planetesimals scattered inward by Neptune enter planet-crossing orbits where they may impact the planets or their satellites The impacts of these planetesimals leave craters and impact basins on the moons of the outer planets, and may result in the disruption of their inner moons. Some of the planetesimals are jump-captured as Jupiter trojans when Jupiter's semi-major axis jumps during encounters with the ejected ice giant. One group of Jupiter trojans can be depleted relative to the other if the ice giant passes through it following the ice giant's last encounter with Jupiter. Later, when Jupiter and Saturn are near mean-motion resonances, other Jupiter trojans can be captured via the mechanism described in the original Nice model. Other planetesimals are captured as irregular satellites of the giant planets via three-body interactions during encounters between the ejected ice giant and the other planets. The irregular satellites begin with wide range of inclinations including prograde, retrograde, and perpendicular orbits. The population is later reduced as those in perpendicular orbits are lost due to the Kozai mechanism, and others are broken up by collisions among them. The encounters between planets can also perturb the orbits of the regular satellites and may be responsible for the inclination of Iapetus's orbit. Saturn's rotational axis may have been tilted when it slowly crossed a spin-orbit resonance with Neptune.

Many of the planetesimals are also implanted in various orbits beyond Neptune's orbit during its migration. While Neptune migrates outward several AU, the hot classical Kuiper belt and the scattered disk are formed as some planetesimals scattered outward by Neptune are captured in resonances, undergo an exchange of eccentricity vs inclination via the Kozai mechanism, and are released onto higher perihelion, stable orbits. Planetesimals captured in Neptune's sweeping 2:1 resonance during this early migration are released when an encounter with the ice giant causes its semi-major axis to jump outward, leaving behind a group of low-inclination, low-eccentricity objects in the cold classical Kuiper belt with semi-major axes near 44 AU. This process avoids close encounters with Neptune allowing loosely bound binaries, including 'blue' binaries, to survive. An excess of low-inclination plutinos is avoided due to a similar release of objects from Neptune's 3:2 resonance during this encounter. Neptune's modest eccentricity following the encounter, or the rapid precession of its orbit, allows the primordial disk of cold classical Kuiper belt objects to survive. If Neptune's migration is slow enough following this encounter the eccentricity distribution of these objects can be truncated by a sweeping mean-motion resonances, leaving it with a step near Neptune's 7:4 resonance. As Neptune slowly approaches its current orbit, objects are left in fossilized high-perihelion orbits in the scattered disk. Others with perihelia beyond Neptune's orbit but not high enough to avoid interactions with Neptune remain as a scattering objects, and those that remain in resonance at the end of Neptune's migration form the various resonant populations beyond Neptune's orbit. Objects that are scattered to very large semi-major axis orbits can have their perihelia lifted beyond the influences of the giant planets by the galactic tide or perturbations from passing stars, depositing them in the Oort cloud. If the hypothetical Planet Nine was in its proposed orbit at the time of the instability a roughly spherical cloud of objects would be captured with semi-major axes ranging from a few hundred to a few thousand AU.

In the inner Solar System the impacts of the instability vary with its timing and duration. An early instability could have been responsible for the removal of most of the mass from the Mars region, leaving Mars smaller than Earth and Venus. An early instability could also result in the depletion of the asteroid belt, and if it extended for a few hundred thousand years, the excitement of its eccentricities and inclinations. Asteroid collisional families can be dispersed due to interactions with various resonances and by encounters with the ice giant as it crosses the asteroid belt. Planetesimals from the outer belt are embedded in the asteroid belt as P- and D-type asteroids when their aphelion are lowered below Jupiter's orbit while they are in a resonance or during encounters with the ice giant, with some reaching the inner asteroid belt due to encounters with the ice giant. A late instability would have to be brief, driving a rapid separation of the orbits of Jupiter and Saturn, to avoid the excitation of the eccentricities of the inner planets due to secular resonance sweeping. This would also lead to more modest changes in the asteroid's orbits if the asteroid belt had an initial low mass, or if it had been depleted and excited by the Grand Tack, possibly shifting the distribution of their eccentricities toward the current distribution. A late instability could also result in roughly half of the asteroids escaping from the core of a previously depleted asteroid belt (less than in the original Nice model) leading to a smaller, but extended bombardment of the inner planets by rocky objects when an inner extension of the asteroid belt is disrupted when the planets reach their present positions.

== Development of the Nice model ==
=== Four planet models ===
Current theories of planetary formation do not allow for the accretion of Uranus and Neptune in their present positions. The protoplanetary disk was too diffuse and the time scales too long for them to form via planetesimal accretion before the gas disk dissipated, and numerical models indicate that later accretion would be halted once Pluto-sized planetesimals formed. Although more recent models including pebble accretion allow for faster growth the inward migration of the planets due to interactions with the gas disk leave them in closer orbits.

It is now widely accepted that the Solar System was initially more compact and that the outer planets migrated outward to their current positions. The planetesimal-driven migration of the outer planets was first described in 1984 by Fernandez and Ip. This process is driven by the exchange of angular momentum between the planets and planetesimals originating from an outer disk. Early dynamical models assumed that this migration was smooth. In addition to reproducing the current positions of the outer planets, these models offered explanations for: the populations of resonant objects in the Kuiper belt, the eccentricity of Pluto's orbit, the inclinations of the hot classical Kuiper belt objects and the retention of a scattered disk, and the low mass of Kuiper belt and the location of its outer edge near the 2:1 resonance with Neptune. However, these models failed to reproduce the eccentricities of the outer planets, leaving them with very small eccentricities at the end of the migration.

In the original Nice model Jupiter and Saturn's eccentricities are excited when they cross their 2:1 resonance, destabilizing the outer Solar System. A series of gravitational encounters ensues during which Uranus and Neptune are scattered outward into the planetesimal disk. There they scatter a great number of planetesimals inward, accelerating the migration of the planets. The scattering of planetesimals and the sweeping of resonances through the asteroid belt produce a bombardment of the inner planets. In addition to reproducing the positions and eccentricities of the outer planets, the original Nice model provided for the origin of: the Jupiter trojans, and the Neptune trojans; the irregular satellites of Saturn, Uranus, and Neptune; the various populations of trans-Neptunian objects; the magnitude of, and with the right initial conditions, the timing of the Late Heavy Bombardment.

However, sweeping secular resonances would perturb the orbits of inner Solar System objects if Jupiter's migration was slow and smooth. The ν_{5} secular resonance crosses the orbits of the terrestrial planets exciting their eccentricities. While Jupiter and Saturn slowly approach their 2:1 resonance the eccentricity of Mars reaches values that can result in collisions between planets or in Mars being ejected from the Solar System. Revised versions of the Nice model beginning with the planets in a chain of resonances avoid this slow approach to the 2:1 resonance. However, the eccentricities of Venus and Mercury are typically excited beyond their current values when the ν_{5} secular resonance crosses their orbits. The orbits of the asteroids are also significantly altered: the ν_{16} secular resonance excites inclinations and the ν_{6} secular resonance excites eccentricities, removing low-inclination asteroids, as they sweep across the asteroid belt. As a result, the surviving asteroid belt is left with a larger fraction of high inclination objects than is currently observed.

The orbits of the inner planets and the orbital distribution of the asteroid belt can be reproduced if Jupiter encounters one of the ice giants, accelerating its migration. The slow resonance crossings that excite the eccentricities of Venus and Mercury and alter the orbital distribution of the asteroids occur when Saturn's period was between 2.1 and 2.3 times that of Jupiter's. Theorists propose that these were avoided because the divergent migration of Jupiter and Saturn was dominated by planet–planet scattering at that time. Specifically, one of the ice giants was scattered inward onto a Jupiter-crossing orbit by a gravitational encounter with Saturn, after which it was scattered outward by a gravitational encounter with Jupiter. As a result, Jupiter's and Saturn's orbits rapidly diverged, accelerating the sweeping of the secular resonances. This evolution of the orbits of the giant planets, similar to processes described by exoplanet researchers, is referred to as the jumping-Jupiter scenario.

=== Ejected planet ===
The encounters between the ice giant and Jupiter in the jumping-Jupiter scenario often lead to the ejection of the ice giant. For this ice giant to be retained its eccentricity must be damped by dynamical friction with the planetesimal disk, raising its perihelion beyond Saturn's orbit. The planetesimal disk masses typically used in the Nice model are often insufficient for this, leaving systems beginning with four giant planets with only three at the end of the instability. The ejection of the ice giant can be avoided if the disk mass is larger, but the separation of Jupiter and Saturn often grows too large and their eccentricities become too small as the larger disk is cleared. These problems led David Nesvorný of the Southwest Research Institute to propose that the Solar System began with five giant planets, with an additional Neptune-mass planet between Saturn and Uranus. Using thousands of simulations with a variety of initial conditions he found that the simulations beginning with five giant planets were ten times more likely to reproduce the orbits of the outer planets. A follow-up study by David Nesvorný and Alessandro Morbidelli found that the required jump in the ratio of Jupiter's and Saturn's periods occurred and the orbits of the outer planets were reproduced in 5% of simulations for one five-planet system vs less than 1% for four-planet systems. The most successful began with a significant migration of Neptune, disrupting the planetesimal disk, before planetary encounters were triggered by resonance crossing. This reduces secular friction, allowing Jupiter's eccentricity to be preserved after it is excited by resonance crossings and planetary encounters.

Konstantin Batygin, Michael E. Brown, and Hayden Betts, in contrast, found four- and five-planet systems had a similar likelihoods (4% vs 3%) of reproducing the orbits of the outer planets, including the oscillations of Jupiter's and Saturn's eccentricities, and the hot and cold populations of Kuiper belt. In their investigations Neptune's orbit was required to have a high eccentricity phase during which the hot population was implanted. A rapid precession of Neptune's orbit during this period due to interactions with Uranus was also necessary for the preservation of a primordial belt of cold classical objects. For a five-planet system they found that the low eccentricities of the cold classical belt were best preserved if the fifth giant planet was ejected in 10,000 years. Since their study examined only the outer Solar System, it did not include a requirement that Jupiter's and Saturn's orbits diverged rapidly as would be necessary to reproduce the current inner Solar System, however.

A number of previous works also modeled Solar Systems with extra giant planets. A study by Thommes, Bryden, Wu, and Rasio included simulations of four and five planets beginning in resonant chains. Loose resonant chains of four or five planets with Jupiter and Saturn beginning in a 2:1 resonance often resulted in the loss of an ice giant for small mass planetesimal disks. The loss of a planet was avoided in four planet systems with a larger planetesimal disk but no scattering of planets occurred. A more compact system with Jupiter and Saturn in a 3:2 resonance sometimes resulted in encounters occurring between Jupiter and Saturn. A study by Morbidelli, Tsiganis, Crida, Levison, and Gomes was more successful in reproducing the Solar System beginning with a four planet system in a compact resonant chain. They also modeled the capture of planets in a five planet resonant chain and noted the planets had larger eccentricities and the system became unstable within 30 Myr. Ford and Chiang modeled systems of planets in a packed oligarchy, the result of their formation in a more massive dynamically cool disk. They found that the extra planets would be ejected as the density of the primordial disk declined. Simulations by Levison and Morbidelli, in contrast, showed that the planets in such systems would spread out rather than be ejected.

=== Initial conditions ===
The giant planets begin in a chain of resonances. During their formation in the protoplanetary disk, interactions between the giant planets and the gas disk caused them to migrate inward toward the Sun. Jupiter's inward migration continued until it was halted, or reversed, as in the Grand Tack model, when it captured a faster migrating Saturn in a mean-motion resonance. The resonance chain was extended as the three ice giants also migrated inward and were captured in further resonances. A long-range migration of Neptune outward into the planetesimal disk before planetary encounters begins is most likely if the planets were captured in a 3:2, 3:2, 2:1, 3:2 resonance chain, occurring in 65% of simulations when the inner edge was within 2 AU. While this resonance chain has the highest likelihood of reproducing Neptune's migration other resonance chains are also possible if the instability occurred early.

A late instability may have followed an extended period of slow dust-driven migration. The combination of a late escape from a resonance chain, as described in the Nice 2 model, and a long-range migration of Neptune is unlikely. If the inner edge of the planetesimal disk is close an early escape from resonance occurs, if it is distant an instability typically triggered before a significant migration of Neptune occurs. This gap may be bridged if an early escape from resonance is followed by an extended period of slow dust-driven migration. Resonance chains other than the 3:2, 3:2, 2:1, 3:2 are unlikely in this case. Instabilities occur during the slow migration for tighter resonance chains and the distant disk is unrealistically narrow for more relaxed resonance chains. The rate of dust-driven migration slows with time as the rate of dust generation declines. As a result, the timing of the instability is sensitive to factors that determine the rate of dust generation such as the size distribution and the strength of the planetesimals.

=== Timing of the instability ===
The timing of the instability in the Nice model was initially proposed to have coincided with the Late Heavy Bombardment, a spike in the impact rate thought to have occurred several hundred million years after the formation of the Solar System. However, recently a number of issues have been raised regarding the timing of the Nice model instability, whether it was the cause of the Late Heavy Bombardment, and if an alternative would better explain the associated craters and impact basins. Most of the effects of the Nice model instability on the orbits of the giant planets and those of the various small body populations that originated in the outer planetesimal disk are independent of its timing, however.

A five-planet Nice model with a late instability has a low probability of reproducing the orbits of the terrestrial planets. Jupiter's and Saturn's period ratio makes the jump from less than 2.1 to greater than 2.3 required to avoid secular resonance crossings in a small fraction of simulations (7%–8.7%) and the eccentricities of the terrestrial planets can also be excited when Jupiter encounters the ice giant. In a study by Nathan Kaib and John Chambers this resulted in the orbits of the terrestrial planets being reproduced in a few percent of simulation with only 1% reproducing both the terrestrial and giant planets orbits. This led Kaib and Chambers to propose that the instability occurred early, before the formation of the terrestrial planets. However, a jump in the ratio of the orbital periods of Jupiter and Saturn is still required to reproduce the asteroid belt, reducing the advantage of an early instability. A previous study by Ramon Brasser, Kevin Walsh, and David Nesvorny found a reasonable chance (greater than 20%) of reproducing the inner Solar System using a selected five-planet model. The shapes of the impact basins on Iapetus are also consistent with a late bombardment.

Sufficient mass may not remain in the planetesimal disk after 400 million years of collisional grinding to fit models of the instability. If the size distribution of the planetesimal disk initially resembled its current distribution and included thousands of Pluto mass objects significant mass loss occurs. This leaves the disk with under 10 Earth masses, while a minimum of 15 Earth masses is needed in current models of the instability. The size distribution also becomes shallower than is observed. These problems remain even if simulations begin with a more massive disk or a steeper size distribution. In contrast, a much lower mass loss and little change in the size distribution occurs during an early instability. If the planetesimal disk began without Pluto mass objects collisional grinding would begin as they formed from smaller object, with the timing depending on the initial size of the objects and mass of the planetesimal disk.

Binary objects such as Patroclus–Menoetius would be separated due to the collisions if the instability was late. Patroclus and Menoetius are a pair of ~100 km objects orbiting with a separation of 680 km and relative velocities of ~11 m/s. While this binary remains in a massive planetesimal disk it is vulnerable to being separated due to collision. Roughly ~90% of similar binaries are separated per hundred million years in simulations and after 400 million years its survival probabilities falls to 7 × 10^{−5}. The presence of Patroclus–Menoetius among the Jupiter Trojans requires that the giant planet instability occurred within 100 million years of the formation of the Solar System.

Interactions between Pluto-massed objects in the outer planetesimal disk can result in an early instability. Gravitational interactions between the largest planetesimals dynamically heat the disk, increasing the eccentricities of their orbits. The increased eccentricities also lower their perihelion distances causing some of them to enter orbits that cross that of the outer giant planet. Gravitational interactions between the planetesimals and the planet allow it to escape from the resonance chain and drive its outward migration. In simulations this often leads to resonance crossings and an instability within 100 million years.

The bombardment produced by the Nice model may not match the Late Heavy Bombardment. An impactor size distribution similar to the asteroids would result in too many large impact basins relative to smaller craters. The innermost asteroid belt would need a different size distribution, perhaps due to its small asteroids being the result of collisions between a small number of large asteroids, to match this constraint. While the Nice model predicts a bombardment by both asteroids and comets, most evidence (although not all) points toward a bombardment dominated by asteroids. This may reflect the reduced cometary bombardment in the five-planet Nice model and the significant mass loss or the break-up of comets after entering the inner Solar System, potentially allowing the evidence of cometary bombardment to have been lost. However, two recent estimates of the asteroid bombardment find it is also insufficient to explain the Late Heavy Bombardment. Reproducing the lunar craters and impact basins identified with the Late Heavy Bombardment, about 1/6 of the craters larger than 15 km in diameter, and the craters on Mars may be possible if a different crater-scaling law is used. The remaining lunar craters would then be the result of another population of impactors with a different size distribution, possibly planetesimals left over from the formation of the planets. This crater-scaling law also is more successful at reproducing the more recently formed large craters.

The craters and impact basins identified with the Late Heavy Bombardment may have another cause. Some recently offered alternatives include debris from the impact that formed the Borealis Basin on Mars, and catastrophic collisions among lost planets once orbiting inside Mercury. These explanations have their own potential problems, for example, the timing of the formation of the Borealis basin, and whether objects should remain on orbits inside Mercury's. A monotonically declining bombardment by planetesimals left over from the formation of the terrestrial planets has also been proposed. This hypothesis requires the lunar mantle to have crystallized relatively late which may explain the differing concentrations of highly siderophile elements in the Earth and Moon. A previous work, however, found that the most dynamically stable part of this population would become depleted due to its collisional evolution, making the formation of several or even the last two impact basins unlikely.

== Proposed names ==
According to Nesvorný, colleagues have suggested several names for the hypothetical fifth giant planet—Hades, after the Greek god of the underworld; Liber, after the Roman god of wine and a cognate of Dionysus and Bacchus; and Mephitis, after the Roman goddess of toxic gases. Another suggestion is "Thing 1" from Dr. Seuss's The Cat in the Hat children's book. However, Nesvorný himself does not like such suggestions.

== Notes on Planet Nine ==
In January 2016, Batygin and Brown proposed that a distant massive ninth planet is responsible for the alignment of the perihelia of several trans-Neptunian objects with semi-major axes greater than 250 AU. And in November 2017, Brown stated in a reply to a Twitter inquiry about the correlation between the five-planet Nice model and Planet Nine "i'd [sic] say it's a good chance that Planet Nine is Nice planet #5". While the mechanism for the ejection of the fifth giant planet in the five-planet Nice model is reminiscent of the origin of Planet Nine, with a gravitational instability including an encounter with Jupiter, other origins have been proposed. Examples include capture from another star, and in situ formation followed by its orbit being altered by a passing star.
