= Jumping-Jupiter scenario =

Scenario of giant planet migration

The jumping-Jupiter scenario specifies an evolution of giant-planet migration described by the Nice model, in which an ice giant (an additional Neptune-mass planet) is scattered inward by Saturn and then ejected by Jupiter, causing their semi-major axes to jump, and thereby quickly separating their orbits. The jumping-Jupiter scenario was proposed by Ramon Brasser, Alessandro Morbidelli, Rodney Gomes, Kleomenis Tsiganis, and Harold Levison after their studies revealed that the smooth divergent migration of Jupiter and Saturn resulted in an inner Solar System significantly different from the current Solar System. During this migration secular resonances swept through the inner Solar System exciting the orbits of the terrestrial planets and the asteroids, leaving the planets' orbits too eccentric, and the asteroid belt with too many high-inclination objects. The jumps in the semi-major axes of Jupiter and Saturn described in the jumping-Jupiter scenario can allow these resonances to quickly cross the inner Solar System without altering orbits excessively, although the terrestrial planets remain sensitive to its passage.

The jumping-Jupiter scenario also results in a number of other differences with the original Nice model. The fraction of lunar impactors from the core of the asteroid belt during the Late Heavy Bombardment is significantly reduced, most of the Jupiter trojans are captured during Jupiter's encounters with the ice giant, as are Jupiter's irregular satellites. In the jumping-Jupiter scenario, the likelihood of preserving four giant planets on orbits resembling their current ones appears to increase if the early Solar System originally contained an additional ice giant, which was later ejected by Jupiter into interstellar space. However, this remains an atypical result, as is the preservation of the current orbits of the terrestrial planets.

== Background ==
=== Original Nice model ===
In the original Nice model a resonance crossing results in a dynamical instability that rapidly alters the orbits of the giant planets. The original Nice model begins with the giant planets in a compact configuration with nearly circular orbits. Initially, interactions with planetesimals originating in an outer disk drive a slow divergent migration of the giant planets. This planetesimal-driven migration continues until Jupiter and Saturn cross their mutual 2:1 resonance. The resonance crossing excites the eccentricities of Jupiter and Saturn. The increased eccentricities create perturbations on Uranus and Neptune, increasing their eccentricities until the system becomes chaotic and orbits begin to intersect. Gravitational encounters between the planets then scatter Uranus and Neptune outward into the planetesimal disk. The disk is disrupted, scattering many of the planetesimals onto planet-crossing orbits. A rapid phase of divergent migration of the giant planets is initiated and continues until the disk is depleted. Dynamical friction during this phase dampens the eccentricities of Uranus and Neptune stabilizing the system. In numerical simulations of the original Nice model the final orbits of the giant planets are similar to the current Solar System.

=== Resonant planetary orbits ===
Later versions of the Nice model begin with the giant planets in a series of resonances. This change reflects some hydrodynamic models of the early Solar System. In these models, interactions between the giant planets and the gas disk result in the giant planets migrating toward the central star, in some cases becoming hot Jupiters. However, in a multiple-planet system, this inward migration may be halted or reversed if a more rapidly migrating smaller planet is captured in an outer orbital resonance. The Grand Tack hypothesis, which posits that Jupiter's migration is reversed at 1.5 AU following the capture of Saturn in a resonance, is an example of this type of orbital evolution. The resonance in which Saturn is captured, a 3:2 or a 2:1 resonance, and the extent of the outward migration (if any) depends on the physical properties of the gas disk and the amount of gas accreted by the planets. The capture of Uranus and Neptune into further resonances during or following this outward migration results in a quadruply resonant system, with several stable combinations having been identified. Following the dissipation of the gas disk, the quadruple resonance is eventually broken due to interactions with planetesimals from the outer disk. Evolution from this point resembles the original Nice model with an instability beginning either shortly after the quadruple resonance is broken or after a delay during which planetesimal-driven migration drives the planets across a different resonance. However, there is no slow approach to the 2:1 resonance as Jupiter and Saturn either begin in this resonance or cross it rapidly during the instability.

=== Late escape from resonance ===
The stirring of the outer disk by massive planetesimals can trigger a late instability in a multi-resonant planetary system. As the eccentricities of the planetesimals are excited by gravitational encounters with Pluto-mass objects, an inward migration of the giant planets occurs. The migration, which occurs even if there are no encounters between planetesimals and planets, is driven by a coupling between the average eccentricity of the planetesimal disk and the semi-major axes of the outer planets. Because the planets are locked in resonance, the migration also results in an increase in the eccentricity of the inner ice giant. The increased eccentricity changes the precession frequency of the inner ice giant, leading to the crossing of secular resonances. The quadruple resonance of the outer planets can be broken during one of these secular-resonance crossings. Gravitational encounters begin shortly afterward due to the close proximity of the planets in the previously resonant configuration. The timing of the instability caused by this mechanism, typically occurring several hundred million years after the dispersal of the gas disk, is fairly independent of the distance between the outer planet and the planetesimal disk. In combination with the updated initial conditions, this alternative mechanism for triggering a late instability has been called the Nice 2 model.

=== Planetary encounters with Jupiter ===
Encounters between Jupiter and an ice giant during the giant planet migration are required to reproduce the current Solar System. In a series of three articles Ramon Brasser, Alessandro Morbidelli, Rodney Gomes, Kleomenis Tsiganis, and Harold Levison analyzed the orbital evolution of the Solar System during giant planet migration. The first article demonstrated that encounters between an ice giant and at least one gas giant were required to reproduce the oscillations of the eccentricities of the gas giants. The other two demonstrated that if Jupiter and Saturn underwent a smooth planetesimal-driven separation of their orbits the terrestrial planets would have orbits that are too eccentric and too many of the asteroids would have orbits with large inclinations. They proposed that the ice giant encountered both Jupiter and Saturn, causing the rapid separation of their orbits, thereby avoiding the secular resonance sweeping responsible for the excitation of orbits in the inner Solar System.

Exciting the oscillations of the eccentricities of the giant planets requires encounters between planets. Jupiter and Saturn have modest eccentricities that oscillate out of phase, with Jupiter reaching maximum eccentricity when Saturn reaches its minimum and vice versa. A smooth migration of the giant planets without resonance crossings results in very small eccentricities. Resonance crossings excite their mean eccentricities, with the 2:1 resonance crossing reproducing Jupiter's current eccentricity, but these do not generate the oscillations in their eccentricities. Recreating both requires either a combination of resonance crossings and an encounter between Saturn and an ice giant, or multiple encounters of an ice giant with one or both gas giants.

During the smooth migration of the giant planets the ν5 secular resonance sweeps through the inner Solar System, exciting the eccentricities of the terrestrial planets. When planets are in a secular resonance the precessions of their orbits are synchronized, keeping their relative orientations and the average torques exerted between them fixed. The torques transfer angular momentum between the planets causing changes in their eccentricities and, if the orbits are inclined relative to one another, their inclinations. If the planets remain in or near secular resonances these changes can accumulate resulting in significant changes in eccentricity and inclination. During a ν5 secular resonance crossing this can result in the excitation of the terrestrial planet's eccentricity, with the magnitude of the increase depending on the eccentricity of Jupiter and the time spent in the secular resonance. For the original Nice model the slow approach to Jupiter's and Saturn's 2:1 resonance results in an extended interaction of the ν5 secular resonance with Mars, driving its eccentricity to levels that can destabilize the inner Solar System, potentially leading to collisions between planets or the ejection of Mars. In later versions of the Nice model Jupiter's and Saturn's divergent migration across (or from) the 2:1 resonance is more rapid and the nearby ν5 resonance crossings of Earth and Mars are brief, thus avoiding the excessive excitation of their eccentricities in some cases. Venus and Mercury, however, reach significantly higher eccentricities than are observed when the ν5 resonance later crosses their orbits.

A smooth planetesimal-driven migration of the giant planets also results in an asteroid belt orbital distribution unlike that of the current asteroid belt. As it sweeps across the asteroid belt the ν16 secular resonance excites asteroid inclinations. It is followed by the ν6 secular resonance which excites the eccentricities of low-inclination asteroids. If the secular resonance sweeping occurs during a planetesimal driven migration, which has a timescale of 5 million years or longer, the remaining asteroid belt is left with a significant fraction of asteroids with inclinations greater than 20°, which are relatively rare in the current asteroid belt. The interaction of the ν6 secular resonance with the 3:1 mean-motion resonance also leaves a prominent clump in the semi-major-axis distribution that is not observed. The secular resonance sweeping would also leave too many high inclination asteroids if the giant planet migration occurred early, with all of the asteroids initially in low eccentricity and inclination orbits, and also if the orbits of the asteroids were excited by Jupiter's passage during the Grand Tack.

Encounters between an ice giant and both Jupiter and Saturn accelerate the separation of their orbits, limiting the effects of secular resonance sweeping on the orbits of the terrestrial planets and the asteroids. To prevent the excitation of orbits of the terrestrial planets and asteroids the secular resonances must sweep rapidly through the inner Solar System. The small eccentricity of Venus indicates that this occurred on a timescale of less than 150,000 years, much shorter than in a planetesimal driven migration. The secular resonance sweeping can be largely avoided, however, if the separation of Jupiter and Saturn was driven by gravitational encounters with an ice giant. These encounters must drive the Jupiter–Saturn period ratio quickly from below 2.1 to beyond 2.3, the range where the secular resonance crossings occur. This evolution of the giant planets orbits has been named the jumping-Jupiter scenario after a similar process proposed to explain the eccentric orbits of some exoplanets.

== Description ==
The jumping-Jupiter scenario replaces the smooth separation of Jupiter and Saturn with a series of jumps, thereby avoiding the sweeping of secular resonances through the inner Solar System as their period ratio crosses from 2.1 to 2.3. In the jumping-Jupiter scenario an ice giant is scattered inward by Saturn onto a Jupiter-crossing orbit and then scattered outward by Jupiter. Saturn's semi-major axis is increased in the first gravitational encounter and Jupiter's reduced by the second with the net result being an increase in their period ratio. In numerical simulations the process can be much more complex: while the trend is for Jupiter's and Saturn's orbits to separate, depending on the geometry of the encounters, individual jumps of Jupiter's and Saturn's semi-major axes can be either up and down. In addition to numerous encounters with Jupiter and Saturn, the ice giant can encounter other ice giant(s) and in some cases cross significant parts of the asteroid belt. The gravitational encounters occur over a period of 10,000–100,000 years, and end when dynamical friction with the planetesimal disk dampens the ice giant's eccentricity, raising its perihelion beyond Saturn's orbit; or when the ice giant is ejected from the Solar System. A jumping-Jupiter scenario occurs in a subset of numerical simulations of the Nice model, including some done for the original Nice model paper. The chances of Saturn scattering an ice giant onto a Jupiter-crossing orbit increases when the initial Saturn–ice giant distance is less than 3 AU, and with the 35-Earth-mass planetesimal belt used in the original Nice model, typically results in the ejection of the ice giant.

== Fifth giant planet ==
The frequent loss of the giant planet encountering Jupiter in simulations has led some to propose that the early Solar System began with five giant planets. In numerical simulations of the jumping-Jupiter scenario the ice giant is often ejected following its gravitational encounters with Jupiter and Saturn, leaving planetary systems that begin with four giant planets with only three. Although beginning with a higher-mass planetesimal disk was found to stabilize four-planet systems, the massive disk either resulted in excess migration of Jupiter and Saturn after the encounters between an ice giant and Jupiter or prevented these encounters by damping eccentricities. This problem led David Nesvorný to investigate planetary systems beginning with five giant planets. After conducting thousands of simulations he reported that simulations beginning with five giant planets were 10 times as likely to reproduce the current orbits of the outer planets. A follow-up study by Nesvorny and Alessandro Morbidelli sought initial resonant configurations that would reproduce the semi-major axis of the four outer planets, Jupiter's eccentricity, and a jump from <2.1 to >2.3 in Jupiter's and Saturn's period ratio. While less than 1% of the best four-planet models met these criteria roughly 5% of the best five-planet models were judged successful, with Jupiter's eccentricity being the most difficult to reproduce. A separate study by Konstantin Batygin and Michael E. Brown found similar probabilities (4% vs 3%) of reproducing the current outer Solar System beginning with four or five giant planets using the best initial conditions. Their simulations differed in that the planetesimal disk was placed close to the outer planet resulting in a period of migration before planetary encounters began. Criteria included reproducing the oscillations of Jupiter's and Saturn's eccentricities, a period when Neptune's eccentricity exceeded 0.2 during which hot classical Kuiper belt objects were captured, and the retention of a primordial cold classical Kuiper belt, but not the jump in Jupiter's and Saturn's period ratio. Their results also indicate that if Neptune's eccentricity exceeded 0.2, preserving a cold classical belt may require the ice giant to be ejected in as little as 10,000 years.

== Migration of Neptune before instability ==
Neptune's migration into the planetesimal disk before planetary encounters begin allows Jupiter to retain a significant eccentricity and limits its migration after the ejection of the fifth ice giant. Jupiter's eccentricity is excited by resonance crossings and gravitational encounters with the ice giant and is damped due to secular friction with the planetesimal disk. Secular friction occurs when the orbit of a planet suddenly changes and results in the excitation of the planetesimals' orbits and the reduction of the planet's eccentricity and inclination as the system relaxes. If gravitational encounters begin shortly after the planets leave their multi-resonant configuration, this leaves Jupiter with a small eccentricity. However, if Neptune first migrates outward disrupting the planetesimal disk, its mass is reduced and the eccentricities and inclinations of the planetesimals are excited. When planetary encounters are later triggered by a resonance crossing this lessens the impact of secular friction allowing Jupiter's eccentricity to be maintained. The smaller mass of the disk also reduces the divergent migration of Jupiter and Saturn following the ejection of the fifth planet. This can allow Jupiter's and Saturn's period ratio to jump beyond 2.3 during the planetary encounters without exceeding the current value once the planetesimal disk is removed. Although this evolution of the outer planet's orbits can reproduce the current Solar System, it is not the typical result in simulations that begin with a significant distance between the outer planet and the planetesimal disk as in the Nice 2 model. An extended migration of Neptune into the planetesimal disk before planetary encounters begin can occur if the disk's inner edge was within 2 AU of Neptune's orbit. This migration begins soon after the protoplanetary disk dissipates, resulting in an early instability, and is most likely if the giant planets began in a 3:2, 3:2, 2:1, 3:2 resonance chain.

A late instability can occur if Neptune first underwent a slow dust-driven migration towards a more distant planetesimal disk. For a five planet system to remain stable for 400 million years the inner edge of the planetesimal disk must be several AU beyond Neptune's initial orbit. Collisions between planetesimals in this disk creates debris that is ground down to dust in a collisional cascade. The dust drifts inward due to Poynting–Robertson drag, eventually reaching the orbits of the giant planets. Gravitational interactions with the dust causes the giant planets to escape from their resonance chain roughly 10 million years after the dissipation of the gas disk. The gravitational interactions then result in a slow dust-driven migration of the planets until Neptune approaches the inner edge of the disk. A more rapid planetesimal-driven migration of Neptune into the disk then ensues until the orbits of the planets are destabilized following a resonance crossing. The dust driven migration requires 7–22 Earth-masses of dust, depending on the initial distance between Neptune's orbit and the inner edge of the dust disk. The rate of the dust-driven migration slows with time as the amount of dust the planets encounters declines. As a result, the timing of the instability is sensitive to the factors that control the rate of dust generation such as the size distribution and the strength of the planetesimals.

== Implications for the early Solar System ==
The jumping-Jupiter scenario results in a number of differences with the original Nice model.

The rapid separation of Jupiter's and Saturn's orbits causes the secular resonances to quickly cross the inner Solar System. The number of asteroids removed from the core of the asteroid belt is reduced, leaving an inner extension of the asteroid belt as the dominant source of rocky impactors. The likelihood of preserving the low eccentricities of the terrestrial planets increases to above 20% in a selected jumping-Jupiter model. Since the modification of orbits in the asteroid belt is limited, its depletion and the excitement of its orbits must have occurred earlier. However, asteroid orbits are modified enough to shift the orbital distribution produced by a grand tack toward that of the current asteroid belt, to disperse collisional families, and to remove fossil Kirkwood gaps. The ice giant crossing the asteroid belt allows some icy planetesimals to be implanted into the inner asteroid belt.

In the outer Solar System icy planetesimals are captured as Jupiter trojans when Jupiter's semi-major axis jumps during encounters with the ice giant. Jupiter also captures irregular satellites via three body interactions during these encounters. The orbits of Jupiter's regular satellites are perturbed, but in roughly half of simulations remain in orbits similar to those observed. Encounters between an ice giant and Saturn perturb the orbit of Iapetus and may be responsible for its inclination. The dynamical excitement of the outer disk by Pluto-massed objects and its lower mass reduces the bombardment of Saturn's moons. Saturn's tilt is acquired when it is captured in a spin-orbit resonance with Neptune. A slow and extended migration of Neptune into the planetesimal disk before planetary encounters begin leaves the Kuiper belt with a broad inclination distribution. When Neptune's semi-major axis jumps outward after it encounters the ice giant objects captured in its 2:1 resonance during its previous migration escape, leaving a clump of low inclination objects with similar semi-major axes. The outward jump also releases objects from the 3:2 resonance, reducing the number of low inclination plutinos remaining at the end of Neptune's migration.

=== Late Heavy Bombardment ===
Most of the rocky impactors of the Late Heavy Bombardment originate from an inner extension of the asteroid belt yielding a smaller but longer lasting bombardment. The innermost region of the asteroid belt is currently sparsely populated due to the presence of the ν6 secular resonance. In the early Solar System, however, this resonance was located elsewhere and the asteroid belt extended farther inward, ending at Mars-crossing orbits. During the giant planet migration the ν6 secular resonance first rapidly traversed the asteroid belt removing roughly half of its mass, much less than in the original Nice model. When the planets reached their current positions the ν6 secular resonance destabilized the orbits of the innermost asteroids. Some of these quickly entered planet crossing orbit initiating the Late Heavy Bombardment. Others entered quasi-stable higher inclination orbits, later producing an extended tail of impacts, with a small remnant surviving as the Hungarias. The increase in the orbital eccentricities and inclinations of the destabilized objects also raised impact velocities, resulting in a change in the size distribution of lunar craters, and in the production of impact melt in the asteroid belt. The innermost (or E-belt) asteroids are estimated to have produced nine basin-forming impacts on the Moon between 4.1 and 3.7 billion years ago with three more originating from the core of the asteroid belt. The pre-Nectarian basins, part of the LHB in the original Nice model, are thought to be due to the impacts of leftover planetesimals from the inner Solar System.

The magnitude of the cometary bombardment is also reduced. The giant planets outward migration disrupts the outer planetesimal disk causing icy planetesimals to enter planet crossing orbits. Some of them are then perturbed by Jupiter onto orbits similar to those of Jupiter-family comets. These spend a significant fraction of their orbits crossing the inner Solar System raising their likelihood of impacting the terrestrial planets and the moon. In the original Nice model this results in a cometary bombardment with a magnitude similar to the asteroid bombardment. However, while low levels of iridium detected from rocks dating from this era have been cited as evidence of a cometary bombardment, other evidence such as the mix of highly siderophile elements in lunar rocks, and oxygen isotope ratios in the fragments of impactors are not consistent with a cometary bombardment. The size distribution of lunar craters is also largely consistent with that of the asteroids, leading to the conclusion the bombardment was dominated by asteroids. The bombardment by comets may have been reduced by a number of factors. The stirring of the orbits by Pluto-massed objects excites of the inclinations of the orbits of the icy planetimals, reducing the fraction of objects entering Jupiter-family orbits from 1/3 to 1/10. The mass of the outer disk in the five-planet model is roughly half that of the original Nice model. The magnitude of the bombardment may have been reduced further due to the icy planetesimals undergoing significant mass loss, or their having broken up as they entered the inner Solar System. The combination of these factors reduces the estimated largest impact basin to the size of Mare Crisium, roughly half the size of the Imbrium basin. Evidence of this bombardment may have been destroyed by later impacts by asteroids.

A number of issues have been raised regarding the connection between the Nice model and the Late Heavy Bombardment. Crater counts using topographic data from the Lunar Reconnaissance Orbiter find an excess of small craters relative to large impact-basins when compared to the size distribution of the asteroid belt. However, if the E-belt was the product of collisions among a small number of large asteroids, it may have had a size distribution that differed from that of the asteroid belt with a larger fraction of small bodies. A recent work has found that the bombardment originating from the inner band of asteroids would yield only two lunar basins and would be insufficient to explain ancient impact spherule beds. It suggests instead that debris from a massive impact was the source, noting that this would better match the size distribution of impact craters. A second work concurs, finding that the asteroid belt was probably not the source of the Late Heavy Bombardment. Noting the lack of direct evidence of cometary impactors, it proposes that leftover planetesimals were the source of most impacts and that Nice model instability may have occurred early. If a different crater scaling law is used, however, the Nice model is more likely to produce the impacts attributed to the Late Heavy bombardment and more recent impact craters.

=== Terrestrial planets ===
A giant-planet migration in which the ratio of the periods of Jupiter and Saturn quickly cross from below 2.1 to greater than 2.3 can leave the terrestrial planets with orbits similar to their current orbits. The eccentricities and inclinations of a group of planets can be represented by the angular momentum deficit (AMD), a measure of the differences of their orbits from circular coplanar orbits. A study by Brasser, Walsh, and Nesvorny found that when a selected jumping-Jupiter model was used, the current angular momentum deficit has a reasonable chance (~20%) of being reproduced in numerical simulations if the AMD was initially between 10% and 70% of the current value. The orbit of Mars is largely unchanged in these simulations indicating that its initial orbit must have been more eccentric and inclined than those of the other planets. The jumping-Jupiter model used in this study was not typical, however, being selected from among only 5% with Jupiter and Saturn's period ratio jumped to beyond 2.3 while reproducing other aspects of the outer Solar System.

The overall success rate of jumping-Jupiter models with a late instability reproducing both the inner and outer Solar System is small. When Kaib and Chambers conducted a large number of simulations starting with five giant planets in a resonance chain and Jupiter and Saturn in a 3:2 resonance, 85% resulted in the loss of a terrestrial planet, less than 5% reproduce the current AMD, and only 1% reproduce both the AMD and the giant planet orbits. In addition to the secular-resonance crossings, the jumps in Jupiter's eccentricity when it encounters an ice giant can also excite the orbits of the terrestrial planets. This led them to propose that the Nice model migration occurred before the formation of the terrestrial planets and that the LHB had another cause. However, the advantage of an early migration is significantly reduced by the requirement that the Jupiter–Saturn period ratio jump to beyond 2.3 to reproduce the current asteroid belt.

An early instability could be responsible for the low mass of Mars. If the instability occurs early the eccentricities of the embryos and planetesimals in the Mars region are excited causing many of them being ejected. This deprives Mars of material ending its growth early leaving Mars smaller relative to Earth and Venus.

The jumping-Jupiter model can reproduce the eccentricity and inclination of Mercury's orbit. Mercury's eccentricity is excited when it crosses a secular resonance with Jupiter. When relativistic effects are included, Mercury's precession rate is faster, which reduces the impact of this resonance crossing, and results in a smaller eccentricity similar to its current value. Mercury's inclination may be the result of it or Venus crossing a secular resonance with Uranus.

=== Asteroid belt ===
The rapid traverse of resonances through the asteroid belt can leave its population and the overall distribution of its orbital elements largely preserved. In this case the asteroid belt's depletion, the mixing of its taxonomical classes, and the excitation of its orbits, yielding a distribution of inclinations peaked near 10° and eccentricities peaked near 0.1, must have occurred earlier. These may be the product of Jupiter's Grand Tack, provided that an excess of higher eccentricity asteroids is removed due to interactions with the terrestrial planets. Gravitational stirring by planetary embryos embedded in the asteroid belt could also produce its depletion, mixing, and excitation. However, most if not all of the embryos must have been lost before the instability. A mixing of asteroids types could be the product of asteroids being scattered into the belt during the formation of the planets. An initially small mass asteroid belt could have its inclinations and eccentricities excited by secular resonances that hopped across the asteroid belt if Jupiter's and Saturn's orbits became chaotic while in resonance.

The orbits of the asteroids could be excited during the instability if the ice giant spent hundreds of thousands of years on a Jupiter crossing orbit. Numerous gravitational encounters between the ice giant and Jupiter during this period would cause frequent variations in Jupiter's semi-major axis, eccentricity and inclination. The forcing exerted by Jupiter on the orbits of the asteroids and the semi-major axes where it was strongest, would also vary, causing a chaotic excitation of the asteroids orbits that could reach or exceed their present level. The highest eccentricity asteroids would be later be removed by encounters with the terrestrial planets. The eccentricities of the terrestrial planets are excited beyond the current values during this process, however, requiring that the instability occur before their formation in this case. Gravitational stirring by embryos during the instability could increase the number of asteroids entered unstable orbits, resulting in the loss of 99–99.9% of its mass.

The sweeping of resonances and the penetration of the ice giant into the asteroid belt results in the dispersal of asteroid collisional families formed during or before the Late Heavy Bombardment. A collisional family's inclinations and eccentricities are dispersed due to the sweeping secular resonances, including those inside mean motion resonances, with the eccentricities being most affected. Perturbations by close encounters with the ice giant result in the spreading of a family's semi-major axes. Most collisional families would thus become unidentifiable by techniques such as the hierarchical clustering method, and V-type asteroids originating from impacts on Vesta could be scattered to the middle and outer asteroid belt. However, if the ice giant spent a short time crossing the asteroid belt, some collisional families may remain recognizable by identifying the V-shaped patterns in plots of semi-major axes vs absolute magnitude produced by the Yarkovsky effect. The survival of the Hilda collisional family, a subset of the Hilda group thought to have formed during the LHB because of the current low collision rate, may be due to its creation after Hilda's jump-capture in the 3:2 resonance as the ice giant was ejected. The stirring of semi-major axes by the ice giant may also remove fossil Kirkwood gaps formed before the instability.

Planetesimals from the outer disc are embedded in all parts of the asteroid belt, remaining as P- and D-type asteroids. While Jupiter's resonances sweep across the asteroid belt, outer disk planetesimals are captured by its inner resonances, evolve to lower eccentricities via secular resonances within these resonances, and are released onto stable orbits as Jupiter's resonances move on. Other planetesimals are implanted in the asteroid belt during encounters with the ice giant, either directly leaving them with aphelia higher than that of the ice giant's perihelia, or by removing them from a resonance. Jumps in Jupiter's semi-major axis during its encounters with the ice giant shift the locations of its resonances, releasing some objects and capturing others. Many of those remaining after its final jump, along with others captured by the sweeping resonances as Jupiter migrates to its current location, survive as parts of the resonant populations such as the Hildas, Thule, and those in the 2:1 resonance. Objects originating in the asteroid belt can also be captured in the 2:1 resonance, along with a few among the Hilda population. The excursions the ice giant makes into the asteroid belt allows the icy planetesimals to be implanted farther into the asteroid belt, with a few reaching the inner asteroid belt with semi-major axis less than 2.5 AU. Some objects later drift into unstable resonances due to diffusion or the Yarkovsky effect and enter Earth-crossing orbits, with the Tagish Lake meteorite representing a possible fragment of an object that originated in the outer planetesimal disk. Numerical simulations of this process can roughly reproduce the distribution of P- and D-type asteroids and the size of the largest bodies, with differences such as an excess of objects smaller than 10 km being attributed to losses from collisions or the Yarkovsky effect, and the specific evolution of the planets in the model.

=== Trojans ===
Most of the Jupiter trojans are jump-captured shortly after gravitational encounters between Jupiter and an ice giant. During these encounters Jupiter's semi-major axis can jump by as much as 0.2 AU, displacing the L4 and L5 points radially, and releasing many existing Jupiter trojans. New Jupiter trojans are captured from the population of planetesimals with semi-major axes similar to Jupiter's new semi-major axis. The captured trojans have a wide range of inclinations and eccentricities, the result of their being scattered by the giant planets as they migrated from their original location in the outer disk. Some additional trojans are captured, and others lost, during weak-resonance crossings as the co-orbital regions become temporarily chaotic. Following its final encounters with Jupiter the ice giant may pass through one of Jupiter's trojan swarms, scattering many, and reducing its population. In simulations, the orbital distribution of Jupiter trojans captured and the asymmetry between the L4 and L5 populations is similar to that of the current Solar System and is largely independent of Jupiter's encounter history. Estimates of the planetesimal disk mass required for the capture of the current population of Jupiter trojans range from 15 to 20 Earth masses, consistent with the mass required to reproduce other aspects of the outer Solar System.

Planetesimals are also captured as Neptune trojans during the instability when Neptune's semimajor axis jumps. The broad inclination distribution of the Neptune trojans indicates that the inclinations of their orbits must have been excited before they were captured. The number of Neptune trojans may have been reduced due to Uranus and Neptune being closer to a 2:1 resonance in the past.

=== Irregular satellites ===
Jupiter captures a population of irregular satellites and the relative size of Saturn's population is increased. During gravitational encounters between planets, the hyperbolic orbits of unbound planetesimals around one giant planet are perturbed by the presence of the other. If the geometry and velocities are right, these three-body interactions leave the planetesimal in a bound orbit when planets separate. Although this process is reversible, loosely bound satellites including possible primordial satellites can also escape during these encounters, tightly bound satellites remain and the number of irregular satellites increases over a series of encounters. Following the encounters, the satellites with inclinations between 60° and 130° are lost due to the Kozai resonance and the more distant prograde satellites are lost to the evection resonance. Collisions among the satellites result in the formation of families, in a significant loss of mass, and in a shift of their size distribution. The populations and orbits of Jupiter's irregular satellites captured in simulations are largely consistent with observations. Himalia, which has a spectra similar to asteroids in the middle of the asteroid belt, is somewhat larger than the largest captured in simulations. If it was a primordial object its odds of surviving the series of gravitational encounters range from 0.01 - 0.3, with the odds falling as the number increases. Saturn has more frequent encounters with the ice giant in the jumping-Jupiter scenario, and Uranus and Neptune have fewer encounters if that was a fifth giant planet. This increases the size of Saturn's population relative to Uranus and Neptune when compared to the original Nice model, producing a closer match with observations.

=== Regular satellites ===
The orbits of Jupiter's regular satellites can remain dynamically cold despite encounters between the giant planets. Gravitational encounters between planets perturb the orbits of their satellites, exciting inclinations and eccentricities, and altering semi-major axes. If these encounters would lead to results inconsistent with the observations, for example, collisions between or the ejections of satellites or the disruption of the Laplace resonance of Jupiter's moons Io, Europa and Ganymede, this could provide evidence against jumping-Jupiter models. In simulations, collisions between or the ejection of satellites was found to be unlikely, requiring an ice giant to approach within 0.02 AU of Jupiter. More distant encounters that disrupted the Laplace resonance were more common, though tidal interactions often lead to their recapture. A sensitive test of jumping-Jupiter models is the inclination of Callisto's orbit, which isn't damped by tidal interactions. Callisto's inclination remained small in six out of ten 5-planet models tested in one study (including some where Jupiter acquired irregular satellites consistent with observations), and another found the likelihood of Jupiter ejecting a fifth giant planet while leaving Callisto's orbit dynamically cold at 42%. Callisto is also unlikely to have been part of the Laplace resonance, because encounters that raise it to its current orbit leave it with an excessive inclination.

The encounters between planets also perturb the orbits of the moons of the other outer planets. Saturn's moon Iapetus could have been excited to its current inclination, if the ice giant's closest approach was out of the plane of Saturn's equator. If Saturn acquired its tilt before the encounters, Iapetus's inclination could also be excited due to multiple changes of its semi-major axis, because the inclination of Saturn's Laplace plane would vary with the distance from Saturn. In simulations, Iapetus was excited to its current inclination in five of ten of the jumping-Jupiter models tested, though three left it with excessive eccentricity. The preservation of Oberon's small inclination favors the 5-planet models, with only a few encounters between Uranus and an ice giant, over 4-planet models in which Uranus encounters Jupiter and Saturn. The low inclination of Uranus's moon Oberon, 0.1°, was preserved in nine out of ten of five planet models, while its preservation was found to be unlikely in four planet models. The encounters between planets may have also been responsible for the absence of regular satellites of Uranus beyond the orbit of Oberon.

The loss of ices from the inner satellites due to impacts is reduced. Numerous impacts of planetesimals onto the satellites of the outer planets occur during the Late Heavy Bombardment. In the bombardment predicted by the original Nice model, these impacts generate enough heat to vaporize the ices of Mimas, Enceladus and Miranda. The smaller mass planetesimal belt in the five planet models reduces this bombardment. Furthermore, the gravitational stirring by Pluto-massed objects in the Nice 2 model excites the inclinations and eccentricities of planetesimals. This increases their velocities relative to the giant planets, decreasing the effectiveness of gravitational focusing, thereby reducing the fraction of planetesimals impacting the inner satellites. Combined these reduce the bombardment by an order of magnitude. Estimates of the impacts on Iapetus are also less than 20% of that of the original Nice model.

Some of the impacts are catastrophic, resulting in the disruption of the inner satellites. In the bombardment of the original Nice model this may result in the disruption of several of the satellites of Saturn and Uranus. An order of magnitude reduction in the bombardment avoids the destruction of Dione and Ariel; but Miranda, Mimas, Enceladus, and perhaps Tethys would still be disrupted. These may be second generation satellites formed from the re-accretion of disrupted satellites. In this case Mimas would not be expected to be differentiated and the low density of Tethys may be due to it forming primarily from the mantle of a disrupted progenitor. Alternatively they may have accreted later from a massive Saturnian ring, or even as recently as 100 Myr ago after the last generation of moons were destroyed in an orbital instability.

=== Giant planet tilts ===
Jupiter's and Saturn's tilts can be produced by spin-orbit resonances. A spin-orbit resonance occurs when the precession frequency of a planet's spin-axis matches the precession frequency of another planet's ascending node. These frequencies vary during the planetary migration with the semi-major axes of the planets and the mass of the planetesimal disk. Jupiter's small tilt may be due to a quick crossing of a spin-orbit resonance with Neptune while Neptune's inclination was small, for example, during Neptune's initial migration before planetary encounters began. Alternatively, if that crossing occurred when Jupiter's semi-major axis jumped, it may be due to its current proximity to spin-orbit resonance with Uranus. Saturn's large tilt can be acquired if it is captured in a spin-orbit resonance with Neptune as Neptune slowly approached its current orbit at the end of the migration. The final tilts of Jupiter and Saturn are very sensitive to the final positions of the planets: Jupiter's tilt would be much larger if Uranus migrated beyond its current orbit, Saturn's would be much smaller if Neptune's migration ended earlier or if the resonance crossing was more rapid. Even in simulations where the final position of the giant planets are similar to the current Solar System, Jupiter's and Saturn's tilt are reproduced less than 10% of the time.

=== Kuiper belt ===
A slow migration of Neptune covering several AU results in a Kuiper belt with a broad inclination distribution. As Neptune migrates outward it scatters many objects from the planetesimal disk onto orbits with larger semi-major axes. Some of these planetesimals are then captured in mean-motion resonances with Neptune. While in a mean-motion resonance, their orbits can evolve via processes such as the Kozai mechanism, reducing their eccentricities and increasing their inclinations; or via apsidal and nodal resonances, which alter eccentricities and inclinations respectively. Objects that reach low-eccentricity high-perihelion orbits can escape from the mean-motion resonance and are left behind in stable orbits as Neptune's migration continues. The inclination distribution of the hot classical Kuiper belt objects is reproduced in numerical simulations where Neptune migrated smoothly from 24 AU to 28 AU with an exponential timescale of 10 million years before jumping outward when it encounters with a fifth giant planet and with a 30 million years exponential timescale thereafter. The slow pace and extended distance of this migration provides sufficient time for inclinations to be excited before the resonances reach the region of Kuiper belt where the hot classical objects are captured and later deposited. If Neptune reaches an eccentricity greater than 0.12 following its encounter with the fifth giant planet hot classical Kuiper belt objects can also be captured due to secular forcing. Secular forcing causes the eccentricities of objects to oscillate, allowing some to reach smaller eccentricity orbits that become stable once Neptune reaches a low eccentricity. The inclinations of Kuiper belt objects can also be excited by secular resonances outside resonances, however, preventing the inclination distribution from being used to definitely determine the speed of Neptune's migration.

The objects that remain in the mean-motion resonances at the end of Neptune's migration form the resonant populations such as the plutinos. Few low inclination objects resembling the cold classical objects remain among the plutinos at the end of the Neptune's migration. The outward jump in Neptune's semi-major axes releases the low-inclination low-eccentricity objects that were captured as Neptune's 3:2 resonance initially swept outward. Afterwards, the capture of low inclination plutinos was largely prevented due to the excitation of inclinations and eccentricities as secular resonances slowly sweep ahead of it. The slow migration of Neptune also allows objects to reach large inclinations before capture in resonances and to evolve to lower eccentricities without escaping from resonance. The number of planetesimals with initial semi-major axes beyond 30 AU must have been small to avoid an excess of objects in Neptune's 5:4 and 4:3 resonances.

Encounters between Neptune and Pluto-massed objects reduce the fraction of Kuiper belt objects in resonances. Velocity changes during the gravitational encounters with planetesimals that drive Neptune's migration cause small jumps in its semi-major axis, yielding a migration that is grainy instead of smooth. The shifting locations of the resonances produced by this rough migration increases the libration amplitudes of resonant objects, causing many to become unstable and escape from resonances. The observed ratio of hot classical objects to plutinos is best reproduced in simulations that include 1000–4000 Pluto-massed objects (i.e. large dwarf planets) or about 1000 bodies twice as massive as Pluto, making up 10–40% of the 20-Earth-mass planetesimal disk, with roughly 0.1% of this initial disk remaining in various parts of the Kuiper belt. The grainy migration also reduces the number of plutinos relative to objects in the 2:1 and 5:2 resonances with Neptune, and results in a population of plutinos with a narrower distribution of libration amplitudes. A large number of Pluto-massed objects would requires the Kuiper belt's size distribution to have multiple deviations from a constant slope.

The kernel of the cold classical Kuiper belt objects is left behind when Neptune encounters the fifth giant planet. The kernel is a concentration of Kuiper belt objects with small eccentricities and inclinations, and with semi-major axes of 44–44.5 AU identified by the Canada–France Ecliptic Plane Survey. As Neptune migrates outward low-inclination low-eccentricity objects are captured by its 2:1 mean-motion resonance. These objects are carried outward in this resonance until Neptune reaches 28 AU. At this time Neptune encounters the fifth ice giant, which has been scattered outward by Jupiter. The gravitational encounter causes Neptune's semi-major axis to jump outward. The objects that were in the 2:1 resonance, however, remain in their previous orbits and are left behind as Neptune's migration continues. Those objects that have been pushed-out a short distance have small eccentricities and are added to the local population of cold classical KBOs. Others that have been carried longer distances have their eccentricities excited during this process. While most of these are released on higher eccentricity orbits a few have their eccentricities reduced due to a secular resonance within the 2:1 resonance and released as part of the kernel or earlier due to Neptune's grainy migration. Among these are objects from regions no longer occupied by dynamically cold objects that formed in situ, such as between 38 and 40 AU. Pushing out in resonance allows these loosely bound, neutrally colored or 'blue' binaries to be implanted without encountering Neptune. The kernel has also been reproduced in a simulation in which a more violent instability occurred without a preceding migration of Neptune and the disk was truncated at ~44.5 AU.

The low eccentricities and inclinations of the cold classical belt objects places some constraints on the evolution of Neptune's orbit. They would be preserved if the eccentricity and inclination of Neptune following its encounter with another ice giant remained small (e < 0.12 and i < 6°) or was damped quickly. This constraint may be relaxed somewhat if Neptune's precession is rapid due to strong interactions with Uranus or a high surface density disk. A combination of these may allow the cold classical belt to be reproduced even in simulations with more violent instabilities. If Neptune's rapid precession rate drops temporarily, a 'wedge' of missing low eccentricity objects can form beyond 44 AU. The appearance of this wedge can also be reproduced if the size of objects initially beyond 45 AU declined with distance. A more extended period of Neptune's slow precession could allow low eccentricity objects to remain in the cold classical belt if its duration coincided with that of the oscillations of the objects' eccentricities. A slow sweeping of resonances, with an exponential timescale of 100 million years, while Neptune has a modest eccentricity can remove the higher-eccentricity low-inclination objects, truncating the eccentricity distribution of the cold classical belt objects and leaving a step near the current position of Neptune's 7:4 resonance.

=== Scattered disk ===
In the scattered disk, a slow and grainy migration of Neptune leaves detached objects with perihelia greater than 40 AU clustered near its resonances. Planetesimals scattered outward by Neptune are captured in resonances, evolve onto lower-eccentricity higher-inclination orbits, and are released onto stable higher perihelion orbits. Beyond 50 AU this process requires a slower migration of Neptune for the perihelia to be raised above 40 AU. As a result, in the scattered disk fossilized high-perihelion objects are left behind only during the latter parts of Neptune's migration, yielding short trails (or fingers) on a plot of eccentricity vs. semi-major axis, near but just inside the current locations of Neptune's resonances. The extent of these trails is dependent on the timescale of Neptune's migration and extends farther inward if the timescale is longer. The release of these objects from resonance is aided by a grainy migration of Neptune which may be necessary for an object like 2004 XR190 to have escaped from Neptune's 8:3 resonance. If the encounter with the fifth planet leaves Neptune with a large eccentricity the semi-major axes of the high perihelion objects would be distributed more symmetrically about Neptune's resonances, unlike the objects observed by OSSOS.

The dynamics of the scattered disk left by Neptune's migration varies with distance. During Neptune's outward migration many objects are scattered onto orbits with semi-major axes greater than 50 AU. Similar to in the Kuiper belt, some of these objects are captured by and remain in a resonance with Neptune, while others escape from resonance onto stable orbits after their perihelia are raised. Other objects with perihelia near Neptune's also remain at the end of Neptune's migration. The orbits of these scattering objects vary with time as they continue to interact with Neptune, with some of them entering planet crossing orbits, briefly becoming centaurs or comets before they are ejected from the Solar System. Roughly 80% of the objects between 50 and 200 AU have stable, resonant or detached, orbits with semi-major axes that vary less than 1.5 AU per billion years. The remaining 20% are actively scattering objects with semi-major axes that vary significantly due to interactions with Neptune. Beyond 200 AU most objects in the scattered disc are actively scattering. The total mass deposited in the scattered disk is about twice that of the classical Kuiper belt, with roughly 80% of the objects surviving to the present having semi-major axes less than 200 AU. Lower inclination detached objects become scarcer with increasing semi-major axis, possible due to stable mean motion resonances, or the Kozai resonance within these resonances, requiring a minimum inclination that increases with semi-major axis.

=== Planet Nine cloud ===
If the hypothetical Planet Nine exists and was present during the giant planet migration, a cloud of objects with similar semi-major axes would be formed. Objects scattered outward to semi-major axes greater than 200 AU would have their perihelia raised by the dynamical effects of Planet Nine decoupling them from the influence of Neptune. The semi-major axes of the objects dynamically controlled by Planet Nine would be centered on its semi-major axis, ranging from 200 AU to ~2000 AU, with most objects having semi-major axes greater than that of Planet Nine. Their inclinations would be roughly isotropic, ranging up to 180 degrees. The perihelia of these object would cycle over periods of over 100 Myr, returning many to the influence of the Neptune. The estimated mass remaining at the current time is 0.3–0.4 Earth masses.

=== Oort cloud ===
Some of the objects scattered onto very distant orbits during the giant planet migration are captured in the Oort cloud. The outer Oort cloud, semi-major axes greater than 20,000 AU, forms quickly as the galactic tide raises the perihelion of object beyond the orbits of the giant planets. The inner Oort cloud forms more slowly, from the outside in, due to the weaker effect of the galactic tide on objects with smaller semi-major axes. Most objects captured in the outer Oort cloud are scattered outward by Saturn, without encountering Jupiter, with some being scattered outward by Uranus and Neptune. Those captured in the inner Oort cloud are primarily scattered outward by Neptune. Roughly 6.5% of the planetesimals beyond Neptune's initial orbit, approximately 1.3 Earth masses, are captured in the Oort cloud with roughly 60% in the inner cloud.

Objects may also have been captured earlier and from other sources. As the Sun left its birth cluster objects could have been captured in the Oort cloud from other stars. If the gas disk extended beyond the orbits of the giant planets when they cleared their neighborhoods comet-sized object are slowed by gas drag preventing them from reaching the Oort cloud. However, if Uranus and Neptune formed late, some of the objects cleared from their neighborhood after the gas disk dissipates may be captured in the Oort cloud. If the Sun remained in its birth cluster at this time, or during the planetary migration if that occurred early, the Oort cloud formed would be more compact.

== See also ==
- Grand tack hypothesis
