= Fifth Giant =

Hypothetical gas giant ejected out of the Solar System

- Artist's impression

Orbital characteristics
- Semi-major axis: 9 AU (hypothesized); 15.07 AU
- Orbital period (sidereal): 27 Earth years (hypothesized)
- Star: Sun (formerly)

Physical characteristics
- Mean diameter: 74814 km
- Mean radius: 37407 km
- Mass: 10–20 or 35 M_{🜨} (hypothesized); 211.14×10^{24} kg
- Mean density: 0.963 g/cm^{3}
- Surface gravity: 10.07 m/s^{2}

The Fifth Giant is a hypothetical ice giant proposed as part of the five-planet Nice model, an extension of the Nice model of Solar System evolution. This hypothesis suggests that the early Solar System once contained a fifth giant planet in addition to the four currently known giant planets: Jupiter, Saturn, Uranus, and Neptune. The Fifth Giant is theorized to have been ejected from the Solar System due to gravitational interactions with Saturn and Jupiter during the chaotic phase of planetary migration, approximately 4.1 billion years ago.

== Background ==
The Nice model, developed in the early 2000s, describes the dynamical evolution of the Solar System following the dissipation of the protoplanetary disk. It posits that the giant planets initially formed in a more compact configuration and subsequently migrated to their current orbits due to interactions with a massive disk of planetesimals. These interactions are believed to have triggered a period of orbital instability, resulting in the dispersal of the planetesimal disk and the capture of irregular moons.

The addition of a fifth giant planet to this model arose as researchers attempted to resolve discrepancies between the Nice Model's predictions and observational data, particularly regarding the current orbital distribution of the outer planets and the Kuiper belt.

== Characteristics ==
The Fifth Giant is hypothesized to have been an ice giant, similar in composition to Uranus and Neptune. It likely had a mass between 10 and 20 Earth masses and an orbit initially located between those of Saturn and Uranus. However, a study in 2026 place the Fifth Giant as outermost gas planet (around 20 AU). A following study in 2012 estimated a radius of 37,407 kilometres (23,244 mi) and a diameter of 74,814 kilometres (46,487 mi), a mass of 211.14×10^{24} kg, a density of 0.963 g/cm^{3} and a surface gravity of 10.07 m/s^{2}. Computer simulations indicate that such a planet could have influenced the dynamical evolution of the Solar System, shaping the orbits of the outer planets and accounting for the observed gaps in the Kuiper belt.

== Ejection mechanism ==
The ejection of the Fifth Giant is believed to have occurred during the early Solar System's period of instability, when gravitational interactions between the giant planets became chaotic. The planet likely encountered a series of close gravitational encounters with Jupiter or Saturn, resulting in its eventual expulsion from the Solar System. Such an event would have minimized the disruption to the orbits of the remaining planets while aligning with constraints derived from their current orbital architecture.

The ejection process may have also played a role in scattering planetesimals to form the Oort cloud or altering the trajectories of comets and asteroids.

== Observational evidence ==
Direct evidence for the Fifth Giant's existence is lacking, as the planet would have been ejected into interstellar space and is no longer gravitationally bound to the Sun. However, indirect evidence has been cited to support the hypothesis:

- Orbital resonances: The current orbital spacing and resonances among the giant planets are better explained in simulations that include an additional giant planet.
- Kuiper Belt structure: The sculpting of the Kuiper belt and the distribution of trans-Neptunian objects are more consistent with models involving a fifth giant planet.
- Irregular moons: The capture of irregular moons around Jupiter, Saturn, Uranus, and Neptune aligns with the chaotic conditions predicted during the Fifth Giant's ejection.

== Relation to Planet Nine ==
The concept of an additional giant planet is distinct from the search for Planet Nine, a hypothetical planet proposed to explain the clustering of certain trans-Neptunian objects. While both hypotheses suggest the presence of a missing planet, the Fifth Giant would have been ejected billions of years ago, whereas Planet Nine is theorized to remain within the Solar System.

== See also ==
- Nice model
- Five-planet Nice model
- Planet Nine
- Jumping-Jupiter scenario
- Formation and evolution of the Solar System
- Kuiper belt
- Oort cloud
- Super-Neptune
