= E-belt asteroids =

Hypothetical extension of the asteroid belt

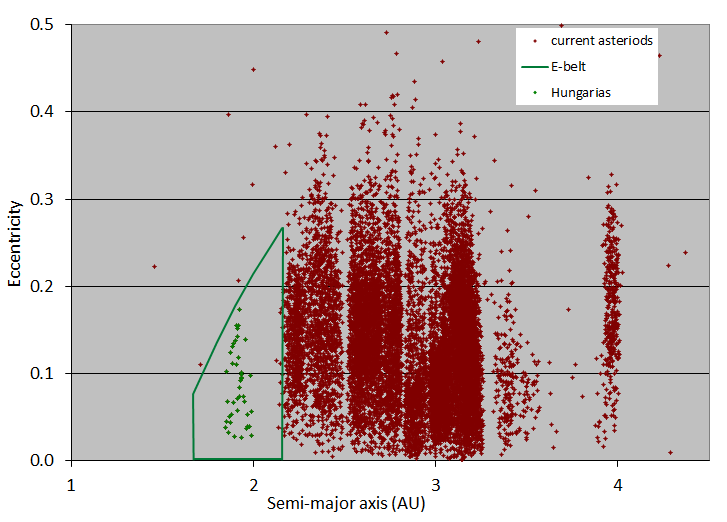
— zone of E-belt asteroids, with current: main-belt asteroids, and Hungaria asteroids

The E-belt asteroids were the population of a hypothetical extension of the primordial asteroid belt proposed as the source of most of the basin-forming lunar impacts during the Late Heavy Bombardment 4 billion years ago.

== E-belt model ==
The E-belt model was developed by William F. Bottke, David Vokrouhlicky, David Minton, David Nesvorný, Alessandro Morbidelli, Ramon Brasser, Bruce Simonson and Harold Levison. It describes the dynamics of an inner band of the early asteroid belt within the framework of the Nice model.

=== Location and stability ===
The extended-belt asteroids were located between the current inner boundary of the asteroid belt and the orbit of Mars with semi-major axis ranging from 1.7 to 2.1 astronomical units (AU). In the current Solar System most orbits in this region are unstable due to the presence of the ν_{6} secular resonance. However, prior to the giant planet migration described in the Nice model the outer planets would have been in a more compact configuration with nearly circular orbits. With the planets in this configuration the ν_{6} secular resonance would be located outside the asteroid belt. Stable orbits would have existed inside 2.1 AU and the inner edge of the primordial asteroid belt would have been defined by Mars-crossing orbits.

=== Late Heavy Bombardment ===
During the migration of the giant planets the ν_{6} secular resonance would have moved inward as Saturn moved outward. Upon reaching its current location near 2.1 AU the ν_{6} secular resonance and other related resonances would destabilize the orbits of the E-belt asteroids. Most would be driven onto planet-crossing orbits as their eccentricities and inclinations increased. Over a period of 400 million years impacts of the E-belt asteroids yield an estimated 9-10 of the 12 basin-forming lunar impacts attributed to the Late Heavy Bombardment.

=== Hungaria asteroids ===
As their orbits evolved many of the E-belt asteroids would have acquired orbits similar to those of the Hungaria asteroids with high inclinations and semimajor axis between 1.8 and 2.0 AU. Because orbits in this region are dynamically sticky these objects would form a quasi-stable reservoir. As this population of the E-belt asteroids leaked from this reservoir they would produce a long-lived tail of impacts after the traditional end of the late heavy bombardment at 3.7 billion years ago. A remnant representing roughly 0.1–0.4% of the original E-belt asteroids would remain as the current Hungaria asteroids.

== Evidence of extended belt ==
=== Problems with alternative sources of LHB ===
Evidence for the Moon does not support comets from the outer planetesimal belt as the source of the basin-forming lunar impacts. The size frequency distribution (SFD) of ancient lunar craters is a similar to the SFD of main belt asteroids instead of that of comets. Samples recovered from the Moon containing impact melts have a range of ages rather than the sharp spike expected if comets produced the LHB. Analysis of highly siderophile elements in these samples shows a better match for impactors from the inner Solar System than for comets. Studies of the dynamics of the main asteroid belt during giant planet migration have significantly limited the number of impactors originating from this region. A rapid alteration of Jupiter's and Saturn's orbits is necessary to reproduce the current orbital distribution. This scenario removes only 50% of the asteroids from the main belt producing 2–3 basins on the Moon.

=== Support for E-belt as source of LHB ===
Examination of samples recovered from the Moon indicates that the impactors were thermally evolved objects. E-type asteroids, an example of this type, are uncommon in the main belt but become more common toward the inner belt and would be expected to be most common in the E-belt. The Hungaria asteroids, which are a remnant of the E-belt in this model, contain a sizable fraction of E-type asteroids.

The decay of the population of E-belt asteroids captured onto Hungaria like orbits produces a long-lived tail of impacts which continues past the LHB. The continuation of the bombardment is predicted to generate basin-forming impacts on the Earth and Chicxulub-sized craters on the Earth and Moon. Impact craters on the Moon and impact spherule beds found on the Earth dated to this period are consistent with these predictions.

The E-belt model predicts a remnant population will remain on Hungaria-like orbits. The initial population of E-belt asteroids was calculated based on the population of potential basin-forming impactors remaining among the Hungaria asteroids. The result was consistent with calculations based on the recent estimates of the orbital density of the main asteroid belt before the planetary migration.
