= Nice 2 model =

Model of early Solar System evolution

The Nice 2 model is a model of the early evolution of the Solar System. The Nice 2 model resembles the original Nice model in that a late instability of the outer Solar System results in gravitational encounters between planets, the disruption of an outer planetesimal disk, and the migrations of the outer planets to new orbits. However, the Nice 2 model differs in its initial conditions and in the mechanism for triggering the late instability. These changes reflect the analysis of the orbital evolution of the outer Solar System during the gas disk phase and the inclusion of gravitational interactions between planetesimals in the outer disk into the model.

== Description ==
The Nice 2 model begins with the outer planets in a stable quadruple resonance with each planet in resonance with its nearest neighbors. One example among several potential stable quadruple resonance configurations is Jupiter and Saturn in a 3:2 resonance, Saturn and Uranus in a 3:2 resonance, and Uranus and Neptune in a 4:3 resonance. Interactions with an outer planetesimal disk that is gravitationally stirred by Pluto-sized objects cause the planets to migrate inward while remaining in resonance. During this migration the eccentricity of the inner ice giant increases, leading to secular-resonance crossings. After several hundred million years, the resonant configuration is destabilized during one of these secular-resonance crossings. Gravitational encounters between the planets similar to those in the original Nice model begin shortly thereafter.

== Development ==
The Nice 2 model addresses some weaknesses of the original Nice model. The first weakness is the artificial selection of the initial orbits of the outer planets to produce an instability that matches the timing of the Late Heavy Bombardment. The second weakness is the sensitivity of the timing of the instability to the location of the inner edge of the planetesimal disk. The Nice 2 model uses particular initial conditions, derived from the examination of the orbital evolution of giant planets orbiting in a gas disk, which may occur under appropriate circumstances. An instability trigger with no apparent correlation between the timing of the instability and the position of the inner edge of the planetesimal disk is the result of the incorporation of the interactions between planetesimals into the Nice 2 model.

== Initial conditions ==
The initial orbits of the giant planets in the Nice 2 model correspond to a predicted orbital structure of the outer Solar System at the end of the gas disk phase. Models of giant planets orbiting in a gas disk predict that they would migrate toward the central star at a rate dependent on the mass of the planet and characteristics of the disk. In a system with multiple planets this migration can result in the convergence of the planet's orbits and their capture into mean-motion resonances. Investigations focusing on Jupiter and Saturn demonstrated that they can be captured in a 3:2 or 2:1 resonance depending on the characteristics of the protoplanetary disk. After capture into resonance, the gaps that Jupiter and Saturn formed in the disk's density distribution may overlap and their inward migration may be halted or reversed. When Uranus and Neptune are added in turn to the model they are captured into further resonances with the capture of the outer ice giant resulting in the inner ice giant having a higher eccentricity than the other planets. The result is a system in a quadruple resonance. A number of stable configurations have been identified with the particular final configuration depending on the starting locations of the planets.

== Instability trigger ==
The inclusion of gravitational interactions between planetesimals in the outer disk revealed an alternative mechanism for triggering the late instability of the outer planets. During numerical simulations that included the gravitational interactions between planetesimals, a transfer of energy between the disk and the planets was observed. This energy transfer led to the migration of the planets toward the Sun and occurred even when there were no encounters between planetesimals and the planets. As the migration progressed the eccentricity of the inner ice giant increased. In some of the simulations the quadruple resonance was eventually destabilized resulting in gravitational encounters between planets. The instability was observed in 25% of the simulations with the timing varying between 300 million and 1 billion years. No correlation between the location of the inner edge of the planetesimal disk and the occurrence or the timing of the instability was apparent.

Closer investigation using a simpler model with one planet and a planetesimal disk indicated that the energy transfer was due to a coupling between the eccentricity of the planetesimals in the outer belt and the semi-major axis of the planet. As a result of this coupling an increase in the average eccentricity of the planetesimal belt driven via the gravitational stirring by Pluto-sized objects yields a decrease in the semi-major axis of the planet. The coupling was found to be proportional to the eccentricity of the planet and in a multiple planet system would have its greatest effect on the most eccentric planet.

The increase in the eccentricity of the inner ice giant was found to be due to the varying strengths of the coupling between the planetesimal disk and the planets. The inner ice giant, with its higher eccentricity due to its resonant capture of the outer ice giant, would normally migrate at a faster rate than the other planets. However, since the resonant configuration requires that the migration be synchronized, the inner ice giant must drag the other planets along. The increase in the inner ice giant's eccentricity is a result of this process.

Examination of the orbital evolution of the planets revealed that the destabilization of their orbits was due to secular resonance crossings. The increase of the eccentricity of the inner ice giant during the migration led to the slow variation of the precession frequencies of the planets. Secular resonances occurred when these frequencies became similar. The eccentricity of the inner ice giant fluctuated during these secular resonance crossings, sometimes dropping enough to cause the breaking of the quadruple resonance. Whether the quadruple resonance broke was determined by the strength of the secular resonance and the time spent in the secular resonance.

The nature of the instability mechanism is responsible for the lack of a correlation between the distance to the inner edge of the planetesimal belt and the timing of the instability. If the inner edge of the planetesimal disk is close the migration of the planets occurs at a faster rate. More secular resonance crossings occur but since less time is spent in each one only the strongest can break the quadruple resonance. The reverse is true for a more distant planetesimal belt. As a result of the conflict between these factors the timing and the occurrence of the instability is fairly independent of the distance to the inner edge of the planetesimal belt.

== Potential issues and an alternative ==
A study using a numerical simulation that included gravitational interactions among all objects revealed that a dynamical instability occurred in less than 70 million years. Interactions between planetesimals dynamically heated the disk and lead to earlier interactions between the planetesimals and giant planets. This study used a limited number of planetesimals due to computational constraints so it is as yet unknown whether this result would apply to a more complete disk.

The combination of the late destabilization of a five planet resonant chain and an extended migration of Neptune is unlikely. Reproducing the orbital distribution of the Kuiper belt objects requires that Neptune undergo a migration of several AU, reaching 28 AU before the encounters between planets begin. This migration of Neptune is likely if the planetesimal disk began within 2 AU of Neptune's initial orbit. However, a late destabilization of the resonance chain requires a more distant disk, at least 4 AU beyond Neptune's orbit.

An early breaking of the resonance chain followed by a slow dust-driven migration may bridge this gap. The dust-driven is the result of collision among the planetesimals producing debris that is ground to dust in a collisional cascade. The dust then spirals toward the orbits of the planets due to Poynting–Robertson drag. Interactions with this dust disrupts the resonance chain and drive their migration toward the planetesimal disk over a several hundred million years period. The instability mechanism of the Nice 2 model becomes irrelevant if the dust generated by collisions among the planetesimals disrupts a resonant chain early.

== See also ==
- Jumping-Jupiter scenario
- Five-planet Nice model
