= Jupiter trojan =

Asteroid sharing the orbit of Jupiter

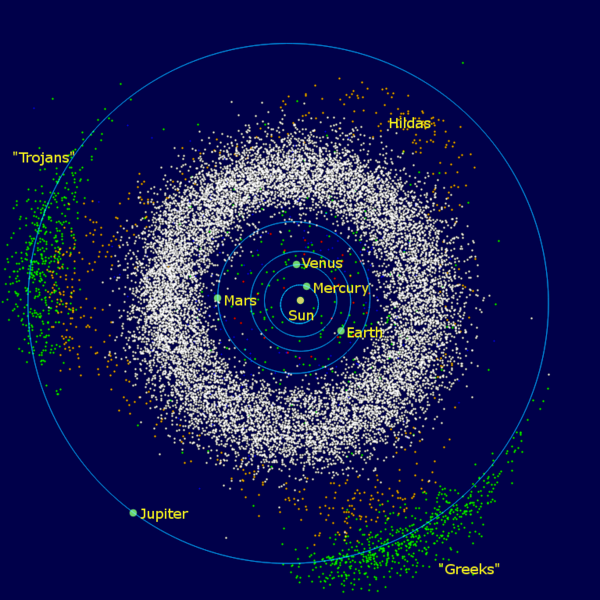
The asteroids of the inner Solar System and Jupiter: Jupiter trojans Hilda asteroids / Asteroid belt Orbits of planets; The Jupiter trojans are divided into two groups: The Greek camp in front of and the Trojan camp trailing behind Jupiter in their orbit.

The Jupiter trojans, commonly called trojan asteroids or simply trojans, are a large group of asteroids that share the planet Jupiter's orbit around the Sun. Relative to Jupiter, each trojan librates around one of Jupiter's stable Lagrange points: either L_{4}, existing 60° ahead of the planet in its orbit, or L_{5}, 60° behind. Jupiter trojans are distributed in two elongated, curved regions around these Lagrangian points with an average semi-major axis of about 5.2 AU.

The first Jupiter trojan discovered, 588 Achilles, was spotted in 1906 by German astronomer Max Wolf. More than 15,300 Jupiter trojans have been found as of October 2025. By convention, they are each named from Greek mythology after a figure of the Trojan War, hence the name "trojan". The total number of Jupiter trojans larger than 1 km in diameter is believed to be about 1 million, approximately equal to the number of asteroids larger than 1 km in the asteroid belt. Like main-belt asteroids, Jupiter trojans form families.

As of 2004, many Jupiter trojans showed to observational instruments as dark bodies with reddish, featureless spectra. No firm evidence of the presence of water, or any other specific compound on their surface has been obtained, but it is thought that they are coated in tholins, organic polymers formed by the Sun's radiation. The Jupiter trojans' densities (as measured by studying binaries or rotational lightcurves) vary from 0.8 to 2.5 g·cm^{−3}. Jupiter trojans are thought to have been captured into their orbits during the early stages of the Solar System's formation or slightly later, during the migration of giant planets.

The term "Trojan asteroid" specifically refers to the asteroids co-orbital with Jupiter, but the general term "trojan" is sometimes more generally applied to other small Solar System bodies with similar relationships to larger bodies: Mars trojans, Neptune trojans, Uranus trojans and Earth trojans are known to exist. Temporary Venus trojans and Saturn trojans exist, as well as for 1 Ceres and 4 Vesta. The term "Trojan asteroid" is normally understood to specifically mean the Jupiter trojans because the first Trojans were discovered near Jupiter's orbit and Jupiter currently has by far the most known Trojans.

== Observational history ==
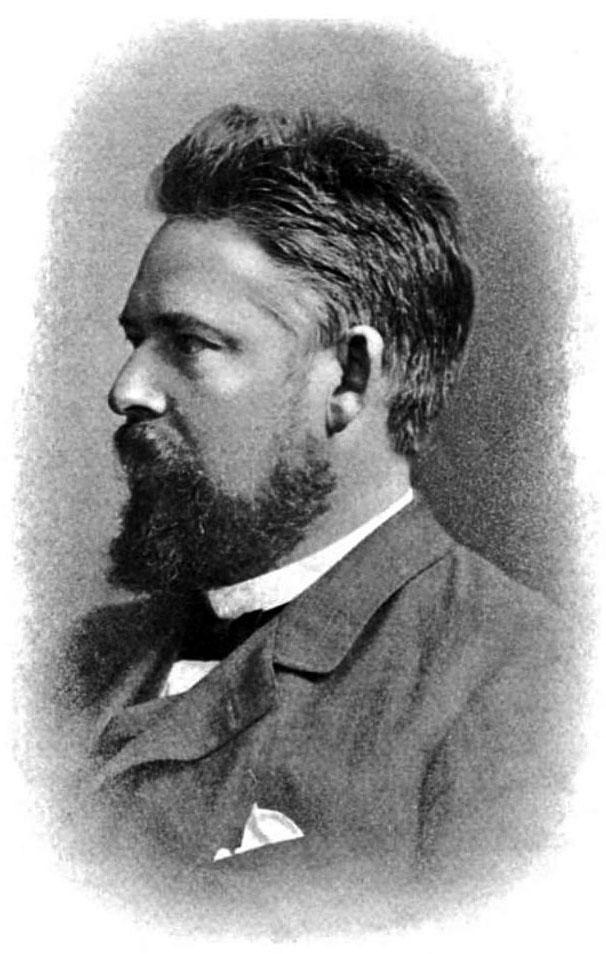
Maximilian Franz Joseph Cornelius Wolf (1890)—the discoverer of the first trojan

In 1772, Italian-born mathematician Joseph-Louis Lagrange, in studying the restricted three-body problem, predicted that a small body sharing an orbit with a planet but lying 60° ahead or behind it will be trapped near these points. The trapped body will librate slowly around the point of equilibrium in a tadpole or horseshoe orbit. These leading and trailing points are called the L_{4} and L_{5} Lagrange points. (Note: The three other points—L_{1}, L_{2} and L_{3}—are unstable.) The first asteroids trapped in Lagrange points were observed more than a century after Lagrange's hypothesis. Those associated with Jupiter were the first to be discovered.

E. E. Barnard made the first recorded observation of a trojan, 12126 Chersidamas (identified as A904 RD at the time), in 1904, but neither he nor others appreciated its significance at the time. Barnard believed he had seen the recently discovered Saturnian satellite Phoebe, which was only two arc-minutes away in the sky at the time, or possibly an asteroid. The object's identity was not understood until its orbit was calculated in 1999.

The first accepted discovery of a trojan occurred in February 1906, when astronomer Max Wolf of Heidelberg-Königstuhl State Observatory discovered an asteroid at the L_{4} Lagrangian point of the Sun–Jupiter system, later named 588 Achilles. In 1906–1907 two more Jupiter trojans were found by fellow German astronomer August Kopff (624 Hektor and 617 Patroclus). Hektor, like Achilles, belonged to the L_{4} swarm ("ahead" of the planet in its orbit), whereas Patroclus was the first asteroid known to reside at the L_{5} Lagrangian point ("behind" the planet). By 1938, 11 Jupiter trojans had been detected. This number increased to 14 only in 1961. As instruments improved, the rate of discovery grew rapidly: by January 2000, a total of 257 had been discovered; by May 2003, the number had grown to 1,600. As of February 2026 there are 9,738 known Jupiter trojans at L_{4} and 5,931 at L_{5}.

== Nomenclature ==
The custom of naming all asteroids in Jupiter's L_{4} and L_{5} points after famous heroes of the Trojan War was suggested by Johann Palisa of Vienna, who was the first to accurately calculate their orbits.

Asteroids in the leading (L_{4}) orbit are named after Greek heroes (the "Greek node or camp" or "Achilles group"), and those at the trailing (L_{5}) orbit are named after the heroes of Troy (the "Trojan node or camp"). The asteroids 617 Patroclus and 624 Hektor were named before the Greece/Troy rule was devised, resulting in a "Greek spy", Patroclus, in the Trojan node and a "Trojan spy", Hector, in the Greek node.

In 2018, at its 30th General Assembly in Vienna, the International Astronomical Union amended the naming convention for Jupiter trojans, allowing for asteroids with H larger than 12 (that is, a mean diameter smaller than approximately 22 kilometers, for an assumed albedo of 0.057) to be named after Olympic or Paralympic athletes, because there are now far more known Jupiter trojans than available names of Greek and Trojan warriors that fought in the Trojan war. As of 4 May 2026, 38 Jupiter trojans have been named after athletes.

List of Jupiter trojans named after Olympic or Paralympic athletes (as of 4 May 2026)

Minor planet	Naming citation	Camp	References
17415 Czesławlang	Czesław Lang (b. 1955) is one of the most famous Polish road-racing cyclists and a prominent promoter of cycling in Poland. Since 1993, he has been the Director of the Tour de Pologne. Lang was also a silver medalist at the 1980 Summer Olympics, and a bronze and silver medalist at the Union Cycliste Internationale's Road World Championships in 1977 and 1979.	Trojan	IAU · 17415
22010 Kuzmina	Anastasiya Kuzmina (b. 1984) is a Russian-born Slovak biathlete who has represented Slovakia since December 2008. She is the first biathlete to win gold medals in three consecutive Winter Olympics (2010 Vancouver, 2014 Sochi and 2018 Pyeongchang).	Greek	IAU · 22010
24426 Belova	Elena Dmitriyevna Novikova-Belova (b. 1947) is a retired fencer from Belarus who became the first woman to win four gold medals during five Olympics from 1968 through 1980. In 2007 she was awarded the Pierre de Coubertin medal by the International Olympic Committee.	Greek	IAU · 24426
25937 Malysz	Adam Małysz (b. 1977) is a Polish ski jumper who won multiple medals at the Olympic games in Salt Lake City (2002) and Vancouver (2010). He is also a four-time winner at the World Championships and the World Cup, and popularized ski jumping in Poland.	Greek	IAU · 25937
25938 Stoch	Kamil Stoch (b. 1987), is a Polish ski jumper, who has won three gold medals at two Olympics (2014 and 2018) and multiple medals at World Championships (2013, 2017 and 2019). He is also a three-time winner of the 4-Hills-Tournament.	Greek	IAU · 25938
28958 Binns	Hilda May (Torok) Binns (b. 1945) is a retired multi-sport athlete who won Canada's first Paralympic gold medal in Tel Aviv in 1968. She won a total of six medals in two Paralympics and many medals and honors in other national and international competitions.	Greek	IAU · 28958
39285 Kipkeino	Kipchoge Keino (b. 1940) won the 1500-m event at the 1968 Olympics by a record-setting margin of 20 meters. His running career spanned 1962 to 1973. After retiring, he and his wife, Phyllis, worked to educate and care for orphans in Kenya. In 2016 he was awarded the first Olympic Laurel for education, culture, development and peace through sport.	Greek	IAU · 39285
39795 Marson	Roberto Marson (1944–2011) was a multi-sport athlete who competed in four Paralympics from 1964 to 1976 winning a total of 26 medals. He was named Outstanding Athlete at the 1968 games after winning ten gold medals. He was added to the International Paralympian Hall of Fame in 2012.	Greek	IAU · 39795
43212 Katosawao	Sawao Katō (b. 1946) competed in three Olympics from 1968 to 1976 winning twelve medals in gymnastics including eight gold medals, the most for any Japanese Olympic athlete. He was inducted into the International Gymnastics Hall of Fame in 2001.	Greek	IAU · 43212
43436 Ansschut	Johanna "Ans" Boekema-Schut (b. 1944) set an Olympic record in speed skating at the 1968 Olympics as a member of the Netherlands Olympic team. She set several world records in international events the following year. She retired from competition in 1971.	Greek	IAU · 43436
57915 Mahuchikh	Yaroslava Mahuchikh (b. 2001) is a Ukrainian high jumper and Olympic champion. After winning bronze at the 2020 Olympics, she claimed gold in 2024. Earlier that year, Yaroslava set a women's high jump world record of 2.10 meters, surpassing a mark that had stood for 36 years.	Greek	IAU · 57915
111571 Bebevio	Beatrice Maria Adelaide Marzia Vio (b. 1997), known as Bebe Vio, is an Italian wheelchair fencer. She won at the 2014 and 2016 European championships, 2015 and 2017 World championships, and 2016 and 2020 Paralympic games in the foil B category. Her enthusiasm and joy for life is an extraordinary example of resilience and rebirth after a difficult illness.	Greek	IAU · 111571
117385 Maughan	Margaret Gardner Maughan (1928–2020) was a British Paralympian. In 1960, she won her nation's first Paralympic gold medal. Margaret lit the cauldron at the 2012 Paralympic Games in London.	Trojan	IAU · 117385
171424 Rudyfernández	Rodolfo 'Rudy' Fernández Farrés (b. 1985) is a Spanish basketball player for Real Madrid. He is a two-time world champion (2006, 2019), a four-time continental champion (2009, 2011, 2015, 2022), and a triple Olympic runner-up (silver in 2008 and 2012, bronze in 2016). He has played in the NBA for Portland and Denver.	Greek	IAU · 171424
247341 Shaulladany	Shaul Paul Ladany (b. 1936) competed as a racewalker for Israel in the 1968 and 1972 Olympics and set the world record for the 50-mile walk in April 1972. He survived the Holocaust and, later, the massacre at the Munich Olympics. In 2007 he was awarded the Pierre de Coubertin Medal and was inducted into the International Jewish Sports Hall of Fame in 2012.	Trojan	IAU · 247341
264068 Gudzinevičiūtė	Daina Gudzinevičiūtė (b. 1965) is an Olympic shooting champion from Lithuania, president of the National Olympic Committee, and a member of the International Olympic Committee. She won the trap-shooting gold medal at the 2000 Summer Olympics in Sydney. Gudzinevičiūtė is respected for her contribution to the development of sport in Lithuania.	Greek	IAU · 264068
264119 Georgeorton	George Washington Orton (1873–1958) was a middle- and long-distance runner. In 1900, he became the first Canadian to win a medal at an Olympic Games.	Greek	IAU · 264119
306001 Joanllaneras	Joan Llaneras Roselló (b. 1969) is a Spanish cyclist who was a two-time Olympic champion and seven-time world champion. He participated in four Olympic Games between 1996 and 2008, winning four medals in total: gold in Sydney 2000; silver in Athens 2004; and gold and silver in Beijing 2008.	Greek	JPL · 306001
310025 Marcuscooper	Marcus Cooper Walz (b. 1994) is an English-born Spanish athlete who competes in flat-water canoeing. He has participated in three Olympic Games, obtaining three medals: gold in Rio de Janeiro 2016 (K1 1000 m event); silver in Tokyo 2020; and bronze in Paris 2024 (K4 500 m event).	Greek	IAU · 310025
312001 Siobhánhaughey	Siobhán Haughey (b. 1997) is a prominent Hong Kong swimmer specializing in freestyle and individual medley events. She has held 99 Hong Kong records and 23 Asian records in her career. Siobhán was the first Hong Kong athlete to win four Olympic medals.	Greek	IAU · 312001
312627 Brigitteyagüe	Brigitte Yagüe Enrique (b. 1981) is a Spanish athlete who competed in taekwondo and won the silver medal at the 2012 London Olympics. She was world champion in 2003, 2007 and 2009, and European champion in 1998, 2002, 2004 and 2008. Brigitte was awarded the Gold Medal of the Royal Order of Sporting Merit in 2010.	Greek	IAU · 312627
315941 Elenagómez	Elena Gómez Servera (b. 1985) is the only Spanish artistic gymnast to have been world champion, winning the gold floor medal at the 2002 World Championships in Hungary. She has won 11 medals in official international competitions, a record for a Spanish female gymnast. She was a member of the Spanish team that finished fifth at the 2004 Athens Olympics.	Greek	IAU · 315941
352655 Alekna	Mykolas Alekna (b. 2002) is a Lithuanian athlete who specializes in the discus throw. He won the silver medal at the Paris Olympic Games in 2024 and is the current men's world record holder of the event with 75.56 meters.	Greek	IAU · 352655
353194 Meilutytė	Rūta Meilutytė (b. 1997) is a Lithuanian swimmer and Olympic champion. She won the gold medal in the 100-m breaststroke at the 2012 London Olympics. Meilutytė has also achieved multiple World and European Championship titles, becoming one of the most successful Lithuanian swimmers in history.	Greek	IAU · 353194
542246 Kulcsár	Győző Kulcsár (1940–2018) was a Hungarian fencer who won four gold and two bronze medals in épée at four Olympic Games between 1964 and 1976. He also won three world titles with the Hungarian team. After retiring from competitions he worked as a fencing coach, his trainees include two Olympic champions.	Greek	IAU · 542246
545564 Sabonis	Arvydas Sabonis (b. 1964) is a retired Lithuanian professional basketball player and businessman. Sabonis won a gold medal at the 1988 Summer Olympics, and bronze medals at the 1992 and 1996 Olympic Games.	Trojan	IAU · 545564
546275 Kozák	Danuta Kozák (b. 1987) is a Hungarian sprint canoeist, who won six gold, one silver and one bronze medals at four Olympic Games between 2008 and 2021. He also won fifteen gold medals at World Championships, and seventeen gold medals at European Championships.	Greek	IAU · 546275
546286 Fuchsjenő	Jenő Fuchs (1882–1955) was a four-time Hungarian Olympic champion saber fencer. He won both the individual and team events at the 1908 and 1912 Olympics. Jenő studied law at the University of Budapest, defended a Ph.D. in 1911, and became a lawyer. In 1982 he was inducted into the International Jewish Sports Hall of Fame.	Greek	IAU · 546286
546396 Szilágyiáron	Áron Szilágyi (b. 1990) is a Hungarian Olympic, European and world champion saber fencer. Since 2017, he has been a goodwill ambassador of the New Europe Foundation. In 2021, he accepted the invitation to become Social Chairman of the Forum for the Protection of Interests of Hungarian Elite Athletes.	Greek	IAU · 546396
567329 Zinaida	Zinaida Voronina, born Zinaida Borisovna Druzhinina (1947–2001), was an artistic gymnast who became the first Olympic champion in the history of Mari sports. At the 1968 Olympics in Mexico City, she won gold, silver and bronze medals.	Greek	JPL · 567329
573759 Rocheva	Nina Rocheva, born Nina Petrovna Selyunina (1948–2022), was a cross-country skier who became the first world champion in the history of Mari sports. She won a silver medal in the 4 × 5 km relay at the 1980 Winter Olympics in Lake Placid, New York.	Greek	IAU · 573759
595901 Lilybeaurepaire	Lillian de Beaurepaire (1892–1979) was an Australian Olympic swimmer and diver. She competed in the 1920 Olympics at Antwerp. She served as a lifesaver at Lorne Beach, Victoria, and is credited with saving 50 people from drowning, including a widely publicized heroic save of three men from rough surf in 1933.	Greek	IAU · 595901
601227 Ammann	Simon Ammann (b. 1981) is a Swiss ski jumper. He is one of the most successful athletes in the history of his sport, having won four individual Winter Olympic gold medals in 2002 and 2010. His other achievements include winning the 2007 Ski Jumping World Championships and the 2010 Ski Flying World Championships.	Greek	IAU · 601227
631626 Benedektibor	Tibor Benedek (1972–2020) was a Hungarian Olympic, European and World champion water polo player. He was captain of the men's national water polo team from 2013 to 2016, and was professional director of the UVSE Water Polo Sports Association from 2017 to 2020. Tibor is a member of the International Swimming Hall of Fame as part of Team Hungary 2000-2008.	Greek	IAU · 631626
724932 Pozniakas	Danas Pozniakas (1939–2005) was a Lithuanian heavyweight boxer and Olympic champion. He won the gold medal at the 1968 Mexico City Summer Olympics. Pozniakas was also a two-time European champion and a prominent figure in international boxing during the 1960s. Pozniakas is remembered as one of Lithuania's greatest boxers of all time.	Greek	IAU · 724932
765015 Marčiulionis	Raimondas Šarūnas Marčiulionis (b. 1964) is a Lithuanian former professional basketball player. Widely considered one of the greatest international players, he was one of the first Europeans to become a regular in the National Basketball Association. He won a gold medal at the 1988 Olympics, and bronze medals at the 1992 and 1996 Olympic Games.	Trojan	IAU · 765015
811110 Ubartas	Romas Ubartas (b. 1960) is a Lithuanian discus thrower and Olympic champion. He won the gold medal at the 1992 Barcelona Summer Olympics, earning Lithuania's first-ever Olympic gold medal. Ubartas also won a silver medal at the 1988 Seoul Summer Olympics and became European champion in 1986. His personal best throw was 70.06 meters.	Greek	IAU · 811110
826856 Commodorecochran	Commodore Shelton Cochran (1902–1969) was the first athlete from Mississippi to win an Olympic gold medal, running the first leg of the USA's 4×400-m relay team at the 1924 Paris games. Cochran attended Mississippi State University, in Starkville, where this asteroid was discovered.	Greek	IAU · 826856

== Numbers and mass ==
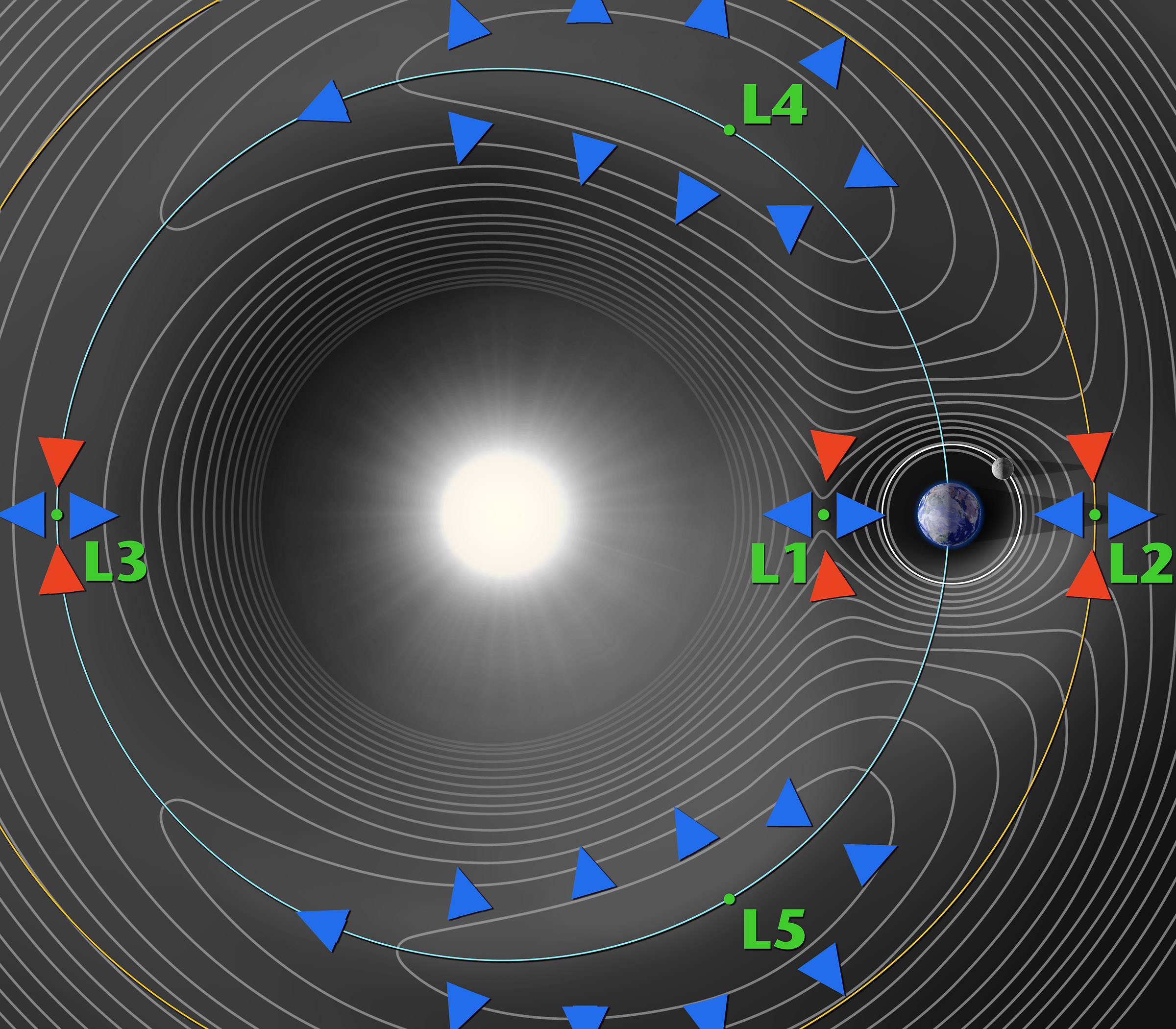
A gravitational potential contour plot showing Earth's Lagrangian points; L_{4} and L_{5} are ahead (above) and behind (below) the planet, respectively. Jupiter's Lagrangian points are similarly situated in its much larger orbit.

Estimates of the total number of Jupiter trojans are based on deep surveys of limited areas of the sky. The L_{4} swarm is believed to hold between 160,000 and 240,000 asteroids with diameters larger than 2 km and about 600,000 with diameters larger than 1 km. If the L_{5} swarm contains a comparable number of objects, there are more than 1 million Jupiter trojans 1 km in size or larger. These numbers are similar to that of comparable asteroids in the asteroid belt. As of 2003, the population was probably complete for the objects brighter than absolute magnitude 9.0. The total mass of the Jupiter trojans is estimated at 0.0001 of the mass of Earth or one-fifth of the mass of the asteroid belt.

Two more recent studies (published in 2008 and 2009) indicate that the above numbers may overestimate the number of Jupiter trojans by several-fold. This overestimate is caused by (1) the assumption that all Jupiter trojans have a low albedo of about 0.04, whereas small bodies may have an average albedo as high as 0.12; (2) an incorrect assumption about the distribution of Jupiter trojans in the sky. According to the new estimates, the total number of Jupiter trojans with a diameter larger than 2 km is 6,300 ± 1,000 and 3,400 ± 500 in the L_{4} and L_{5} swarms, respectively. These numbers would be reduced by a factor of 2 if small Jupiter trojans are more reflective than large ones.

The number of Jupiter trojans observed in the L_{4} swarm is slightly larger than that observed in L_{5}. Because the brightest Jupiter trojans show little variation in numbers between the two populations, this disparity is probably due to observational bias. Some models indicate that the L_{4} swarm may be slightly more stable than the L_{5} swarm.

The largest Jupiter trojan is 624 Hektor, which has a mean diameter of 203 ± 3.6 km. There are few large Jupiter trojans in comparison to the overall population. With decreasing size, the number of Jupiter trojans grows very quickly down to 84 km, much more so than in the asteroid belt. A diameter of 84 km corresponds to an absolute magnitude of 9.5, assuming an albedo of 0.04. Within the 4.4–40 km range the Jupiter trojans' size distribution resembles that of the main-belt asteroids. Nothing is known about the masses of the smaller Jupiter trojans. The size distribution suggests that the smaller Trojans may be the products of collisions by larger Jupiter trojans.

The largest Jupiter trojans
Trojan	Diameter (km)
624 Hektor	225
617 Patroclus	140
911 Agamemnon	131
588 Achilles	130
3451 Mentor	126
3317 Paris	119
1867 Deiphobus	118
1172 Äneas	118
1437 Diomedes	118
1143 Odysseus	115
Source: JPL Small-Body Database, NEOWISE data

== Orbits ==
Animation of the orbit of 624 Hektor (blue), set against the orbit of Jupiter (outer red ellipse)

Jupiter trojans have orbits with radii between 5.05 and 5.35 AU (the mean semi-major axis is 5.2 ± 0.15 AU), and are distributed throughout elongated, curved regions around the two Lagrangian points; each swarm stretches for about 26° along the orbit of Jupiter, amounting to a total distance of about 2.5 AU. The width of the swarms approximately equals two Hill's radii, which in the case of Jupiter amounts to about 0.6 AU. Many of Jupiter trojans have large orbital inclinations relative to Jupiter's orbital plane—up to 40°.

Jupiter trojans do not maintain a fixed separation from Jupiter. They slowly librate around their respective equilibrium points, periodically moving closer to Jupiter or farther from it. Jupiter trojans generally follow paths called tadpole orbits around the Lagrangian points; the average period of their libration is about 150 years. The amplitude of the libration (along the Jovian orbit) varies from 0.6° to 88°, with the average being about 33°. Simulations show that Jupiter trojans can follow even more complicated trajectories when moving from one Lagrangian point to another—these are called horseshoe orbits (currently no Jupiter Trojan with such an orbit is known, though one is known for Neptune).

=== Dynamical families and binaries ===
Discerning dynamical families within the Jupiter trojan population is more difficult than it is in the asteroid belt, because the Jupiter trojans are locked within a far narrower range of possible positions. This means that clusters tend to overlap and merge with the overall swarm. By 2003 roughly a dozen dynamical families were identified. Jupiter-trojan families are much smaller in size than families in the asteroid belt; the largest identified family, the Menelaus group, consists of only eight members.

In 2001, 617 Patroclus was the first Jupiter trojan to be identified as a binary asteroid. The binary's orbit is extremely close, at 650 km, compared to 35,000 km for the primary's Hill sphere. The largest Jupiter trojan—624 Hektor— is probably a contact binary with a moonlet.

== Physical properties ==
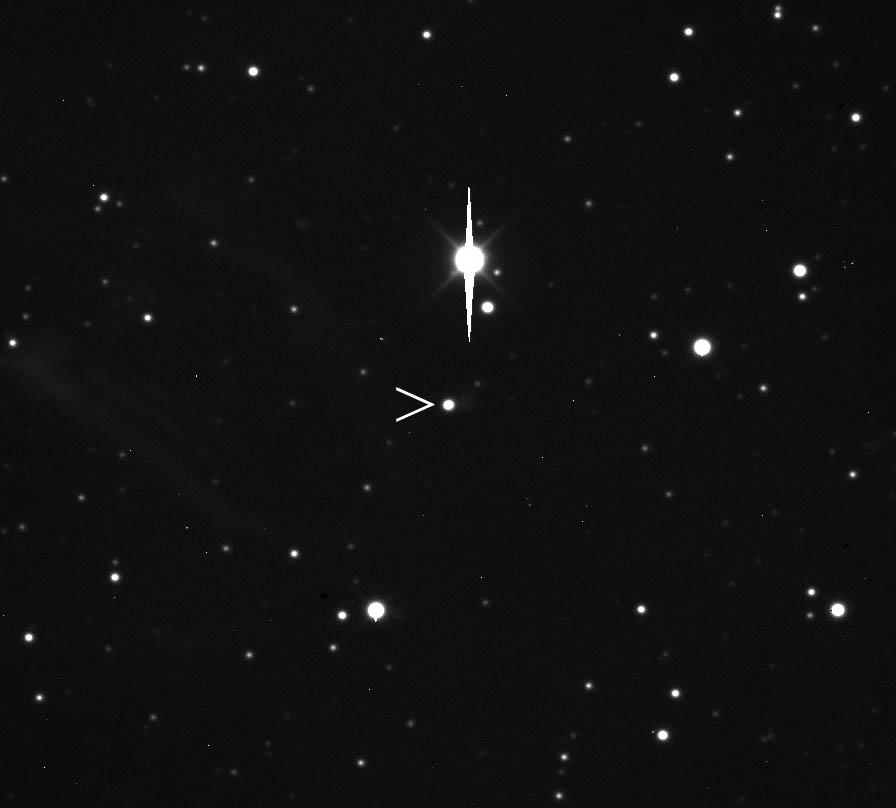
Trojan 624 Hektor (indicated) is similar in brightness to dwarf planet Pluto.

Jupiter trojans are dark bodies of irregular shape. Their geometric albedos generally vary between 3 and 10%. The average value is 0.056 ± 0.003 for the objects larger than 57 km, and 0.121 ± 0.003 (R-band) for those smaller than 25 km. The asteroid 4709 Ennomos has the highest albedo (0.18) of all known Jupiter trojans. Little is known about the masses, chemical composition, rotation or other physical properties of the Jupiter trojans.

=== Rotation ===
The rotational properties of Jupiter trojans are not well known. Analysis of the rotational light curves of 72 Jupiter trojans gave an average rotational period of about 11.2 hours, whereas the average period of the control sample of asteroids in the asteroid belt was 10.6 hours. The distribution of the rotational periods of Jupiter trojans appeared to be well approximated by a Maxwellian function, (Note: The Maxwellian function is $F=\begin{smallmatrix}\frac{1}{\sqrt{2\pi}\sigma}P^2\exp(-(P-P_0)^2/\sigma^2)\end{smallmatrix}$, where $P_0$ is the average rotational period, $\sigma$ is the dispersion of periods.) whereas the distribution for main-belt asteroids was found to be non-Maxwellian, with a deficit of periods in the range 8–10 hours. The Maxwellian distribution of the rotational periods of Jupiter trojans may indicate that they have undergone a stronger collisional evolution compared to the asteroid belt.

In 2008 a team from Calvin College examined the light curves of a debiased sample of ten Jupiter trojans, and found a median spin period of 18.9 hours. This value was significantly higher than that for main-belt asteroids of similar size (11.5 hours). The difference could mean that the Jupiter trojans possess a lower average density, which may imply that they formed in the Kuiper belt (see below).

=== Composition ===
Spectroscopically, the Jupiter trojans mostly are D-type asteroids, which predominate in the outer regions of the asteroid belt. A small number are classified as P or C-type asteroids. Their spectra are red (meaning that they reflect more light at longer wavelengths) or neutral and featureless. No firm evidence of water, organics or other chemical compounds has been obtained as of 2007. 4709 Ennomos has an albedo slightly higher than the Jupiter-trojan average, which may indicate the presence of water ice. Some other Jupiter Trojans, such as 911 Agamemnon and 617 Patroclus, have shown very weak absorptions at 1.7 and 2.3 μm, which might indicate the presence of organics. The Jupiter trojans' spectra are similar to those of the irregular moons of Jupiter and, to a certain extent, comet nuclei, though Jupiter trojans are spectrally very different from the redder Kuiper belt objects. A Jupiter trojan's spectrum can be matched to a mixture of water ice, a large amount of carbon-rich material (charcoal), and possibly magnesium-rich silicates. The composition of the Jupiter trojan population appears to be markedly uniform, with little or no differentiation between the two swarms.

A team from the Keck Observatory in Hawaii announced in 2006 that it had measured the density of the binary Jupiter trojan 617 Patroclus as being less than that of water ice (0.8 g/cm^{3}), suggesting that the pair, and possibly many other Trojan objects, more closely resemble comets or Kuiper belt objects in composition—water ice with a layer of dust—than they do the main-belt asteroids. Countering this argument, the density of Hektor as determined from its rotational lightcurve (2.480 g/cm^{3}) is significantly higher than that of 617 Patroclus. Such a difference in densities suggests that density may not be a good indicator of asteroid origin.

== Origin and evolution ==
Two main theories have emerged to explain the formation and evolution of the Jupiter trojans. The first suggests that the Jupiter trojans formed in the same part of the Solar System as Jupiter and entered their orbits while it was forming. The last stage of Jupiter's formation involved runaway growth of its mass through the accretion of large amounts of hydrogen and helium from the protoplanetary disk; during this growth, which lasted for only about 10,000 years, the mass of Jupiter increased by a factor of ten. The planetesimals that had approximately the same orbits as Jupiter were caught by the increased gravity of the planet. The capture mechanism was very efficient—about 50% of all remaining planetesimals were trapped. This hypothesis has two major problems: the number of trapped bodies exceeds the observed population of Jupiter trojans by four orders of magnitude, and the present Jupiter trojan asteroids have larger orbital inclinations than are predicted by the capture model. Simulations of this scenario show that such a mode of formation also would inhibit the creation of similar trojans for Saturn, and this has been borne out by observation: to date no trojans have been found near Saturn. In a variation of this theory Jupiter captures trojans during its initial growth then migrates as it continues to grow. During Jupiter's migration the orbits of objects in horseshoe orbits are distorted causing the L4 side of these orbits to be over occupied. As a result, an excess of trojans is trapped on the L4 side when the horseshoe orbits shift to tadpole orbits as Jupiter grows. This model also leaves the Jupiter trojan population 3–4 orders of magnitude too large.

The second theory proposes that the Jupiter trojans were captured during the migration of the giant planets described in the Nice model. In the Nice model the orbits of the giant planets became unstable 500–600 million years after the Solar System's formation when Jupiter and Saturn crossed their 1:2 mean-motion resonance. Encounters between planets resulted in Uranus and Neptune being scattered outward into the primordial Kuiper belt, disrupting it and throwing millions of objects inward. When Jupiter and Saturn were near their 1:2 resonance the orbits of pre-existing Jupiter trojans became unstable during a secondary resonance with Jupiter and Saturn. This occurred when the period of the trojans' libration about their Lagrangian point had a 3:1 ratio to the period at which the position where Jupiter passes Saturn circulated relative to its perihelion. This process was also reversible allowing a fraction of the numerous objects scattered inward by Uranus and Neptune to enter this region and be captured as Jupiter's and Saturn's orbits separated. These new trojans had a wide range of inclinations, the result of multiple encounters with the giant planets before being captured. This process can also occur later when Jupiter and Saturn cross weaker resonances.

In a revised version of the Nice model Jupiter trojans are captured when Jupiter encounters an ice giant during the instability. In this version of the Nice model one of the ice giants (Uranus, Neptune, or a lost fifth planet) is scattered inward onto a Jupiter-crossing orbit and is scattered outward by Jupiter causing the orbits of Jupiter and Saturn to quickly separate. When Jupiter's semi-major axis jumps during these encounters existing Jupiter trojans can escape and new objects with semi-major axes similar to Jupiter's new semi-major axis are captured. Following its last encounter the ice giant can pass through one of the libration points and perturb their orbits leaving this libration point depleted relative to the other. After the encounters end some of these Jupiter trojans are lost and others captured when Jupiter and Saturn are near weak mean motion resonances such as the 3:7 resonance via the mechanism of the original Nice model.

The long-term future of the Jupiter trojans is open to question, because multiple weak resonances with Jupiter and Saturn cause them to behave chaotically over time. Collisional shattering slowly depletes the Jupiter trojan population as fragments are ejected. Ejected Jupiter trojans could become temporary satellites of Jupiter or Jupiter-family comets. Simulations show that the orbits of up to 17% of Jupiter trojans are unstable over the age of the Solar System. Levison et al. believe that roughly 200 ejected Jupiter trojans greater than 1 km in diameter might be travelling the Solar System, with a few possibly on Earth-crossing orbits. Some of the escaped Jupiter trojans may become Jupiter-family comets as they approach the Sun and their surface ice begins evaporating.

== Exploration ==
On 4 January 2017 NASA announced that Lucy was selected as one of their next two Discovery Program missions. Lucy is set to explore seven Jupiter trojans. It was launched on October 16, 2021, and will arrive at the L_{4} Trojan cloud in 2027 after two Earth gravity assists and a fly-by of a main-belt asteroid. It will then return to the vicinity of Earth for another gravity assist to take it to Jupiter's L_{5} Trojan cloud where it will visit 617 Patroclus.

== See also ==
- Comet Shoemaker–Levy 9
- List of Jupiter trojans (Greek camp)
- List of Jupiter trojans (Trojan camp)
- List of Jupiter-crossing minor planets
- List of objects at Lagrangian points
