= Bruce Simonson =

Bruce Simonson is an American planetary scientist and geologist notable for his contributions to meteoroid astronomy and glaciology. He is credited as one of the foremost experts in glacial till plains as well as one of the developers of the E-belt model. He has served as professor of geology at Oberlin College since 1979.
