= Nice model =

Scenario for the dynamical evolution of the Solar System

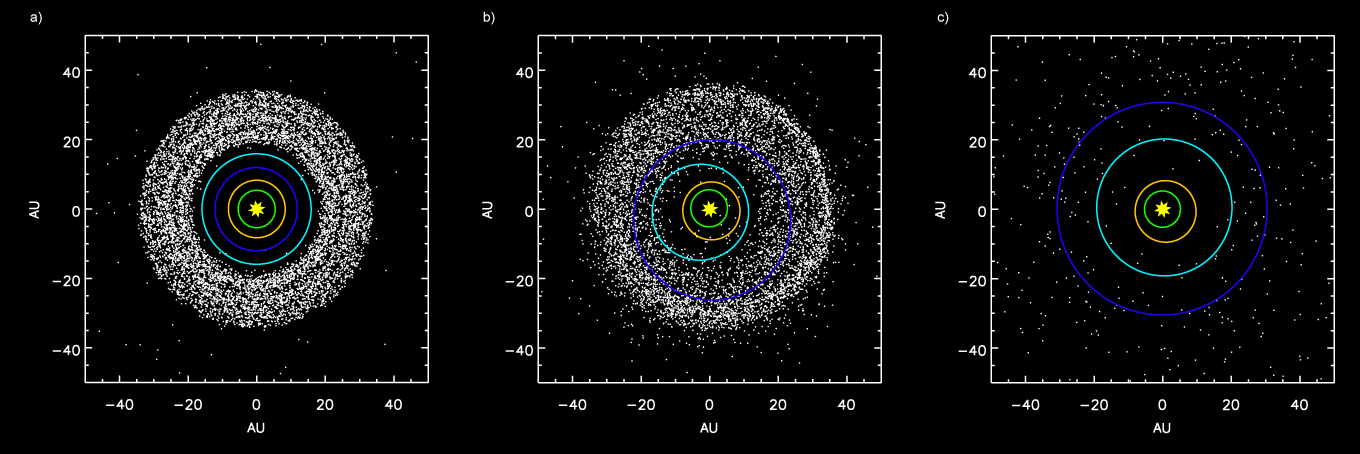
Simulation showing the outer planets and planetesimal belt: (a) early configuration, before Jupiter and Saturn reach a 2:1 resonance; (b) scattering of planetesimals into the inner Solar System after the orbital shift of Neptune (dark blue) and Uranus (light blue); (c) after ejection of planetesimals by planets.

In astronomy, the Nice (/ˈniːs/) model is a scenario for the dynamical evolution of the Solar System. It is named for the location of the Côte d'Azur Observatory—where it was initially developed in 2005—in Nice, France. It proposes the migration of the giant planets from an initial compact configuration into their present positions, long after the dissipation of the initial protoplanetary disk. In this way, it differs from earlier models of the Solar System's formation. This planetary migration is used in dynamical simulations of the Solar System to explain historical events including the Late Heavy Bombardment of the inner Solar System, the formation of the Oort cloud, and the existence of populations of small Solar System bodies such as the Kuiper belt, the Neptune and Jupiter trojans, and the numerous resonant trans-Neptunian objects dominated by Neptune.

== Description ==
The original core of the Nice model is a triplet of papers published in the general science journal Nature in 2005 by an international collaboration of scientists. In these publications, the four authors proposed that after the dissipation of the gas and dust of the primordial Solar System disk, the four giant planets (Jupiter, Saturn, Uranus, and Neptune) were originally found on near-circular orbits with radii between 5.5~17 astronomical units (AU), closer to the sun than the present distance of Uranus, and much more closely spaced and compact than in the present. A large, dense disk of small rock and "ice" planetesimals totalling about 35 Earth masses extended from the orbit of the outermost giant planet to some 35 AU from the sun.

According to the Nice model, the planetary system evolved in the following manner: Planetesimals at the disk's inner edge occasionally pass through gravitational encounters with the outermost giant planet (Uranus or Neptune), which change the planetesimals' orbits. The planet scatters inward the majority of the small icy bodies that it encounters, which in turn moves the planet outwards in response as it acquires angular momentum from the scattered objects. The inward-deflected planetesimals successively encounter Uranus, Neptune, and Saturn (or Neptune, then Uranus, then Saturn), moving each outwards in turn by the same process. Despite the minute orbit change each exchange of momentum produces, cumulatively these planetesimal encounters shift (migrate) the orbits of the planets by significant amounts. This process continues until the planetesimals interact with the innermost and most massive giant planet, Jupiter, whose immense gravity sends them into highly elliptical orbits or even ejects them outright from the Solar system. This, by contrast, causes Jupiter to move slightly inward.

The low rate of orbital encounters governs the rate at which planetesimals are lost from the disk, and the corresponding rate of migration. After several hundred million years of slow, gradual migration, Jupiter and Saturn, the two inmost giant planets, reach their mutual 1:2 mean-motion resonance, meaning that the period of Saturn is twice that of Jupiter. This resonance increases their orbital eccentricities, destabilizing the entire planetary system. The arrangement of the giant planets alters quickly and dramatically. Jupiter shifts Saturn out towards its present position, and this relocation causes mutual gravitational encounters between Saturn and the two ice giants, which propel Neptune and Uranus onto much more eccentric orbits. These ice giants then plough into the planetesimal disk, scattering tens of thousands of planetesimals from their formerly stable orbits in the outer Solar System. This disruption almost entirely scatters the primordial disk, removing 99% of its mass. Although the scenario explains the absence of a dense trans-Neptunian population, alternative models that achieve the same depletion of trans-Saturnian asteroids, but without planet migration or chaotic resonances, have been proposed.

The details of the calculations of the Nice model are sensitive to chaotic interactions between planets and asteroids. Such calculations are notoriously plagued by numerical errors, in particular round-off and time discretisation errors. Originally it was thought that the model would cause some of the planetesimals to be thrown into the inner Solar System, producing a sudden influx of impacts on the terrestrial planets: the Late Heavy Bombardment (LHB). However, it has since been demonstrated that the LHB is inconsistent with the age and abundance of craters on the asteroid Vesta, and that the original lunar observations were the result of statistical aberrations in crater age determination.

Following the Nice model, the giant planets eventually reach their final orbital semi-major axes, and dynamical friction with the remaining planetesimal disc damps their eccentricities and makes the orbits of Uranus and Neptune circular again.

In some 50% of the initial models of Tsiganis and colleagues, Neptune and Uranus also exchange places. Such statistics, however, cannot be interpreted as a probability in a dynamically chaotic system. Although, an exchange of Uranus and Neptune would be consistent with models of their formation in a disk that had a surface density that declined with distance from the Sun, there is no compelling argument why planet mass should follow the disc's density profile.

Example Nice Model simulation of the migration of the solar distance of the four giant planets.

== Solar System features ==
Running dynamical models of the Solar System with different initial conditions for the simulated length of the history of the Solar System produce various distributions of minor bodies in the Solar System. In order to explain the wide variety of object families in their respective observed abundances, a wide range of initial conditions for the Solar System are necessary. This diversity in initial conditions renders the model inpractical and suspect, because there can only be one realization of the early Solar System: that realization should explain all the families of minor bodies in their observed abundances.

Proving a model of the evolution of the early Solar System is difficult, since the evolution cannot be directly observed. However, the success of any dynamical model can be judged by comparing the population predictions from the simulations to astronomical observations of these populations. At the present time, there is no satisfactory computer model that explains the current Solar System's architecture.

=== The Late Heavy Bombardment ===
The main motivation for the introduction of the Nice model is to explain the Late Heavy Bombardment (LHB), a hypothetical surge in asteroid impacts and crater formation on the lunar surface and the terrestrial planets at about 600 million years after the Solar System's formation. However, newer studies on the age of lunar craters show no peak in the cratering record, but rather an exponential decay of the number of craters with time. The surge may be a statistical artifact, with a finite uncertainty on the determination of a crater's age combining with the cutoff age of the moon to create an apparent peak in the inferred age distribution, the LHB. Also recent measurements by laser ablation microprobe of the argon 40 to argon 39 isotope ratio on the surface of Vesta are in considerable tension with the LHB.

The Nice model would explain the LHB as follows.

Icy planetesimals are scattered onto planet-crossing orbits when the outer disc is disrupted by Uranus and Neptune, causing a sharp spike of impacts by icy objects. The migration of outer planets also causes mean-motion and secular resonances to sweep through the inner Solar System. In the asteroid belt these excite the eccentricities of the asteroids driving them onto orbits that intersect those of the terrestrial planets causing a more extended period of impacts by stony objects and removing roughly 90% of its mass. The number of planetesimals that would reach the Moon is consistent with the crater record from the LHB. However, the predicted orbital distribution of the remaining asteroids does not match observations. In the outer Solar System the impacts onto Jupiter's moons are sufficient to melt material on Ganymede, causing separation of the metals, rocks, and ices, but not Callisto, being further away from Jupiter and therefore being hit at lower speeds. The impacts of icy planetesimals onto Saturn's inner moons are excessive, however, resulting in the vaporization of their ices.

The strong doubts about the LHB as a unique phase in the Solar System's early evolution also weaken the credibility of the Nice Model.

=== Trojans and the asteroid belt ===
After Jupiter and Saturn cross the 2:1 resonance their combined gravitational influence destabilizes the trojan co-orbital region allowing existing trojan groups in the L_{4} and L_{5} Lagrange points of Jupiter and Neptune to escape and new objects from the outer planetesimal disk to be captured. Objects in the trojan co-orbital region undergo libration, drifting cyclically relative to the L_{4} and L_{5} points. When Jupiter and Saturn are near but not in resonance, the location at which Jupiter passes Saturn relative to their perihelia circulates slowly. If the period of this circulation falls into resonance with the period at which the trojans librate, then the libration range can increase until they escape. When this phenomenon occurs, the trojan co-orbital region is "dynamically open" and objects can both escape and enter it. Primordial trojans escape and a fraction of the numerous objects from the disrupted planetesimal disk temporarily inhabit it. Later when the separation of the Jupiter and Saturn orbits increases, the trojan region becomes "dynamically closed", and the planetesimals in the trojan region are captured, with many remaining today. The captured trojans have a wide range of inclinations due to their repeated encounters with the giant planets which had not previously been understood. The libration amplitudes and eccentricities of the simulated population also matches observations of the orbits of the Jupiter trojans. This mechanism of the Nice model similarly generates the Neptune trojans.

A large number of planetesimals would have also been captured in Jupiter's mean motion resonances as Jupiter migrated inward. Those that remained in a 3:2 resonance with Jupiter form the Hilda family. The eccentricity of other objects declined while they were in a resonance and escaped onto stable orbits in the outer asteroid belt, at distances greater than 2.6 AU as the resonances moved inward. These captured objects would then have undergone collisional erosion, grinding the population away into progressively smaller fragments that can then be subject to the Yarkovsky effect, which causes small objects to drift into unstable resonances, and to the Poynting–Robertson drag which causes smaller grains to drift toward the sun. These processes may have removed >90% of the original mass implanted into the asteroid belt. The size-frequency distribution of this simulated population following this erosion are in excellent agreement with observations. This agreement suggests that the Jupiter trojans, Hildas, and spectral D-type asteroids such as some objects in the outer asteroid belt, are remnant planetesimals from this capture and erosion process. The dwarf planet 1 Ceres may be a Kuiper-belt object that was captured by this process. A few recently discovered D-type asteroids have semi-major axes < 2.5 AU, which is closer than those that would be captured in the original Nice Model.

=== Outer-system satellites ===
Any original populations of irregular satellites captured by traditional mechanisms, such as drag or impacts from the accretion disks, would be lost during the encounters between the planets at the time of global system instability. In the Nice model, the outer planets encounter large numbers of planetesimals after Uranus and Neptune enter and disrupt the planetesimal disk. A fraction of these planetesimals are captured by these planets via three-way interactions during encounters between two planets, such as Uranus and Neptune. The probability for a particular planetesimal to be captured by an ice giant is a few times 10^{−7}. These new satellites could be captured at almost any angle, so unlike the regular satellites of Saturn, Uranus, and Neptune, they do not necessarily orbit in the planets' equatorial planes. Some irregulars may have even been exchanged between planets. The resulting irregular orbits match well with the observed populations' semimajor axes, inclinations, and eccentricities, but do not explain the irregular moons of Jupiter (see below). Subsequent collisions between these captured satellites may have created the suspected collisional families seen today. These collisions are also required to erode the population to the present size distribution.

Triton, the largest moon of Neptune, can be explained if it was captured in a three-body interaction involving the disruption of a binary planetoid. Such binary disruption would be more likely if Triton was the smaller member of the binary. However, Triton's capture would be more likely in the early Solar System when the gas disk would damp relative velocities, and binary exchange reactions would not in general have supplied the large number of small irregulars.

There were not enough interactions between Jupiter and the other planets to explain Jupiter's retinue of irregulars in the initial Nice model simulations that reproduced other aspects of the outer Solar System. This suggests either that a second mechanism was at work for that planet, or that the early simulations did not reproduce the evolution of the giant planets' orbits.

=== Formation of the Kuiper belt ===
The migration of the outer planets is also necessary to account for the existence and properties of the Solar System's outermost regions. Originally, the Kuiper belt was much denser and closer to the Sun, with an outer edge at approximately 30 AU. Its inner edge would have been just beyond the orbits of Uranus and Neptune, which were in turn far closer to the Sun when they formed (most likely in the range of 15–20 AU), and in opposite locations, with Uranus farther from the Sun than Neptune.

Gravitational encounters between the planets scatter Neptune outward into the planetesimal disk with a semi-major axis of ~28 AU and an eccentricity as high as 0.4. Neptune's high eccentricity causes its mean-motion resonances to overlap and orbits in the region between Neptune and its 2:1 mean motion resonances to become chaotic. The orbits of objects between Neptune and the edge of the planetesimal disk at this time can evolve outward onto stable low-eccentricity orbits within this region. When Neptune's eccentricity is damped by dynamical friction they become trapped on these orbits. These objects form a dynamically cold belt, since their inclinations remain small during the short time they interact with Neptune. Later, as Neptune migrates outward on a low eccentricity orbit, objects that have been scattered outward are captured into its resonances and can have their eccentricities decline and their inclinations increase due to the Kozai mechanism, allowing them to escape onto stable higher-inclination orbits. Other objects remain captured in resonance, forming the plutinos and other resonant populations. These two populations are dynamically hot, with higher inclinations and eccentricities; due to their being scattered outward and the longer period these objects interact with Neptune.

This evolution of Neptune's orbit produces both resonant and non-resonant populations, an outer edge at Neptune's 2:1 resonance, and a small mass relative to the original planetesimal disk. The excess of low-inclination plutinos in other models is avoided due to Neptune being scattered outward, leaving its 3:2 resonance beyond the original edge of the planetesimal disk. The differing initial locations, with the cold classical objects originating primarily from the outer disk, and capture processes, offer explanations for the bi-modal inclination distribution and its correlation with compositions. However, this evolution of Neptune's orbit fails to account for some of the characteristics of the orbital distribution. It predicts a greater average eccentricity in classical Kuiper belt object orbits than is observed (0.10–0.13 versus 0.07) and it does not produce enough higher-inclination objects. It also cannot explain the apparent complete absence of gray objects in the cold population, although it has been suggested that color differences arise in part from surface evolution processes rather than entirely from differences in primordial composition.

The shortage of the lowest-eccentricity objects predicted in the Nice model may indicate that the cold population formed in situ. In addition to their differing orbits the hot and cold populations have differing colors. The cold population is markedly redder than the hot, suggesting it has a different composition and formed in a different region. The cold population also includes a large number of binary objects with loosely bound orbits that would be unlikely to survive close encounter with Neptune. If the cold population formed at its current location, preserving it would require that Neptune's eccentricity remained small, or that its perihelion precessed rapidly due to a strong interaction between it and Uranus.

=== Scattered disc and Oort cloud ===
Objects scattered outward by Neptune onto orbits with semi-major axis greater than 50 AU can be captured in resonances forming the resonant population of the scattered disc, or if their eccentricities are reduced while in resonance they can escape from the resonance onto stable orbits in the scattered disc while Neptune is migrating. When Neptune's eccentricity is large its aphelion can reach well beyond its current orbit. Objects that attain perihelia close to or larger than Neptune's at this time can become detached from Neptune when its eccentricity is damped reducing its aphelion, leaving them on stable orbits in the scattered disc.

Objects scattered outward by Uranus and Neptune onto larger orbits (roughly 5,000 AU) can have their perihelion raised by the galactic tide detaching them from the influence of the planets forming the inner Oort cloud with moderate inclinations. Others that reach even larger orbits can be perturbed by nearby stars forming the outer Oort cloud with isotropic inclinations. Objects scattered by Jupiter and Saturn are typically ejected from the Solar System. Several percent of the initial planetesimal disc can be deposited in these reservoirs.

== Modifications ==
The Nice model has undergone a number of modifications since its initial publication. Some changes reflect a better understanding of the formation of the Solar System while others were made after significant differences between its predictions and observations were identified. Hydrodynamical models of the early Solar System indicate that the orbits of the giant planets would converge resulting in their capture into a series of resonances. The slow approach of Jupiter and Saturn to the 2:1 resonance before the instability and the smooth separation of their orbits afterwards was also shown to alter the orbits of objects in the inner Solar System due to sweeping secular resonances. The first could result in the orbit of Mars crossing that of the other terrestrial planets, destabilizing the inner Solar System. If the first was avoided the latter would still leave the orbits of the terrestrial planets with larger eccentricities. The orbital distribution of the asteroid belt would also be altered leaving it with an excess of high inclination objects. Other differences between predictions and observations included the capture of few irregular satellites by Jupiter, the vaporization of the ice from Saturn's inner moons, a shortage of high inclination objects captured in the Kuiper belt, and the recent discovery of D-type asteroids in the inner asteroid belt.

The first modifications to the Nice model were the initial positions of the giant planets. Investigations of the behavior of planets orbiting in a gas disk using hydrodynamical models reveal that the giant planets would migrate toward the Sun. If the migration continued it would have resulted in Jupiter orbiting close to the Sun like recently discovered exoplanets known as hot Jupiters. Saturn's capture in a resonance with Jupiter prevents this, however, and the later capture of the other planets results in a quadruple resonant configuration with Jupiter and Saturn in their 3:2 resonance. A mechanism for a delayed disruption of this resonance was also proposed. Gravitational encounters with Pluto-massed objects in the outer disk would stir their orbits causing an increase in eccentricities, and through a coupling of their orbits, an inward migration of the giant planets. During this inward migration secular resonances would be crossed that altered the eccentricities of the planets' orbits and disrupted the quadruple resonance. A late instability similar to the original Nice model then follows. Unlike the original Nice model the timing of this instability is not sensitive to the planets' initial orbits or the distance between the outer planet and the planetesimal disk. The combination of resonant planetary orbits and the late instability triggered by these long distance interactions was referred to as the Nice 2 model.

The second modification was the requirement that one of the ice giants encounter Jupiter, causing its semi-major axis to jump. In this jumping-Jupiter scenario, an ice giant encounters Saturn and is scattered inward onto a Jupiter-crossing orbit, causing Saturn's orbit to expand; it then encounters Jupiter and is scattered outward, causing Jupiter's orbit to shrink. This results in a step-wise separation of the orbits of Jupiter and Saturn, instead of a smooth divergent migration. The step-wise separation of the orbits of Jupiter and Saturn avoids the slow sweeping of secular resonances across the inner solar System that increases the eccentricities of the terrestrial planets and leaves the asteroid belt with an excessive ratio of high- to low-inclination objects. The encounters between the ice giant and Jupiter in this model allow Jupiter to acquire its own irregular satellites. Jupiter trojans are also captured following these encounters when Jupiter's semi-major axis jumps and, if the ice giant passes through one of the libration points scattering trojans, one population is depleted relative to the other. The faster traverse of the secular resonances across the asteroid belt limits the loss of asteroids from its core. Most of the rocky impactors of the Late Heavy Bombardment instead originate from an inner extension that is disrupted when the giant planets reach their current positions, with a remnant remaining as the Hungaria asteroids. Some D-type asteroids are embedded in the inner asteroid belt, within 2.5 AU, during encounters with the ice giant when it is crossing the asteroid belt.

== Five-planet Nice model ==
The frequent ejection in simulations of the ice giant encountering Jupiter has led David Nesvorný and others to hypothesize an early Solar System with five giant planets, one of which was ejected during the instability. This five-planet Nice model begins with the giant planets in a 3:2, 3:2, 2:1, 3:2 resonant chain with a planetesimal disk orbiting beyond them. Following the breaking of the resonant chain Neptune first migrates outward into the planetesimal disk reaching 28 AU before encounters between planets begin. This initial migration reduces the mass of the outer disk enabling Jupiter's eccentricity to be preserved and produces a Kuiper belt with an inclination distribution that matches observations if 20 Earth-masses remained in the planetesimal disk when that migration began. Neptune's eccentricity can remain small during the instability since it only encounters the ejected ice giant, allowing an in situ cold-classical belt to be preserved. The lower mass planetesimal belt in combination with the excitation of inclinations and eccentricities by the Pluto-massed objects also significantly reduce the loss of ices by Saturn's inner moons. The combination of a late breaking of the resonance chain and a migration of Neptune to 28 AU before the instability is unlikely with the Nice 2 model. This gap may be bridged by a slow dust-driven migration over several million years following an early escape from resonance. A 2015 study found that the five-planet Nice model has a statistically small likelihood of reproducing the orbits of the terrestrial planets. Although this implies that the instability occurred before the formation of the terrestrial planets and could not be the source of the Late Heavy Bombardment, the advantage of an early instability is reduced by the sizable jumps in the semi-major axis of Jupiter and Saturn required to preserve the asteroid belt.

== See also ==
- Formation and evolution of the Solar System
- Grand tack hypothesis
- Jumping-Jupiter scenario
- Late Heavy Bombardment
- Planetary migration
