= Alessandro Morbidelli (astronomer) =

Italian astronomer (born 1966)

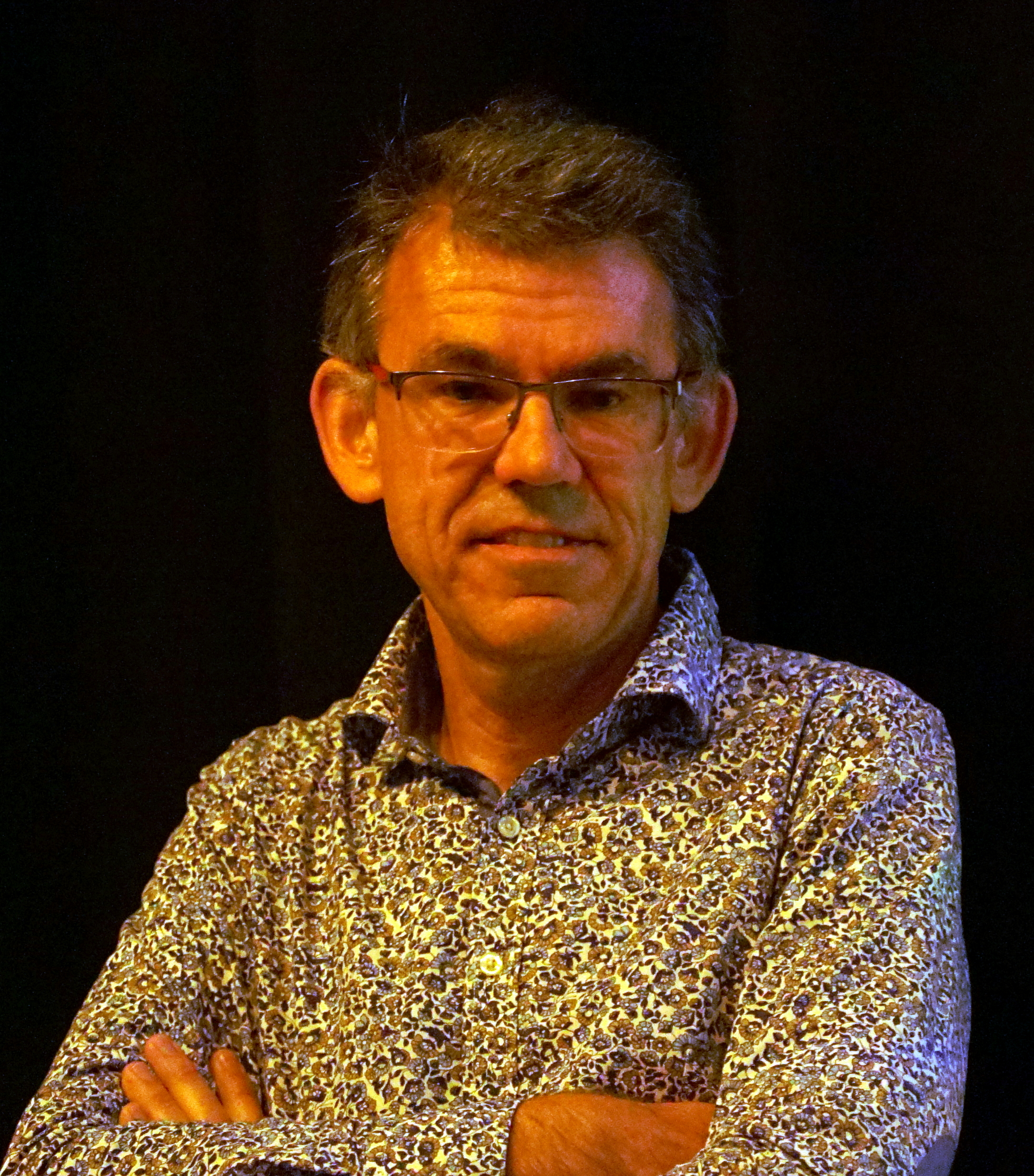
- Born: May 2, 1966 (age 60); Turin, Italy
- Education: University of Namur (FUNDP)
- Known for: Theories on the early history of the Solar System
- Awards: Urey Prize of the American Astronomical Society; Prix Jules Janssen of the Société astronomique de France (2018)
- Scientific career
- Fields: Planetary science, astrophysics, astronomy
- Workplaces: CNRS, Observatoire de la Cote d'Azur

Alessandro Morbidelli (born May 2, 1966) is an Italian astronomer and planetary scientist who is currently employed by the Observatoire de la Cote d'Azur in Nice. Morbidelli specialises in Solar System dynamics, especially planetary formation and migration and the structure of the asteroid and Kuiper belts.

== Awards ==
- 2000 Urey Prize from the Division for Planetary Sciences of the American Astronomical Society
- 2015 elected a foreign member of the French Académie des Sciences
- 2018 Harold Jeffreys Lectureship of the Royal Astronomical Society
- 2018 Prix Jules Janssen from the Société astronomique de France.

== Publications ==
- Jewitt D., Morbidelli A., Rauer H., "Trans-Neptunian Objects and Comets", Springer, 2008
