= Secular resonance =

A secular resonance is a type of orbital resonance between two bodies with synchronized precessional frequencies. In celestial mechanics, secular refers to the long-term motion of a system, and resonance is periods or frequencies being a simple numerical ratio of small integers. Typically, the synchronized precessions in secular resonances are between the rates of change of the argument of the periapses or the rates of change of the longitude of the ascending nodes of two system bodies. Secular resonances can be used to study the long-term orbital evolution of asteroids and their families within the asteroid belt.

== Description ==
Secular resonances occur when the precession of two orbits is synchronised (a precession of the perihelion, with frequency g, or the ascending node, with frequency s, or both). A small body (such as a small Solar System body) in secular resonance with a much larger one (such as a planet) will precess at the same rate as the large body. Over relatively short time periods (a million years or so), a secular resonance will change the eccentricity and the inclination of the small body.

One can distinguish between:

- linear secular resonances between a body (no subscript) and a single other large perturbing body (e.g. a planet, subscript as numbered from the Sun), such as the ν_{6} = g − g_{6} secular resonance between asteroids and Saturn; and
- nonlinear secular resonances, which are higher-order resonances, usually combination of linear resonances such as the z_{1} = (g − g_{6}) + (s − s_{6}), or the ν_{6} + ν_{5} = 2g − g_{6} − g_{5} resonances.

=== ν_{6} resonance ===
A prominent example of a linear resonance is the ν_{6} secular resonance between asteroids and Saturn. This occurs when ν_{6} = g − g_{6} is zero, meaning that the perihelion of the asteroid moves slowly around the sun at the same rate as the perihelion of Saturn. Asteroids that approach Saturn have their eccentricity slowly increased until they become Mars-crossers, when they are usually ejected from the asteroid belt by a close encounter with Mars. The resonance forms the inner and "side" boundaries of the asteroid belt around 2 AU and at inclinations of about 20°.

== See also ==
- Orbital resonance
- Asteroid belt
