= IC 5146 =

Reflection nebula in the constellation Cygnus

Reflection nebula
- emission nebula
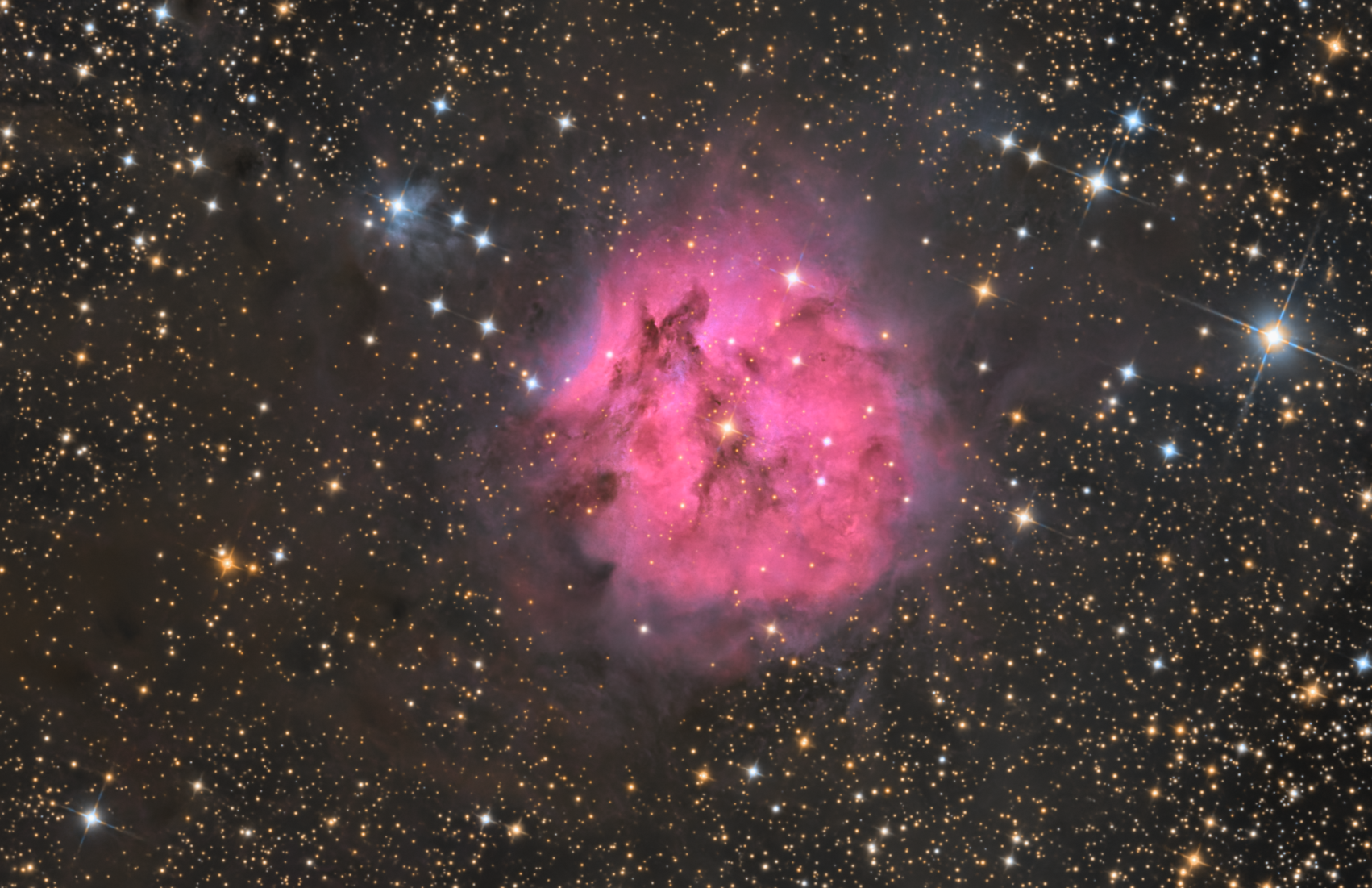
- Taken By Hunter Outten (Outten Astrophotography)

Observation data: J2000 epoch
- Right ascension: 21^{h} 53^{m} 28.7^{s}
- Declination: +47° 16′ 01″
- Distance: 2500±100 ly (780±30 pc)
- Apparent magnitude (V): +7.2
- Apparent dimensions (V): 12′
- Constellation: Cygnus

Physical characteristics
- Radius: 7.5 ly
- Designations: Cocoon Nebula, Caldwell 19, Sh 2-125, Cr 470

IC 5146 (also Caldwell 19, Sh 2-125, Barnard 168, and the Cocoon Nebula) is a reflection/emission nebula and Caldwell object in the constellation Cygnus. The NGC description refers to IC 5146 as a cluster of 9.5 mag stars involved in a bright and dark nebula. The cluster is also known as Collinder 470. It shines at magnitude +10.0/+9.3/+7.2. Its celestial coordinates are RA 21^{h} 53.5^{m} , dec +47° 16′. It is located near the naked-eye star Pi Cygni, the open cluster NGC 7209 in Lacerta, and the bright open cluster M39. The cluster is about 4,000 ly away, and the central star that lights it formed about 100,000 years ago; the nebula is about 12 arcmins across, which is equivalent to a span of 15 light years.

When viewing IC 5146, dark nebula Barnard 168 (B168) is an inseparable part of the experience, forming a dark lane that surrounds the cluster and projects westward forming the appearance of a trail behind the Cocoon.

== Young stellar objects ==
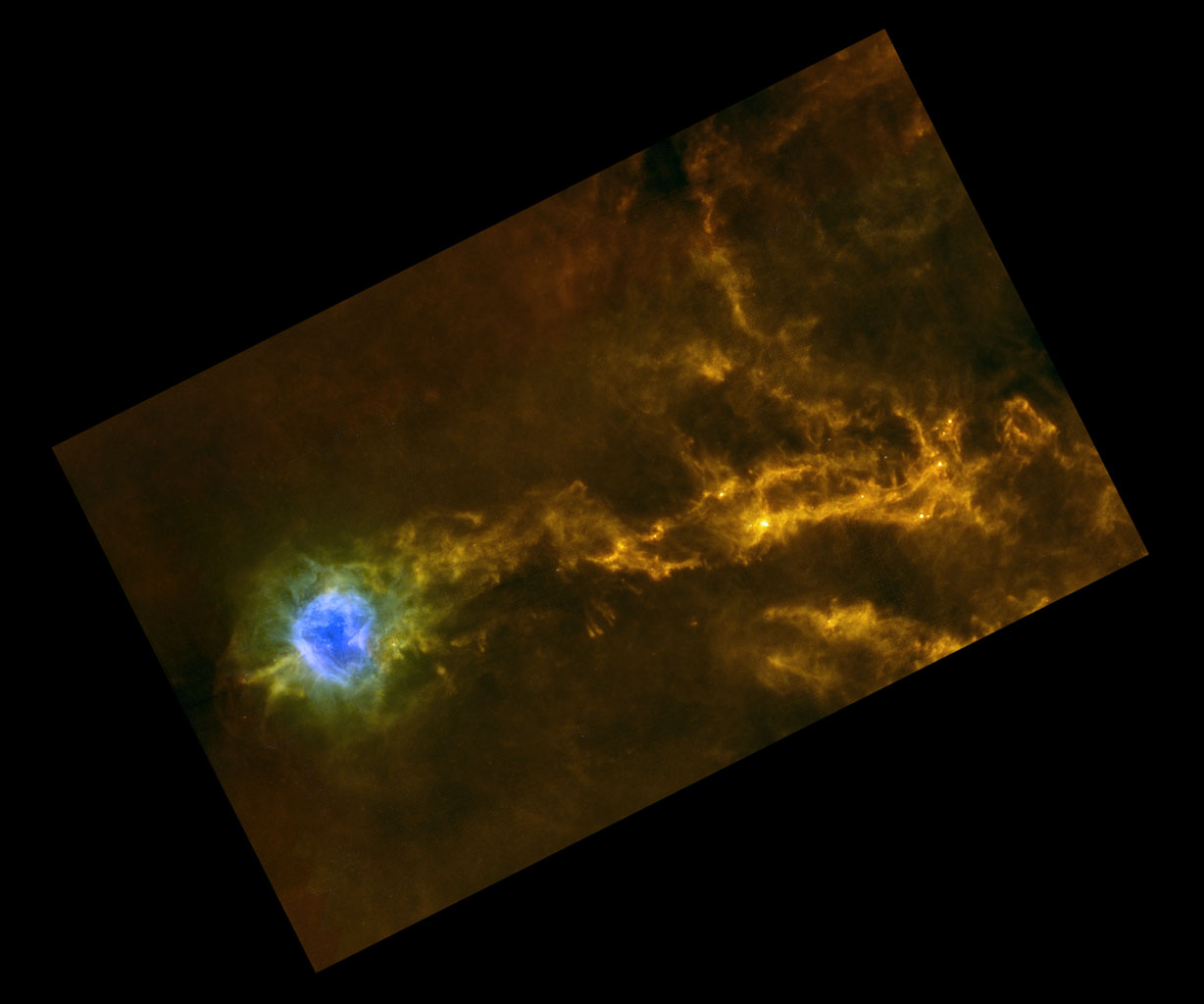
View of the IC 5146 star-forming region from ESA's Herschel Space Telescope

IC 5146 is a stellar nursery where star-formation is ongoing. Observations by both the Spitzer Space Telescope and the Chandra X-ray Observatory have collectively identified hundreds of young stellar objects. Young stars are seen in both the emission nebula, where gas has been ionized by massive young stars, and in the infrared-dark molecular cloud that forms the "tail". One of the most massive stars in the region is BD +46 3474, a star of class B1 that is an estimated 14±4 times the mass of the sun.

Another interesting star in the nebula is BD +46 3471, which is an example of a HAeBe star, an intermediate mass star with strong emission lines in its spectrum.

== See also ==
- Little Cocoon Nebula
