= Little Cocoon Nebula =

Little Cocoon Nebula may refer to:

- NGC 1624, in the constellation Perseus
- Sh 2-82, in the constellation Sagitta
