= Sh 2-82 =

Reflection nebula in the Sagitta constellation

Sharpless 2-82
Nebula
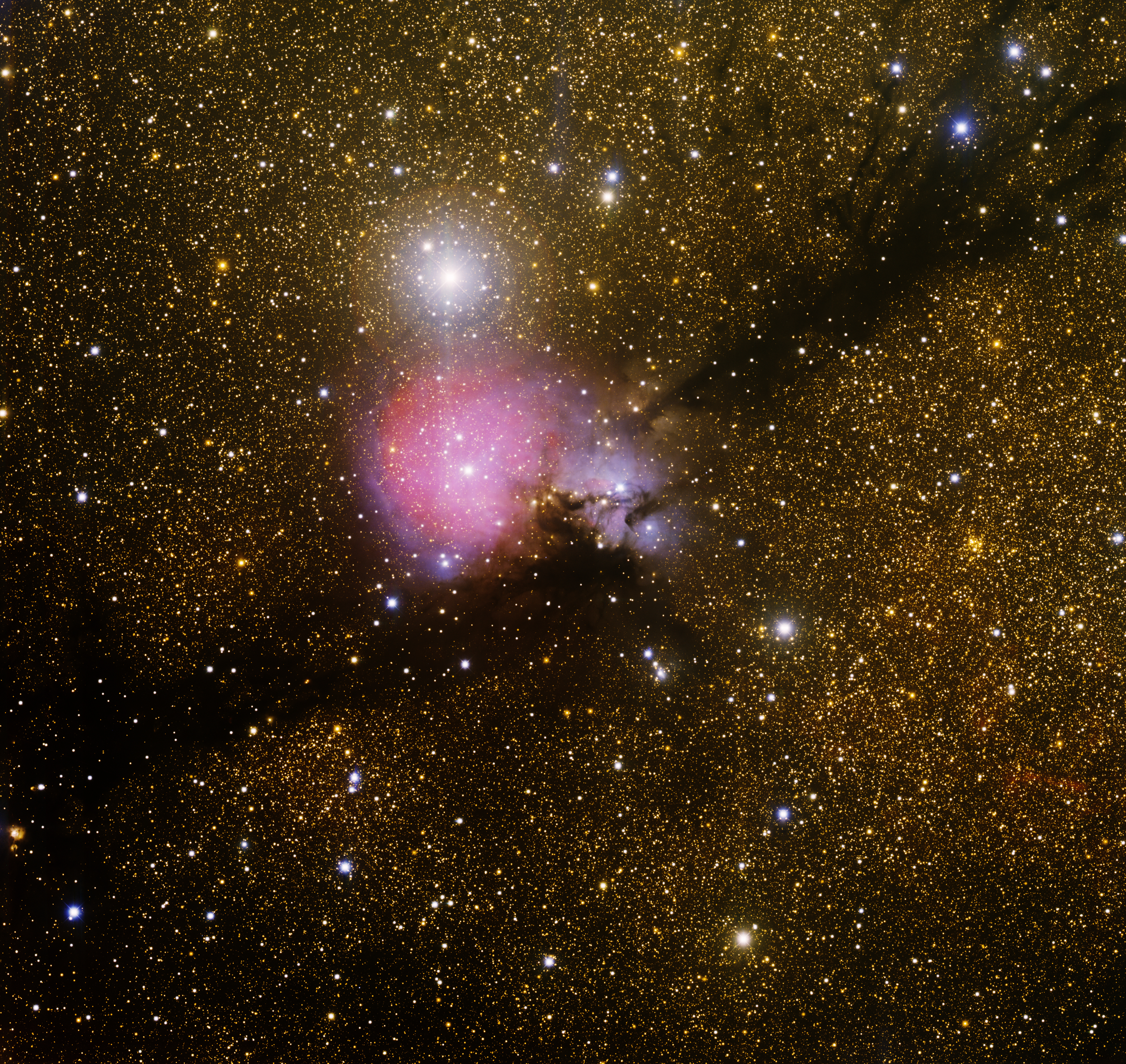
- Image of Sh 2-82 Nebula

Observation data: epoch
- Right ascension: 19^{h} 30^{m} 14.90^{s}
- Declination: +18° 17′ 30.0″
- Distance: 3,500 ly (1,100 pc)
- Constellation: Sagitta
- Designations: Sh 2-82, LBN 129, DG 159

Sh 2-82 (also known as the Little Cocoon Nebula or Little Trifid Nebula) is a small H II region and reflection nebula located in the constellation Sagitta. It is an active star-forming region embedded within a dark nebula, featuring a bright red emission component ionized by ultraviolet radiation from a hot young star, contrasted against a hazy blue reflection nebula created by scattered starlight. The nebula's compact, cocoon-like structure, with a flare on one side, makes it a popular target for amateur astronomers and astrophotographers. The nebula is ionized by the star HD 231616 (B0.5III).

== Observation and characteristics ==
The nebula has some informal nicknames, such as Little Cocoon Nebula, which derives from its enveloping reflection component resembling a protective shell around the central emission core, similar to the IC 5146 (Cocoon Nebula), while Little Trifid Nebula draws a comparison to the larger Trifid Nebula (M20) due to its tripartite appearance in deep-sky images, blending emission, reflection, and dark nebula.

Sharpless 2-82 is situated near the inner edge of the Vulpecula OB4 stellar association, a group of young, hot stars in the Milky Way's Sagittarius arm. It lies approximately 3,500 light-years from Earth. Astrophotography of Sharpless 2-82 often employs hydrogen-alpha and O-III narrowband imaging to highlight the ionized gas structures, revealing intricate dust lanes and embedded young stellar objects (YSOs).

The primary ionizing source is the blue giant star HD 231616 (B0.5III), part of the OB association Vul 0B4, and surrounding the emission nebula is a bluish reflection component, formed when light from nearby stars scatters off dust grains in the foreground dark cloud LDN 727. This creates a hazy halo that flares asymmetrically on one side, giving the cocoon appearance.

== See also ==
- NGC 1624, also known as the 'Little Cocoon Nebula'
- NGC 1579, known as the 'Northern Trifid Nebula'
- Cocoon Nebula
- Trifid Nebula
