= Messier 39 =

Open cluster in the constellation Cygnus

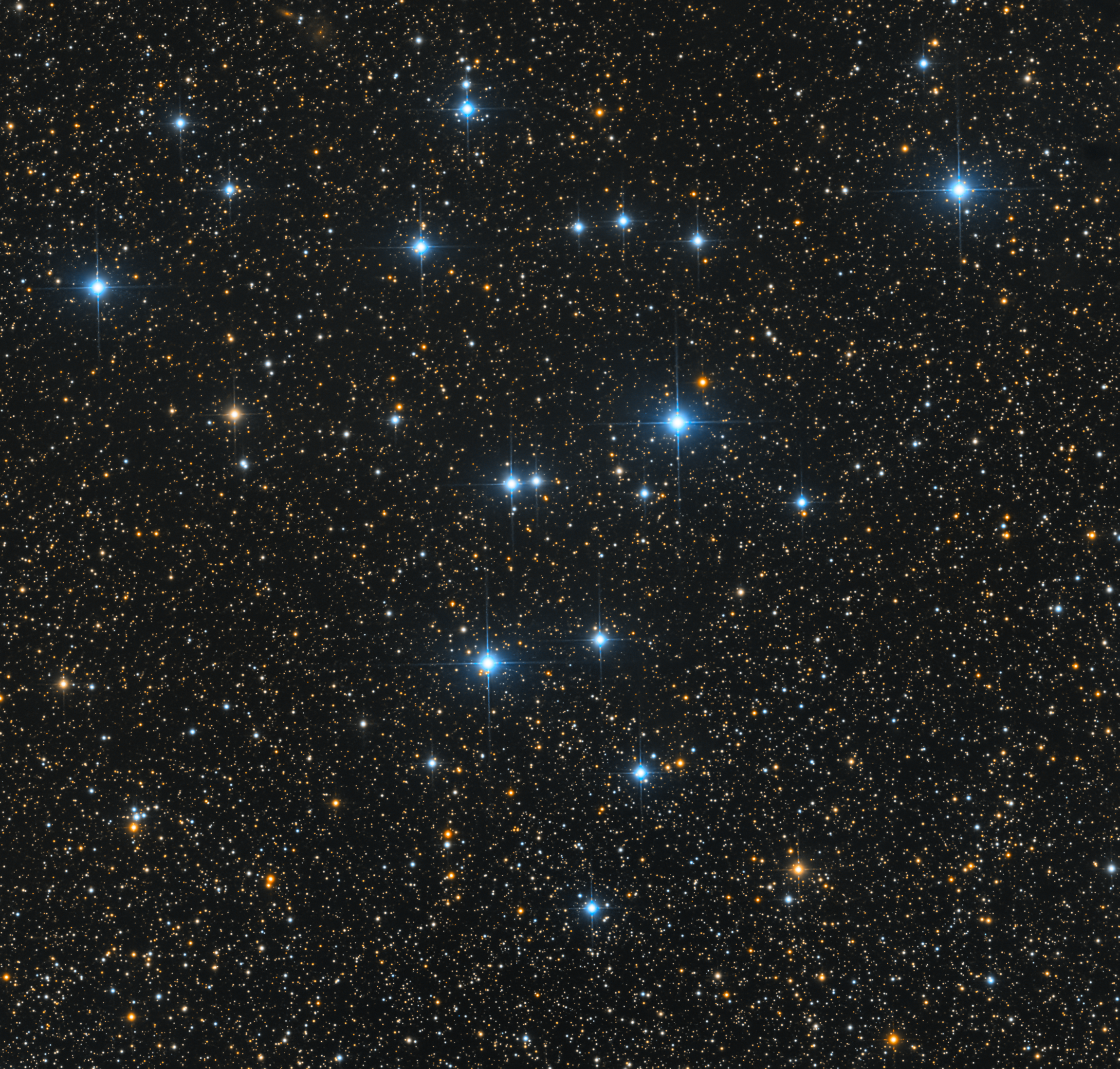
- Messier 39 contains bright, young B-type blue giant stars

Observation data (J2000 epoch)
- Right ascension: 21^{h} 31^{m} 48.0^{s}
- Declination: +48° 26′ 00″
- Distance: 1,010 ly (311 pc)
- Apparent magnitude (V): 4.6
- Apparent dimensions (V): 29′

Physical characteristics
- Mass: 232+210 −110 M_{☉}
- Estimated age: 278.6 Myr
- Other designations: M 39, NGC 7092, Cr 438

Associations
- Constellation: Cygnus

Messier 39 or M39, also known as NGC 7092, is an open cluster of stars in the constellation of Cygnus, sometimes referred to as the Pyramid Cluster. It is positioned two degrees south of the star Pi Cygni and around 9° east-northeast of Deneb. The cluster was discovered by Guillaume Le Gentil in 1749, then Charles Messier added it to his catalogue in 1764. When observed in a small telescope at low power the cluster shows around two dozen members but is best observed with binoculars. It has a total integrated magnitude (brightness) of 4.6 and spans an angular diameter of 29 arcminutes – about the size of the full Moon. It is centered about 1,010 light-years (311 parsecs) away.

This cluster has an estimated mass of 232 M_{☉} and a linear tidal radius of 8.6±1.8 pc. Of the 15 brightest components, six form binary star systems; one more is suspected. HD 205117 is a probable eclipsing binary system with a period of 113.2 days that varies by 0.051 in visual magnitude. Both members seem to be subgiants. Within are at least five chemically peculiar stars and ten suspected short-period variable stars.

== Map ==
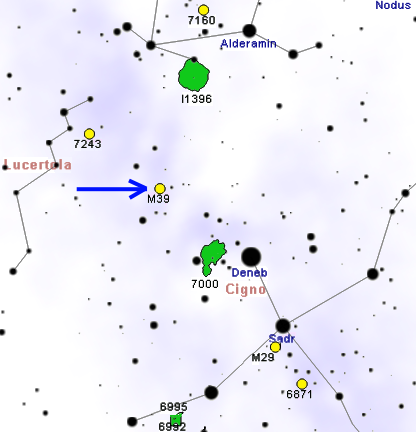
Map

== See also ==
- List of Messier objects
