= HD 142527 =

Young star in the constellation of Lupus

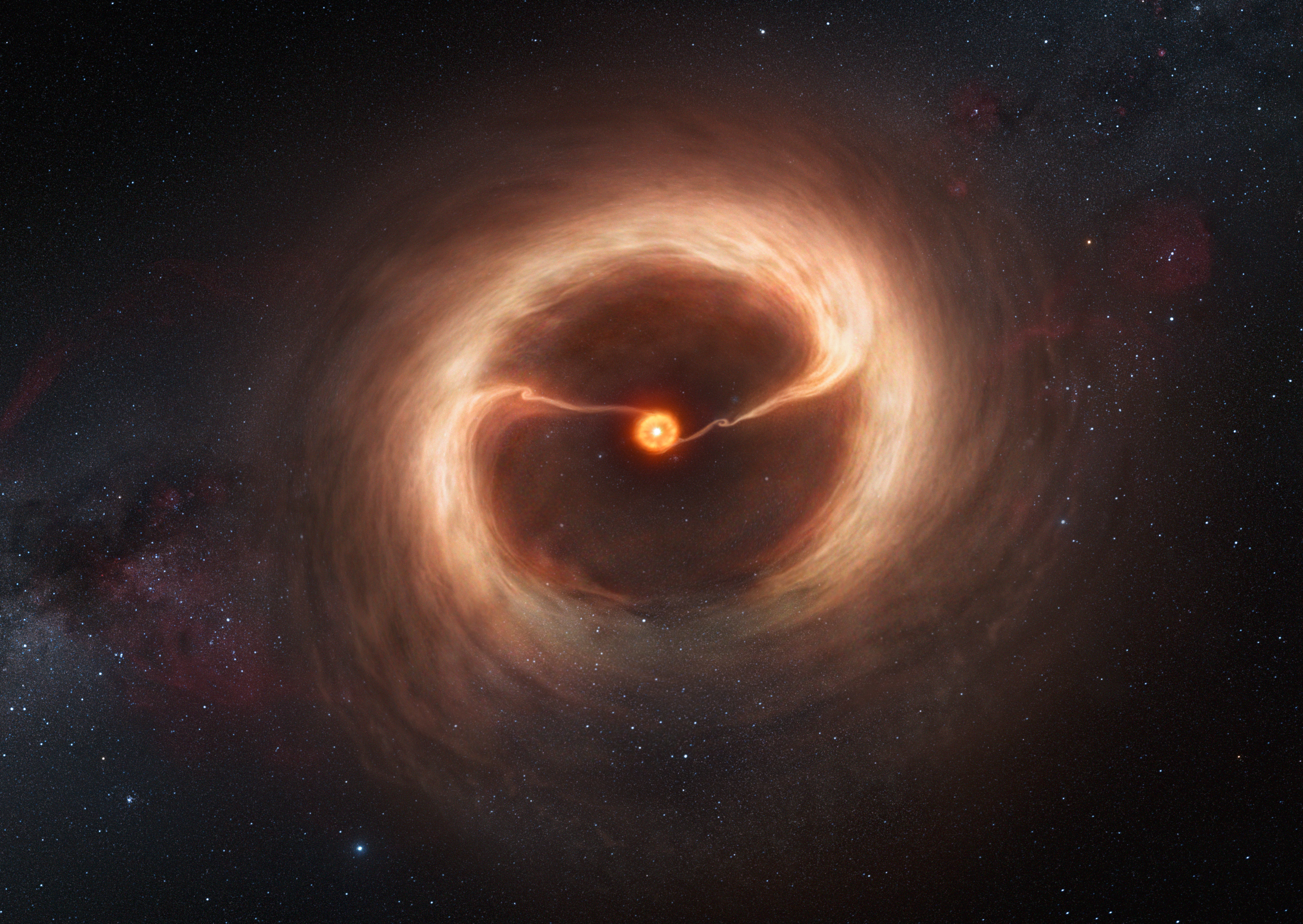
- Artist’s impression of the disc and gas streams around HD 142527

Observation data Epoch J2000 Equinox ICRS
- Constellation: Lupus
- Right ascension: 15^{h} 56^{m} 41.88986^{s}
- Declination: −42° 19′ 23.2746″
- Apparent magnitude (V): 8.34

Characteristics
- Spectral type: F6 III

Astrometry
Radial velocity (R_{v})	-3.10 km/s
Proper motion (μ)	RA: -11.19 mas/yr Dec.: -24.46 mas/yr
Parallax (π)	6.2791±0.0284 mas
Distance	519 ± 2 ly (159.3 ± 0.7 pc)

Orbit
Primary	HD 142527 A
Secondary	HD 142527 B
Period (P)	23.50±0.85 yr
Semi-major axis (a)	0.0678±0.014" (10.80±0.22 AU)
Eccentricity (e)	0.47±0.01
Inclination (i)	149.47±0.71°
Longitude of the node (Ω)	161.51±2.01°
Periastron epoch (T)	2020.42±0.05
Argument of periastron (ω) (secondary)	186.45±0.48°

Details

HD 142527 A
Mass	2.2±0.05 M_{☉}
Radius	3.46±0.13 R_{☉}
Luminosity	22.39±0.52 L_{☉}
Surface gravity (log g)	3.15 cgs
Temperature	6632 K
Metallicity [Fe/H]	0.33 dex
Age	4.4^{+0.49}_{−0.38} Myr

HD 142527 B
Mass	0.34±0.06 M_{☉}
Radius	1.37±0.05 R_{☉}
Luminosity	0.25±0.04 L_{☉}
Temperature	3500±100 K
Age	1.8^{+1.2}_{−-0.5} Myr

Other designations
- CD−41°10447, HD 142527, HIP 78092, SAO 226389, WDS J15567-4219AB, 2MASS J15564188-4219232, TYC 846-688-1, Gaia DR2 5994826707951507200

Database references
SIMBAD	data

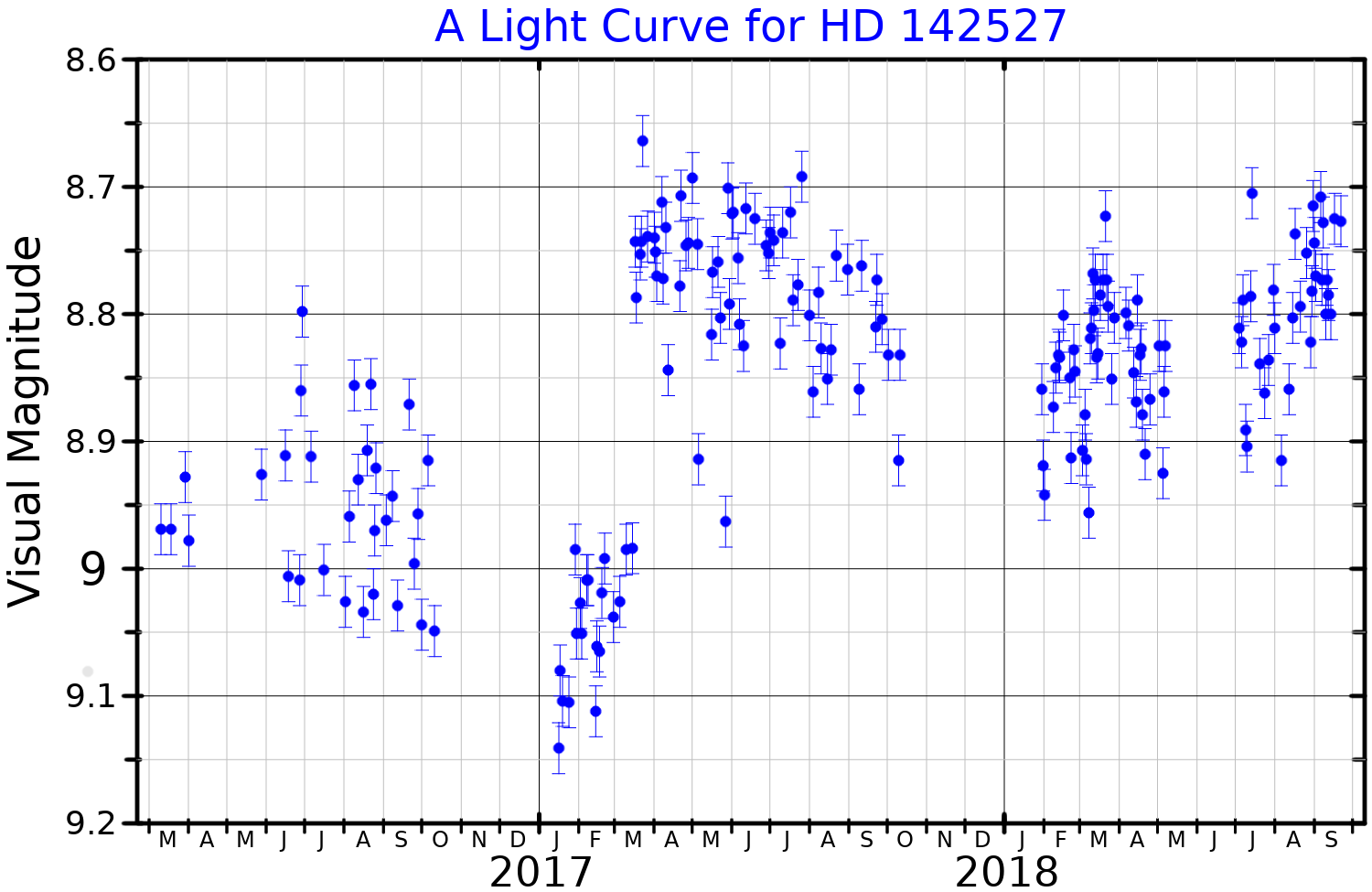
A visual band light curve for HD 142527, plotted from ASAS-SN data

HD 142527 is a binary star system in the constellation of Lupus. The primary star belongs to the Herbig Ae/Be star class, while the companion, discovered in 2012, is a red dwarf star or accreting protoplanet with a projected separation of less than 0.1″. The system is notable for its circumbinary protoplanetary disk and its discovery has helped refine models of planet formation. The orbit of companion is strongly inclined to the circumbinary protoplanetary disk. A possible second companion was discovered in 2026.

HD 142527 is listed in the International Variable star index as a UX Orionis variable, with a visible-light magnitude ranging from 8.27 to 8.60.

== Protoplanetary disk ==
HD 142527 is an extremely young star system, aged about 4.4 million years old so it retains its protoplanetary disk, which has a mass of 15 % of the Sun and a diameter of 980 AU.

Studies have shown eddies and vortex structures forming in the disk under the influence of two large planets. The system is important as it allows astronomers to observe the accretion process in planetary formation.

In early 2013 an article was published by astronomers working with the ALMA telescope in Chile, which refers to the discovery of two massive flows of matter in the system. Dust and gas is transferred from the periphery to the center through gravitational interaction with two giant planets that have a mass several times greater than the mass of Jupiter. Thus, the flows act as "pumps", pumping material from the edge of the center, "feeding" star. The planets themselves have not been detected so far, due to a dense shroud of gas. However, astronomers have proposed models that describe their existence.

Japanese astronomers have discovered particles of ice in the disk.

The planetary system
Companion (in order from star)	Mass	Semimajor axis (AU)	Orbital period (days)	Eccentricity	Inclination (°)	Radius
protoplanetary disk	140–550 AU				28°	—
