= Trifid Nebula =

Emission nebula in the constellation Sagittarius

Emission nebula
- H II region
- reflection nebula and dark nebula
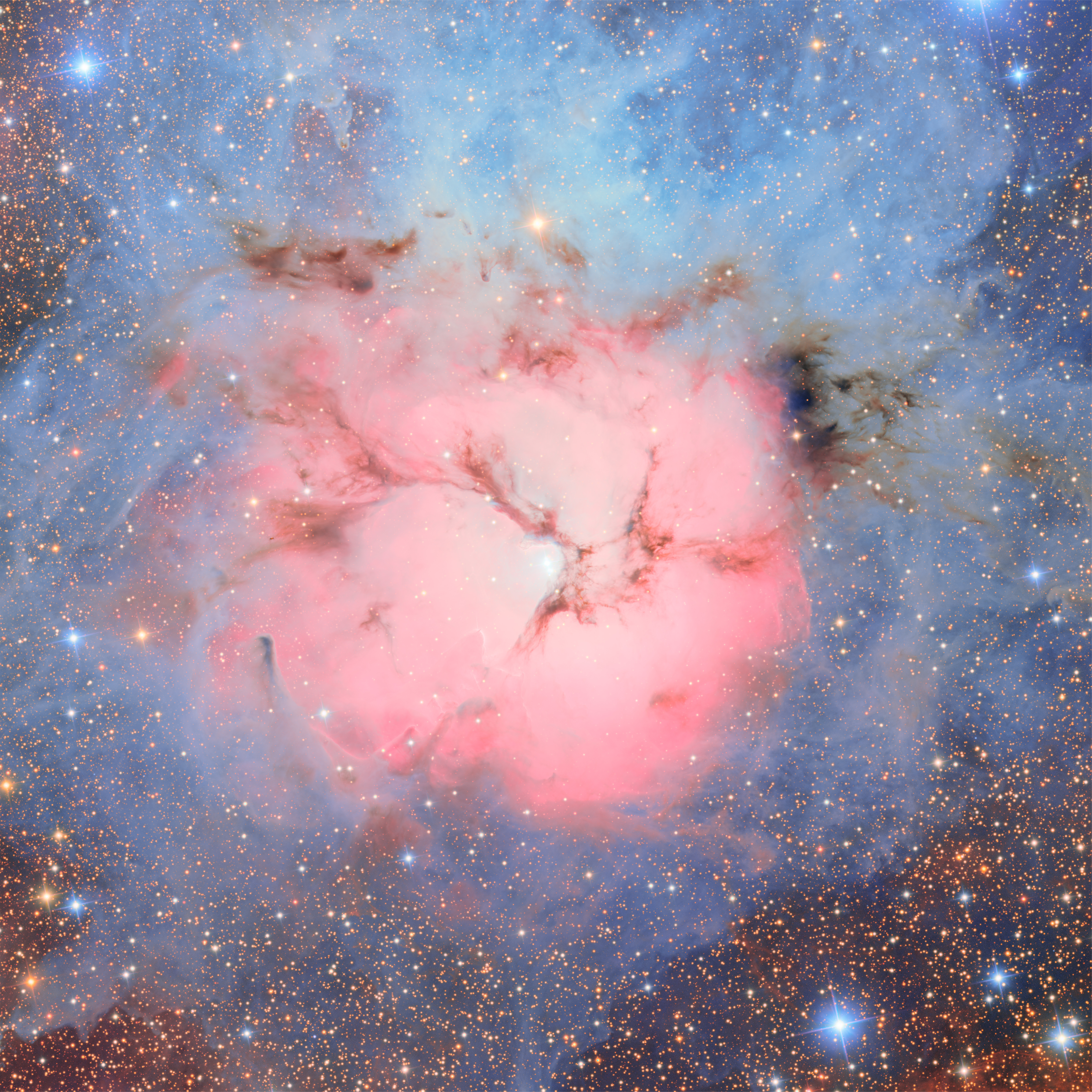
- The Trifid Nebula as imaged by the Vera C. Rubin Observatory in very high-resolution, taken on May 28, 2025

Observation data: J2000 epoch
- Right ascension: 18^{h} 02^{m} 23^{s}
- Declination: −23° 01′ 48″
- Distance: 4100±200 ly (1,260±70 pc)
- Apparent magnitude (V): +6.3
- Apparent dimensions (V): 28 arcmins
- Constellation: Sagittarius

Physical characteristics
- Radius: 21 ly
- Designations: M20, NGC 6514, Sharpless 30, RCW 147, Gum 76

The Trifid Nebula (catalogued as Messier 20 or M20 and as NGC 6514) is an H II region in the north-west of Sagittarius in a star-forming region in the Milky Way's Scutum–Centaurus Arm. It was discovered by Charles Messier on June 5, 1764. Its name means 'three-lobe'. The object is an unusual combination of an open cluster of stars, an emission nebula (the relatively dense, reddish-pink portion), a reflection nebula (the mainly NNE blue portion), and a dark nebula (the apparent 'gaps' in the former that cause the trifurcated appearance, also designated Barnard 85). Viewed through a small telescope, the Trifid Nebula is a bright and peculiar object, and is thus a perennial favorite of amateur astronomers.

The most massive star that has formed in this region is HD 164492A, an O7.5III star with a mass more than 20 times the mass of the Sun. This star is surrounded by a cluster of approximately 3100 young stars.

== Characteristics ==
The Trifid Nebula was the subject of an investigation by astronomers using the Hubble Space Telescope in 1997, using filters that isolate emission from hydrogen atoms, ionized sulfur atoms, and doubly ionized oxygen atoms. The images were combined into a false-color composite picture to suggest how the nebula might look to the eye.

The close-up images show a dense cloud of dust and gas, which is a stellar nursery full of embryonic stars. This cloud is about 8 ly away from the nebula's central star. A stellar jet protrudes from the head of the cloud and is about 0.75 ly long. The jet's source is a young stellar object deep within the cloud. Jets are the exhaust gasses of star formation and radiation from the nebula's central star makes the jet glow.

The images also showed a finger-like stalk to the right of the jet. It points from the head of the dense cloud directly toward the star that powers the Trifid Nebula. This stalk is a prominent example of evaporating gaseous globules, or 'EGGs'. The stalk has survived because its tip is a knot of gas that is dense enough to resist being eaten away by the powerful radiation from the star.

In January 2005, NASA's Spitzer Space Telescope discovered 30 embryonic stars and 120 newborn stars not seen in visible light images.

It is centered about 4100 ly from Earth. Its apparent magnitude is 6.3.

== Details and features ==
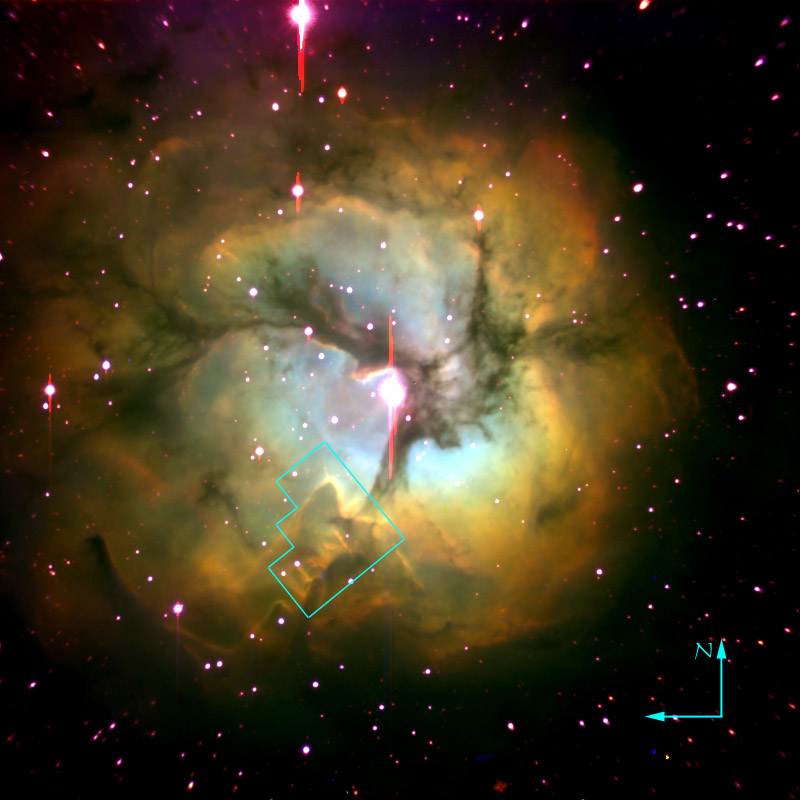
The Trifid Nebula. The outlined area is enlarged right.

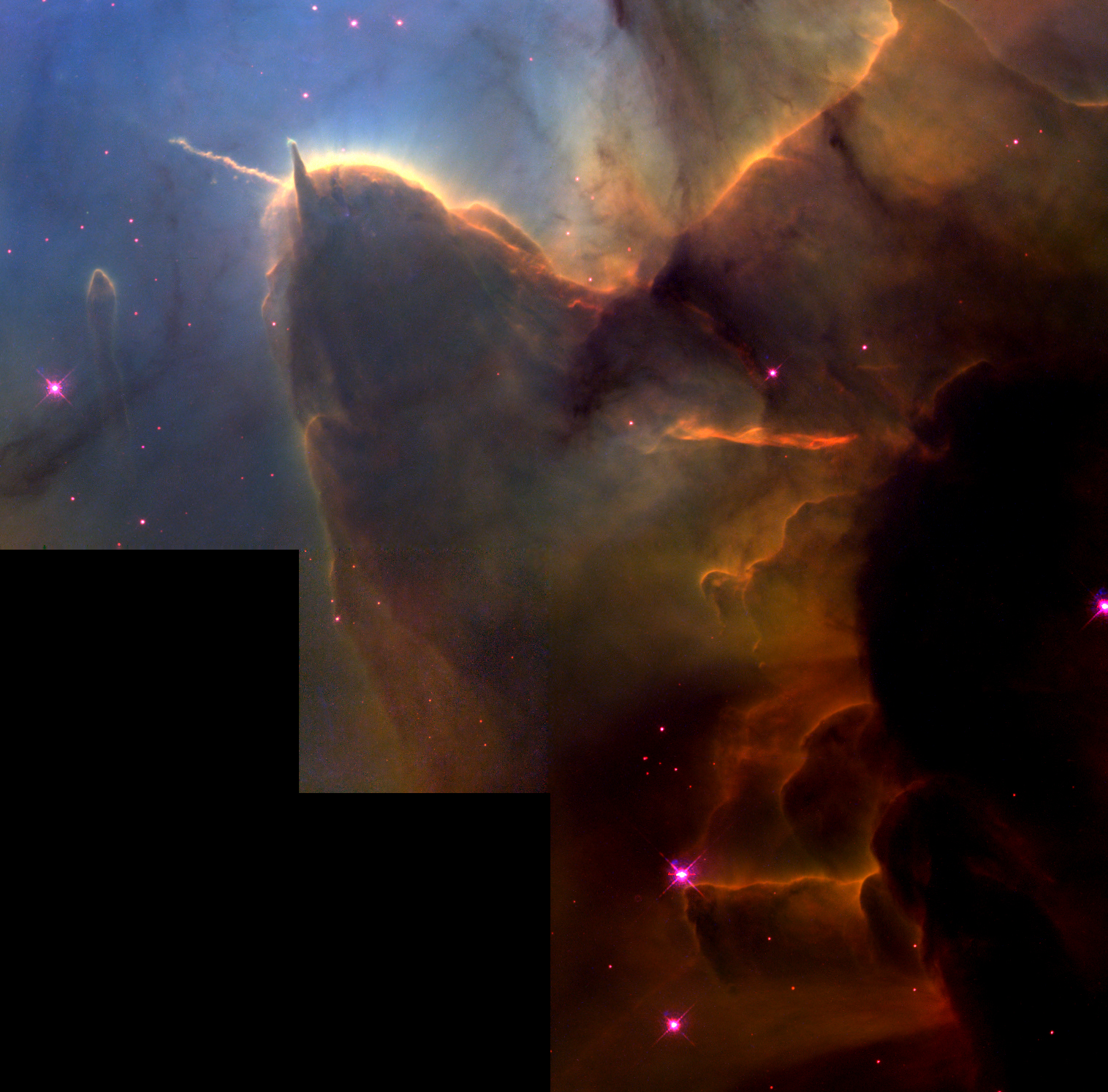
Hubble image of a stellar jet in the Trifid Nebula

This video sequence compares a new view of the Trifid Nebula in infrared light, from the VVV VISTA survey with a more familiar visible-light view from a small telescope.

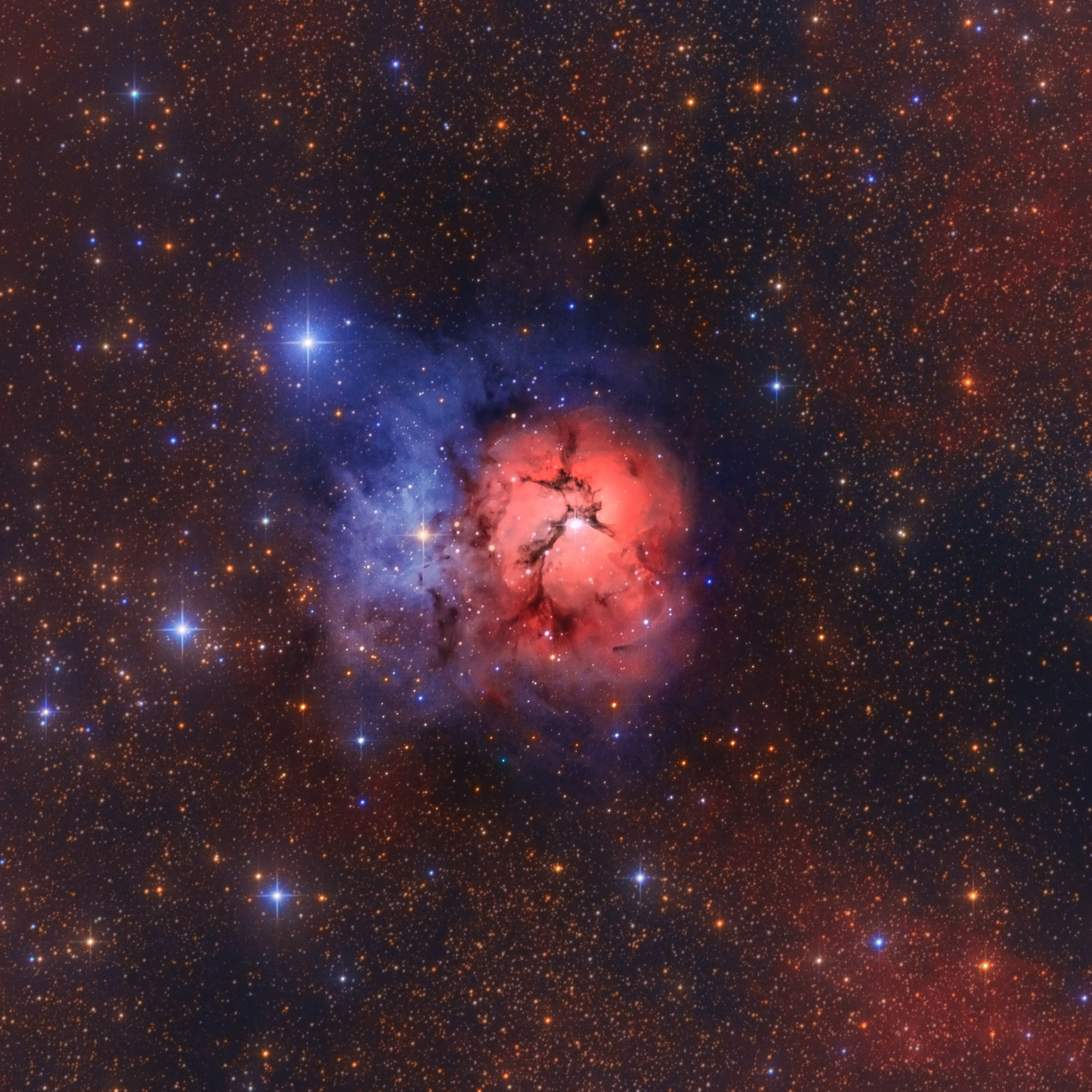
The Trifid Nebula

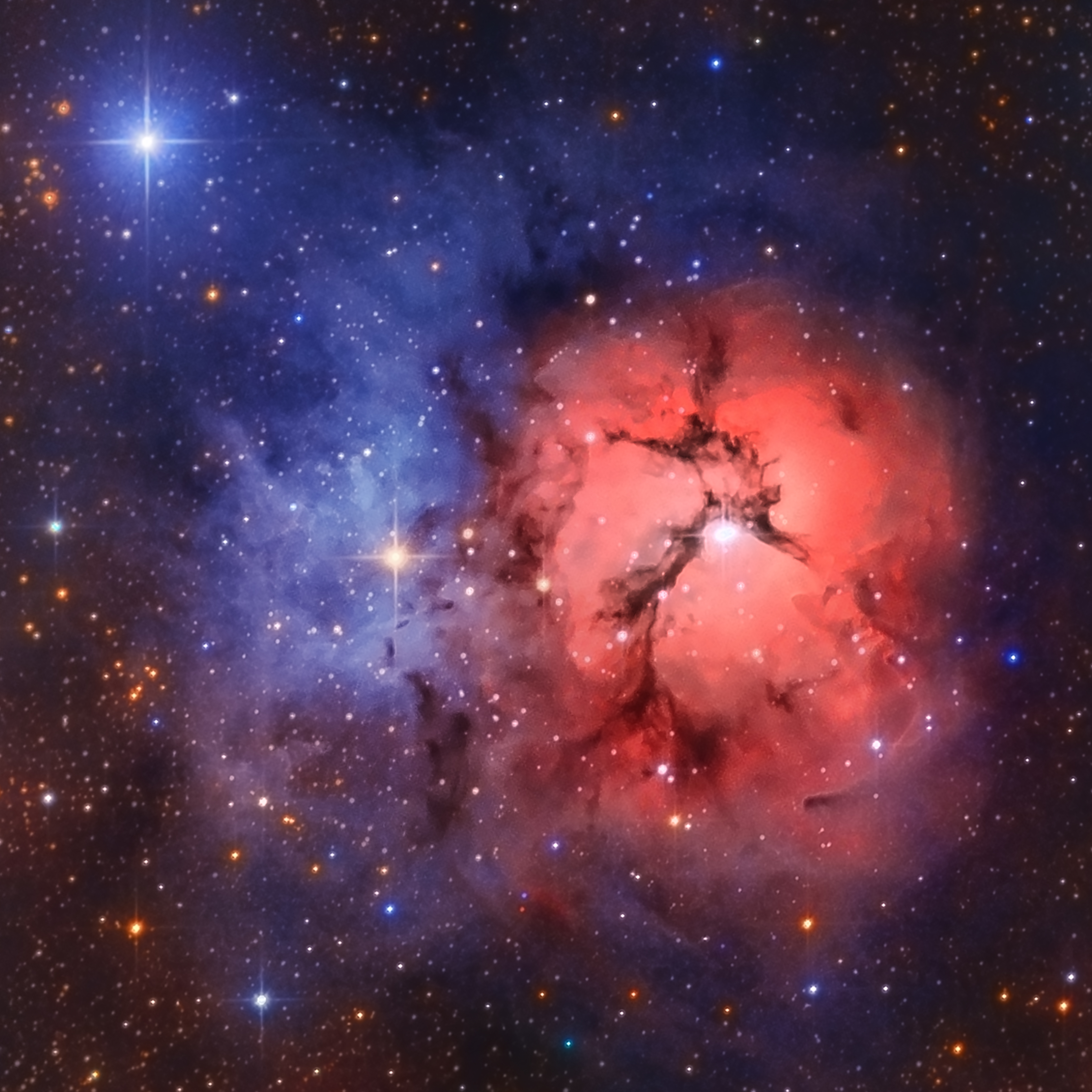
Trifid Nebula close-up

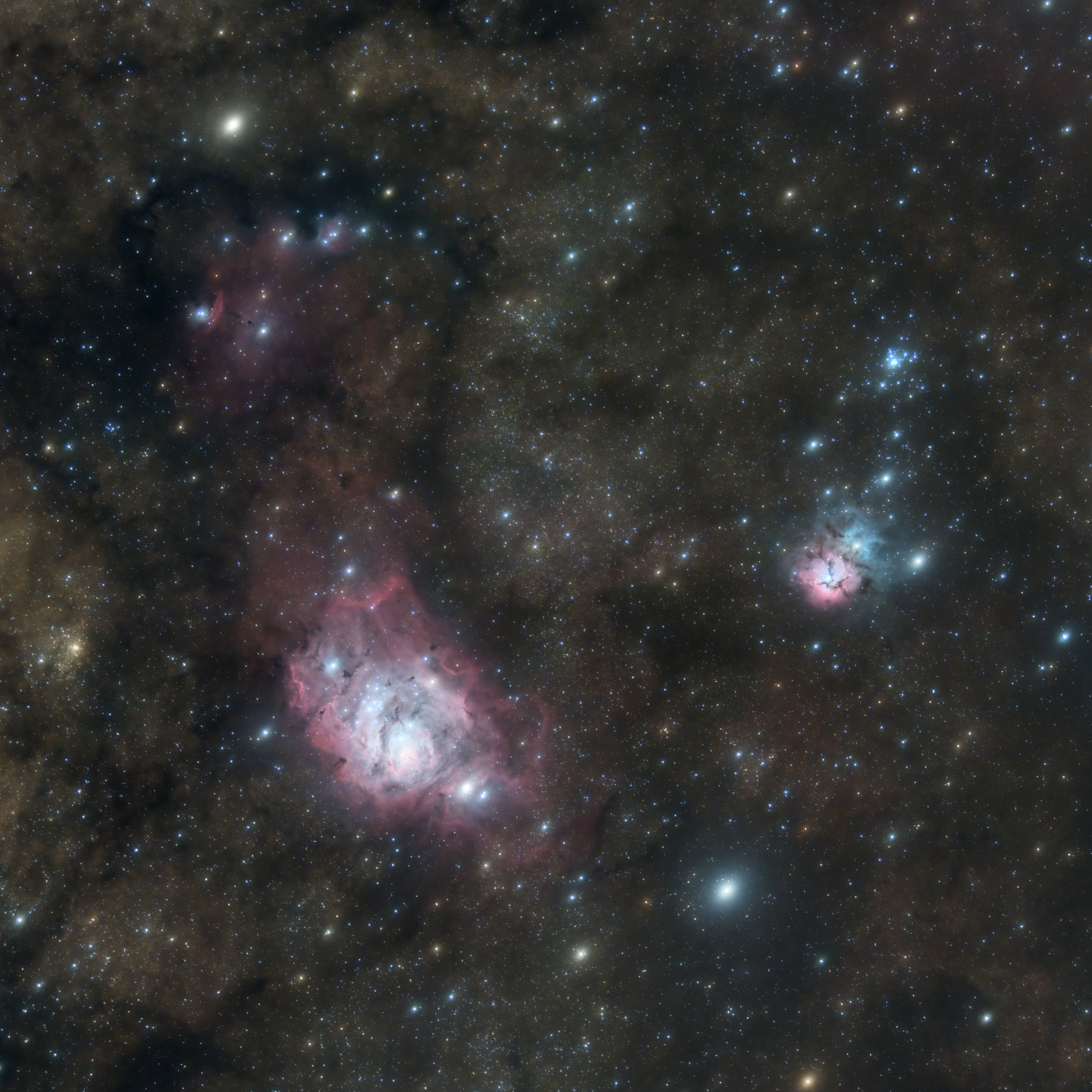
Widefield image of the Trifid Nebula next to Lagoon Nebula

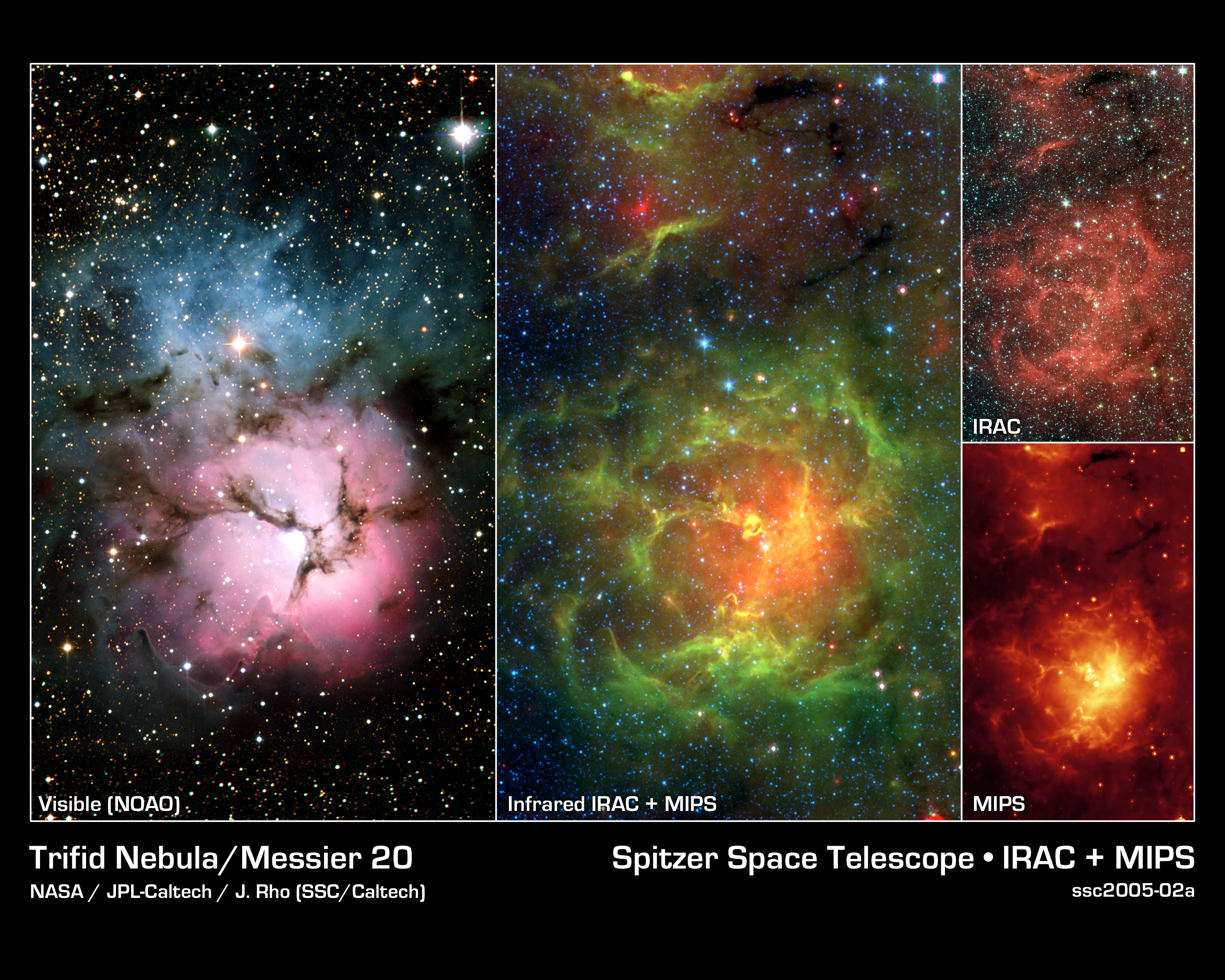
Trifid Nebula seen at different wavelengths

Close-up of the Trifid Nebula: "Cosmic Sea Slug" appears in Hubble’s 36th birthday image

== See also ==
- List of Messier objects
- List of nebulae
- Messier object
- New General Catalogue
- Islands (King Crimson album), which uses an image of the nebula as its cover
- Sh 2-82, also known as the 'Little Trifid Nebula'
- NGC 1579, also known as the 'Northern Trifid Nebula'
