= NGC 1579 =

Diffuse nebula in the constellation Perseus

Emission nebula
- H II region
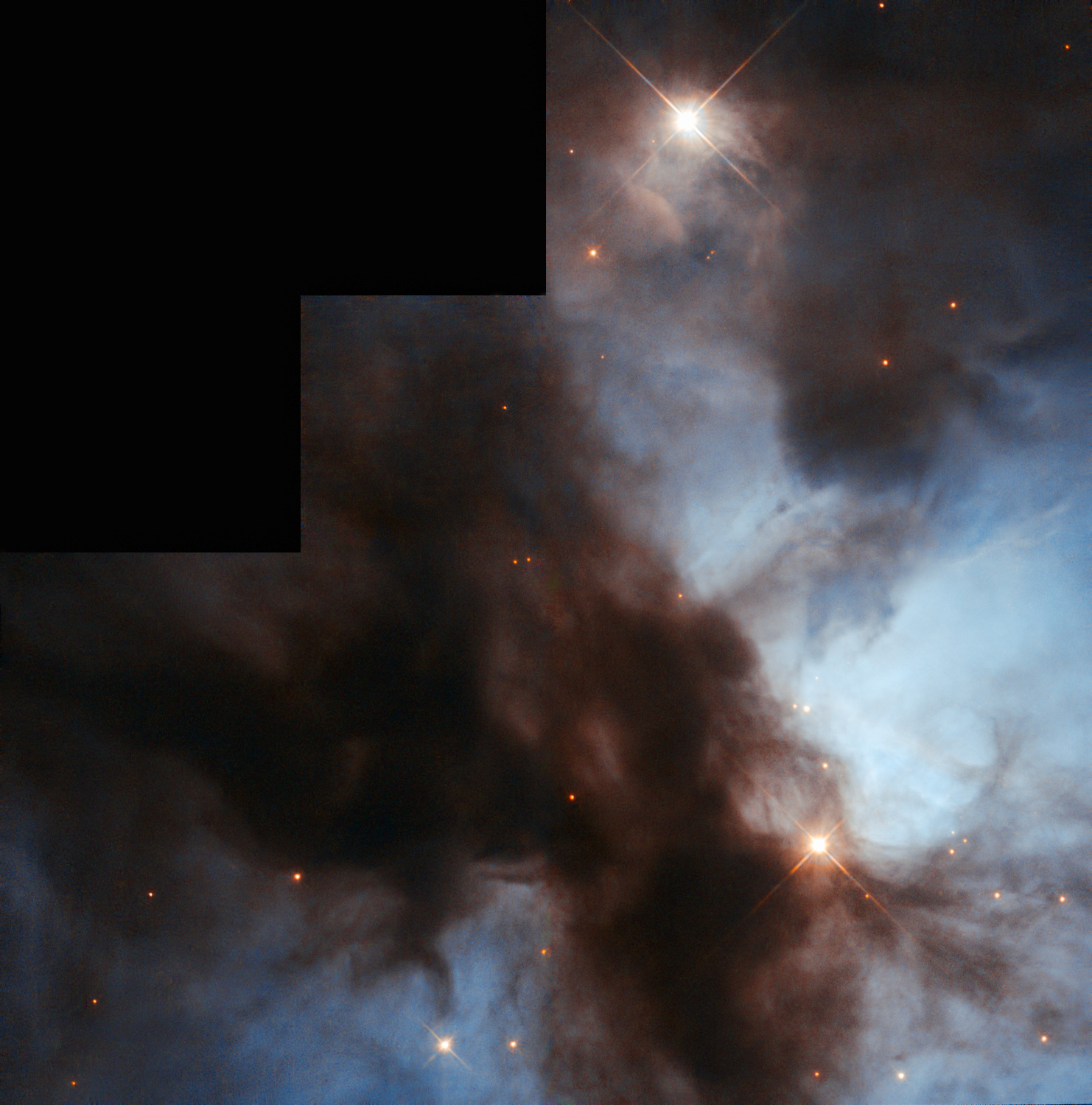
- NGC 1579 (Northern Trifid), as captured with the Hubble Space Telescope

Observation data: J2000 epoch
- Right ascension: 04^{h} 30^{m} 09.5^{s}
- Declination: +35° 16′ 19″
- Apparent dimensions (V): 12' × 8'
- Constellation: Perseus

Physical characteristics
- Radius: 4 ly
- Designations: LBN 767, [B77] 70, Ced 35, LBN 165.38-08.73, [SS62] 19, DG 34, SH 2-222, [TP72] 12.

NGC 1579 (also known as the Northern Trifid) is a diffuse nebula located in the constellation of Perseus. It is referred to as the Northern Trifid because of its similar appearance to the Trifid Nebula, which is located in the southern celestial hemisphere of the sky. It is a H II region, a region of star formation.

The star cluster contains the emission-line star LkHα 101, which provides much of the ionizing radiation in the nebula.

NGC 1579 lies within a giant molecular cloud known as the California Molecular Cloud.

== Gallery ==
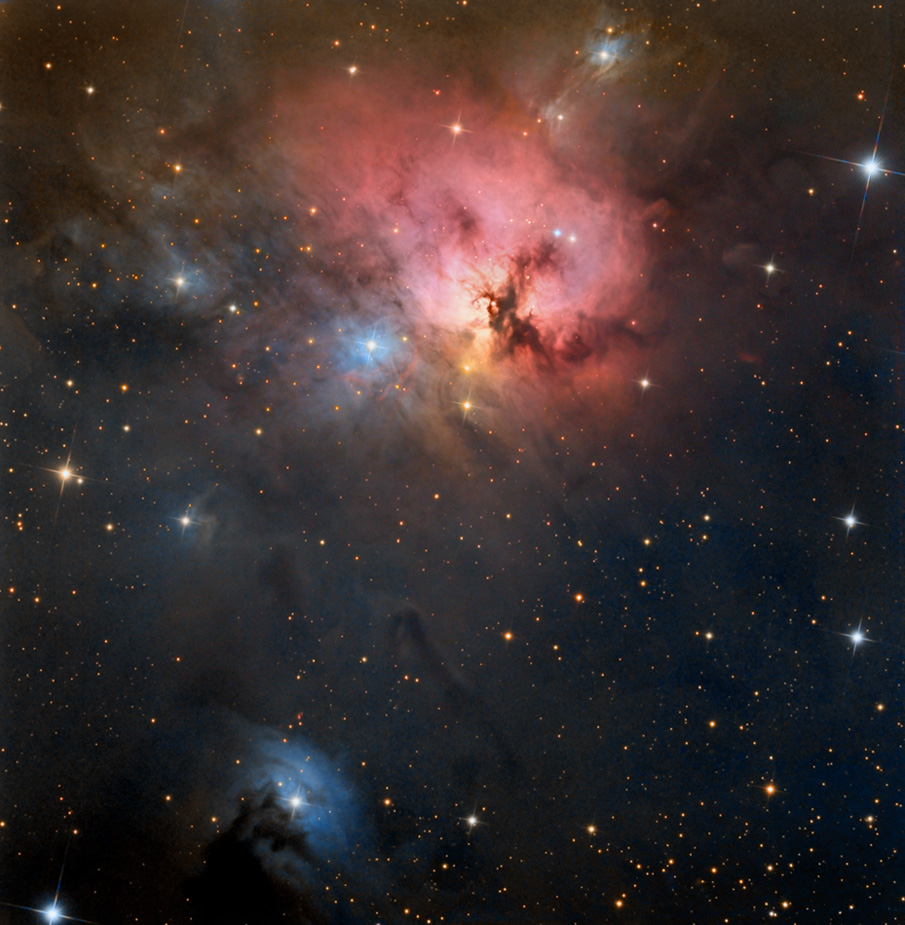
Wide field image of NGC 1579 from the 0.8m Schulman Telescope at the Mount Lemmon SkyCenter

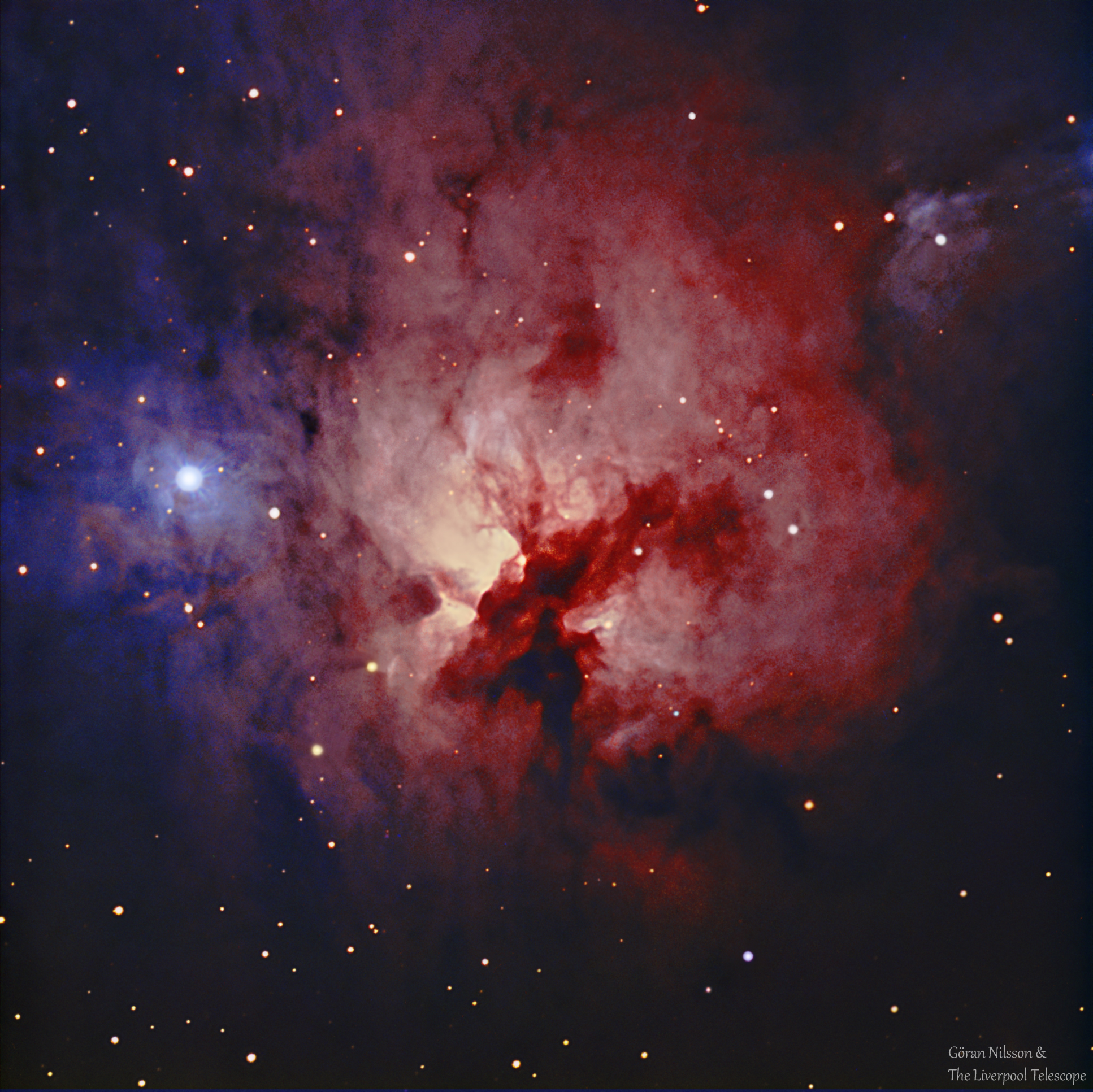
HaRGB image of the Northern Trifid Nebula NGC 1579 from the Liverpool Telescope on La Palma
