= Tidal downsizing =

Hypothetical mechanism of planet formation

Tidal downsizing is a hypothetical mechanism for the formation of planets. The process begins with the formation of large clumps of gas, of roughly 10 Jupiter masses, via gravitational instability in the outer parts of the protoplanetary disk. The clumps migrate inward due to gravitational interactions with the gas disk. Solid grains within the clump collide and grow and settle toward the center forming a massive core. The clump is disrupted due to tidal forces or heating from the star when it approaches within a few AU of the star leaving behind a smaller object. Depending on the extent and timing of the mass loss the remnant may be a terrestrial planet, an ice giant or a gas giant.
