= Pi Cygni =

The Bayer designation Pi Cygni (π Cyg / π Cygni) is shared by two stars, in the constellation Cygnus:

- π^{1} Cygni (Azelfafage)
- π^{2} Cygni

All of them were member of asterism 騰蛇 (Téng Shé), Flying Serpent, Encampment mansion.
