= List of gravitationally rounded objects of the Solar System =

This is a list of most likely gravitationally rounded objects (GRO) of the Solar System, which are objects that have a rounded, ellipsoidal shape due to their own gravity (but are not necessarily in hydrostatic equilibrium). Apart from the Sun itself, these objects qualify as planets according to common geophysical definitions of that term. The radii of these objects range over three orders of magnitude, from planetary-mass objects like dwarf planets and some moons to the planets and the Sun. This list does not include small Solar System bodies, but it does include a sample of possible planetary-mass objects whose shapes have yet to be determined. The Sun's orbital characteristics are listed in relation to the Galactic Center, while all other objects are listed in order of their distance from the Sun.

== Star ==
The Sun is a G-type main-sequence star. It contains almost 99.9% of all the mass in the Solar System.

		Sun
Symbol (image)^{[q]}		
Symbol (Unicode)^{[q]}		☉
Discovery year		Prehistoric
Mean distance from the Galactic Center	km light years	≈ 2.5×10^{17} ≈ 26,000
Mean radius	km :E^{[f]}	695,508; 109.3
Surface area	km^{2} :E^{[f]}	6.0877×10^{12} 11,990
Volume	km^{3} :E^{[f]}	1.4122×10^{18} 1,300,000
Mass	kg :E^{[f]}	1.9855×10^{30} 332,978.9
Gravitational parameter	m^{3/}s^{2}	1.327×10^{20}
Density	g/cm^{3}	1.409
Equatorial gravity	m/s^{2} g	274.0; 27.94
Escape velocity	km/s	617.7
Rotation period	days^{[g]}	25.38
Orbital period about Galactic Center	million years	225–250
Mean orbital speed	km/s	≈ 220
Axial tilt^{[i]} to the ecliptic	deg.	7.25
Axial tilt^{[i]} to the galactic plane	deg.	67.23
Mean surface temperature	K	5,778
Mean coronal temperature	K	1–2×10^{6}
Photospheric composition		H, He, O, C, Fe, S

== Planets ==
In 2006, the International Astronomical Union (IAU) defined a planet as a body in orbit around the Sun that was large enough to have achieved hydrostatic equilibrium and to have "cleared the neighbourhood around its orbit". The practical meaning of "cleared the neighborhood" is that a planet is comparatively massive enough for its gravitation to control the orbits of all objects in its vicinity. In practice, the term "hydrostatic equilibrium" is interpreted more loosely as a requirement for rounding by gravity. Mercury is round but not actually in hydrostatic equilibrium; it is universally regarded as a planet nonetheless.

According to the IAU's explicit count, there are eight planets in the Solar System; four terrestrial planets (Mercury, Venus, Earth, and Mars) and four giant planets, which can be divided further into two gas giants (Jupiter and Saturn) and two ice giants (Uranus and Neptune). When excluding the Sun, the four giant planets account for more than 99% of the mass of the Solar System.

Key
* Terrestrial planet
° Gas giant
^{×} Ice giant

		*Mercury	*Venus	*Earth	*Mars	°Jupiter	°Saturn	^{×}Uranus	^{×}Neptune
Symbol^{[q]}								or	
Symbol (Unicode)^{[q]}		☿	♀	🜨	♂	♃	♄	⛢ or ♅	♆
Discovery year		Prehistoric	Prehistoric	Prehistoric	Prehistoric	Prehistoric	Prehistoric	1781	1846
Mean distance from the Sun	km AU	57,909,175; 0.38709893	108,208,930; 0.72333199	149,597,890; 1.00000011	227,936,640; 1.52366231	778,412,010; 5.20336301	1,426,725,400; 9.53707032	2,870,972,200; 19.19126393	4,498,252,900; 30.06896348
Equatorial radius	km :E^{[f]}	2,440.53; 0.3826	6,051.8; 0.9488	6,378.1366; 1	3,396.19; 0.53247	71,492; 11.209	60,268; 9.449	25,559; 4.007	24,764; 3.883
Surface area	km^{2} :E^{[f]}	75,000,000; 0.1471	460,000,000; 0.9020	510,000,000; 1	140,000,000; 0.2745	64,000,000,000; 125.5	44,000,000,000; 86.27	8,100,000,000; 15.88	7,700,000,000; 15.10
Volume	km^{3} :E^{[f]}	6.083×10^{10} 0.056	9.28×10^{11} 0.857	1.083×10^{12} 1	1.6318×10^{11} 0.151	1.431×10^{15} 1,321.3	8.27×10^{14} 763.62	6.834×10^{13} 63.102	6.254×10^{13} 57.747
Mass	kg :E^{[f]}	3.302×10^{23} 0.055	4.8690×10^{24} 0.815	5.972×10^{24} 1	6.4191×10^{23} 0.107	1.8987×10^{27} 318	5.6851×10^{26} 95	8.6849×10^{25} 14.5	1.0244×10^{26} 17
Gravitational parameter	m^{3}/s^{2}	2.203×10^{13}	3.249×10^{14}	3.986×10^{14}	4.283×10^{13}	1.267×10^{17}	3.793×10^{16}	5.794×10^{15}	6.837×10^{15}
Density	g/cm^{3}	5.43	5.24	5.52	3.940	1.33	0.70	1.30	1.76
Equatorial gravity	m/s^{2} g	3.70; 0.377	8.87; 0.904	9.8; 1.00	3.71; 0.378	24.79; 2.528	10.44; 1.065	8.87; 0.904	11.15; 1.137
Escape velocity	km/s	4.25	10.36	11.18	5.02	59.54	35.49	21.29	23.71
Rotation period^{[g]}	days	58.646225	243.0187	0.99726968	1.02595675	0.41354	0.44401	0.71833	0.67125
Orbital period^{[g]}	days years	87.969; 0.2408467	224.701; 0.61519726	365.256363; 1.0000174	686.971; 1.8808476	4,332.59; 11.862615	10,759.22; 29.447498	30,688.5; 84.016846	60,182; 164.79132
Mean orbital speed^{[o]}	km/s	47.8725	35.0214	29.7859	24.1309	13.0697	9.6724	6.8352	5.4778
Eccentricity		0.20563069	0.00677323	0.01671022	0.09341233	0.04839266	0.05415060	0.04716771	0.00858587
Inclination^{[f]}	deg.	7.00	3.39	0	1.85	1.31	2.48	0.76	1.77
Axial tilt^{[i]}	deg.	0.0	177.3^{[h]}	23.44	25.19	3.12	26.73	97.86^{[h]}	28.32
Mean surface temperature	K	440–100	730	287	227	152 ^{[j]}	134 ^{[j]}	76 ^{[j]}	73 ^{[j]}
Mean air temperature^{[k]}	K			288		165	135	76	73
Atmospheric composition		He, Na^{+} K^{+}	CO_{2}, N_{2}, SO_{2}	N_{2}, O_{2}, Ar, CO_{2}	CO_{2}, N_{2} Ar	H_{2}, He	H_{2}, He	H_{2}, He; CH_{4}	H_{2}, He; CH_{4}
Number of known moons^{[v]}		0	0	1	2	115	293	29	16
Rings?		No	No	No	No	Yes	Yes	Yes	Yes
Planetary discriminant^{[l]}^{[o]}		9.1×10^{4}	1.35×10^{6}	1.7×10^{6}	1.8×10^{5}	6.25×10^{5}	1.9×10^{5}	2.9×10^{4}	2.4×10^{4}
Apsidal precession timeperiod	asec per yr years	5.75 225,391	2.04 635,294	11.45 113,188	16.28 79,607	6.55 197,862	19.50 66,461	3.34 388,024	0.36 3,600,000
Axial precession timeperiod	years	550	29,000	25,600	173,000	473,500	1,800,000	0.72	1,870,000

== Dwarf planets ==
Dwarf planets are bodies orbiting the Sun that are massive and warm enough to have achieved hydrostatic equilibrium, but have not cleared their neighbourhoods of similar objects. Since 2008, there have been five dwarf planets recognized by the IAU, although only Pluto has actually been confirmed to be in hydrostatic equilibrium (Ceres is close to equilibrium, though some anomalies remain unexplained). Ceres orbits in the asteroid belt, between Mars and Jupiter. The others all orbit beyond Neptune.

Key
^{†} Asteroid belt
^{‡} Kuiper belt
^{§} Scattered disc
^{×} Sednoid

		^{†}Ceres	^{‡}Pluto	^{‡}Haumea	^{‡}Makemake	^{§}Eris
Symbol^{[q]}			or			
Symbol (Unicode)^{[q]}		⚳	♇ or ⯓	🝻	🝼	⯰
Minor planet number		1	134340	136108	136472	136199
Discovery year		1801	1930	2004	2005	2005
Mean distance from the Sun	km AU	413,700,000; 2.766	5,906,380,000; 39.482	6,484,000,000; 43.335	6,850,000,000; 45.792	10,210,000,000; 67.668
Mean radius	km :E^{[f]}	469.7±0.02; 0.0737	1,188.3; 0.186	772 (1061 × 844 × 518); 0.12	715; 0.11	1,163; 0.18
Volume	km^{3} :E^{[f]}	4.21×10^{8} 0.00039^{[b]}	6.99×10^{9} 0.0065	1.98×10^{9} 0.0018	1.7×10^{9} 0.0016^{[b]}	6.59×10^{9} 0.0061^{[b]}
Surface area	km^{2} :E^{[f]}	2,770,000; 0.0054^{[a]}	17,700,000; 0.035	8,140,000; 0.016^{[y]}	6,900,000; 0.0135^{[a]}	17,000,000; 0.0333^{[a]}
Mass	kg :E^{[f]}	9.38392±0.00005×10^{20} ≈ 0.0002	1.3025±0.0006×10^{22} 0.0022	3.95244+0.01109 −0.01103×10^{21} 0.0007	≈ 3.1×10^{21} 0.0005	1.65×10^{22} 0.0028
Gravitational parameter	m^{3/}s^{2}	6.263 × 10^{10}	8.710 × 10^{11}	2.674 × 10^{11}	2.069 × 10^{11}	1.108 × 10^{12}
Density	g/cm^{3}	2.1616±0.0025	1.853±0.004	2.052+0.157 −0.152	2.03	2.43
Equatorial gravity	m/s^{2} g	0.27^{[d]} 0.028	0.62; 0.063	0.63^{[d]} 0.064	0.40; 0.041	0.82^{[d]} 0.084
Escape velocity	km/s^{[e]}	0.51	1.21	0.91	0.54	1.37
Rotation period^{[g]}	days	0.3781	6.3872	0.1631	0.9511	15.7859
Orbital period^{[g]}	years	4.599	247.9	283.8	306.2	559
Mean orbital speed^{[o]}	km/s	17.882	4.75	4.48^{[o]}	4.40^{[o]}	3.44^{[n]}
Eccentricity		0.080	0.249	0.195	0.161	0.436
Inclination^{[f]}	deg.	10.59	17.14	28.21	28.98	44.04
Axial tilt^{[i]}	deg.	4	119.6^{[h]}	≈ 126^{[h]}	?	≈ 78
Mean surface temperature^{[w]}	K	167	40	<50	30	30
Atmospheric composition		H_{2}O	N_{2}, CH_{4,} CO	?	N_{2}, CH_{4}	N_{2}, CH_{4}
Number of known moons^{[v]}		0	5	2	1	1
Rings?		No	No	Yes	?	?
Planetary discriminant^{[l]}^{[o]}		0.33	0.077	0.023	0.02	0.10

Astronomers usually refer to solid bodies such as Ceres as dwarf planets, even if they are not strictly in hydrostatic equilibrium. They generally agree that several other trans-Neptunian objects (TNOs) may be large enough to be dwarf planets, given current uncertainties. However, there has been disagreement on the required size. Early speculations were based on the small moons of the giant planets, which attain roundness around a threshold of 200 km radius. However, these moons are at higher temperatures than TNOs and are icier than TNOs are likely to be. Estimates from an IAU question-and-answer press release from 2006, giving 800 km radius and 0.5×10^{21} kg mass as cut-offs that normally would be enough for hydrostatic equilibrium, while stating that observation would be needed to determine the status of borderline cases. Many TNOs in the 200–500 km radius range are dark and low-density bodies, which suggests that they retain internal porosity from their formation, and hence are not planetary bodies (as planetary bodies have sufficient gravitation to collapse out such porosity).

In 2023, Emery et al. wrote that near-infrared spectroscopy by the James Webb Space Telescope (JWST) in 2022 suggests that Sedna, Gonggong, and Quaoar underwent internal melting, differentiation, and chemical evolution, like the larger dwarf planets Pluto, Eris, Haumea, and Makemake, but unlike "all smaller KBOs". This is because light hydrocarbons are present on their surfaces (e.g. ethane, acetylene, and ethylene), which implies that methane is continuously being resupplied, and that methane would likely come from internal geochemistry. On the other hand, the surfaces of Sedna, Gonggong, and Quaoar have low abundances of CO and CO_{2}, similar to Pluto, Eris, and Makemake, but in contrast to smaller bodies. This suggests that the threshold for dwarf planethood in the trans-Neptunian region is around 500 km radius.

In 2024, Kiss et al. found that Quaoar has an ellipsoidal shape incompatible with hydrostatic equilibrium for its current spin. They hypothesised that Quaoar originally had a rapid rotation and was in hydrostatic equilibrium, but that its shape became "frozen in" and did not change as it spun down due to tidal forces from its moon Weywot. If so, this would resemble the situation of Saturn's moon Iapetus, which is too oblate for its current spin. Iapetus is generally still considered a planetary-mass moon nonetheless, though not always.

The table below gives Orcus, Quaoar, Gonggong, and Sedna as additional consensus dwarf planets. Slightly smaller Salacia, which is larger than 400 km radius is not often given as a confident dwarf planet candidate, therefore has not been included.

		^{‡}Orcus	^{‡}Quaoar	^{§}Gonggong	^{×}Sedna
Symbol^{[q]}					
Symbol (Unicode)^{[q]}		🝿	🝾	🝽	⯲
Minor-planet number		90482	50000	225088	90377
Discovery year		2004	2002	2007	2003
Mean distance from the Sun	km AU	5,896,946,000; 39.419	6,535,930,000; 43.69	10,072,433,340; 67.33	78,668,000,000; 525.86
Mean radius^{[s]}	km :E^{[f]}	458.5; 0.0720	548.8±1.1; 0.0871	615; 0.0982	497.5; 0.0780
Surface area^{[a]}	km^{2} :E^{[f]}	2,641,700; 0.005179	3,870,800; 0.007589	4,932,300; 0.009671	3,110,200; 0.006098
Volume^{[b]}	km^{3} :E^{[f]}	403,744,500; 0.000373	716,089,900; 0.000661	1,030,034,600; 0.000951	515,784,000; 0.000476
Mass^{[t]}	kg :E^{[f]}	5.48×10^{20} 0.0001	(1.212±0.005)×10^{21} 0.0002	1.75×10^{21} 0.0003	?
Density^{[t]}	g/cm^{3}	1.4±0.2	≈ 1.751±0.013	1.74±0.16	?
Equatorial gravity^{[d]}	m/s^{2} g	0.17; 0.017	0.25; 0.025	0.31; 0.029	?
Escape velocity^{[e]}	km/s	0.41	0.53	0.62	?
Rotation period^{[g]}	days	9.54?	0.7367	0.9333	0.4280
Orbital period^{[g]}	years	247.49	287.97	552.52	12,059
Mean orbital speed^{[o]}	km/s	4.68	4.52	3.63	1.04
Eccentricity		0.226	0.038	0.506	0.855
Inclination^{[f]}	deg.	20.59	7.99	30.74	11.93
Axial tilt^{[i]}	deg.	?	13.6 or 14.0	?	?
Mean surface temperature^{[w]}	K	≈ 42	≈ 41	≈ 30	≈ 12
Number of known moons		1	1 (2?)	1	0
Rings?		?	Yes	?	?
Planetary discriminant^{[l]}^{[o]}		0.003	0.0015	<0.1	?^{[x]}
Absolute magnitude (H)		2.3	2.71	1.8	1.5

As for objects in the asteroid belt, none are generally agreed as dwarf planets today among astronomers other than Ceres. The second- through fifth-largest asteroids have been discussed as candidates. Vesta (radius 262.7±0.1 km), the second-largest asteroid, appears to have a differentiated interior and therefore likely was once a dwarf planet, but it is no longer very round today. Pallas (radius 255.5±2 km), the third-largest asteroid, appears never to have completed differentiation and likewise has an irregular shape. Vesta and Pallas are nonetheless sometimes considered small terrestrial planets anyway by sources preferring a geophysical definition, because they do share similarities to the rocky planets of the inner solar system. The fourth-largest asteroid, Hygiea (radius 216.5±4 km), is icy. The question remains open if it is currently in hydrostatic equilibrium: while Hygiea is round today, it was probably previously catastrophically disrupted and today might be just a gravitational aggregate of the pieces. The fifth-largest asteroid, Interamnia (radius 166±3 km), is icy and has a shape consistent with hydrostatic equilibrium for a slightly shorter rotation period than it now has.

== Natural satellites ==
There are 19 natural satellites in the Solar System that are known to be massive enough to be close to hydrostatic equilibrium: seven of Saturn, five of Uranus, four of Jupiter, and one each of Earth, Neptune, and Pluto. Alan Stern calls these satellite planets, although the term major moon is more common. The smallest natural satellite that is gravitationally rounded is Saturn I Mimas (radius 198.2±0.4 km). This is smaller than the largest natural satellite that is known not to be gravitationally rounded, Neptune VIII Proteus (radius 210±7 km).

Several of these were once in equilibrium but are no longer: these include Earth's Moon and all of the moons listed for Saturn apart from Titan and Rhea. The status of Callisto, Titan, and Rhea is uncertain, as is that of the moons of Uranus and Pluto's moon Charon. The other large moons (Io, Europa, Ganymede, and Triton) are generally believed to still be in equilibrium today. Other moons that were once in equilibrium but are no longer very round, such as Saturn IX Phoebe (radius 106.5±0.7 km), are not included. In addition to not being in equilibrium, Mimas and Tethys have very low densities and it has been suggested that they may have non-negligible internal porosity, in which case they would not be satellite planets.

The moons of the trans-Neptunian objects (other than Charon) have not been included, because they appear to follow the normal situation for TNOs rather than the moons of Saturn and Uranus, and become solid at a larger size (900–1000 km diameter, rather than 400 km as for the moons of Saturn and Uranus). Eris I Dysnomia and Orcus I Vanth, though larger than Mimas, are dark bodies in the size range that should allow for internal porosity, and in the case of Dysnomia a low density is known.

Satellites are listed first in order from the Sun, and second in order from their parent body. For the round moons, this mostly matches the Roman numeral designations, with the exceptions of Iapetus and the Uranian system. This is because the Roman numeral designations originally reflected distance from the parent planet and were updated for each new discovery until 1851, but by 1892, the numbering system for the then-known satellites had become "frozen" and from then on followed order of discovery. Thus Miranda (discovered 1948) is Uranus V despite being the innermost of Uranus' five round satellites. The missing Saturn VII is Hyperion, which is not large enough to be round (mean radius 135±4 km).

Key
^{🜨} Satellite of Earth
^{♃} Satellite of Jupiter
^{♄} Satellite of Saturn
^{⛢} Satellite of Uranus
^{♆} Satellite of Neptune
^{♇} Satellite of Pluto

		^{🜨}Moon	^{♃}Io	^{♃}Europa	^{♃}Ganymede	^{♃}Callisto	^{♄}Mimas^{[p]}	^{♄}Enceladus^{[p]}	^{♄}Tethys^{[p]}	^{♄}Dione^{[p]}	^{♄}Rhea^{[p]}
Roman numeral designation		Earth I	Jupiter I	Jupiter II	Jupiter III	Jupiter IV	Saturn I	Saturn II	Saturn III	Saturn IV	Saturn V
Symbol^{[q]}		☾	JI	JII	JIII	JIV	SI	SII	SIII	SIV	SV
Symbol (Unicode)^{[q]}		☾									
Discovery year		Prehistoric	1610	1610	1610	1610	1789	1789	1684	1684	1672
Mean distance from primary	km	384,399	421,600	670,900	1,070,400	1,882,700	185,520	237,948	294,619	377,396	527,108
Mean radius	km :E^{[f]}	1,737.1; 0.272	1,815; 0.285	1,569; 0.246	2,634.1; 0.413	2,410.3; 0.378	198.30; 0.031	252.1; 0.04	533; 0.084	561.7; 0.088	764.3; 0.12
Surface area^{[a]}	1×10^{6} km^{2}	37.93	41.910	30.9	87.0	73	0.49	0.799	3.57	3.965	7.337
Volume^{[b]}	1×10^{9} km^{3}	22	25.3	15.9	76	59	0.033	0.067	0.63	0.8	1.9
Mass	1×10^{22} kg	7.3477	8.94	4.80	14.819	10.758	0.00375	0.0108	0.06174	0.1095	0.2306
Density^{[c]}	g/cm^{3}	3.3464	3.528	3.01	1.936	1.83	1.15	1.61	0.98	1.48	1.23
Equatorial gravity^{[d]}	m/s^{2} g	1.622; 0.1654	1.796; 0.1831	1.314; 0.1340	1.428; 0.1456	1.235; 0.1259	0.0636; 0.00649	0.111; 0.0113	0.145; 0.0148	0.231; 0.0236	0.264; 0.0269
Escape velocity^{[e]}	km/s	2.38	2.56	2.025	2.741	2.440	0.159	0.239	0.393	0.510	0.635
Rotation period	days^{[g]}	27.321582 (sync)^{[m]}	1.7691378 (sync)	3.551181 (sync)	7.154553 (sync)	16.68902 (sync)	0.942422 (sync)	1.370218 (sync)	1.887802 (sync)	2.736915 (sync)	4.518212 (sync)
Orbital period about primary	days^{[g]}	27.32158	1.769138	3.551181	7.154553	16.68902	0.942422	1.370218	1.887802	2.736915	4.518212
Mean orbital speed^{[o]}	km/s	1.022	17.34	13.740	10.880	8.204	14.32	12.63	11.35	10.03	8.48
Eccentricity		0.0549	0.0041	0.009	0.0013	0.0074	0.0202	0.0047	0.02	0.002	0.001
Inclination to primary's equator	deg.	18.29–28.58	0.04	0.47	1.85	0.2	1.51	0.02	1.51	0.019	0.345
Axial tilt^{[i]}^{[u]}	deg.	6.68	0.000405 ± 0.00076	0.0965 ± 0.0069	0.155 ± 0.065	≈ 0–2^{[aa]}	≈ 0	≈ 0	≈ 0	≈ 0	≈ 0
Mean surface temperature^{[w]}	K	220	130	102	110	134	64	75	64	87	76
Atmospheric composition		Ar, He; Na, K, H	SO_{2}	O_{2}	O_{2}	O_{2}, CO_{2}		H_{2}O, N_{2} CO_{2}, CH_{4}			

		^{♄}Titan^{[p]}	^{♄}Iapetus^{[p]}	^{⛢}Miranda^{[r]}	^{⛢}Ariel^{[r]}	^{⛢}Umbriel^{[r]}	^{⛢}Titania^{[r]}	^{⛢}Oberon^{[r]}	^{♆}Triton	^{♇}Charon
Roman numeral designation		Saturn VI	Saturn VIII	Uranus V	Uranus I	Uranus II	Uranus III	Uranus IV	Neptune I	Pluto I
Symbol		SVI	SVIII	UV	UI	UII	UIII	UIV	NI	PI
Discovery year		1655	1671	1948	1851	1851	1787	1787	1846	1978
Mean distance from primary	km	1,221,870	3,560,820	129,390	190,900	266,000	436,300	583,519	354,759	17,536
Mean radius	km :E^{[f]}	2,576; 0.404	735.60; 0.115	235.8; 0.037	578.9; 0.091	582.4; 0.092	788.9; 0.124	761.4; 0.119	1,353.4; 0.212	603.5; 0.095
Surface area^{[a]}	1×10^{6} km^{2}	83.0	6.7	0.70	4.211	4.296	7.82	7.285	23.018	4.580
Volume^{[b]}	1×10^{9} km^{3}	71.6	1.67	0.055	0.81	0.84	2.06	1.85	10	0.92
Mass	1×10^{22} kg	13.452	0.18053	0.00659	0.135	0.12	0.35	0.3014	2.14	0.152
Density^{[c]}	g/cm^{3}	1.88	1.08	1.20	1.67	1.40	1.72	1.63	2.061	1.65
Equatorial gravity^{[d]}	m/s^{2} g	1.35; 0.138	0.22; 0.022	0.08; 0.008	0.27; 0.028	0.23; 0.023	0.39; 0.040	0.35; 0.036	0.78; 0.080	0.28; 0.029
Escape velocity^{[e]}	km/s	2.64	0.57	0.19	0.56	0.52	0.77	0.73	1.46	0.58
Rotation period	days^{[g]}	15.945 (sync)^{[m]}	79.322 (sync)	1.414 (sync)	2.52 (sync)	4.144 (sync)	8.706 (sync)	13.46 (sync)	5.877 (sync)	6.387 (sync)
Orbital period about primary	days	15.945	79.322	1.4135	2.520	4.144	8.706	13.46	5.877	6.387
Mean orbital speed^{[o]}	km/s	5.57	3.265	6.657	5.50898	4.66797	3.644	3.152	4.39	0.2
Eccentricity		0.0288	0.0286	0.0013	0.0012	0.005	0.0011	0.0014	0.00002	0.0022
Inclination to primary's equator	deg.	0.33	14.72	4.22	0.31	0.36	0.14	0.10	157^{[h]}	0.001
Axial tilt^{[i]}^{[u]}	deg.	≈ 0.3	≈ 0	≈ 0	≈ 0	≈ 0	≈ 0	≈ 0	≈ 0.7	≈ 0
Mean surface temperature^{[w]}	K	93.7	130	59	58	61	60	61	38	53
Atmospheric composition		N_{2}, CH_{4}							N_{2}, CH_{4}	

== See also ==
- List of Solar System objects by size
- Lists of astronomical objects
- List of former planets
- Planetary-mass object

== Notes ==
=== Unless otherwise cited^{[z]} ===
15. The planetary discriminant for the planets is taken from material published by Stephen Soter. Planetary discriminants for Ceres, Pluto and Eris taken from Soter, 2006. Planetary discriminants of all other bodies calculated from the Kuiper belt mass estimate given by Lorenzo Iorio.
16. Saturn satellite info taken from NASA Saturnian Satellite Fact Sheet.
17. With the exception of the Sun and Earth symbols, astronomical symbols are mostly used by astrologers today; although occasional use of the other symbols in astronomical contexts still exists, it is officially discouraged. All symbols encoded in Unicode have been included.
  - Astronomical symbols for the Sun, the planets (first symbol for Uranus), and the Moon, as well as the first symbol for Pluto were taken from NASA Solar System Exploration.
  - The symbol for Ceres, as well as the second symbol for Uranus, was taken from material published by James L. Hilton.
  - The other dwarf-planet symbols were invented by Denis Moskowitz, a software engineer in Massachusetts. His symbols for Haumea, Makemake, and Eris appear in a NASA JPL infographic, as does the second symbol for Pluto. His symbols for Quaoar, Sedna, Orcus, and Gonggong were taken from Unicode; his symbol for Salacia is mentioned in two Unicode proposals, but has not been included.
  The Moon is the only natural satellite with a standard abstract symbol; abstract symbols have been proposed for the others, but have not received significant astronomical or astrological use or mention. The others are often referred to with the initial letter of their parent planet and their Roman numeral.
18. Uranus satellite info taken from NASA Uranian Satellite Fact Sheet.
19. Radii for plutoid candidates taken from material published by John A. Stansberry et al.
21. Axial tilts for most satellites assumed to be zero in accordance with the Explanatory Supplement to the Astronomical Almanac: "In the absence of other information, the axis of rotation is assumed to be normal to the mean orbital plane."
22. Natural satellite numbers taken from the list published by the Jet Propulsion Laboratory.

=== Manual calculations (unless otherwise cited) ===
1. Surface area A derived from the radius using $A=4\pi r^2$, assuming sphericity.
2. Volume V derived from the radius using $V=\frac{4}{3}\pi r^3$, assuming sphericity.
3. Density derived from the mass divided by the volume.
4. Surface gravity derived from the mass m, the gravitational constant G and the radius r: Gm/r^{2}.
5. Escape velocity derived from the mass m, the gravitational constant G and the radius r: √(2Gm)/r.
14. Orbital speed is calculated using the mean orbital radius and the orbital period, assuming a circular orbit.
20. Assuming a density of 2.0
23. Calculated using the formula $T\ =\ \frac{T_{\textrm{eff}}(1-qp_\nu)^{1/4}}{\sqrt 2} \sqrt{52/r},$ where T_{eff} = 54.8 K at 52 AU, $p_\nu$ is the geometric albedo, q = 0.8 is the phase integral, and $r$ is the distance from the Sun in AU. This formula is a simplified version of that in section 2.2 of Stansberry et al., 2007, where emissivity and beaming parameter were assumed to equal unity, and $\pi$ was replaced with 4, accounting for the difference between circle and sphere. All parameters mentioned above were taken from the same paper.

=== Individual calculations ===
25. Surface area was calculated using the formula for a scalene ellipsoid:
  $2\pi\left(c^2+b\sqrt{a^2-c^2}E(\alpha,m)+\frac{bc^2}{\sqrt{a^2-c^2}}F(\alpha,m)\right),$ where $\alpha=\arccos\left(\frac{c}{a}\right)$ is the modular angle, or angular eccentricity; $m=\frac{b^2-c^2}{b^2\sin(\alpha)^2}$ and $F(\alpha,m)$, $E(\alpha,m)$ are the incomplete elliptic integrals of the first and second kind, respectively. The values 980 km, 759 km, and 498 km were used for a, b, and c respectively.

=== Other notes ===
6. Relative to Earth
7. Sidereal
8. Retrograde
9. The inclination of the body's equator from its orbit.
10. At pressure of 1 bar
11. At sea level
12. The ratio between the mass of the object and those in its immediate neighborhood. Used to distinguish between a planet and a dwarf planet.
13. This object's rotation is synchronous with its orbital period, meaning that it only ever shows one face to its primary.
24. Objects' planetary discriminants based on their similar orbits to Eris. Sedna's population is currently too little-known for a planetary discriminant to be determined.
26. "Unless otherwise cited" means that the information contained in the citation is applicable to an entire line or column of a chart, unless another citation specifically notes otherwise. For example, Titan's mean surface temperature is cited to the reference in its cell; it is not calculated like the temperatures of most of the other satellites here, because it has an atmosphere that makes the formula inapplicable.
27. Callisto's axial tilt varies between 0 and about 2 degrees on timescales of thousands of years.
