= Potato radius =

The potato radius is the size at which an asteroid is massive enough that gravity begins to make it rounder. The potato radius defines hydrostatic equilibrium and is used to separate dwarf planets from small Solar System bodies. Charles Lineweaver and Marc Norman at the Australian National University in Canberra first proposed an objective definition of a planet that separates potato-like objects from spherical ones.

== See also ==
- Dwarf planet § Hydrostatic equilibrium
- Hydrostatic equilibrium
- Radius of dominance
