= Clearing the neighbourhood =

Criterion for a celestial body to be considered a planet

In celestial mechanics, "clearing the neighbourhood" (or dynamical dominance) around a celestial body's orbit describes the body becoming gravitationally dominant such that there are no other bodies of comparable size other than its natural satellites or those otherwise under its gravitational influence.

"Clearing the neighbourhood" is one of three necessary criteria for a celestial body to be considered a planet in the Solar System, according to the definition adopted in 2006 by the International Astronomical Union (IAU). In 2015, a proposal was made to extend the definition to exoplanets.

In the end stages of planet formation, a planet, as so defined, will have "cleared the neighbourhood" of its own orbital zone, i.e. removed other bodies of comparable size. A large body that meets the other criteria for a planet but has not cleared its neighbourhood is classified as a dwarf planet. This includes Pluto, whose orbit is partly inside Neptune's and shares its orbital neighbourhood with many Kuiper belt objects. The IAU's definition does not attach specific numbers or equations to this term, but all IAU-recognised planets have cleared their neighbourhoods to a much greater extent (by orders of magnitude) than any dwarf planet or candidate for dwarf planet.

The phrase stems from a paper presented to the 2000 IAU general assembly by the planetary scientists Alan Stern and Harold F. Levison. The authors used several similar phrases as they developed a theoretical basis for determining if an object orbiting a star is likely to "clear its neighboring region" of planetesimals based on the object's mass and its orbital period. Steven Soter prefers to use the term dynamical dominance, and Jean-Luc Margot notes that such language "seems less prone to misinterpretation".

Prior to 2006, the IAU had no specific rules for naming planets, as no new planets had been discovered for decades, whereas there were well-established rules for naming an abundance of newly discovered small bodies such as asteroids or comets. The naming process for Eris stalled after the announcement of its discovery in 2005, because its size was comparable to that of Pluto. The IAU sought to resolve the naming of Eris by seeking a taxonomical definition to distinguish planets from minor planets.

== Criteria ==
The phrase refers to an orbiting body (a planet or protoplanet) "sweeping out" its orbital region over time, by gravitationally interacting with smaller bodies nearby. Over many orbital cycles, a large body will tend to cause small bodies either to accrete with it, or to be disturbed to another orbit, or to be captured either as a satellite or into a resonant orbit. As a consequence it does not then share its orbital region with other bodies of significant size, except for its own satellites, or other bodies governed by its own gravitational influence. This latter restriction excludes objects whose orbits may cross but that will never collide with each other due to orbital resonance, such as Jupiter and its trojans, Earth and 3753 Cruithne, or Neptune and the plutinos. As to the extent of orbit clearing required, Jean-Luc Margot emphasises "a planet can never completely clear its orbital zone, because gravitational and radiative forces continually perturb the orbits of asteroids and comets into planet-crossing orbits" and states that the IAU did not intend the impossible standard of impeccable orbit clearing.

=== Stern–Levison's Λ ===
In their paper, Stern and Levison sought an algorithm to determine which "planetary bodies control the region surrounding them". They defined Λ (lambda), a measure of a body's ability to scatter smaller masses out of its orbital region over a period of time equal to the age of the Universe (Hubble time). Λ is a dimensionless number defined as

$$\Lambda = \frac{m^2}{a^{3/2}}\,k$$

where m is the mass of the body, a is the body's semi-major axis, and k is a function of the orbital elements of the small body being scattered and the degree to which it must be scattered. In the domain of the solar planetary disc, there is little variation in the average values of k for small bodies at a particular distance from the Sun.

If Λ > 1, then the body will likely clear out the small bodies in its orbital zone. Stern and Levison used this discriminant to separate the gravitationally rounded, Sun-orbiting bodies into überplanets, which are "dynamically important enough to have cleared [their] neighboring planetesimals", and unterplanets. The überplanets are the eight most massive solar orbiters (i.e. the IAU planets), and the unterplanets are the rest (i.e. the IAU dwarf planets).

=== Soter's μ ===
Steven Soter proposed an observationally based measure μ (mu), which he called the "planetary discriminant", to separate bodies orbiting stars into planets and non-planets. He defines μ as
$$\mu = \frac{M}{m}$$
where μ is a dimensionless parameter, M is the mass of the candidate planet, and m is the mass of all other bodies that share an orbital zone, that is all bodies whose orbits cross a common radial distance from the primary, and whose non-resonant periods differ by less than an order of magnitude.

The order-of-magnitude similarity in period requirement excludes comets from the calculation, but the combined mass of the comets turns out to be negligible compared with the other small Solar System bodies, so their inclusion would have little impact on the results. μ is then calculated by dividing the mass of the candidate body by the total mass of the other objects that share its orbital zone. It is a measure of the actual degree of cleanliness of the orbital zone. Soter proposed that if μ > 100, then the candidate body be regarded as a planet.

=== Margot's Π ===
Astronomer Jean-Luc Margot has proposed a discriminant, Π (pi), that can categorise a body based only on its own mass, its semi-major axis, and its star's mass. Like Stern–Levison's Λ, Π is a measure of the ability of the body to clear its orbit, but unlike Λ, it is solely based on theory and does not use empirical data from the Solar System. Π is based on properties that are feasibly determinable even for exoplanetary bodies, unlike Soter's μ, which requires an accurate census of the orbital zone.

$$\Pi = \frac{m}{M^{5/2}a^{9/8}}\,k$$

where m is the mass of the candidate body in Earth masses, a is its semi-major axis in AU, M is the mass of the parent star in solar masses, and k is a constant chosen so that Π > 1 for a body that can clear its orbital zone. k depends on the extent of clearing desired and the time required to do so. Margot selected an extent of $2\sqrt{3}$ times the Hill radius and a time limit of the parent star's lifetime on the main sequence (which is a function of the mass of the star). Then, in the mentioned units and a main-sequence lifetime of 10 billion years, k = 807. (Note: This expression for k can be derived by following Margot's paper as follows: The time required for a body of mass m in orbit around a body of mass M with an orbital period P is: $$t_\text{clear} = P \frac{\delta x^2}{D_x ^2}$$ With $\delta x \simeq \frac{C}{a} \left(\frac{m}{3M}\right)^{1/3}, D_x \simeq \frac{10}{a} \frac{m}{M}, P = 2 \pi \sqrt{\frac{a^3}{GM}},$ and C the number of Hill radii to be cleared. This gives $$t_\text{clear} = 2 \pi \sqrt{\frac{a^3}{GM}} \frac{C^2}{a^2} \left(\frac{m}{3M}\right)^{2/3} \frac{a^2 M^2}{100 m^2} = \frac{2 \pi}{100 \sqrt{G}} \frac{C^2}{3^{2/3}} a^{3/2} M^{5/6} m^{-4/3}$$ requiring that the clearing time $t_\text{clear}$ to be less than a characteristic timescale $t_*$gives: $$t_* \ge t_\text{clear} = 2 \pi \sqrt{\frac{a^3}{GM}} \frac{C^2}{a^2} \left(\frac{m}{3M}\right)^{2/3} \frac{a^2 M^2}{100 m^2} = \frac{2 \pi}{100 \sqrt{G}} \frac{C^2}{3^{2/3}} a^{3/2} M^{5/6} m^{-4/3}$$ this means that a body with a mass m can clear its orbit within the designated timescale if it satisfies $$m \ge {\left[ \frac{2 \pi}{100 \sqrt{G}} \frac{C^2}{3^{2/3} t_*} a^{3/2} M^{5/6} \right]}^{3/4} = { {\left(\frac{2 \pi}{100 \sqrt{G}}\right)}^{3/4} \frac{C^{3/2}}{\sqrt{3} {t_*}^{3/4}} a^{9/8} M^{5/8} }$$ This can be rewritten as follows $$\frac{m}{m_\text{Earth}} \ge { {\left(\frac{2 \pi}{100 \sqrt{G}}\right)}^{3/4} \frac{C^{3/2}}{\sqrt{3} {t_*}^{3/4}} {\left(\frac{a}{a_\text{Earth}}\right)}^{9/8} {\left(\frac{M}{M_\text{Sun}}\right)}^{5/8} \frac{a_\text{Earth}^{9/8} M_\text{Sun}^{5/8}}{m_\text{Earth}}}$$ so that the variables can be changed to use solar masses, Earth masses, and distances in AU by $\frac{M}{M_\text{Sun}} \to \bar M , \frac{m}{m_\text{Earth}} \to \bar m ,$ and $\frac{a}{a_{Earth}} \to \bar a$ Then, equating $t_*$ to be the main-sequence lifetime of the star $t_\text{MS}$, the above expression can be rewritten using $$t_* \simeq t_\text{MS} \propto {\left(\frac{M}{M_\text{Sun}}\right)}^{-5/2}t_{Sun} ,$$ with $t_\text{Sun}$ the main-sequence lifetime of the Sun, and making a similar change in variables to time in years $$\frac{t_\text{Sun}}{P_\text{Earth}} \to \bar t_{Sun} .$$ This then gives $$\bar m \ge {\left(\frac{2 \pi}{100 \sqrt{G}}\right)}^{3/4} \frac{C^{3/2}}{\sqrt{3} {\bar t_\text{Sun}}^{3/4}} \bar a^{9/8} \bar M^{5/2} \frac{a_\text{Earth}^{9/8} M_\text{Sun}^{5/8}}{m_\text{Earth} P_\text{Earth}^{3/4}}$$ Then, the orbital-clearing parameter is the mass of the body divided by the minimum mass required to clear its orbit (which is the right-hand side of the above expression) and leaving out the bars for simplicity gives the expression for Π as given in this article: $$\Pi = \frac{m}{m_\text{clear}} = \frac{m}{a^{9/8} M^{5/2}} {\left(\frac{100 \sqrt{G}}{2 \pi}\right)}^{3/4} \frac{\sqrt{3} {t_\text{Sun}}^{3/4}}{C^{3/2}} \frac{m_\text{Earth} P_\text{Earth}^{3/4}}{a_\text{Earth}^{9/8} M_\text{Sun}^{5/8}} .$$ which means that $$k = {\left(\frac{100 \sqrt{G}}{2 \pi}\right)}^{3/4} \frac{\sqrt{3} {t_\text{Sun}}^{3/4}}{C^{3/2}} m_\text{Earth} P_\text{Earth}^{3/4} a_\text{Earth}^{-9/8} M_\text{Sun}^{-5/8}$$ Earth's orbital period can then be used to remove $a_\text{Earth}$ and $P_\text{Earth}$ from the expression: $$P_\text{Earth} = 2 \pi \sqrt{\frac{{a_\text{Earth}}^3}{M_\text{Sun}G}} ,$$ which gives $$k = {\left(\frac{100 \cancel{\sqrt{G}}}{\cancel{2 \pi}}\right)}^{3/4} \frac{\sqrt{3} {t_\text{Sun}}^{3/4}}{C^{3/2}} m_\text{Earth} {\left(\cancel{2 \pi} \sqrt{\frac{\cancel{{a_\text{Earth}}^3}}{M_\text{Sun}\cancel{G}}}\right)}^{3/4} \cancel{a_\text{Earth}^{-9/8}} M_\text{Sun}^{-5/8} ,$$ so that this becomes $$k = \sqrt{3} C^{-3/2} (100 t_\text{Sun})^{3/4} \frac{m_\text{Earth}}{M_\text{Sun}}$$ Plugging in the numbers gives k = 807.) The body is a planet if Π > 1. The minimum mass necessary to clear the given orbit is given when Π = 1.

Π is based on a calculation of the number of orbits required for the candidate body to impart enough energy to a small body in a nearby orbit such that the smaller body is cleared out of the desired orbital extent. This is unlike Λ, which uses an average of the clearing times required for a sample of asteroids in the asteroid belt, and is thus biased to that region of the Solar System. Π's use of the main-sequence lifetime means that the body will eventually clear an orbit around the star; Λ's use of a Hubble time means that the star might disrupt its planetary system (e.g. by going nova) before the object is actually able to clear its orbit.

The formula for Π assumes a circular orbit. Its adaptation to elliptical orbits is left for future work, but Margot expects it to be the same as that of a circular orbit to within an order of magnitude.

To accommodate planets in orbit around brown dwarfs, an updated version of the criterion with a uniform clearing time scale of 10 billion years was published in 2024. The values of Π for Solar System bodies remain unchanged.

== Numerical values ==
Below is a list of planets and dwarf planets ranked by Margot's planetary discriminant Π, in decreasing order. For all eight planets defined by the IAU, Π is orders of magnitude greater than 1, whereas for all dwarf planets, Π is orders of magnitude less than 1. Also listed are Stern–Levison's Λ and Soter's μ; again, the planets are orders of magnitude greater than 1 for Λ and 100 for μ, and the dwarf planets are orders of magnitude less than 1 for Λ and 100 for μ. Also shown are the distances where Π = 1 and Λ = 1 (where the body would change from being a planet to being a dwarf planet).

The mass of Sedna is not known; it is very roughly estimated here as 10^{21} kg, on the assumption of a density of about 2 g/cm^{3}.

Rank	Name	Margot's planetary discriminant Π	Soter's planetary discriminant μ	Stern–Levison parameter Λ (Note: These values are based on a value of k estimated for Ceres and the asteroid belt: k equals 1.53×10^{5} AU^{1.5}/M_{🜨}^{2}, where AU is the astronomical unit and M_{🜨} is the mass of Earth. Accordingly, Λ is dimensionless.)	Mass (kg)	Type of object	Π = 1 distance (AU)	Λ = 1 distance (AU)
1	Jupiter	40,115	625000	1300000000	1.8986×10^{27}	5th planet	64,000	6,220,000
2	Saturn	6,044	190000	46800000	5.6846×10^{26}	6th planet	22,000	1,250,000
3	Venus	947	1300000	166000	4.8685×10^{24}	2nd planet	320	2,180
4	Earth	807	1700000	153000	5.9736×10^{24}	3rd planet	380	2,870
5	Uranus	423	29000	384000	8.6832×10^{25}	7th planet	4,100	102,000
6	Neptune	301	24000	273000	1.0243×10^{26}	8th planet	4,800	127,000
7	Mercury	129	91000	1950	3.3022×10^{23}	1st planet	29	60
8	Mars	54	5100	942	6.4185×10^{23}	4th planet	53	146
9	Ceres	0.04	0.33	0.000832	9.43×10^{20}	dwarf planet	0.16	0.024
10	Pluto	0.028	0.08	0.00295	1.29×10^{22}	dwarf planet	1.70	0.812
11	Eris	0.020	0.10	0.00215	1.67×10^{22}	dwarf planet	2.10	1.130
12	Haumea	0.0078	0.02	0.000241	4.0×10^{21}	dwarf planet	0.58	0.168
13	Makemake	0.0073	0.02	0.000222	~4.0×10^{21}	dwarf planet	0.58	0.168
15	Gonggong	0.0021	0.009	0.000025	1.8×10^{21}	dwarf planet		
14	Quaoar	0.0027	0.007	0.000029	1.4×10^{21}	dwarf planet		
16	Orcus	0.0014	0.003	0.0000069	6.3×10^{20}	dwarf planet		
17	Sedna	~0.0001	<0.07	0.000000364	?	dwarf planet		

== Disagreement ==
Orbits of celestial bodies in the Kuiper belt with approximate distances and inclination. Objects marked with red are in orbital resonances with Neptune, with Pluto (the largest red circle) located in the "spike" of plutinos at the 2:3 resonance

Stern, the principal investigator of the New Horizons mission to Pluto, disagreed with the reclassification of Pluto on the basis of its inability to clear a neighbourhood. He argued that the IAU's wording is vague, and that — like Pluto — Earth, Mars, Jupiter and Neptune have not cleared their orbital neighbourhoods either. Earth co-orbits with 10,000 near-Earth asteroids (NEAs), and Jupiter has 100,000 trojans in its orbital path. "If Neptune had cleared its zone, Pluto wouldn't be there", he said.

The IAU category of 'planets' is nearly identical to Stern's own proposed category of 'überplanets'. In the paper proposing Stern and Levison's Λ discriminant, they stated, "we define an überplanet as a planetary body in orbit about a star that is dynamically important enough to have cleared its neighboring planetesimals ..." and a few paragraphs later, "From a dynamical standpoint, our solar system clearly contains 8 überplanets" — including Earth, Mars, Jupiter, and Neptune. Although Stern proposed this to define dynamical subcategories of planets, he rejected it for defining what a planet is, advocating the use of intrinsic attributes over dynamical relationships.

== See also ==
- List of Solar System objects
- List of gravitationally rounded objects of the Solar System
- List of Solar System objects by size
- List of notable asteroids
- Sphere of influence (astrodynamics)
