= Small Solar System body =

Object in the Solar System

Euler diagram showing the types of bodies in the Solar System

A small Solar System body (SSSB) is an object in the Solar System that is neither a planet, a dwarf planet, nor a natural satellite. The term was first defined in 2006 by the International Astronomical Union (IAU) as follows: "All other objects, except satellites, orbiting the Sun shall be referred to collectively as 'Small Solar System Bodies'".

This encompasses all comets and all minor planets other than those that are dwarf planets. Thus SSSBs are: the comets; the classical asteroids, with the exception of the dwarf planet Ceres; the trojans; and the centaurs and trans-Neptunian objects, with the exception of the dwarf planets Pluto, Haumea, Makemake, Quaoar, Orcus, Sedna, Gonggong and Eris and others that may turn out to be dwarf planets.

== Definition ==
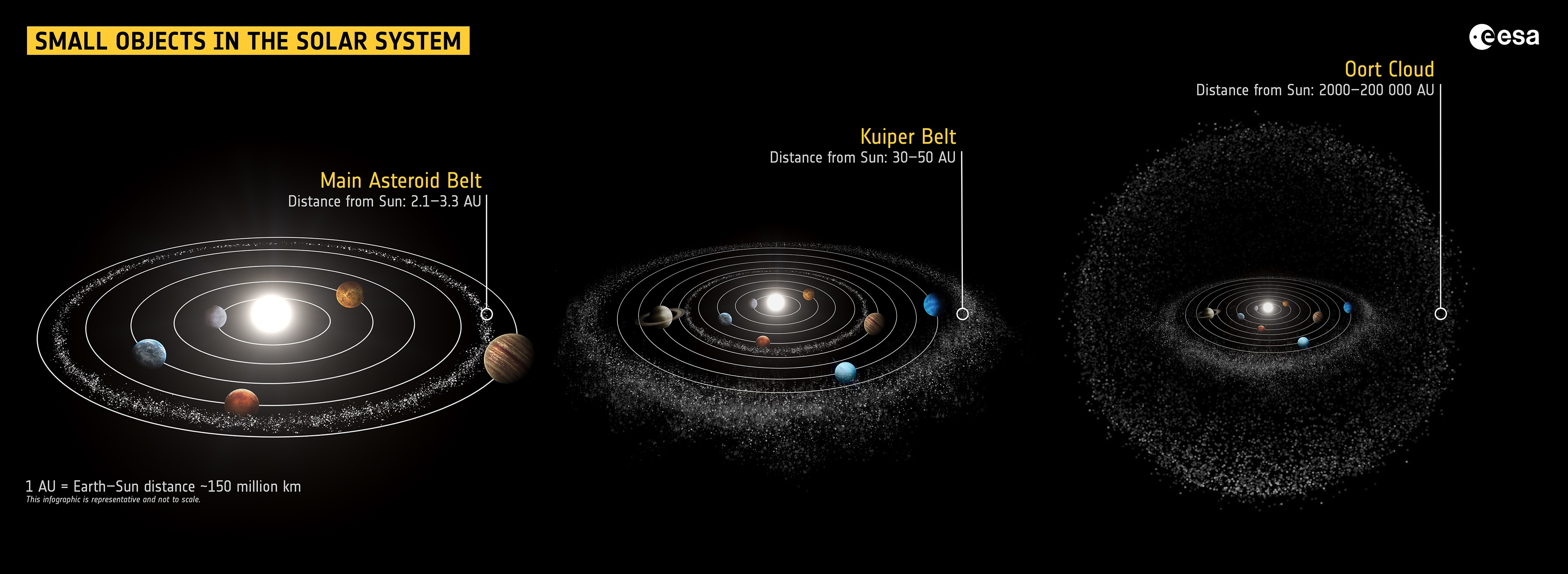
Positions of the main asteroid belt, Kuiper belt, and the Oort cloud in the Solar System

The current definition was included in the 2006 IAU resolution that defined the term planet, demoting the status of Pluto to that of dwarf planet. In the context, it should be interpreted as, "All objects other than planets and dwarf planets orbiting the Sun shall be referred to collectively as 'Small Solar System Bodies'. The definition excludes interstellar objects traveling through the Solar System, such as the interstellar interlopers 1I/ʻOumuamua, 2I/Borisov, and 3I/ATLAS.

It is not presently clear whether a lower size bound will be established as part of the definition of small Solar System bodies in the future, or if it will encompass all material down to the level of meteoroids, the smallest macroscopic bodies in orbit around the Sun. (On a microscopic level there are even smaller objects such as interplanetary dust, particles of solar wind and free particles of hydrogen.)

Except for the largest, which are in hydrostatic equilibrium, natural satellites (moons) differ from small Solar System bodies not in size, but in their orbits. The orbits of natural satellites are not centered on the Sun, but around other Solar System objects such as planets, dwarf planets, and small Solar System bodies.

Some of the larger small Solar System bodies may be reclassified in future as dwarf planets, pending further examination to determine whether or not they are in hydrostatic equilibrium.

The orbits of the vast majority of small Solar System bodies are located in two distinct areas, namely the asteroid belt and the Kuiper belt. These two belts possess some internal structure related to perturbations by the major planets (particularly Jupiter and Neptune, respectively), and have fairly loosely defined boundaries. Other areas of the Solar System also encompass small bodies in smaller concentrations. These include the near-Earth asteroids, centaurs, comets, and scattered disc objects.

== See also ==
- Apollo asteroid
- Centaur (small Solar System body)
- Hungaria asteroids
- List of possible dwarf planets
- List of gravitationally rounded objects of the Solar System
- List of Solar System objects by size
- Lists of small Solar System bodies
- List of minor planets and comets visited by spacecraft
