= S/2015 (136472) 1 =

Moon of Makemake

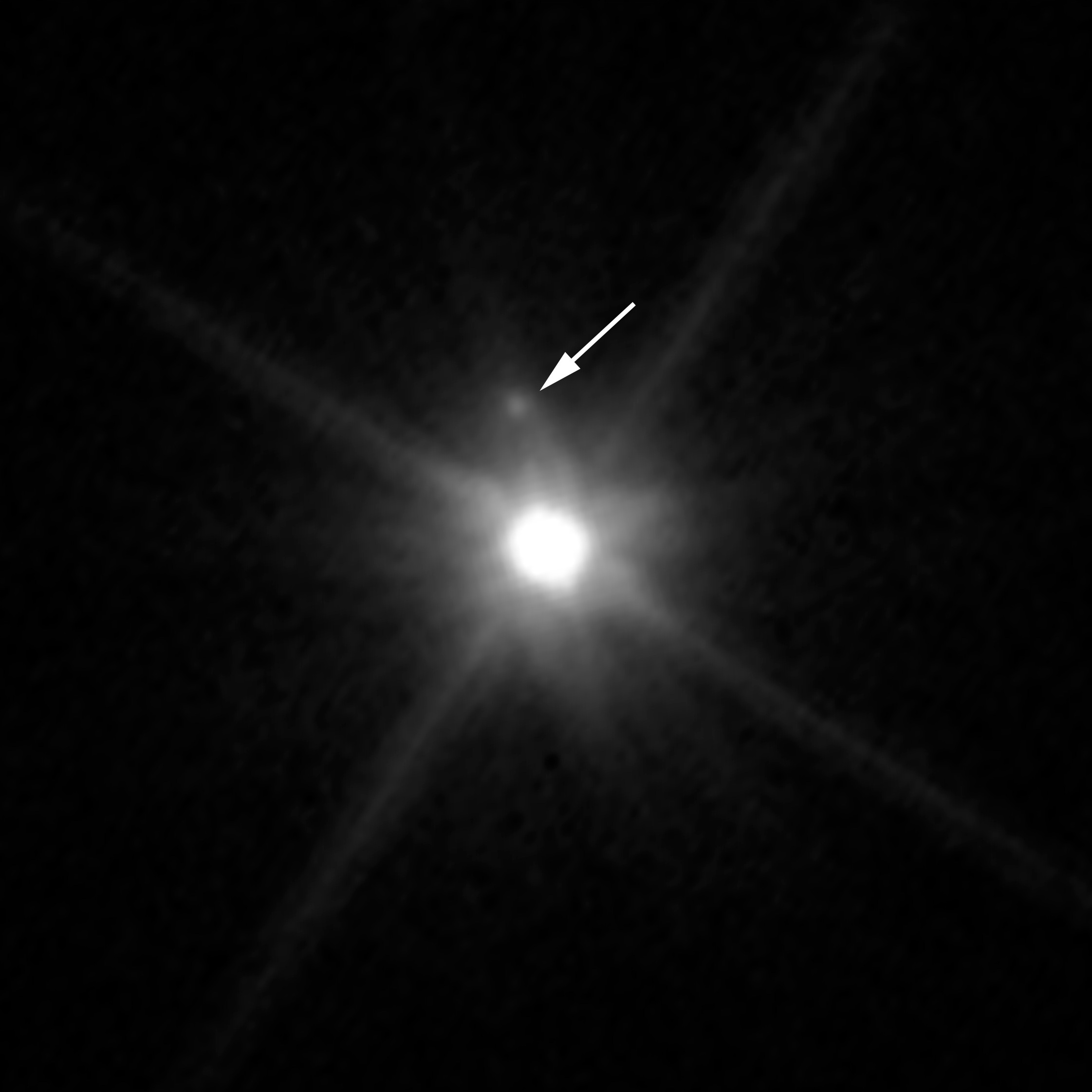
- Makemake and its moon S/2015 (136472) 1, the fainter object pointed at by the arrow

Discovery
- Discovered by: HST/Wide Field Camera 3; Alex H. Parker; Marc W. Buie; William M. Grundy; Keith S. Noll
- Discovery date: 27 April 2015

Designations
- Alternative names: MK 2 (unofficial nickname)

Orbital characteristics
- Semi-major axis: 22250±780 km
- Eccentricity: ≈0
- Orbital period (sidereal): 18.023±0.017 days
- Inclination: 83.7° wrt Earth line of sight 63°–87° wrt ecliptic (prograde)
- Satellite of: Makemake

Physical characteristics
- Mean diameter: ~175 km (4% albedo; best fit); 175–250 km (2–4% albedo) (Note: For a nominal absolute magnitude of 7.8, a geometric albedo of 0.02 gives a diameter of 250 km (160 mi) while a geometric albedo of 0.04 gives a diameter of 175 km (109 mi).)
- Mean radius: 87.5 km
- Albedo: 0.04 (best fit); 0.02–0.04
- Apparent magnitude: 25.0
- Absolute magnitude (H): 7.89±0.04

S/2015 (136472) 1, unofficially nicknamed MK 2 by the discovery team, is the only known moon of Makemake, a dwarf planet located in the Kuiper belt. It is a dark object about 175 km (110 mi) in diameter, orbiting 22,250 km (13,800 mi) away from Makemake with an orbital period of 18 days. Observations leading to its discovery occurred in April 2015, using the Hubble Space Telescope's Wide Field Camera 3, and its discovery was announced on 26 April 2016.

== Physical characteristics ==
S/2015 (136472) 1 is extremely faint, with an apparent magnitude of 25 in visible light. The satellite is 1,300 times fainter than Makemake, corresponding to a magnitude difference of 7.80.

Prior to the discovery of S/2015 (136472) 1, measurements of Makemake's far-infrared thermal emission by the Spitzer and Herschel space telescopes showed that the dwarf planet emits more thermal radiation than expected for its size and brightness in visible light. This led astronomers to suspect that Makemake must have extra dark surface area that is contributing to this excess thermal emission. Makemake does not exhibit significant variations in brightness as it rotates, which leaves the possibilities that some of this dark surface area may either be uniformly distributed on Makemake's surface or is located on satellites orbiting Makemake. The discovery of S/2015 (136472) 1 lends credibility to the hypothesis that Makemake's excess thermal emission largely comes from satellites with dark surfaces.

Assuming S/2015 (136472) 1 has a uniformly dark surface, the satellite has a geometric albedo or visible light reflectivity of 2–4%, which makes it as dark as charcoal. The satellite is exceptionally dark compared to Makemake's geometric albedo of 82%; this may be because the satellite's gravity is too weak to hold on to bright, volatile ices as they sublimate off the satellite's surface into space. S/2015 (136472) 1 is estimated to have a diameter of 175 to 250 km (109 to 155 mi), based on its geometric albedo and brightness in visible light. Within this range, S/2015 (136472) 1's diameter is most likely 175 km (109 mi) for a geometric albedo of 4%. If S/2015 (136472) 1 has the same density as Makemake, then it would contribute less than 0.2% of the total system mass.

== Orbit ==
S/2015 (136472) 1 follows a likely circular orbit around Makemake with an orbital period of 18 days and a semi-major axis of 22,250 ± 780 km (13,830 ± 480 mi). The satellite's orbit is oriented edge-on from the point of view of Earth-based observatories, meaning that the satellite appears to pass in front of or behind Makemake. This would make the satellite difficult to detect because it would be lost in Makemake's glare most of the time; this is the reason why the satellite was not seen in earlier telescope observations. Although it is ambiguous whether the satellite is orbiting Makemake in the prograde or retrograde direction, the satellite's orbital inclination with respect to Earth's line of sight suggests that it may have been eclipsing and occulting Makemake 7±2 years before or after January 2018.

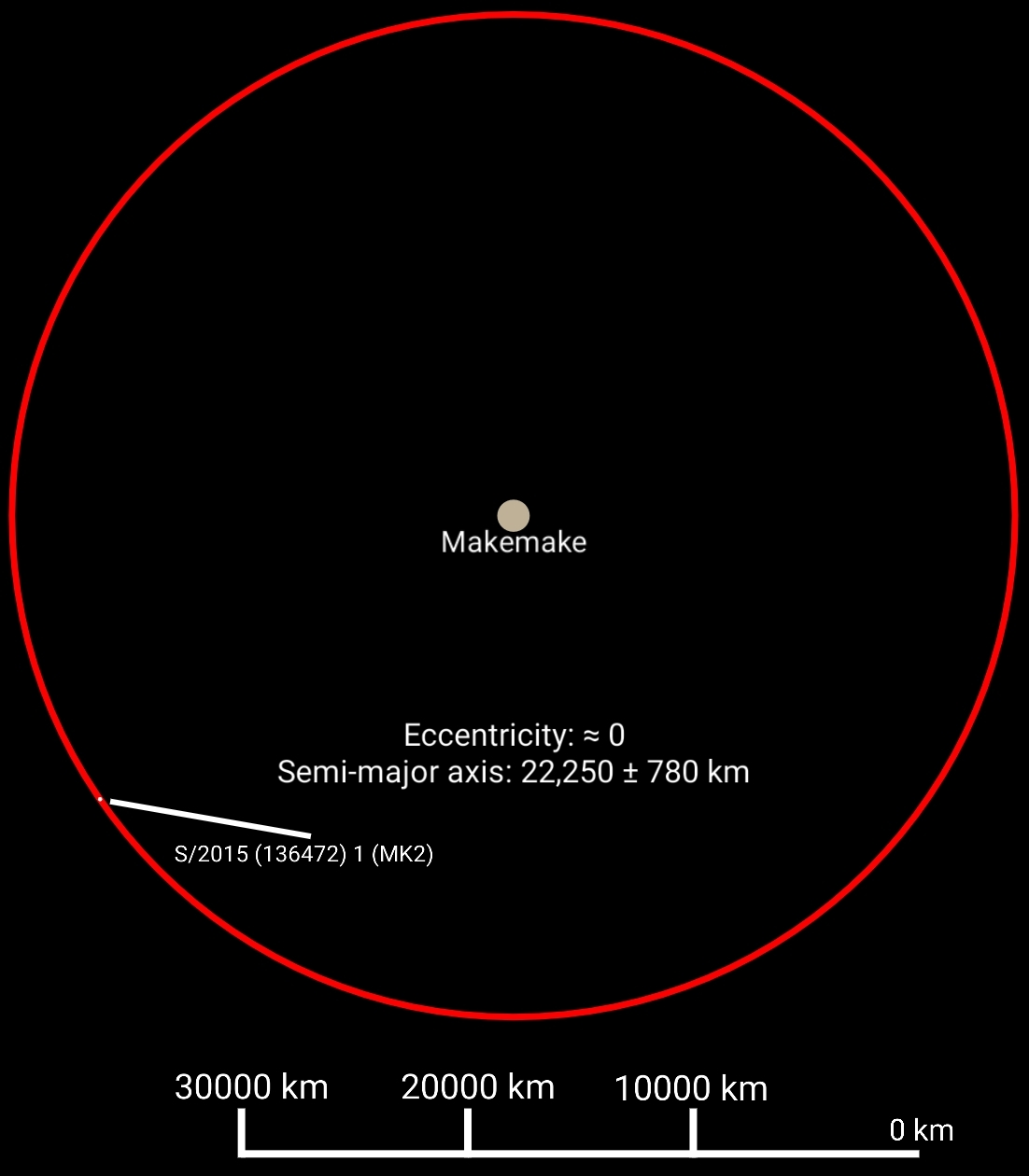
Polar view orbit diagram for S/2015 (136472) 1's orbit around Makemake.

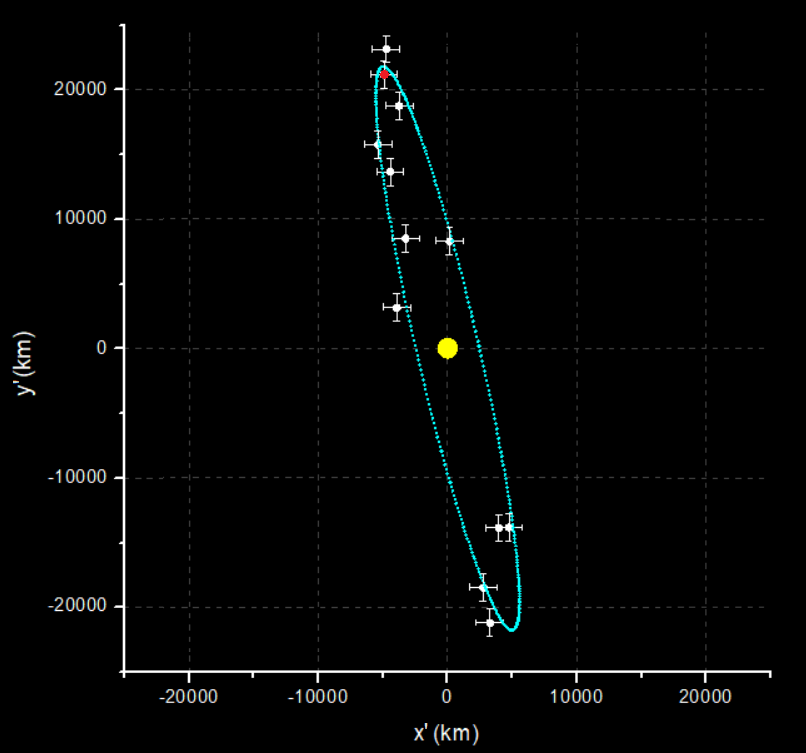
Diagram of S/2015 (136472) 1's orbit as seen from Earth. Measured positions of the moon are plotted as white points.

Animated time lapse of S/2015 (136472) 1 orbiting Makemake, as seen by Hubble during 2018–2019. Makemake appears smudged because its glare has been digitally removed to make the moon more visible.

== Name ==
As of 2025, the satellite has no official name. The designation S/2015 (136472) 1 is the satellite's provisional designation, with "S/" indicating satellite, "2015" being the satellite's year of discovery, and "1" being the satellite's order of discovery in that year. "(136472)" is Makemake's minor-planet number. A permanent name may be chosen from an associated figure in the mythology of Easter Island.
