= Makemake =

Dwarf planet in the Kuiper belt

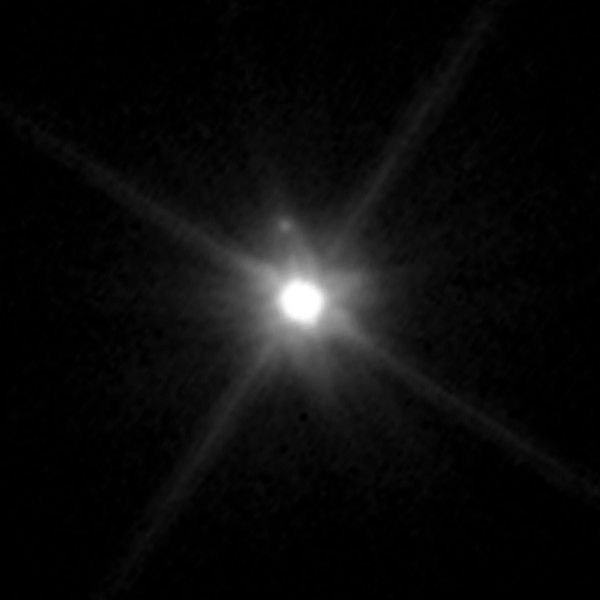
- Low-resolution image of Makemake and its unnamed moon S/2015 (136472) 1 by the Hubble Space Telescope, April 2015

Discovery
- Discovered by: Michael E. Brown; Chad Trujillo; David Rabinowitz
- Discovery site: Palomar Observatory
- Discovery date: March 31, 2005

Designations
- Pronunciation: UK: /ˌmækiˈmæki/, US: /ˌmɑːkiˈmɑːki/ or /ˌmɑːkeɪˈmɑːkeɪ/ (Note: The Rapa Nui pronunciation is [ˈmakeˈmake], which is anglicized as /ˈmækiˈmæki/ in British English, and /ˈmɑːkiˈmɑːki/ or /ˈmɑːkeɪˈmɑːkeɪ/ in American English. The distinction between /ɑː/ and /æ/ reflects how British and American English handles the Polynesian 'a' (parallel to the first 'a' in Italian 'pasta'); the /eɪ/ pronunciation attempts to approximate the Polynesian 'e'.)
- Named after: Makemake
- Alternative designations: (136472) Makemake; 2005 FY_{9} "Easterbunny" (nickname); K05331A (codename)
- Minor planet category: Dwarf planet; TNO; classical (hot)
- Adjectives: Makemakean
- Symbol: (mostly astrological)

Orbital characteristics (barycentric) (Note: These orbital elements are expressed in terms of the Solar System Barycenter (SSB) as the frame of reference. Due to planetary perturbations, the Sun revolves around the SSB at non-negligible distances, so heliocentric-frame orbital elements and distances (such as those given in JPL's Small-Body Database) can vary on short timescales.)
- Epoch November 21, 2025 (JD 2461000.5)
- Uncertainty parameter 1
- Observation arc: 70.53 yr (25,760 d)
- Earliest precovery date: January 29, 1955
- Aphelion: 52.796 AU (7.8982 Tm)
- Perihelion: 38.201 AU (5.7148 Tm)
- Semi-major axis: 45.499 AU (6.8066 Tm)
- Eccentricity: 0.1604
- Orbital period (sidereal): 306.70 yr (112,022 d)
- Mean anomaly: 170.497°
- Mean motion: 0° 0^{m} 11.569^{s} / day
- Inclination: 29.002°
- Longitude of ascending node: 79.441°
- Time of perihelion: 17 November 2186
- Argument of perihelion: 296.065°
- Known satellites: 1 (S/2015 (136472) 1)
- Neptune MOID: 10.9 AU (1.63 billion km)

Physical characteristics
- Dimensions: (1434+48 −18) × (1420+18 −24 km)
- Mean radius: 715±7 km
- Flattening: 0.0098 (Note: Calculated using $\frac{(a-b)}{a}$ and the dimensions from Brown (2013).)
- Surface area: 6.42×10^{6} km^{2} (Note: Calculated using the dimensions from Brown (2013) assuming an oblate spheroid.)
- Volume: 1.53×10^{9} km^{3}
- Mass: (2.69±0.20)×10^{21} kg
- Mean density: 1.76±0.17 g/cm^{3}
- Equatorial surface gravity: 0.35 m/s^{2} (Note: The surface gravity in meters per second squared (m/s^{2}) is calculated according to $\frac{GM}{r^2}$, where G = 6.6743×10^{−11} m^{3}⋅kg^{−1}⋅s^{−2} is the gravitational constant, M is Makemake's mass in kilograms, and r is Makemake's radius in meters.)
- Equatorial escape velocity: 0.71 km/s (Note: The surface escape velocity in meters per second (m/s) is calculated according to $v_{esc} = \sqrt{\frac{2GM}{r}}$, where G = 6.6743×10^{−11} m^{3}⋅kg^{−1}⋅s^{−2} is the gravitational constant, M is Makemake's mass in kilograms, and r is Makemake's radius in meters.)
- Sidereal rotation period: 11.4133 h; or 22.8266±0.0001 h
- Axial tilt: 46°–78° wrt orbit; 63°–87° wrt ecliptic
- Geometric albedo: 0.82±0.02 (geometric); 0.74±0.06 (Bond)
- Temperature: 30–40 K
- Spectral type: B−V = 0.868±0.004; V−R = 0.449±0.003
- Apparent magnitude: 17.0 (opposition)
- Absolute magnitude (H): 0.049±0.020 (corrected); −0.25 (JPL/MPC)
- Angular diameter: 38.28±0.22 milli-arcsec

Makemake (Note: Pronounced as four syllables, with stress on the a's. Values of the vowels vary; see infobox.) (minor-planet number 136472) is a dwarf planet orbiting the Sun in the Kuiper belt, a disc of icy bodies beyond the orbit of Neptune. It is the fourth largest dwarf planet and trans-Neptunian object in the Solar System, having a diameter 60% that of Pluto. It was discovered on March 31, 2005, by American astronomers Michael E. Brown, Chad Trujillo, and David Rabinowitz at Palomar Observatory. As one of the largest outer Solar System objects found by this team, the discovery of Makemake contributed to the reclassification of Pluto as a dwarf planet in 2006.

Makemake's surface is similar to that of Pluto: it is highly reflective, covered largely by frozen methane, and stained reddish-brown by tholins. (Note: In planetary astronomy, the term "red" is used to describe objects that reflect more light at longer (redder) wavelengths. Astronomers have described Makemake and Pluto as having similar "red" colors to each other, although Pluto appears brown to the human eye.) Makemake has one known moon, which has not been named. The orbit of this moon suggests that Makemake's rotation has a high axial tilt, which implies that it experiences extreme seasons. Makemake shows evidence of geochemical activity and cryovolcanism, which has led scientists to suspect that it might harbor a subsurface ocean of liquid water. Gaseous methane has been detected around Makemake, although it is unclear whether it is contained in an atmosphere or comes from temporary outgassing.

No high-resolution images of Makemake's surface exist because it has not been visited up close by a space probe. Makemake is so far from Earth that it appears as a star-like point of light even when viewed through a telescope. Scientists have expressed desire to send a space probe to explore Makemake because of its geological activity and potential subsurface ocean.

== History ==
=== Discovery ===
Makemake was discovered in 2005 by a team of American astronomers consisting of Michael E. Brown, Chad Trujillo, and David Rabinowitz during their search for large objects beyond the orbit of Neptune. The team's search for trans-Neptunian objects, which began in 2001, involved routinely imaging the night sky using a charge-coupled device camera (Note: The charge-coupled device camera that discovered Makemake was the Quasar Equatorial Survey Team (QUEST) camera, which had a ~8.3 square-degree field of view with a 161-megapixel resolution. It was installed onto Palomar Observatory's Samuel Oschin telescope in 2003, when Brown and his team's search for trans-Neptunian objects was still ongoing.) attached to the 1.22-meter (48 in) Samuel Oschin telescope at Palomar Observatory in California, United States. The discovery images of Makemake were taken by this telescope on March 31, 2005, but it was not until April 3, 2005, that Brown found the object in his inspection of the images and identified it as exceptionally bright.

Several months before Makemake's discovery, Brown and his team had discovered the exceptionally large trans-Neptunian objects Haumea and Eris, which were thought to be at least the size of the then-ninth planet Pluto. As they were in the process of planning further observations for both objects, the team originally planned to delay the announcement of Makemake to sometime after Eris's planned announcement in October 2005. However, this plan was upended when a team led by José Luis Ortiz Moreno at Sierra Nevada Observatory in Spain announced their own discovery of Haumea on July 27, 2005. Brown realized that his team's observing logs containing the positions of Haumea, Eris, and Makemake were unintentionally public and had been accessed by a computer at Ortiz's institution. Fearing that his team's discoveries of Eris and Makemake would be similarly scooped, Brown contacted Brian G. Marsden of the Minor Planet Center (MPC) on July 29, 2005, to announce their discovery. The MPC issued the discovery announcements for Eris and Makemake on its website at noon California time, followed by the Central Bureau for Astronomical Telegrams later that evening. The announcement of these Pluto-sized objects prompted widespread debate over what should be considered a planet, which motivated the International Astronomical Union (IAU) to create a new definition of planet that reclassified Pluto as a dwarf planet in August 2006.

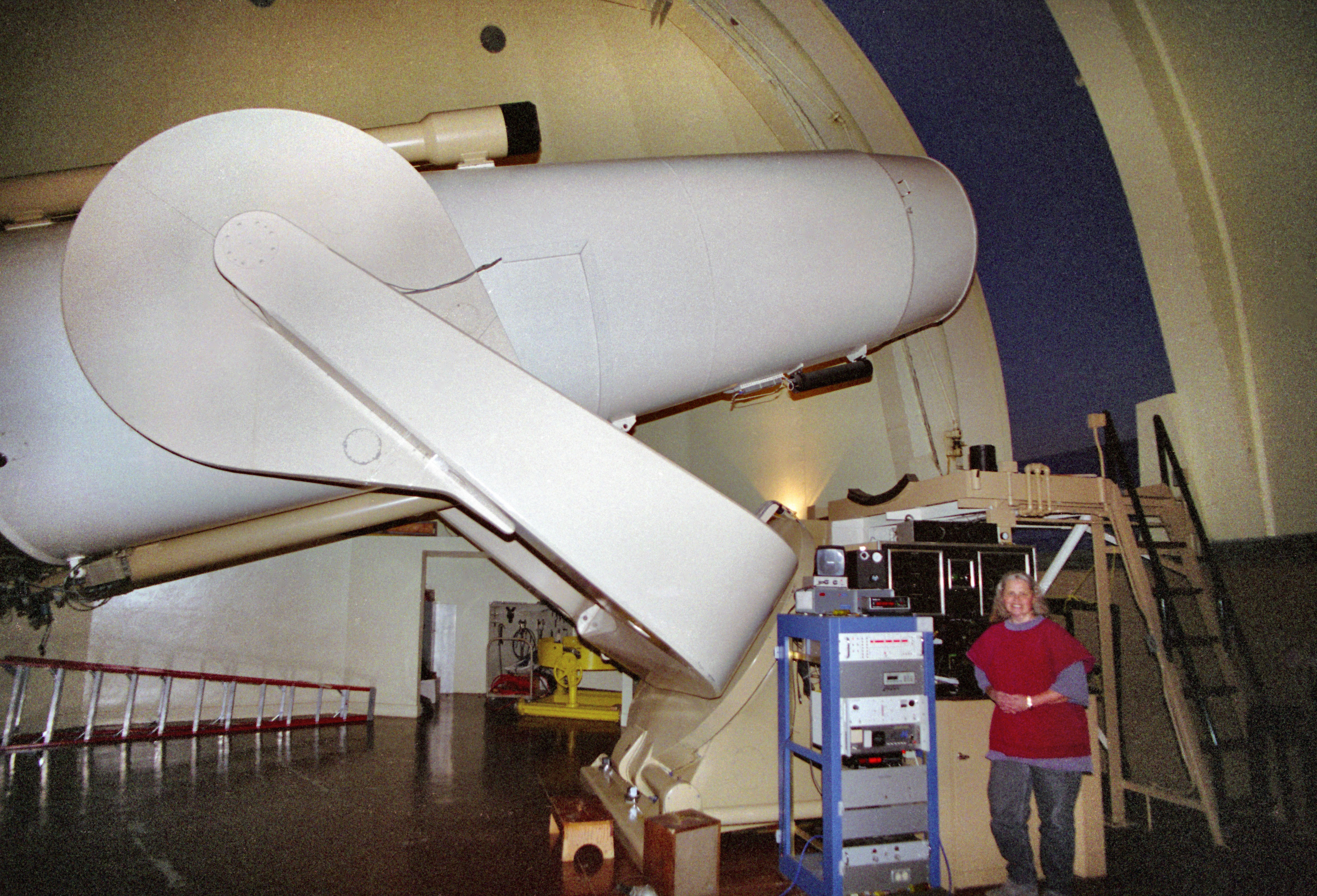
Makemake was discovered in images taken by the 1.22-meter Samuel Oschin telescope at Palomar Observatory (pictured).

=== Name and symbol ===
This dwarf planet is named after Makemake, the creator of humanity and god of fertility in the myths of the Rapa Nui people native to Easter Island. It has the minor planet catalog number of 136472, which was given by the MPC on September 7, 2005, after the object's orbit became well determined. Before Makemake was named, it was known by its provisional designation 2005 FY_{9}, which was given by the MPC when its discovery was announced. Makemake was also previously known by its nickname "Easterbunny" (Note: Science writer Govert Schilling reported that Brown initially joked about nicknaming Makemake "Dead Pope" as a reference to the then-imminent death of Pope John Paul II, but was dissuaded by his wife Diane and instead opted for the less controversial nickname "Easterbunny".) given by Brown's team as a reference to the object's time of discovery shortly after Easter, and by the codename "K05331A" which was automatically assigned by Brown's computer software when he discovered it.

In his personal writings and interviews, Brown recounted having difficulty with deciding on a formal name for the dwarf planet, because its known characteristics at the time were not relatable to mythology. Wanting to preserve the object's connection with Easter, Brown had thought about naming the object after either the Anglo-Saxon goddess Ēostre or the Anishinaabe trickster rabbit Manabozho, but found both names unusable. (Note: The name of Ēostre has already been used for the asteroid 343 Ostara, so it could not be used according to the IAU's rule against duplicate names. For the name of Manabozho, Brown personally found it unappealing because of its suffix -bozo.) Brown and his team finally settled on the name Makemake, which satisfied both the object's connection with Easter and the IAU's rule for naming classical Kuiper belt objects after creator deities. The name of Makemake was approved and announced by the IAU in July 2008. (Note: The IAU press release announcing Makemake's naming and classification as a dwarf planet was published on July 19, 2008, but other sources including New Scientist, Space Daily, and The Planetary Society have reported on this a few days earlier.)

A symbol for Makemake ⟨⟩ was introduced to Unicode in January 2022, as U+1F77C. The use of planetary symbols in scientific publications is discouraged by the IAU, so the symbol for Makemake is mostly used by astrologers. However, the symbol was used once by NASA, in an infographic published in 2015. The symbol for Makemake was designed by Denis Moskowitz and John T. Whelan; it represents a traditional petroglyph of Makemake's face, stylized to resemble the letter 'M'. Other astrologers have designed and used their own symbols for Makemake, such as ⟨⟩.

== Orbit and classification ==
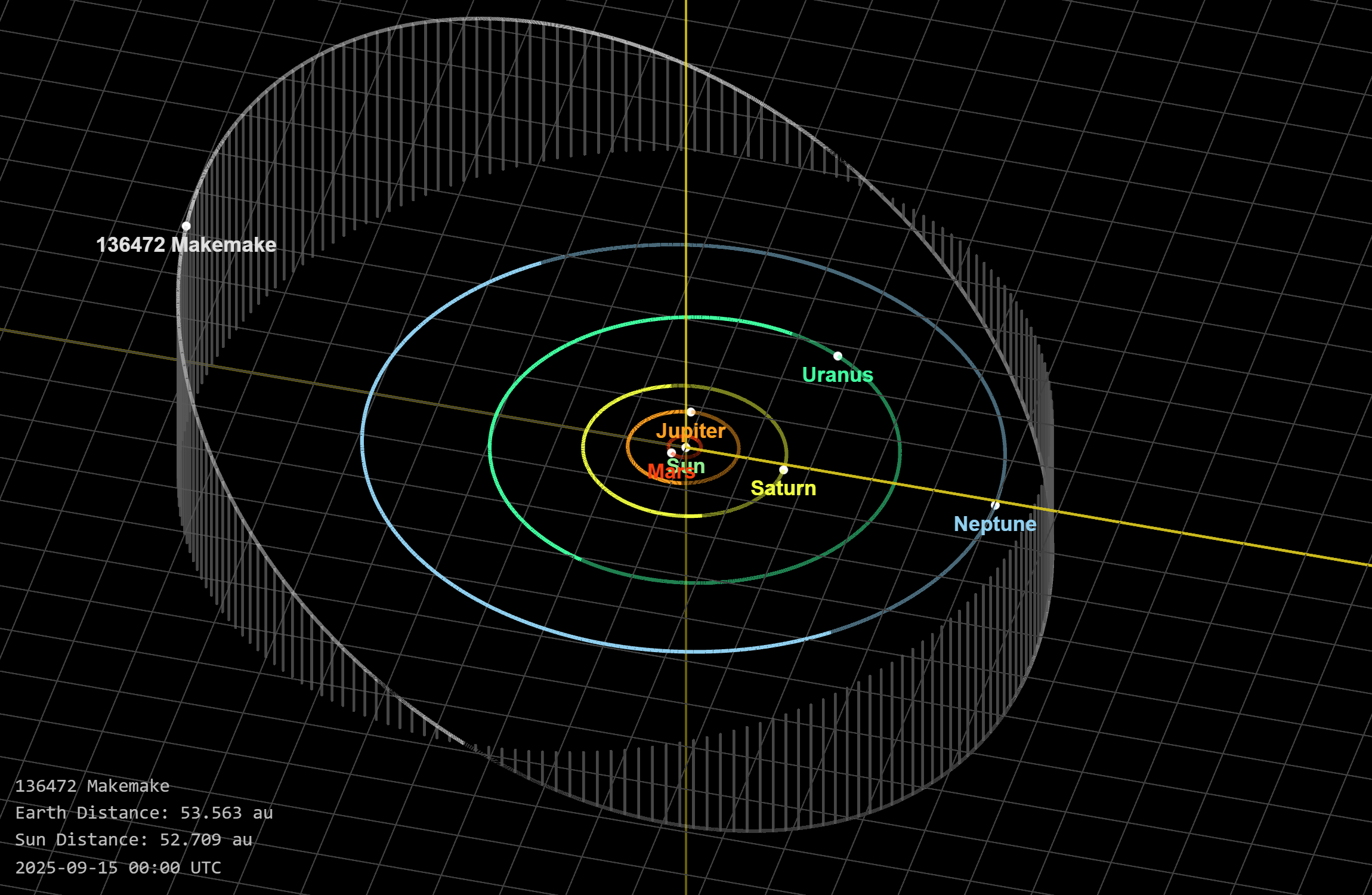
Diagram showing Makemake's inclined orbit (gray) around the Sun, with the outer planets shown. The vertical gray lines along Makemake's orbital path mark its positions above and below the ecliptic plane.

Makemake orbits the Sun beyond Neptune at an average distance of 45.5 astronomical units (AU; 6.81 billion km or 4.23 billion mi). It completes one orbit every 307 years. With an orbital eccentricity of 0.16, Makemake follows a moderately elliptical orbit that comes as close as 38.2 AU to the Sun (perihelion) to as far as 52.8 AU from the Sun (aphelion). Makemake has a relatively high orbital inclination of 29° with respect to the ecliptic.

Makemake is currently near aphelion, the farthest point of its orbit. It is 52.7 AU away from the Sun as of November 2025, and will reach aphelion in May 2033. Makemake is currently positioned far above the ecliptic and will remain so at aphelion, where its ecliptic latitude will be 25.9°. Makemake will cross the ecliptic in 2103 and will come to perihelion –26° below the ecliptic in 2186. N-body simulations show that Makemake's orbit is stable on a scale of billions of years and is unlikely to change significantly over the remaining life of the Solar System.

Makemake shares its orbital characteristics with many other small icy bodies beyond Neptune, which together belong to a region known as the Kuiper belt. Makemake specifically belongs to the "dynamically hot" population of classical Kuiper belt objects, (Note: "Hot" in this case does not indicate temperature (Makemake is very frigid), but the dynamics of its orbit, which has been highly perturbed.) whose orbits have high inclinations (i > 5°), relatively low eccentricities (e < 0.2), and are not in orbital resonance with Neptune. Makemake is the largest member of the classical Kuiper belt, although it only constitutes a small fraction of the total mass of the belt. (Note: Jean-Marc Petit et al. (2023) estimate that the total mass of the hot classical Kuiper belt is 0.012 Earth masses (≈7.17×10^{22} kg). Given Makemake's mass of 2.69×10^{21} kg, it is believed to constitute roughly 3.8% of the hot classical Kuiper belt's total mass.) The hot classical Kuiper belt objects are believed to have been gravitationally scattered by Neptune in the Solar System's early history, hence astronomers have also termed Makemake a "scattered" object.

The scientific consensus is that Makemake is a dwarf planet: that is, that it is massive enough for its own gravity to make its shape spherical, but not massive enough to clear other objects away from its orbit, as demonstrated by its location in the Kuiper belt. It was the first object named by the IAU under new procedures for naming objects expected to be dwarf planets, and the fourth object announced as a dwarf planet (after the original Ceres, Pluto, and Eris) since that category had been established in 2006. Makemake is more specifically a plutoid: the subcategory of dwarf planets that orbit beyond Neptune.

== Size, shape, and mass ==
Comparison of sizes, albedos, and colors of various large trans-Neptunian objects with diameters greater than 700 km (430 mi). Makemake is shown on the top row, second from the right. The light and dark colored arcs represent uncertainties of the object's size.

Makemake is a nearly spherical object with an average diameter of around 1,430 km (890 mi), which is about 60% (3/5) the diameter of Pluto (Note: Pluto has a diameter of 2376 km.) or 11% (1/9) the diameter of Earth. This makes Makemake the fourth-largest known dwarf planet and trans-Neptunian object in the Solar System, after Pluto, Eris, and Haumea. Observations of a stellar occultation in 2011 showed that Makemake is slightly oblate or flattened at its poles, with an upper limit in its polar diameter of around 1,420 km (880 mi) (Note: The exact flattening and tilt of Makemake's poles with respect to Earth's line of sight is not known, so the apparent polar diameter of 1420+18 −24 km from the 2011 occultation only represents an upper limit to Makemake's true polar diameter. This is because in a stellar occultation, only the occulting object's shadow is seen.) and an equatorial diameter of around 1,434 km (891 mi). These dimensions are consistent with Makemake having a flattened spherical shape known as a Maclaurin spheroid, which occurs when an object is in hydrostatic equilibrium (that is, the object's gravity is strong enough to compress it into a sphere) and is deformed by its rotation.

Makemake has a mass of between approximately 2.5×10^{21} and 2.9×10^{21} kg, a number determined from the orbital period and distance of its moon. This makes Makemake the fourth-most massive known dwarf planet and trans-Neptunian object in the Solar System, again after Eris, Pluto, and Haumea. Compared to other Solar System objects, Makemake is about 3.7% the mass of Earth's moon (or 0.045% the mass of Earth) (Note: Earth has a mass of 5.9722×10^{24} kg and its moon has a mass of 7.346×10^{22} kg) and around 20% the mass of Pluto. (Note: Pluto has a mass of 1.303×10^{22} kg.) Given Makemake's mass and average diameter, its average surface gravity is about 0.35 m/s^{2} (about 3.6% Earth gravity) (Note: The standard surface gravity of Earth is approximately g_{0} = 9.81 m/s^{2}.) and its surface escape velocity is about 0.71 km/s.

== Rotation ==
The rotation period of Makemake is uncertain, with measurements giving either 11.4 or 22.8 hours (0.48 or 0.95 d) as of 2025. These rotation period measurements were made by monitoring changes in Makemake's brightness over time, which is plotted as a light curve. Makemake exhibits very little variation in brightness (0.03 magnitudes) presumably due to small albedo variations across its surface, which makes it difficult for telescopes to measure Makemake's light curve and rotation period. For example, studies prior to 2019 suggested possible rotation periods of 7.77, 11.24, 11.5, and 22.48 hours. For measurements as of 2025, it is unclear whether Makemake's brightness peaks once or twice per rotation, so it is unclear whether the rotation period is 11.4 hours or double that value at 22.8 hours.

The axial tilt of Makemake has not been measured, although it can be reasonably assumed that its rotation axis is aligned with the pole of its moon's orbit. In that case, Makemake would have a high axial tilt somewhere between 46° and 78° with respect to its orbit around the Sun (or 63°–87° with respect to the ecliptic), with its equator facing toward the Sun and Earth (near equinox) at the time its moon was discovered. This high axial tilt together with its eccentric orbit can give rise to major seasonal changes in Makemake's surface temperature and terrain, similar to those seen on Pluto. Makemake's moon was predicted to eclipse Makemake sometime during 2009–2013 or 2023–2027, so Makemake may have passed equinox during either of those year ranges if its rotation is aligned with its moon's orbit.

== Geology ==
=== Surface composition and color ===
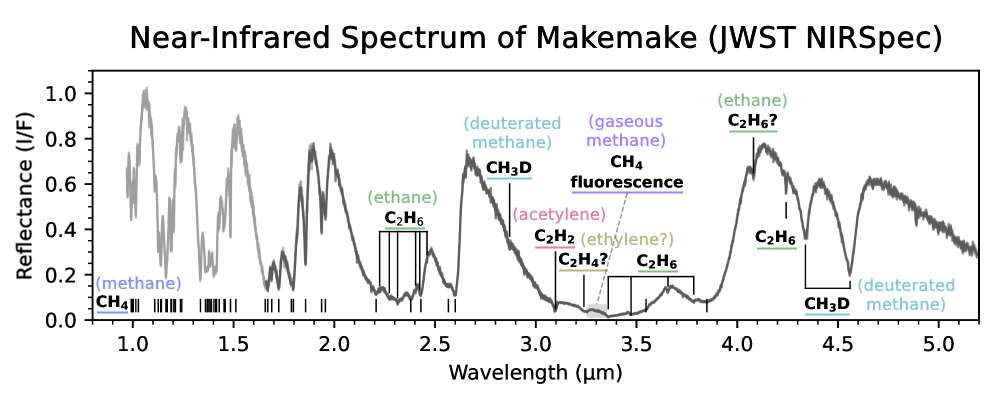
The near-infrared spectrum of Makemake, as measured by the James Webb Space Telescope. The absorption signatures of methane (CH_{4}) at 1–2 μm are very prominent in Makemake's spectrum, which indicates it is very abundant on Makemake's surface. Other chemical compounds detected on Makemake include ethane (C_{2}H_{6}), acetylene (C_{2}H_{2}), deuterated methane (CH_{3}D), and possibly ethylene (C_{2}H_{4}).

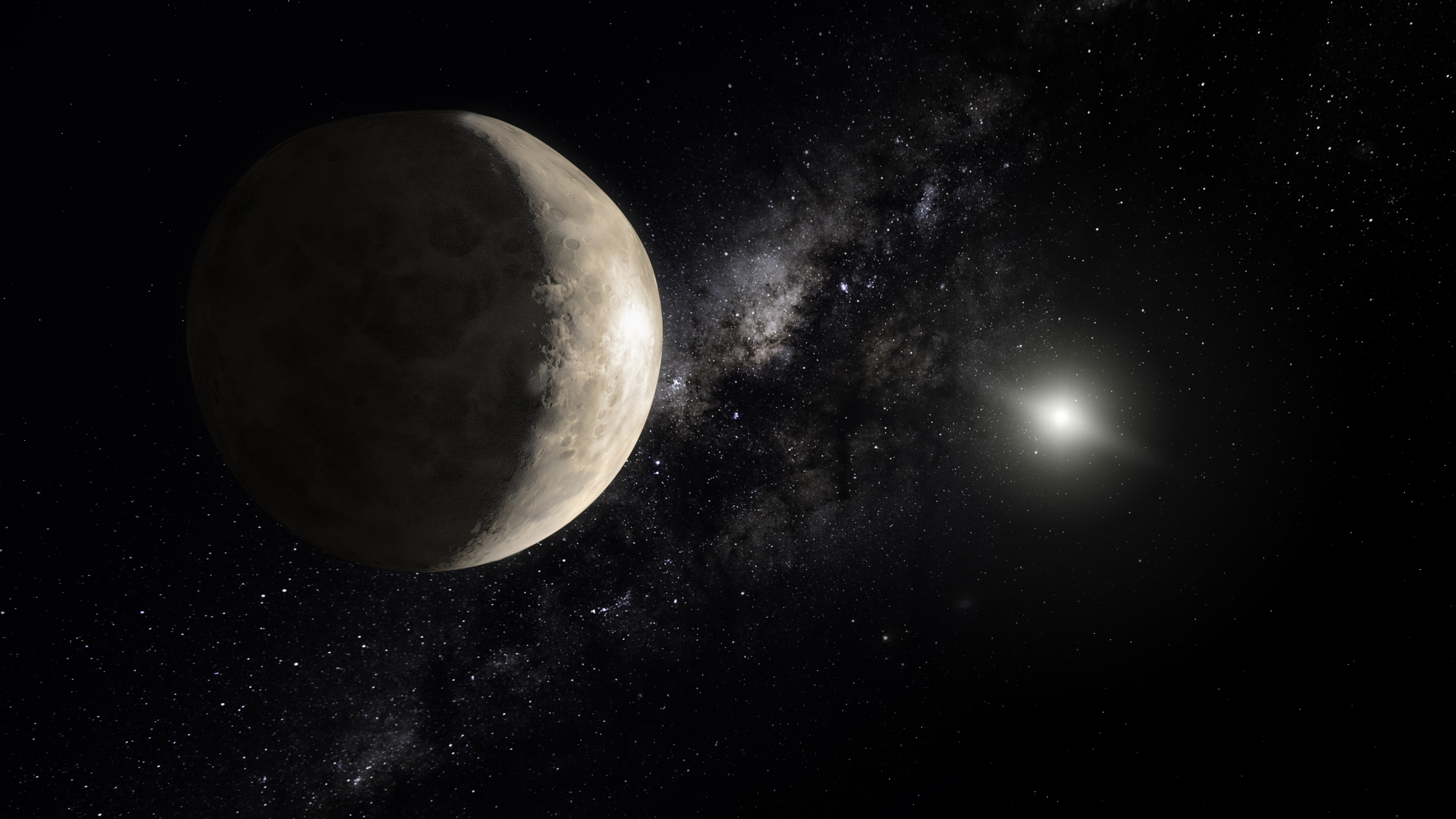
An artistic illustration of Makemake depicting its uniform, light brown surface and lack of a substantial atmosphere

Because of its great distance from the Sun, Makemake's surface has an extremely low temperature of 30 to 40 K (−243 to −233 °C; −406 to −388 °F)—cold enough that some volatile substances like methane can exist as solid ice. Astronomical spectroscopy has shown that the surface of Makemake is dominated by frozen methane, with smaller amounts of long-chain hydrocarbons including ethane, ethylene, acetylene, and various high-mass alkanes like propane.

In visible light, the surface of Makemake appears very bright and reflective with a geometric albedo of 82% (more reflective than Pluto), suggesting that its methane is freshly deposited. Makemake's methane ice is highly absorbent in near-infrared, which indicates that it either exists in the form of unusually large, centimeter-sized pellets, or more likely, thick slabs of sintered particles. Meanwhile, phase curve measurements by the New Horizons spacecraft suggest that the regolith on Makemake's surface consists of smooth grains resembling snow.

The long-chain hydrocarbons on Makemake's surface come from the irradiation of methane by ultraviolet sunlight and cosmic rays, which break down the methane and trigger photochemical reactions. These photochemical reactions can cascade: transforming methane into ethane, into ethylene, into acetylene, and so on until it leaves a dark, reddish mixture of complex hydrocarbons, called tholins. These tholins give Makemake a reddish-brownish color, similar to what has been seen on Pluto. Makemake is less red than Pluto, but is somewhat redder than Eris; the difference in color may be due to differing concentrations of tholins on these dwarf planets. Although tholins should darken the surface of Makemake, the dwarf planet remains bright because fresh methane ice covers up its tholins.

Makemake shares its high abundance of methane ice with Pluto and Eris, but unlike those two, Makemake apparently lacks both carbon monoxide and nitrogen ices. The James Webb Space Telescope (JWST) could not find these two ices in Makemake's surface, indicating that it contains less than 3% nitrogen and less than 1 part per million of carbon monoxide. Without nitrogen and carbon monoxide to mix with, methane ice on Makemake remains pure and can grow to large thicknesses or grain sizes. Makemake's lack of nitrogen is expected, because nitrogen is highly volatile and its vapor can escape from Makemake's gravity more easily than from the stronger gravities of Pluto and Eris. The reason for Makemake's apparent lack of carbon monoxide is less clear: it could have been removed via either atmospheric escape or hydrothermally-driven geochemical reactions inside Makemake, or Makemake could have somehow formed with low amounts of carbon monoxide. Water and carbon dioxide ices are also apparently absent in Makemake's surface, even though they are common refractory (non-volatile) materials in Kuiper belt objects; this may be because on Makemake, these ices are completely covered by volatile material like methane and its irradiation products.

=== Geography ===
Makemake appears to have a uniform surface with only minor variations in albedo, color, and composition across its longitudes. This contrasts with the highly mottled surface of Pluto. Whether Makemake exhibits significant latitudinal variations remains unknown, as these can only be detected by observing the dwarf planet from different viewing angles (aspect angles (Note: The aspect angle of a Solar System object is defined as the angle between the object's rotation axis and Earth's line of sight to the object.)) as it progresses through its orbit around the Sun. Because Makemake orbits slowly, such observations require many years. Between 2006 and 2017, Makemake's aspect angle changed by about 11°, yet no corresponding changes were observed in its absolute magnitude or light curve. If latitudinal variations do exist, they would likely resemble bands running parallel across Makemake's equator.

Planetary scientists William M. Grundy, Alex H. Parker, and colleagues have hypothesized that Makemake's abundant volatile methane may lead to similar geography and geology as Pluto. If Makemake has seasonal volatile transport processes like Pluto, it could potentially produce a longitudinally uniform band of dark material, akin to Pluto's Belton Regio. Alternatively, if Makemake has a non-global atmosphere that froze onto its surface, its equator could be bright and frost-covered, whereas its poles could be darker. Seasonal sublimation and deposition of methane could potentially produce bladed terrain or even thick, convecting glaciers resembling Pluto's Sputnik Planitia. Makemake is not expected to have mountains taller than 10 km (6.2 mi).

=== Interior and possible geological activity ===
Makemake has a bulk density of about 1.76 g/cm^{3} (with an uncertainty of ±0.17 g/cm^{3}), similar to the trans-Neptunian dwarf planets Pluto, Gonggong, and Quaoar. Like for these dwarf planets, this density suggests that Makemake has an interior mostly made of water ice and rock. Makemake is large enough that its interior is likely differentiated, having a rocky core surrounded by layers of ice. Planetary scientists suspect that Makemake's interior contains enough radionuclides and primordial heat to sustain a subsurface liquid water ocean, in the past or potentially even today. A high amount of heat inside Makemake could give rise to geological phenomena such as cryovolcanism.

Spectroscopy by the JWST has detected heavy isotopologues of methane containing deuterium (D or ^{2}H) and carbon-13 (^{13}C) in Makemake's surface, for which astronomers have determined a deuterium-to-hydrogen (D/H) ratio of (2.9±0.6)×10^{−4} and a ^{13}C/^{12}C ratio of 0.010±0.003. While Makemake's ^{13}C/^{12}C ratio matches those of other Solar System objects, Makemake's D/H ratio is different: it is much lower than the D/H ratios of methane in comets, but is similar to the D/H ratios of water in comets. Planetary scientists have interpreted Makemake's low D/H ratio as evidence for Makemake having a warm interior with active hydrothermal geochemistry: Makemake's deuterium-poor methane may have inherited its hydrogen from geochemical reactions in subsurface water, which require high temperatures of 150 °C (302 °F) that could only be sustained by heat from Makemake's core. In this scenario, Makemake's subsurface water may either exist in the form of liquid water or convecting solid ice, and internally-produced methane may have been transported to Makemake's surface via outgassing or cryovolcanic eruptions. However, it is still possible that Makemake's deuterium-poor methane may be primordial (originating directly from the protosolar nebula via accretion), so internal geochemical activity may not be necessary to explain its existence.

Makemake emits an unusually high amount of mid-infrared radiation compared to far-infrared, which has received various interpretations by astronomers since its first reported detection by the Spitzer Space Telescope in 2008. Astronomers initially thought that Makemake's excess mid-infrared emission came from patches of dark, warm terrain mixed with bright, cold terrain (and also from its moon after it was discovered), but this hypothesis could not accurately describe Makemake's infrared emission at different wavelengths, nor could it explain Makemake's minuscule brightness variability.

In 2025, Csaba Kiss and collaborators proposed that Makemake's excess mid-infrared emission could instead be caused by either a cryovolcanic hotspot reaching temperatures of about 150 K (−123 °C; −190 °F), or an orbiting ring consisting of tiny carbonaceous dust grains. The cryovolcanic hotspot scenario is favored because the aforementioned dust ring would quickly destabilize due to solar radiation pressure, although the ring could potentially be replenished if cryovolcanic eruptions are able to eject carbonaceous dust into orbit around Makemake. The proposed cryovolcanic hotspot may be emitting a similar amount of heat energy as the south pole geysers of Saturn's moon Enceladus, and it could potentially erupt cryolava containing ammonia and various salts dissolved in liquid water. The location of this cryovolcanic hotspot on Makemake's surface is unknown, though it is estimated to cover an area of about 350 km^{2} (140 mi^{2}; equivalent to a ~10 km or 6.2 mi-radius circle).

== Atmosphere or outgassing ==
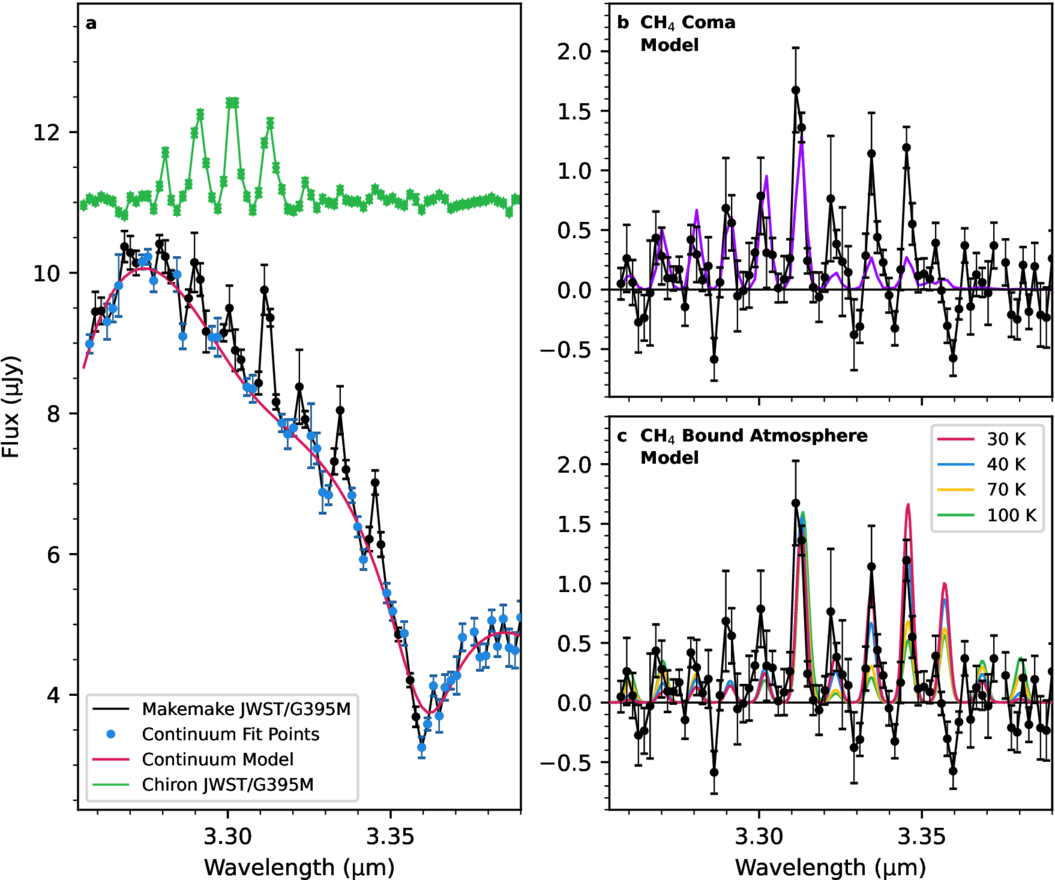
JWST detection of gaseous methane (CH_{4}) fluorescence in Makemake's near-infrared spectrum (left panel, labeled a). Either an outgassing methane coma (b) or a thin methane atmosphere (c) can explain the observed fluorescence.

Analysis of JWST spectroscopy in 2025 revealed the presence of gaseous methane on Makemake, which fluoresces in near-infrared due to sunlight absorption. Makemake is the second trans-Neptunian object confirmed to have gas, after Pluto. However, it is uncertain whether Makemake's methane gas is contained in a gravitationally bound atmosphere, or is temporarily outgassing (if not escaping) from its surface due to methane ice sublimation or cryovolcanic plumes. Makemake is barely massive and cold enough to theoretically hold onto an atmosphere of methane or nitrogen; JWST observations have shown that Makemake does not appear to have nitrogen gas, which indicates most of it had already been lost to atmospheric escape.

If Makemake's detected methane gas is entirely contained in a gravitationally bound atmosphere, then the surface atmospheric pressure would be roughly 10 picobars (1 micropascal), which is 100 billion times less than Earth's atmospheric pressure and 1 million times less than Pluto's. Such an extremely thin atmosphere was not detected in observations of Makemake's 2011 stellar occultation, which supports the occultation finding that Makemake lacks a substantial global atmosphere greater than 4–12 nanobars (0.4–1.2 millipascals). The temperature of this putative thin atmosphere would be about 40 K (−233.2 °C; −387.7 °F), which is slightly above the sublimation temperature of methane at this atmosphere's surface pressure. This raises the possibility that Makemake's putative atmosphere may be sustained by the sublimation of surface methane ice. As Makemake follows an eccentric orbit, its putative atmosphere may change with distance from the Sun: for example, in the warmer temperatures of perihelion, Makemake may sublimate more methane but may lose some to atmospheric escape.

Alternatively, if the methane gas detected by JWST is coming from outgassing only, then it would suggest that Makemake is releasing roughly 266 kg (586 lb) of methane per second from 4–30% of its entire surface area. It is unknown if the methane is being outgassed at speeds fast enough to escape Makemake's gravity. If methane gas is escaping, it would form a comet-like coma surrounding Makemake. The estimated mass loss rate would be comparable to that of Enceladus's water plumes (300 kg/s or 660 lb/s) and the limited surface area of methane emission could potentially be related to Makemake's proposed cryovolcanic hotspot. Cryovolcanic outgassing of methane has been hypothesized to be ubiquitous among trans-Neptunian dwarf planets like Makemake.

== Satellites and potential rings ==
=== S/2015 (136472) 1 ===
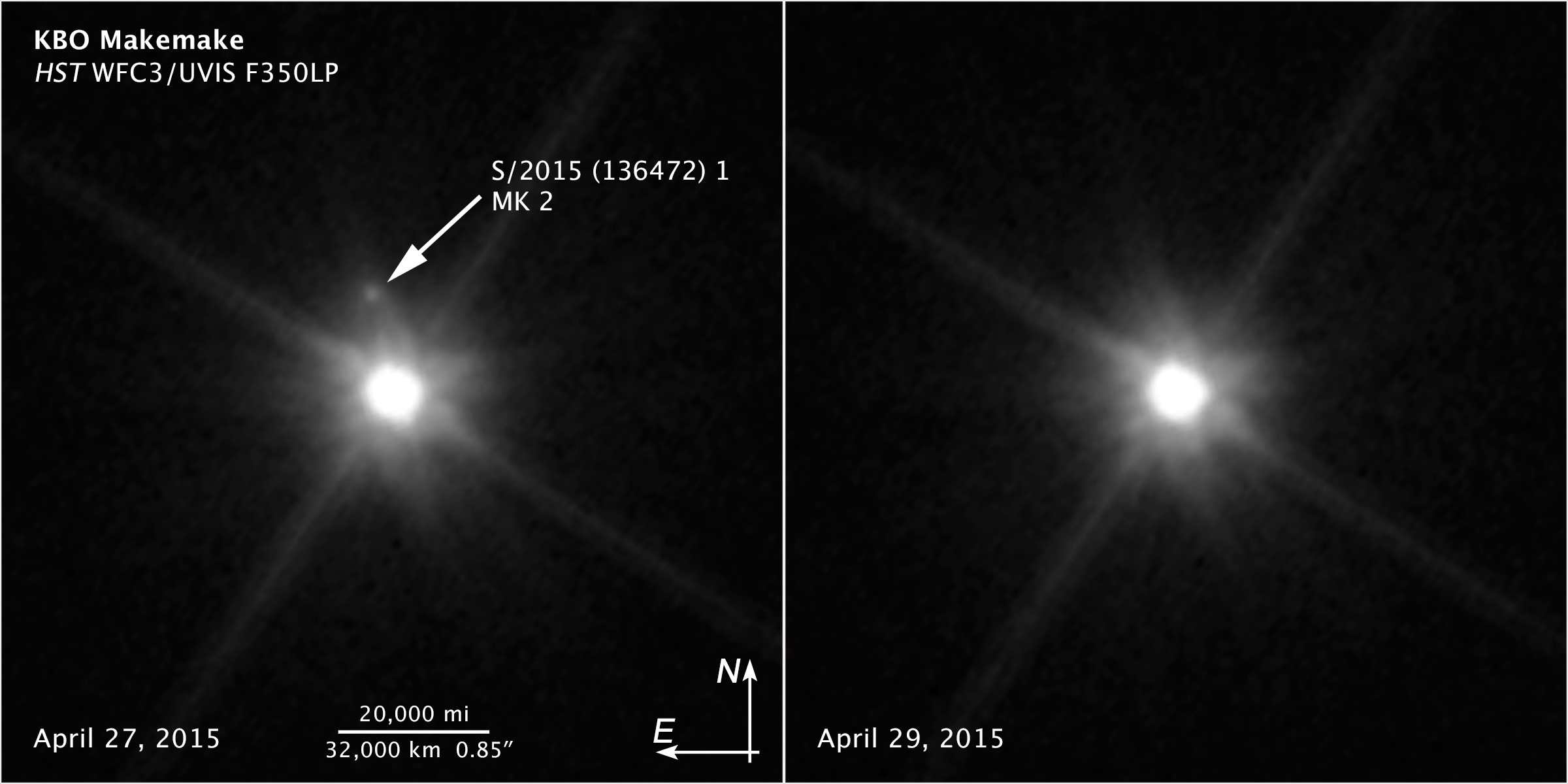
Discovery images of Makemake's moon by the Hubble Space Telescope from April 2015. The moon was visible on April 27, but had moved and become hidden by April 29.

Timelapse of S/2015 (136472) 1 orbiting Makemake, as seen by Hubble during 2018–2019. Makemake appears smudged because its glare has been digitally removed to make the moon more visible.

Makemake has only one known natural satellite or moon, which is unnamed with the provisional designation S/2015 (136472) 1 and unofficial nickname "MK 2". It was discovered by astronomers Alex H. Parker, Marc W. Buie, William M. Grundy, and Keith S. Noll in Hubble Space Telescope images taken on April 27, 2015, and was announced on April 26, 2016. S/2015 (136472) 1 is about 1,300 times (7.8 magnitudes) fainter than Makemake in visible light and is suspected to have a very dark surface with a diameter of 175 km (109 mi) in order to explain some of Makemake's excess mid-infrared radiation. The moon follows a likely circular orbit around Makemake with an orbital period of 18 days and a semi-major axis of 22,250 ± 780 km (13,830 ± 480 mi).

When S/2015 (136472) 1 was discovered, its orbit was oriented nearly edge-on from the point of view of Earth-based observatories, which meant that the moon appeared to pass in front of or behind Makemake. Although this edge-on configuration made it difficult for telescopes to image S/2015 (136472) 1, it may have allowed the moon to eclipse and occult Makemake. It is predicted that the moon may have eclipsed Makemake during 2009–2013, or may be still eclipsing Makemake during 2023–2027. No eclipses by S/2015 (136472) 1 have been reported as of 2025.

Makemake system
Name	Diameter (km)	Semi-major axis (km)	Discovery date
Makemake	1430±14		March 31, 2005
S/2015 (136472) 1	≈ 175	22250±780	April 27, 2015

=== Possibility of other satellites ===
Imaging observations by the Hubble Space Telescope indicate Makemake does not have additional moons brighter than apparent magnitude 26.9 (~10 magnitudes fainter than Makemake) (Note: The size of an object with a known brightness depends on its albedo. If a satellite 10 magnitudes fainter than Makemake has an albedo of 0.7, its diameter would be roughly 16 km (9.9 mi). A smaller albedo would correspond to a larger diameter.) at distances beyond 30,000 km (19,000 mi). Larger moons could be hidden from the view of telescopes if they orbited very close to Makemake. The possibility of Makemake having an additional dark moon larger than S/2015 (136472) 1 has been discussed by astronomers as a potential solution for Makemake's excess mid-infrared emission and apparently slow rotation, but it was disfavored because it required an unrealistically large moon size.

=== Possibility of rings ===
Makemake does not have any known rings. Rings around distant objects are too small and faint to be directly imaged by telescopes, so they would ideally be detected in observations of stellar occultations. However, rings were not detected in Makemake's stellar occultation from 2011. If rings do exist around Makemake, they would likely orbit around its equator in an edge-on configuration like S/2015 (136472) 1, which could have made them missable to astronomers during the 2011 occultation. The possibility of a ring around Makemake has been explored as a potential solution to Makemake's excess mid-infrared emission, but it was deemed unlikely because the hypothesis would require the ring to be made of extremely small (~100 nm) dust particles, which would make it vulnerable to destruction by solar radiation pressure within a decade. Nevertheless, it might be possible for Makemake to sustain such a ring if it has shepherd moons, a continuous production of dust from colliding particles and small moons, or cryovolcanic eruptions ejecting dust into orbit.

== Origin ==
Like other dwarf planets in the Kuiper belt, Makemake is believed to have formed early in the Solar System's history, about 4.5 billion years ago. The dwarf planets in the Kuiper belt are hypothesized to have begun as small planetesimals, which grew to their present-day sizes by accreting surrounding material and other planetesimals over a few million years. The temperature of Makemake's formation environment must have been cold enough for volatiles such as methane to condense into solids and subsequently accrete into the dwarf planet. However, Makemake may have lost some of its primordial methane during accretion because it initially had a smaller mass and a warmer temperature due to frequent impact events and greater solar irradiance. It has also been hypothesized that at some point in Makemake's past, a massive collision with another body may have formed its moon S/2015 (136472) 1.

According to a 2020 hypothesis based on Solar System formation models (an update of the Nice model from 2005 that first proposed a similar scenario), a few tens of millions of years after the Solar System's formation, gravitational interactions among the giant planets caused Neptune to abruptly migrate outward into a massive circumstellar disk between 15 and 30 AU from the Sun, gravitationally scattering many of the objects within it. The model indicates that nearly all Kuiper belt objects including Makemake originally formed closer to the Sun than where they are now, in that circumstellar disk. The scattering of this disk is thought to have produced the present-day resonant and "hot" classical populations of the Kuiper belt (where Makemake now resides) as well as the scattered disk.

== Observation and exploration ==
=== Observation ===
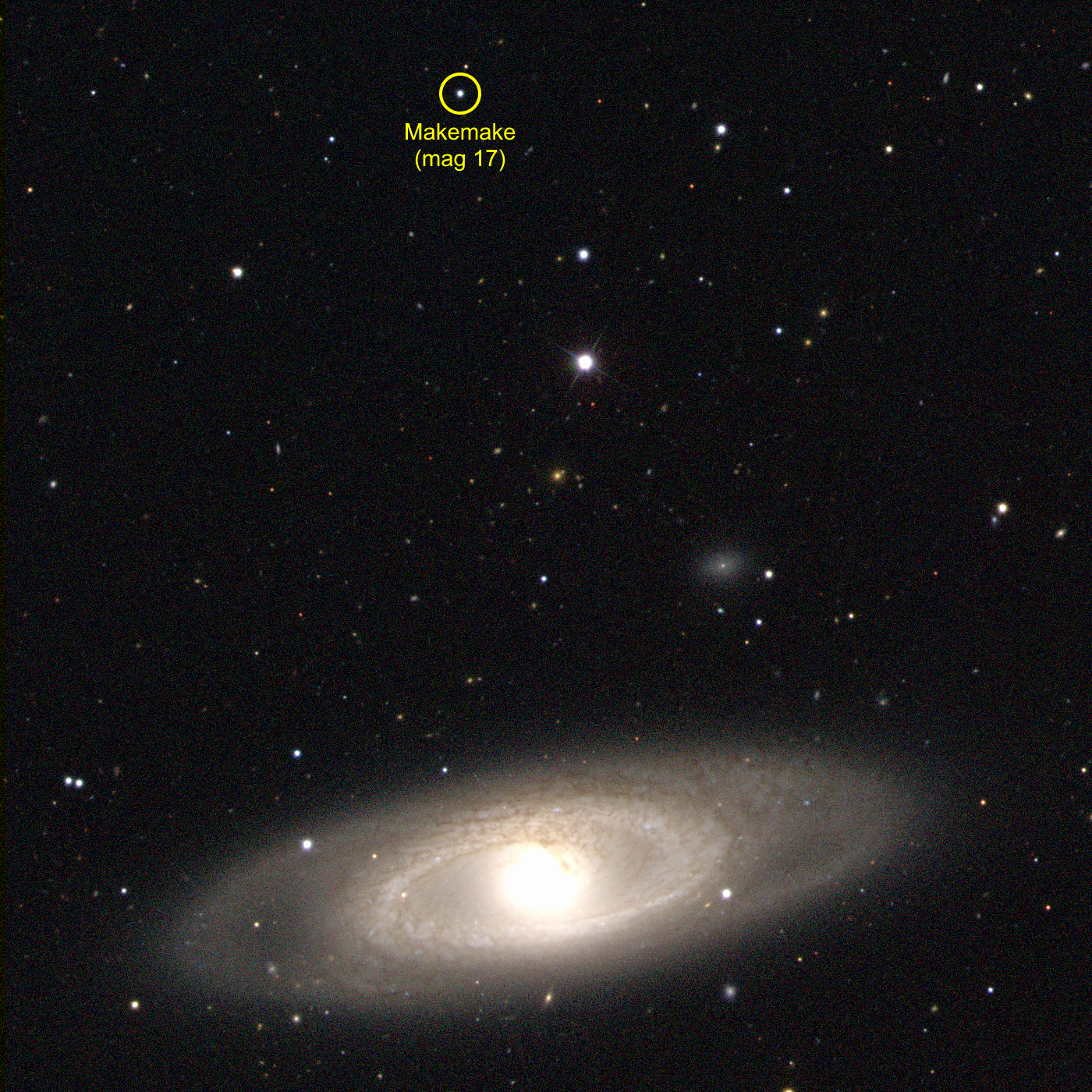
Sloan Digital Sky Survey precovery image of Makemake (circled) above the large galaxy NGC 4274 on December 13, 2004

In terms of visual absolute magnitude, Makemake is the third intrinsically brightest known trans-Neptunian object, after Eris and Pluto. Makemake owes its high intrinsic brightness to its large size and highly reflective surface. (Note: The absolute magnitude (H) of a Solar System body is calculated according to the equation $H = -5\log_{10}{\left( \frac{D \sqrt{p} }{1329 \mathrm{km}} \right)}$, which is rearranged from the original absolute magnitude and albedo (p) to diameter (D) equation $D = \frac{1329 \mathrm{km}}{\sqrt{p}} \times 10^{-0.2H}$ given by Harris & Harris (1997). In the absolute magnitude equation, larger values for both diameter D and albedo p give a smaller (and thus brighter) value for H. Brown alludes to this relationship in his webpage describing the discovery of Eris, where he mentions that a dwarf planet can appear bright if it is either large, highly reflective, or both. Makemake is both large and highly reflective.) In terms of visual apparent magnitude, on the other hand, Makemake is the second brightest trans-Neptunian object in the sky after Pluto, owing to its closer distance to the Sun than Eris. Makemake reaches a peak brightness of about apparent magnitude 17 when it comes to opposition during March to April, which is bright enough to be visible using a high-end amateur telescope. Because Makemake is very far from Earth, it appears very small with an angular diameter of about 38 milliarcseconds, so telescopes cannot resolve it beyond a star-like point of light. In the sky, Makemake is located in the northern constellation Coma Berenices and has been there since its discovery. In late 2028, Makemake will move to the constellation Boötes.

Despite being one of the brightest trans-Neptunian objects, Makemake was discovered relatively late—well after the discoveries of many fainter trans-Neptunian objects. This is because Makemake follows a highly inclined orbit that brings it far outside the ecliptic—outside where previous sky surveys had mainly been searching. Although various sky surveys have serendipitously detected Makemake several years before its discovery, these observations (known as precoveries) were not recognized until after the fact. (Note: Precoveries from Kleť, Palomar, and Haleakala observatories were reported to the Minor Planet Center a few months after Makemake's announcement in 2005, while precoveries from the Sloan Digital Sky Survey were reported much later in 2015.) The earliest known precovery of Makemake comes from a photographic plate taken at Palomar Observatory on January 29, 1955, which predates Makemake's discovery by just over 50 years (16% of Makemake's orbital period).

While moving across the sky, Makemake may pass in front of a background star and briefly block out its light from Earth's point of view, resulting in a stellar occultation. Stellar occultations by Makemake can reveal details such as its shape and potential atmosphere, but are difficult to accurately predict because the dwarf planet's great distance from Earth makes it subject to large uncertainties in its position. Stellar occultations by Makemake are rare because the dwarf planet is located in a region of the sky with relatively few stars. As of 2025, only one stellar occultation by Makemake has been successfully predicted and detected by astronomers. The first and only observed stellar occultation by Makemake took place on April 23, 2011, which yielded 7 positive detections out of 16 participating telescopes located at sites scattered across South America.

=== Exploration ===
Makemake (indicated with red bars) imaged by the New Horizons spacecraft on October 6, 2007

Makemake has not been visited up close by a space probe, although astronomers and planetary scientists have expressed desire to send one there. Makemake has been recognized as an attractive exploration target because it potentially hosts a subsurface ocean with ongoing geological activity. The exploration of a trans-Neptunian object like Makemake would provide insights to the formation and evolution of the Solar System.

A 2011 study by Ryan McGranaghan and colleagues calculated that a flyby mission to Makemake could take just over 16 years using a Jupiter gravity assist, based on a launch date of August 24, 2036. Makemake would be approximately 52.3 AU from the Sun when the spacecraft arrives. A 2024 study by the University of Tennessee suggested that if a flyby mission to Makemake made use of a powered Jupiter gravity assist, it could reach Makemake within a shorter time duration of 9.6–16.4 years, depending on the spacecraft's payload mass. A powered Jupiter gravity assist would be most optimal for launch dates of August 22, 2036 and September 27, 2048.

A 2019 study by Amanda Zangari and collaborators identified several possible flyby trajectories to Makemake for different gravity assists and excess launch energies. For launch dates in 2036–2039, a single Jupiter gravity assist could bring a spacecraft to Makemake in 12.8–23.6 or 11.6–19.2 years, respectively. A single Saturn gravity assist may provide a faster route for lower-energy launches: for launch dates in 2032–2033 or 2036–2040, a spacecraft could reach Makemake in 19.2–22.5 or 12.8–19.1 years, respectively. For launch dates in 2037–2049, a spacecraft could reach Makemake in 16.8–17.3 years using gravity assists from both Jupiter and Saturn.

Makemake was observed from afar by the New Horizons spacecraft in October 2007 and January 2017, from distances of 52 AU and 70 AU, respectively. The spacecraft's outbound trajectory through the Kuiper belt permitted observations of Makemake at high phase angles that are otherwise unobtainable from Earth, which enabled the determination of the light scattering properties and phase curve behavior of Makemake's surface.

== See also ==
- Astronomical naming conventions
- List of Solar System objects by size
- How I Killed Pluto and Why It Had It Coming
- Ocean worlds
- Extraterrestrial liquid water
- (612533) 2002 XV93, the first non-dwarf planet TNO discovered with an atmosphere
