= Hydrostatic equilibrium =

State of balance between external forces on a fluid and internal pressure gradient

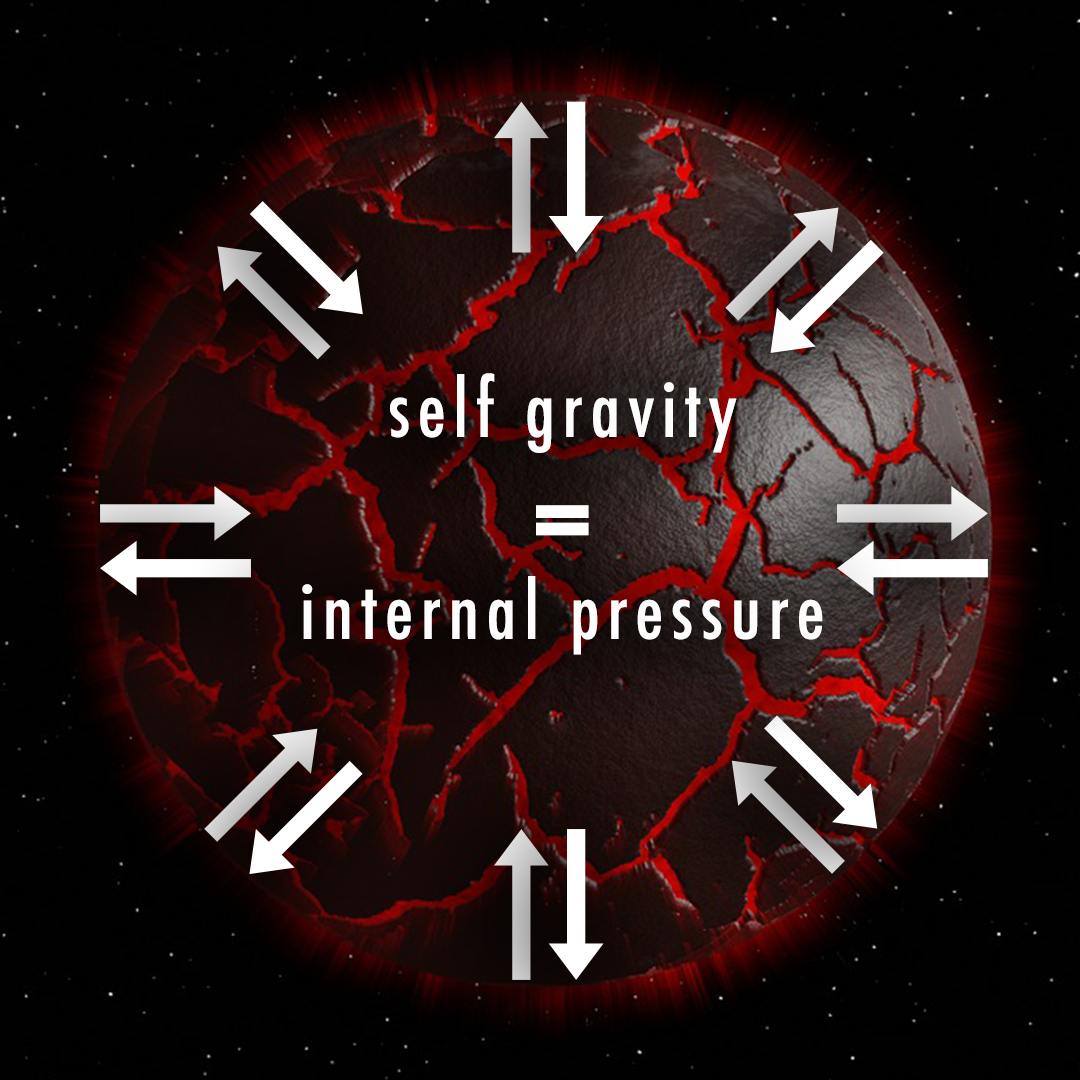
Diagram of a newly formed planet in a state of hydrostatic equilibrium

In fluid mechanics, hydrostatic equilibrium, also called hydrostatic balance and hydrostasy, is the condition of a fluid or plastic solid at rest, which occurs when external forces, such as gravity, are balanced by a pressure-gradient force. In the planetary physics of Earth, the pressure-gradient force prevents gravity from collapsing the atmosphere of Earth into a thin, dense shell, whereas gravity prevents the pressure-gradient force from diffusing the atmosphere into outer space. In general, it is what causes objects in space to be spherical.

Hydrostatic equilibrium is the distinguishing criterion between dwarf planets and small solar system bodies, and features in astrophysics and planetary geology. Said qualification of equilibrium indicates that the shape of the object is symmetrically rounded, mostly by rotation, into an ellipsoid, where any irregular surface features are consequent to a relatively thin solid crust. In addition to the Sun, there are a dozen or so equilibrium objects confirmed to exist in the Solar System.

== Mathematical consideration ==
If the highlighted volume of fluid is not accelerating, the forces on it upwards must equal the forces downwards.

For a hydrostatic fluid on Earth:
$$dP = - \rho(P) \, g(h) \, dh$$

=== Derivation from force summation ===
Newton's laws of motion state that a volume of a fluid that is not in motion or that is in a state of constant velocity must have zero net force on it. This means the sum of the forces in a given direction must be opposed by an equal sum of forces in the opposite direction. This force balance is called a hydrostatic equilibrium.

The fluid can be split into a large number of cuboid volume elements; by considering a single element, the action of the fluid can be derived.

There are three forces: the force downwards onto the top of the cuboid from the pressure, P, of the fluid above it is, from the definition of pressure,
$$F_\text{top} = - P_\text{top} A$$
Similarly, the force on the volume element from the pressure of the fluid below pushing upwards is
$$F_\text{bottom} = P_\text{bottom} A$$

Finally, the weight of the volume element causes a force downwards. If the density is ρ, the volume is V and g the standard gravity, then:
$$F_\text{weight} = -\rho g V$$
The volume of this cuboid is equal to the area of the top or bottom, times the height – the formula for finding the volume of a cube.
$$F_\text{weight} = -\rho g A h$$

By balancing these forces, the total force on the fluid is
$$\sum F = F_\text{bottom} + F_\text{top} + F_\text{weight} = P_\text{bottom} A - P_\text{top} A - \rho g A h$$
This sum equals zero if the fluid's velocity is constant. Dividing by A,
$$0 = P_\text{bottom} - P_\text{top} - \rho g h$$
Or,
$$P_\text{top} - P_\text{bottom} = - \rho g h$$
P_{top} − P_{bottom} is a change in pressure, and h is the height of the volume element—a change in the distance above the ground. By saying these changes are infinitesimally small, the equation can be written in differential form.
$$dP = - \rho g \, dh$$
Density changes with pressure, and gravity changes with height, so the equation would be:
$$dP = - \rho(P) \, g(h) \, dh$$

=== Derivation from Navier–Stokes equations ===
Note finally that this last equation can be derived by solving the three-dimensional Navier–Stokes equations for the equilibrium situation where
$$u = v = \frac{\partial p}{\partial x} = \frac{\partial p}{\partial y} = 0$$
Then the only non-trivial equation is the $z$-equation, which now reads
$$\frac{\partial p}{\partial z} + \rho g = 0$$
Thus, hydrostatic balance can be regarded as a particularly simple equilibrium solution of the Navier–Stokes equations.

=== Derivation from general relativity ===
By plugging the energy–momentum tensor for a perfect fluid
$$T^{\mu\nu} = \left(\rho c^{2} + P\right) u^\mu u^\nu + P g^{\mu\nu}$$
into the Einstein field equations
$$R_{\mu\nu} = \frac{8\pi G}{c^4} \left(T_{\mu\nu} - \frac{1}{2} g_{\mu\nu} T\right)$$
and using the conservation condition
$$\nabla_\mu T^{\mu\nu} = 0$$
one can derive the Tolman–Oppenheimer–Volkoff equation for the structure of a static, spherically symmetric relativistic star in isotropic coordinates:
$$\frac{dP}{dr} = -\frac{G M(r)\rho(r)}{r^2} \left(1+\frac{P(r)}{\rho(r)c^2}\right) \left(1+\frac{4\pi r^3 P(r)}{M(r) c^2}\right) \left(1 - \frac{2GM(r)}{r c^2}\right)^{-1}$$
In practice, Ρ and ρ are related by an equation of state of the form f(Ρ,ρ) = 0, with f specific to makeup of the star. M(r) is a foliation of spheres weighted by the mass density ρ(r), with the largest sphere having radius r:
$$M(r) = 4\pi \int_0^r dr' \, r'^2 \rho(r').$$
Per standard procedure in taking the nonrelativistic limit, we let c → ∞, so that the factor
$$\left(1+\frac{P(r)}{\rho(r)c^2}\right) \left(1+\frac{4\pi r^3P(r)}{M(r)c^2}\right) \left(1-\frac{2GM(r)}{r c^2} \right)^{-1} \rightarrow 1$$
Therefore, in the nonrelativistic limit the Tolman–Oppenheimer–Volkoff equation reduces to Newton's hydrostatic equilibrium:
$$\frac{dP}{dr} = -\frac{GM(r)\rho(r)}{r^2} = -g(r)\,\rho(r)\longrightarrow dP = - \rho(h)\,g(h)\, dh$$
(we have made the trivial notation change h = r and have used f(Ρ,ρ) = 0 to express ρ in terms of P). A similar equation can be computed for rotating, axially symmetric stars, which in its gauge independent form reads:
$$\frac{\partial_i P}{P+\rho} - \partial_i \ln u^t + u_t u^\varphi\partial_i\frac{u_\varphi}{u_t}=0$$
Unlike the TOV equilibrium equation, these are two equations (for instance, if as usual when treating stars, one chooses spherical coordinates as basis coordinates $(t,r,\theta,\varphi)$, the index i runs for the coordinates r and $\theta$).

== Applications ==
=== Fluids ===
The hydrostatic equilibrium pertains to hydrostatics and the principles of equilibrium of fluids. A hydrostatic balance is a particular balance for weighing substances in water. Hydrostatic balance allows the discovery of their specific gravities. This equilibrium is strictly applicable when an ideal fluid is in steady horizontal laminar flow, and when any fluid is at rest or in vertical motion at constant speed. It can also be a satisfactory approximation when flow speeds are low enough that acceleration is negligible.

=== Astrophysics and planetary science ===
From the time of Isaac Newton much work has been done on the subject of the equilibrium attained when a fluid rotates in space. This has application to both stars and objects like planets, which may have been fluid in the past or in which the solid material deforms like a fluid when subjected to very high stresses.

In any given layer of a star, there is a hydrostatic equilibrium between the outward-pushing pressure gradient and the weight of the material above pressing inward. One can also study planets under the assumption of hydrostatic equilibrium. A rotating star or planet in hydrostatic equilibrium is usually an oblate spheroid, an ellipsoid in which two of the principal axes are equal and longer than the third.

An example of this phenomenon is the star Vega, which has a rotation period of 12.5 hours. Consequently, Vega is about 20% larger at the equator than from pole to pole.

In his 1687 Philosophiæ Naturalis Principia Mathematica Newton correctly stated that a rotating fluid of uniform density under the influence of gravity would take the form of a spheroid and that the gravity (including the effect of centrifugal force) would be weaker at the equator than at the poles by an amount equal (at least asymptotically) to five fourths the centrifugal force at the equator. In 1742, Colin Maclaurin published his treatise on fluxions in which he showed that the spheroid was an exact solution. If we designate the equatorial radius by $r_e,$ the polar radius by $r_p,$ and the eccentricity by $\epsilon,$ with

$$\epsilon=\sqrt{1-r_p^2/r_e^2},$$

he found that the gravity at the poles is

$$\begin{align}
g_p & =4\pi\frac{r_p}{r_e}\frac{\epsilon r_e-r_p\arctan(\epsilon r_e/r_p)}{\epsilon^3}G\rho \\
&=3\frac{\epsilon r_e-r_p\arctan(\epsilon r_e/r_p)}{\epsilon^3 r_e^3}GM \\
\end{align}$$

where $G$ is the gravitational constant, $\rho$ is the (uniform) density, and $M$ is the total mass. The ratio of this to $g_0,$ the gravity if the fluid is not rotating, is asymptotic to

$$g_p/g_0\sim 1+\frac 1{15}\epsilon^2\sim 1+\frac 2 {15} f$$

as $\epsilon$ goes to zero, where $f$ is the flattening:

$$f=\frac{r_e-r_p}{r_e}.$$

The gravitational attraction on the equator (not including centrifugal force) is

$$\begin{align}
g_e &=\frac 32\left(\frac 1{r_e r_p}-\frac{\epsilon r_e-r_p\arctan(\epsilon r_e/r_p)}{\epsilon^3 r_e^2 r_p}\right)GM\\
& =\frac 32\frac{r_e\arctan(\epsilon r_e/r_p)-\epsilon r_p}{\epsilon^3 r_e^3} GM \\
\end{align}$$

Asymptotically, we have:

$$g_e/g_0\sim 1-\frac 1{30}\epsilon^2\sim 1-\frac 1 {15} f$$

Maclaurin showed (still in the case of uniform density) that the component of gravity toward the axis of rotation depended only on the distance from the axis and was proportional to that distance, and the component in the direction toward the plane of the equator depended only on the distance from that plane and was proportional to that distance. Newton had already pointed out that the gravity felt on the equator (including the lightening due to centrifugal force) has to be $\frac{r_p}{r_e}g_p$ in order to have the same pressure at the bottom of channels from the pole or from the equator to the centre, so the centrifugal force at the equator must be

$$g_e-\frac{r_p}{r_e}g_p\sim \frac 25\epsilon^2g_e\sim\frac 45fg_e.$$

Defining the latitude to be the angle between a tangent to the meridian and axis of rotation, the total gravity felt at latitude $\phi$ (including the effect of centrifugal force) is

$$g(\phi)=\frac{g_p(1-f)}{\sqrt{1-(2f-f^2)\sin^2\phi}}.$$

This spheroid solution is stable up to a certain (critical) angular momentum (normalized by $M\sqrt{G\rho r_e}$), but in 1834, Carl Jacobi showed that it becomes unstable once the eccentricity reaches 0.81267 (or $f$ reaches 0.3302). Above the critical value, the solution becomes a Jacobi, or scalene, ellipsoid (one with all three axes different). Henri Poincaré in 1885 found that at still higher angular momentum it will no longer be ellipsoidal but oviform or piriform. The symmetry drops from the 8-fold D_{2h} point group to the 4-fold C_{2v}, with its axis perpendicular to the axis of rotation. Other shapes satisfy the equations beyond that, but are not stable, at least not near the point of bifurcation. Poincaré was unsure what would happen at higher angular momentum but concluded that eventually the blob would split into two.

The assumption of uniform density may apply more or less to a molten planet or a rocky planet but does not apply to a star or to a planet like the earth which has a dense metallic core. In 1737, Alexis Clairaut studied the case of density varying with depth. Clairaut's theorem states that the variation of the gravity (including centrifugal force) is proportional to the square of the sine of the latitude, with the proportionality depending linearly on the flattening ($f$) and the ratio at the equator of centrifugal force to gravitational attraction. (Compare with the exact relation above for the case of uniform density.) Clairaut's theorem is a special case for an oblate spheroid of a connexion found later by Pierre-Simon Laplace between the shape and the variation of gravity.

If the star has a massive nearby companion object, or a moon is tidally locked, tidal forces come into play as well, which distort the star or moon into a scalene shape even if rotation alone would make it a spheroid. Examples of this are Beta Lyrae and Mimas.

Hydrostatic equilibrium is also important for the intracluster medium, where it restricts the amount of fluid that can be present in the core of a cluster of galaxies.

We can also use the principle of hydrostatic equilibrium to estimate the velocity dispersion of dark matter in clusters of galaxies. Only baryonic matter (or, rather, the collisions thereof) emits X-ray radiation. The absolute X-ray luminosity per unit volume takes the form $\mathcal{L}_X=\Lambda(T_B)\rho_B^2$ where $T_B$ and $\rho_B$ are the temperature and density of the baryonic matter, and $\Lambda(T)$ is some function of temperature and fundamental constants. The baryonic density satisfies the above equation $dP = -\rho g \, dr$:
$$p_B(r+dr)-p_B(r)=-dr\frac{\rho_B(r)G}{r^2}\int_0^r 4\pi r^2\,\rho_M(r)\, dr.$$
The integral is a measure of the total mass of the cluster, with $r$ being the proper distance to the center of the cluster. Using the ideal gas law $p_B=kT_B\rho_B/m_B$ ($k$ is the Boltzmann constant and $m_B$ is a characteristic mass of the baryonic gas particles) and rearranging, we arrive at
$$\frac{d}{dr}\left(\frac{kT_B(r)\rho_B(r)}{m_B}\right)=-\frac{\rho_B(r)G}{r^2}\int_0^r 4\pi r^2\,\rho_M(r)\, dr.$$
Multiplying by $r^2/\rho_B(r)$ and differentiating with respect to $r$ yields
$$\frac{d}{dr}\left[\frac{r^2}{\rho_B(r)}\frac{d}{dr}\left(\frac{kT_B(r)\rho_B(r)}{m_B}\right)\right]=-4\pi Gr^2\rho_M(r).$$
If we make the assumption that cold dark matter particles have an isotropic velocity distribution, the same derivation applies to these particles, and their density $\rho_D=\rho_M-\rho_B$ satisfies the non-linear differential equation
$$\frac{d}{dr}\left[\frac{r^2}{\rho_D(r)}\frac{d}{dr}\left(\frac{kT_D(r)\rho_D(r)}{m_D}\right)\right]=-4\pi Gr^2\rho_M(r).$$
With perfect X-ray and distance data, we could calculate the baryon density at each point in the cluster and thus the dark matter density. We could then calculate the velocity dispersion $\sigma^2_D$ of the dark matter, which is given by
$$\sigma^2_D=\frac{kT_D}{m_D}.$$
The central density ratio $\rho_B(0)/\rho_M(0)$ is dependent on the redshift $z$ of the cluster and is given by
$$\rho_B(0)/\rho_M(0)\propto (1+z)^2\left(\frac{\theta}{s}\right)^{3/2}$$
where $\theta$ is the angular width of the cluster and $s$ the proper distance to the cluster. Values for the ratio range from 0.11 to 0.14 for various surveys.

=== Planetary geology ===
The concept of hydrostatic equilibrium has also become important in determining whether an astronomical object is a planet, dwarf planet, or small Solar System body. According to the definition of planet that was adopted by the International Astronomical Union in 2006, one defining characteristic of planets and dwarf planets is that they are objects that have sufficient gravity to overcome their own rigidity and assume hydrostatic equilibrium. Such a body often has the differentiated interior and geology of a world (a planemo), but near-hydrostatic or formerly hydrostatic bodies such as the proto-planet 4 Vesta may also be differentiated and some hydrostatic bodies (notably Callisto) have not thoroughly differentiated since their formation. Often, the equilibrium shape is an oblate spheroid, as is the case with Earth. However, in the cases of moons in synchronous orbit, nearly unidirectional tidal forces create a scalene ellipsoid. Also, the purported dwarf planet Haumea is scalene because of its rapid rotation though it may not currently be in equilibrium.

Icy objects were previously believed to need less mass to attain hydrostatic equilibrium than rocky objects. The smallest object that appears to have an equilibrium shape is the icy moon Mimas at 396 km, but the largest icy object known to have an obviously non-equilibrium shape is the icy moon Proteus at 420 km, and the largest rocky bodies in an obviously non-equilibrium shape are the asteroids Pallas and Vesta at about 520 km. However, Mimas is not actually in hydrostatic equilibrium for its current rotation. The smallest body confirmed to be in hydrostatic equilibrium is the dwarf planet Ceres, which is icy, at 945 km, and the largest known body to have a noticeable deviation from hydrostatic equilibrium is Iapetus being made of mostly permeable ice and almost no rock. At 1,469 km Iapetus is neither spherical nor ellipsoid. Instead, it is rather in a strange walnut-like shape due to its unique equatorial ridge. Some icy bodies may be in equilibrium at least partly due to a subsurface ocean, which is not the definition of equilibrium used by the IAU (gravity overcoming internal rigid-body forces). Even larger bodies deviate from hydrostatic equilibrium, although they are ellipsoidal: examples are Earth's Moon at 3,474 km (mostly rock), and the planet Mercury at 4,880 km (mostly metal).

In 2024, Kiss et al. found that Quaoar has an ellipsoidal shape incompatible with hydrostatic equilibrium for its current spin. They hypothesised that Quaoar originally had a rapid rotation and was in hydrostatic equilibrium but that its shape became "frozen in" and did not change as it spun down because of tidal forces from its moon Weywot. If so, this would resemble the situation of Iapetus, which is too oblate for its current spin. Iapetus is generally still considered a planetary-mass moon nonetheless though not always.

Solid bodies have irregular surfaces, but local irregularities may be consistent with global equilibrium. For example, the massive base of the tallest mountain on Earth, Mauna Kea, has deformed and depressed the level of the surrounding crust and so the overall distribution of mass approaches equilibrium.

=== Atmospheric modeling ===
In the atmosphere, the pressure of the air decreases with increasing altitude. This pressure difference causes an upward force called the pressure-gradient force. The downward force of gravity balances this out, keeps the atmosphere bound to Earth and maintains pressure differences with altitude. These forces remain balanced on broad scales, allowing for a reasonable estimate of air pressure given altitude. This allows the use of pressure as a vertical coordinate. This balance implies that the vertical large-scale motions in Earth's atmosphere are negligible compared to horizontal motions, and observations show that this balance is maintained to within 1% at such scales. The assumption of hydrostatic balance serves as the basis for the hydrostatic approximation of the Navier–Stokes equations and is invoked in many atmospheric models. At smaller scales, such as within thunderstorms, departures in flow from hydrostatic balance become significant.

== See also ==
- List of gravitationally rounded objects of the Solar System; a list of objects that have a rounded, ellipsoidal shape due to their own gravity (but are not necessarily in hydrostatic equilibrium)
- Potato radius
- Statics
- Two-balloon experiment
