= Ice planet =

Planet with an icy surface

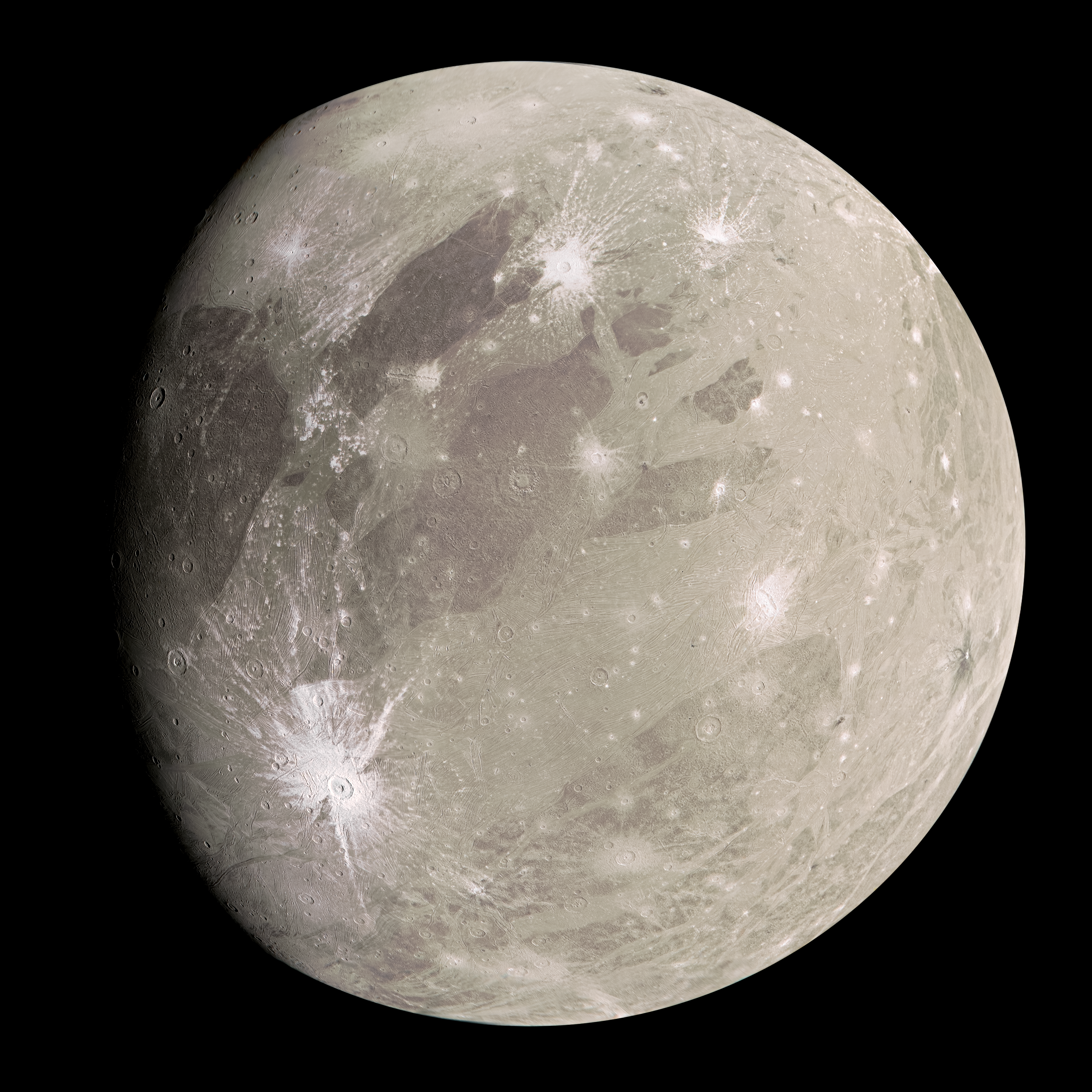
Ganymede, the largest known solid icy body in the Solar System

An ice planet or icy planet is a type of planet with an icy surface of volatiles such as water, ammonia, and methane. Ice planets consist of a global cryosphere.

Under a geophysical definition of planet, the small icy worlds of the Solar System qualify as icy planets. These include most of the planetary-mass moons, such as Ganymede, Titan, Europa, Enceladus, and Triton; dwarf planets Pluto, Orcus, Haumea, Makemake, Quaoar, Sedna, Gonggong, and Eris; and the largest comets. In June 2020, NASA scientists reported that it is likely that exoplanets with oceans, including some with oceans that may lie beneath a layer of surface ice, may be common in the Milky Way galaxy, based on mathematical modeling studies. OGLE-2005-BLG-390Lb, first observed in 2005, is a possible ice planet.

== Characteristics and habitability ==
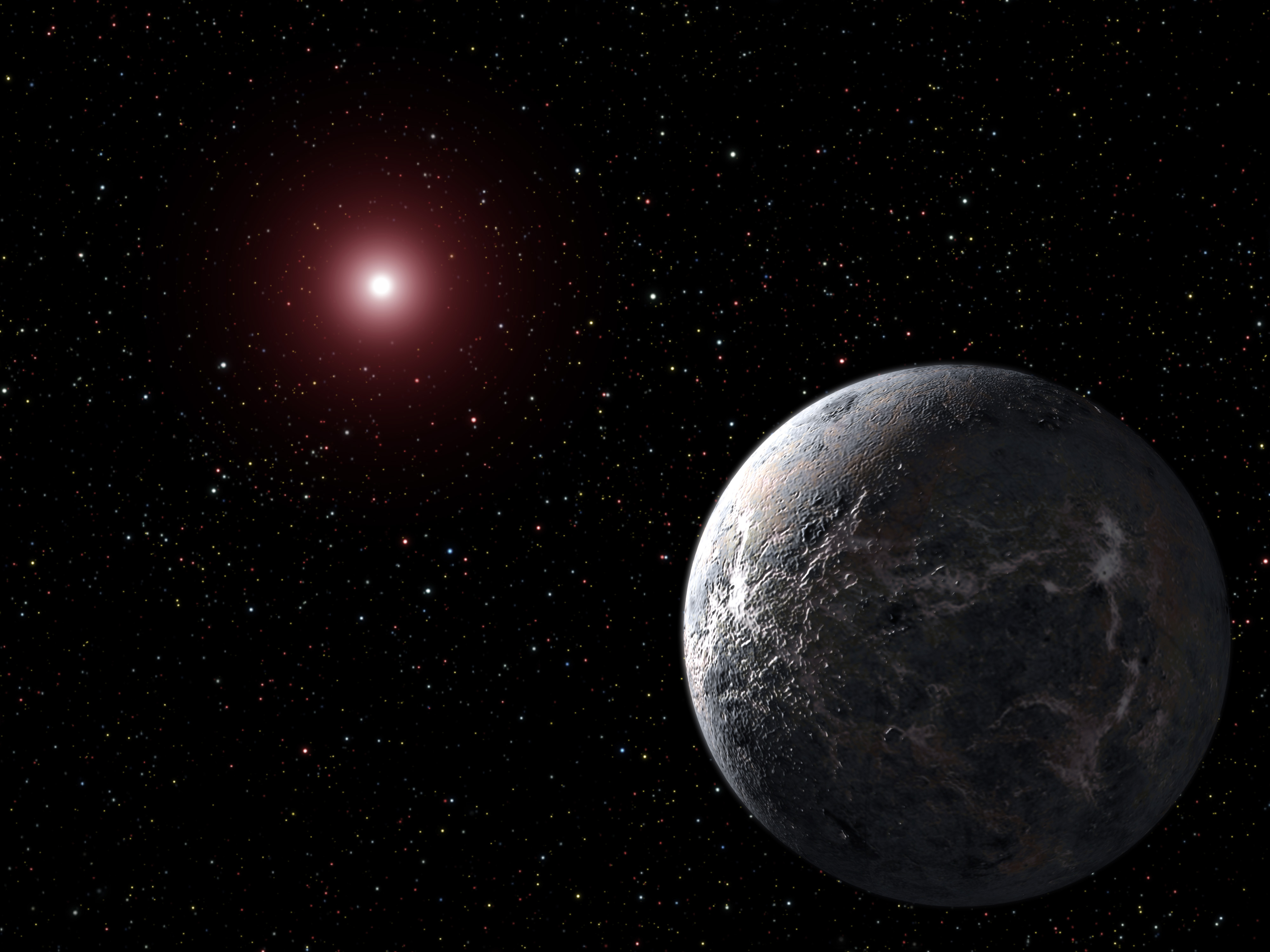
OGLE-2005-BLG-390Lb (artist's impression) is an example of likely ice planet

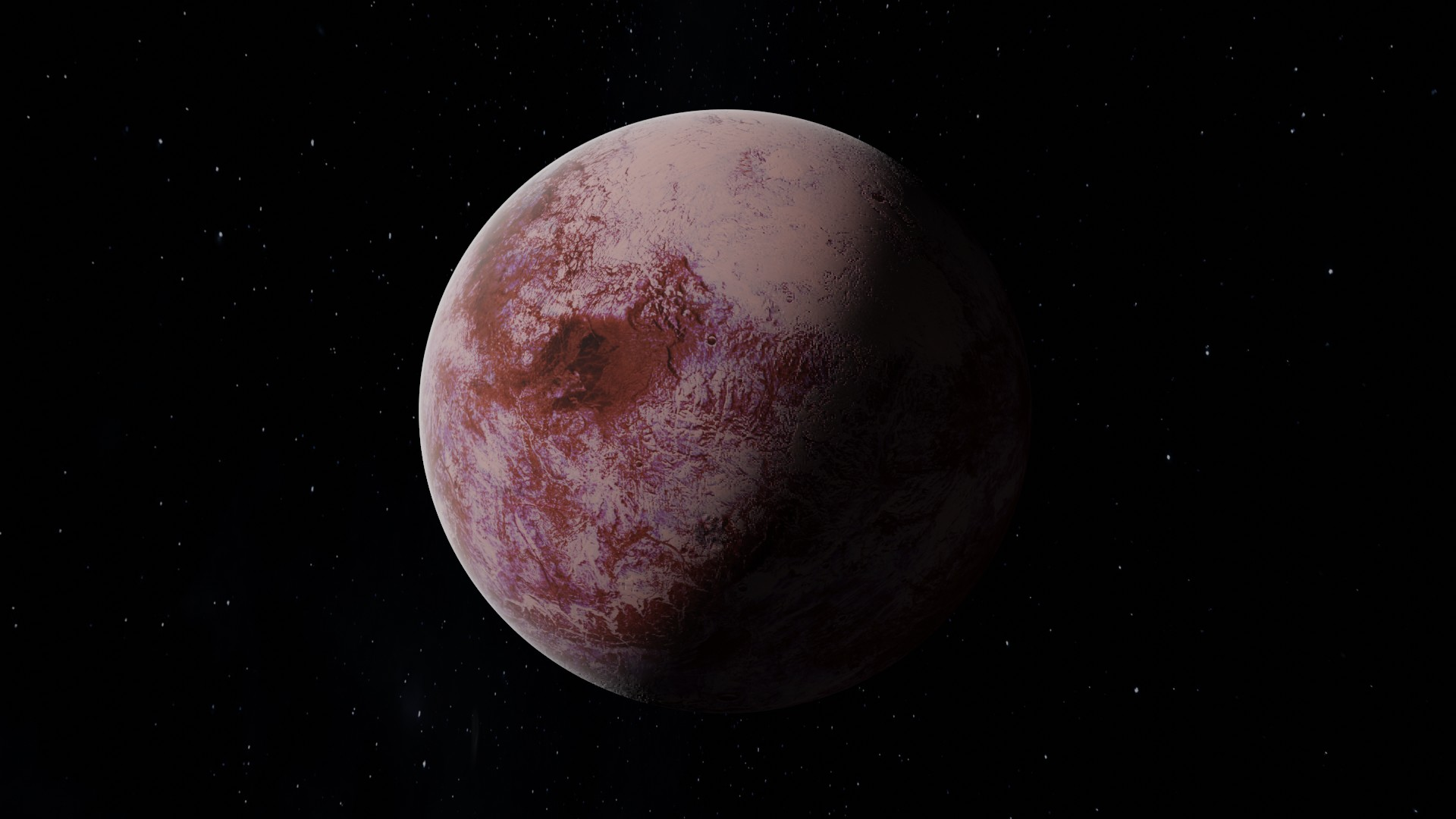
OGLE-2013-BLG-0341LB b (artist's impression)

An ice planet's surface can be composed of water, methane, ammonia, carbon dioxide (known as "dry ice"), carbon monoxide, nitrogen, and other volatiles, depending on its surface temperature. Ice planets would have surface temperatures below 260 K (−13 °C) if composed primarily of water, below 180 K (−93 °C) if primarily composed of CO_{2} and ammonia, and below 80 K (−193 °C) if composed primarily of methane.

On the surface, ice planets are hostile to life forms like those living on Earth because they are extremely cold. Many ice worlds likely have subsurface oceans, warmed by internal heat or tidal forces from another nearby body. Liquid subsurface water would provide habitable conditions for life, including fish, plankton, and microorganisms. Subsurface plants as we know them could not exist because there is no sunlight to use for photosynthesis. Microorganisms can produce nutrients using specific chemicals (chemosynthesis) that may provide food and energy for other organisms. Some planets, if conditions are right, may have significant atmospheres and surface liquids like Saturn's moon Titan, which could be habitable for exotic forms of life.

== Examples ==
=== In solar system ===
Although there are many icy objects in the Solar System, none of them qualify as planets under the IAU definition of planet. However, most planetary-mass moons are ice-rock (e.g. Ganymede, Callisto, Enceladus, Titan, and Triton) or even primarily ice (e.g. Mimas, Tethys, Rhea, and Iapetus) and so qualify as ice planets under geophysical definitions of the term. The largest Kuiper belt objects, such as Pluto, Haumea, Makemake, Charon, Quaoar, and Orcus also qualify as such under geophysical definitions. Europa is also often considered an ice planet due to its surface ice, though its high density indicates that its interior is mostly rocky. The same is true for the scattered-disc object Eris.

=== Beyond solar system ===
Dozens of known exoplanets are very probably ice planets, given their orbits, surfaces, densities, and host stars. Examples of ice planets include Gliese 667 C d, Gliese 667 C g, Kepler-441b, OGLE-2005-BLG-390Lb, OGLE-2013-BLG-0341LBb, OGLE-2016-BLG-1195Lb and MOA-2007-BLG-192Lb.

== See also ==
- Ice giant
- Icy moon
- Ocean world
- Snowball Earth
- Hoth – Fictional planet in Star Wars
