= How I Killed Pluto and Why It Had It Coming =

Book by Michael E. Brown

- Author: Michael E. Brown
- Language: English
- Publication date: 2010
- Publication place: United States
- ISBN: 0-385-53108-7

How I Killed Pluto and Why It Had It Coming is a 2010 memoir by Mike Brown, the American astronomer most responsible for the reclassification of Pluto from planet to dwarf planet.

== Summary ==
The memoir is an account of the events surrounding the redefinition of the term planet that eventually changed the status of Pluto.

Brown recounts his professional career as a faculty member at the California Institute of Technology leading a team which examined large patches of the sky in an attempt to identify and track Trans-Neptunian objects.

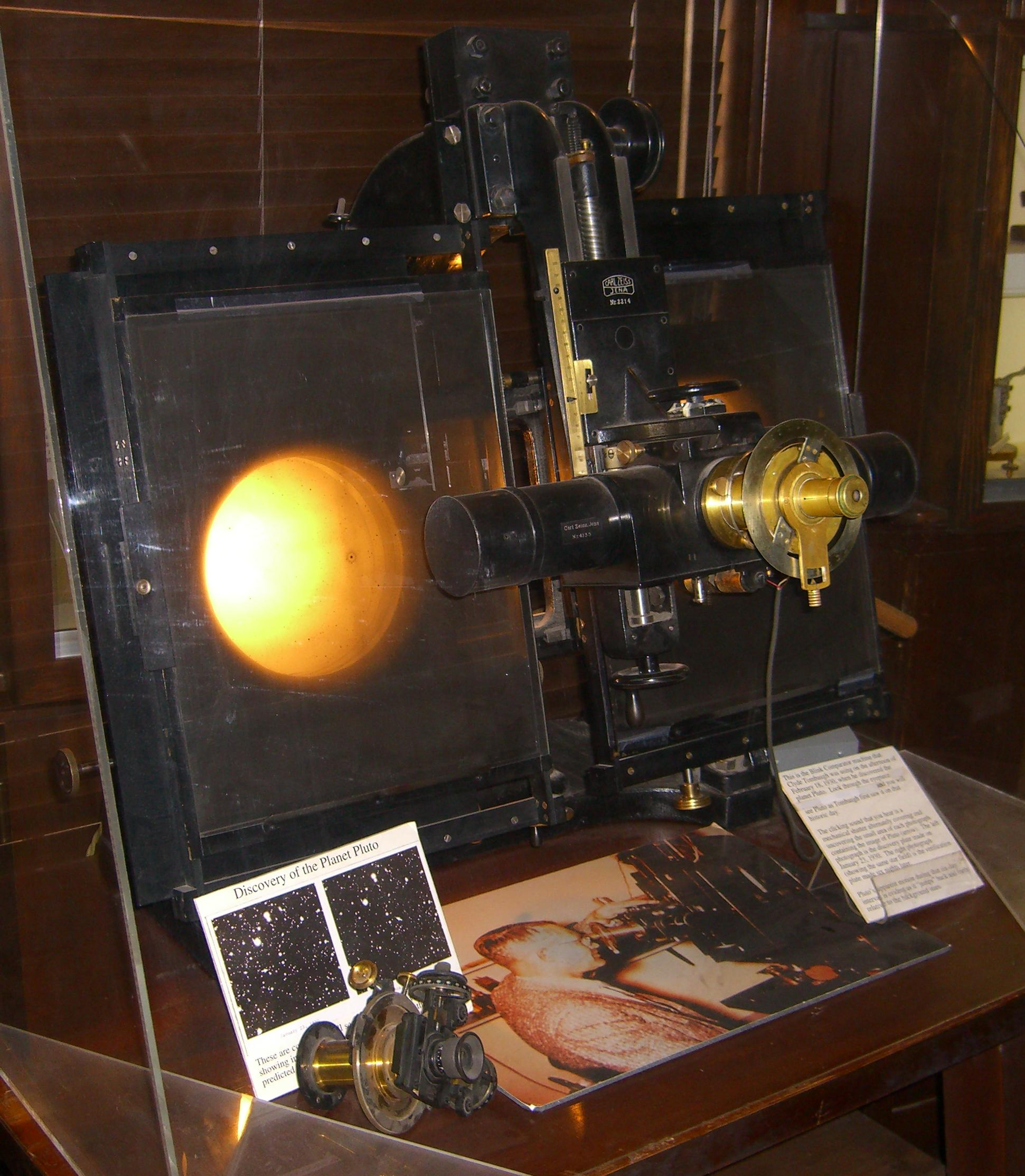
Photographic plates requiring manual comparison to find differences

In the 1990s, the team utilizes photographic plates (as used by Clyde Tombaugh to discover Pluto in 1930), a painstaking process that did not yield good results.

The team progresses to computer software and digital scanning technology, writing code to automatically identify patches of sky with moving stars. Early versions of the software identified many false positives due to smudges and light artifacts.

Into the early 2000s, the team is successful in finding a series of Kuiper belt objects.

The first, dubbed "Object X" (Quaoar) is discovered in 2002. A year later, Brown's team finds more objects, which the team dubs "Santa" (Haumea) and "Easter Bunny" (Makemake) as they were discovered close to the holidays.

Brown's team intends to keep the discoveries a secret until they have surveyed them for several months and are able to write a formal scientific paper on each of them. This is in order to avoid misleading the public about the materials and size of the planets, as each one they have found up to now was thought to be larger than Pluto at first - only for size measurements to be refined down due to brighter-than-expected surface materials.

However, NASA researchers (who had to be contacted in order to arrange for Hubble operation time) plan to announce the discoveries at an upcoming conference.

A team of astronomers at the Sierra Nevada Observatory in Spain led by José Luis Ortiz Moreno, finds NASA's conference agenda, track down the object using a publicly available repository of the sky pictures used by Brown's team, and publish the discovery as their own. Brown initially allows them to take credit for it but swiftly changes his mind.

Against his original desire, Brown and his team schedule public press conferences and interviews about their work, releasing information about Makemake, Haumea, and a new discovery, Xena (Eris).

Brown also recounts his personal life, speaking about his wife Diane's role in consoling and advising him, along with the birth of his daughter Lilah in 2005, at the same time his team was rushing to complete reports on Eris.

Eris was mistakenly thought to be larger than Pluto, causing many to suggest that it may be the 10th planet. However, Brown himself dismisses this notion, stating that neither Pluto nor Eris should be considered planets due to their size difference with the rest of the Solar System objects. He also notes that shortly after Ceres and Vesta were discovered in the 1800s, those were also considered planets until they were reclassified as asteroids.

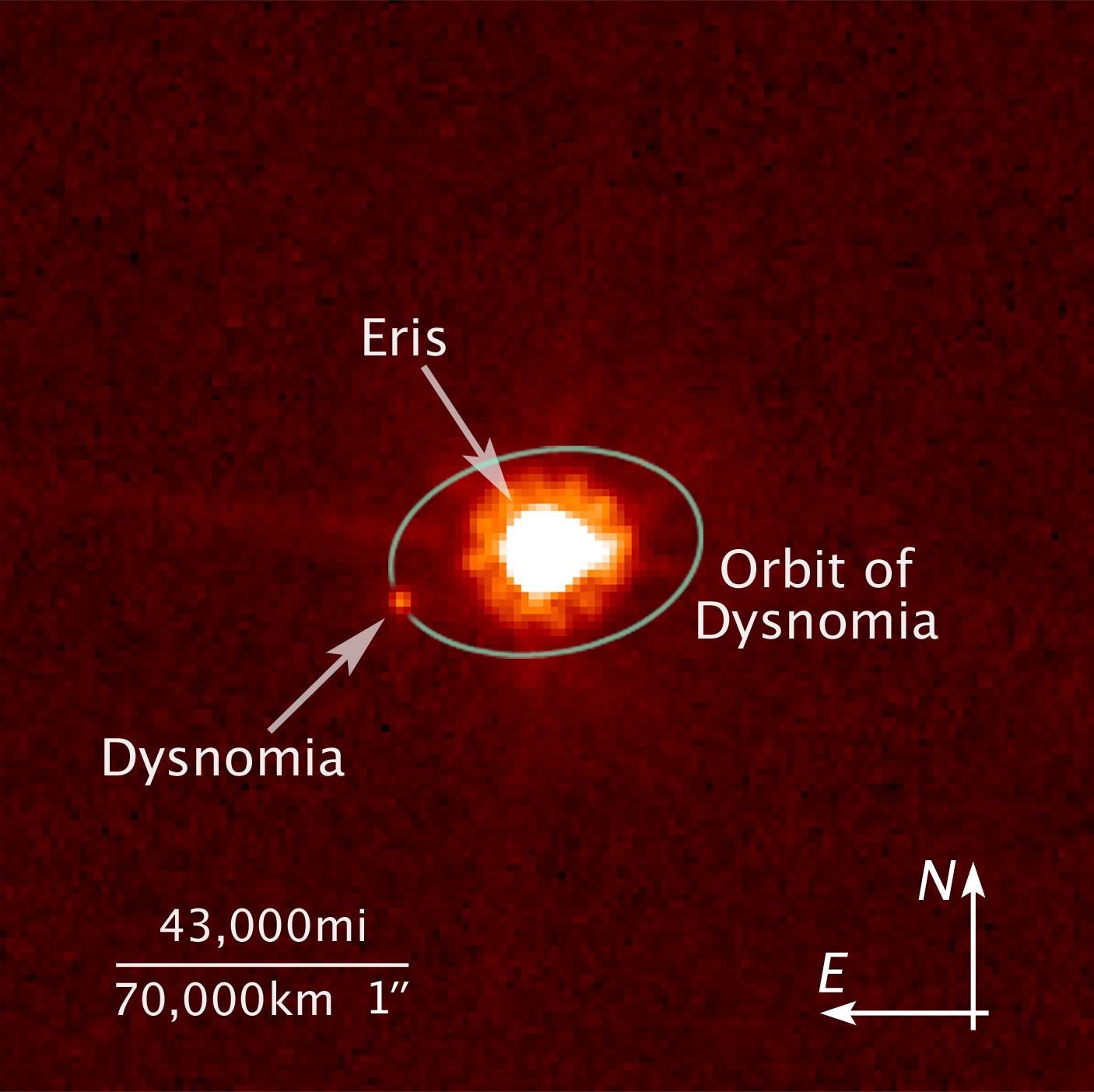
A picture of Eris taken with the Hubble Space Telescope in 2006

In 2006, after protracted argument over the definition of the term planet, the International Astronomical Union schedules a vote that removes Pluto from the list of Solar System planets. Pluto, Eris and all the objects that Brown's team discovered are renamed dwarf planets.

== Reviews ==
Reviews of the book have been generally positive, with James Kennedy of The Wall Street Journal calling the book a "brisk" and "enjoyable ... chronicle" of the tale of the search for new planets and the eventual demotion of Pluto from planetary status. Janet Maslin of The New York Times called it a "short, eager-to-please research memoir".

== See also ==
- List of former planets

== Bibliography ==
- Brown, Michael E. (2010). How I Killed Pluto and Why It Had It Coming. ISBN 978-0-385-53108-5.
