= Geophysical definition of planet =

Astronomic definition

The International Union of Geological Sciences (IUGS) is the internationally recognized body charged with fostering agreement on nomenclature and classification across geoscientific disciplines. However, they have yet to create a formal definition of the term "planet". As a result, there are various geophysical definitions in use among professional geophysicists, planetary scientists, and other professionals in the geosciences. Many professionals opt to use one of several of these geophysical definitions instead of the definition voted on by the International Astronomical Union, the dominant organization for setting planetary nomenclature.

== Definitions ==
Some geoscientists adhere to the formal definition of a planet that was proposed by the International Astronomical Union (IAU) in August 2006. According to IAU definition of planet, a planet is an astronomical object orbiting the Sun that is massive enough to be rounded by its own gravity, and has cleared the neighbourhood around its orbit.

Another widely accepted geophysical definition of a planet includes that which was put forth by planetary scientists Alan Stern and Harold Levison in 2002. The pair proposed the following rules to determine whether an object in space satisfies the definition for a planetary body.

A planetary body is defined as any body in space that satisfies the following testable upper and lower bound criteria on its mass: If isolated from external perturbations (e.g., dynamical and thermal), the body must:

1. Be low enough in mass that at no time (past or present) can it generate energy in its interior due to any self-sustaining nuclear fusion chain reaction (else it would be a brown dwarf or a star). And also,
2. Be large enough that its shape becomes determined primarily by gravity rather than mechanical strength or other factors (e.g. surface tension, rotation rate) in less than a Hubble time (roughly the current age of the universe), so that the body would on this timescale or shorter reach a state of hydrostatic equilibrium in its interior.

They explain their reasoning by noting that this definition delineates the evolutionary stages and primary features of planets more clearly. Specifically, they claim that the hallmark of planethood is "the collective behavior of the body's mass to overpower mechanical strength and flow into an equilibrium ellipsoid whose shape is dominated by its own gravity", and that the definition allows for "an early period during which gravity may not yet have fully manifested itself to be the dominant force".

They subclassified planetary bodies as:

- Planets: which orbit their stars directly
- Planetary-scale satellites: the largest being Moon, the Galilean satellites, Titan, and Triton, with the last apparently being "formerly a planet in its own right"
- Unbound planets: rogue planets between the stars
- Double planets: in which a planet and a massive satellite orbit a point between the two bodies (the single known example in the Solar System is Pluto–Charon)

Furthermore, there are important dynamical categories:

- Überplanets: orbit stars and are dynamically dominant enough to clear neighboring planetesimals in a Hubble time
- Unterplanets: which cannot clear their neighborhood, for example are in unstable orbits, or are in resonance with or orbit a more massive body. They set the boundary at Λ = 1.

A 2018 encapsulation of the above definition defined all planetary bodies as planets. It was worded for a more general audience, and was intended as an alternative to the IAU definition of a planet. It noted that planetary scientists find a different definition of "planet" to be more useful for their field, just as different fields define "metal" differently. For them, a planet is:

a substellar-mass body that has never undergone nuclear fusion and has enough gravitation to be round due to hydrostatic equilibrium, regardless of its orbital parameters.

Some variation can be found in how planetary scientists classify borderline objects, such as the asteroids Pallas and Vesta. These two are probably surviving protoplanets, and are larger than some clearly ellipsoidal objects, but currently are not very round (although Vesta likely was round in the past). Some definitions include them, while others do not.

== Other names for geophysical planets ==
In 2009, Jean-Luc Margot (who proposed a mathematical criterion for clearing the neighborhood) and Levison suggested that "roundness" should refer to bodies whose gravitational forces exceed their material strength, and that round bodies could be called "worlds". They noted that such a geophysical classification was sound and was not necessarily in conflict with the dynamical conception of a planet: for them, "planet" is defined dynamically, and is a subset of "world" (which also includes dwarf planets, round moons, and free floaters). However, they pointed out that a taxonomy based on roundness is highly problematic because roundness is very rarely directly observable, is a continuum, and proxying it based on size or mass leads to inconsistencies because planetary material strength depends on temperature, composition, and mixing ratios. For example, icy Mimas is round at 396-kilometre (246 mi) diameter, but rocky Vesta is not at 525-kilometre (326 mi) diameter. Thus they stated that some uncertainty could be tolerated in classifying an object as a world, while its dynamical classification could be simply determined from mass and orbital period.

== Geophysical planets in the Solar System ==
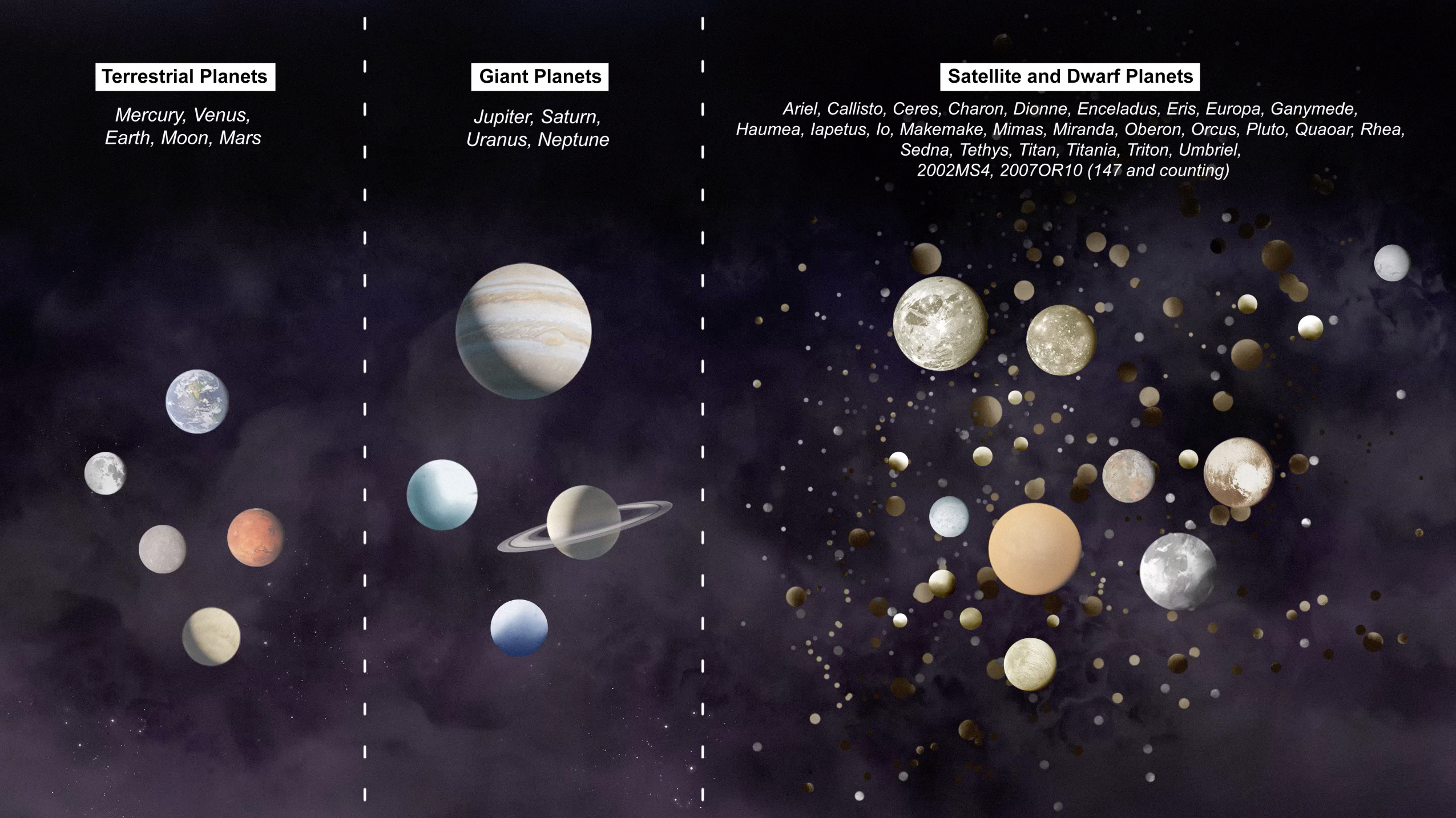
Under geophysical definitions of a planet, there are more satellite and dwarf planets in the Solar System than classical planets.

The number of geophysical planets in the Solar System cannot be objectively listed, as it depends on the precise definition as well as detailed knowledge of a number of poorly-observed bodies, and there are some borderline cases. At the time of the IAU definition in 2006, it was thought that the limit at which icy astronomical bodies were likely to be in hydrostatic equilibrium was around 400 kilometres (250 mi) in diameter, suggesting that there were a large number of dwarf planets in the Kuiper belt and scattered disk. However, by 2010 it was known that icy moons up to 1,500 kilometres (930 mi) in diameter (e.g. Iapetus) are not in equilibrium. Iapetus is round, but is too oblate for its current spin: it has an equilibrium shape for a rotation period of 16 hours, not its actual spin of 79 days. This might be because the shape of Iapetus was frozen by formation of a thick crust shortly after its formation, while its rotation continued to slow afterwards due to tidal dissipation, until it became tidally locked. Most geophysical definitions list such bodies anyway. (In fact, this is already the case with the IAU definition; Mercury is now known to not be in hydrostatic equilibrium, but it is universally considered to be a planet regardless.)

In 2019, Grundy et al. argued that trans-Neptunian objects up to 900 to 1,000 kilometres (560 to 620 mi) in diameter (e.g. Uni and Gǃkúnǁʼhòmdímà) have never compressed out their internal porosity, and are thus not planetary bodies. In 2023, Emery et al. argued for a similar threshold for chemical evolution in the trans-Neptunian region. Such a high threshold suggests that at most nine known trans-Neptunian objects could possibly be geophysical planets: Pluto, Eris, Haumea, Makemake, Gonggong, Charon, Quaoar, Orcus, and Sedna pass the 900-kilometre (560 mi) threshold.

The bodies generally agreed to be geophysical planets include the eight major planets:

1. ☿ Mercury
2. ♀ Venus
3. 🜨 Earth
4. ♂ Mars
5. ♃ Jupiter
6. ♄ Saturn
7. ⛢ Uranus
8. ♆ Neptune

nine dwarf planets that geophysicists generally agree are planets:

1. Ceres
2. Orcus
3. Pluto
4. Haumea
5. Quaoar
6. Makemake
7. Gonggong
8. Eris
9. Sedna

and nineteen planetary-mass moons:

- One satellite of Earth – the Moon
- Four satellites of Jupiter – Io, Europa, Ganymede, and Callisto
- Seven satellites of Saturn – Mimas, Enceladus, Tethys, Dione, Rhea, Titan, and Iapetus
- Five satellites of Uranus – Miranda, Ariel, Umbriel, Titania, and Oberon
- One satellite of Neptune – Triton
- One satellite of Pluto – Charon

Some other objects are sometimes included at the borderlines, such as the asteroids Pallas, Vesta, and Hygiea (larger than Mimas, but Pallas and Vesta are noticeably not round); Neptune's second-largest moon Proteus (larger than Mimas, but still not round); or some other trans-Neptunian objects that might or might not be dwarf planets.

An examination of spacecraft imagery suggests that the threshold at which an object is large enough to be rounded by self-gravity (whether due to purely gravitational forces, as with Pluto and Titan, or augmented by tidal heating, as with Io and Europa) is approximately the threshold of geological activity. However, there are exceptions such as Callisto and Mimas, which have equilibrium shapes (historical in the case of Mimas) but show no signs of past or present endogenous geological activity, and Enceladus, which is geologically active due to tidal heating but is apparently not currently in equilibrium.

== Comparison to IAU definition of a planet ==
Some geophysical definitions are the same as the IAU definition, while other geophysical definitions tend to be more or less equivalent to the second clause of the IAU definition of planet.

Stern's 2018 definition, but not his 2002 definition, excludes the first clause of the IAU definition (that a planet be in orbit around a star) and the third clause (that a planet has cleared the neighborhood around its orbit). It thus counts dwarf planets and planetary-mass moons as planets.

Five bodies are currently recognized as or named as dwarf planets by the IAU: Ceres, Pluto (the dwarf planet with the largest known radius), Eris (the dwarf planet with the largest known mass), Haumea, and Makemake. Astronomers normally include these five, as well as four more: Quaoar, Sedna, Orcus, and Gonggong.

== Reaction to IAU definition ==
Many critics of the IAU decision were focused specifically on retaining Pluto as a planet and were not interested in debating or discussing how the term "planet" should be defined in geoscience. An early petition rejecting the IAU definition attracted more than 300 signatures, though not all of these critics supported an alternative definition.

Other critics took issue with the definition itself and wished to create alternative definitions that could be used in different disciplines.

The geophysical definition of a planet put forth by Stern and Levinson is an alternative to the IAU's definition of what is and is not a planet and is meant to stand as the geophysical definition, while the IAU definition, they argue, is intended more for astronomers. Nonetheless, some geologists favor the IAU's definition. Proponents of Stern and Levinson's geophysical definition have shown that such conceptions of what a planet is have been used by planetary scientists for decades, and continued after the IAU definition was established, and that asteroids have routinely been regarded as "minor" planets, though usage varies considerably.

== Applicability to exoplanets ==
Geophysical definitions have been used to define exoplanets. The 2006 IAU definition purposefully does not address the complication of exoplanets, though in 2003 the IAU declared that "the minimum mass required for an extrasolar object to be considered a planet should be the same as that used in the Solar System". While some geophysical definitions that differ from the IAU definition apply, in theory, to exoplanets and rogue planets, they have not been used in practice, due to ignorance of the geophysical properties of most exoplanets. Geophysical definitions typically exclude objects that have ever undergone nuclear fusion, and so may exclude the higher-mass objects included in exoplanet catalogs as well as the lower-mass objects. The Extrasolar Planets Encyclopaedia, Exoplanet Data Explorer and NASA Exoplanet Archive all include objects significantly more massive than the theoretical 13-Jupiter mass threshold at which deuterium fusion is believed to be supported, for reasons including: uncertainties in how this limit would apply to a body with a rocky core, uncertainties in the masses of exoplanets, and debate over whether deuterium-fusion or the mechanism of formation is the most appropriate criterion to distinguish a planet from a star. These uncertainties apply equally to the IAU conception of a planet.

Both the IAU definition and the geophysical definitions that differ from it consider the shape of the object, with consideration given to hydrostatic equilibrium. Determining the roundness of a body requires measurements across multiple chords (and even that is not enough to determine whether it is actually in equilibrium), but exoplanet detection techniques provide only the planet's mass, the ratio of its cross-sectional area to that of the host star, or its relative brightness. One small exoplanet, Kepler-1520b, has a mass of less than 0.02 times that of the Earth, and analogy to objects within the Solar System suggests that this may not be enough for a rocky body to be a planet. Another, WD 1145+017 b, is only 0.0007 Earth masses, while SDSS J1228+1040 b may be only 0.01 Earth radii in size, well below the upper equilibrium limit for icy bodies in the Solar System. (See List of smallest exoplanets.)

== See also ==
- List of gravitationally rounded objects of the Solar System – a list of objects generally accepted by astronomers to meet geophysical planet definitions, with many properties presented
