= IAU definition of planet =

2006 International Astronomical Union definition

Euler diagram showing the IAU Executive Committee conception of the types of bodies in the Solar System.

In August 2006, the International Astronomical Union (IAU) adopted a new definition of the term planet, which stated that, in the Solar System, (Note: Exoplanets are addressed in a 2003 position statement issued by a now-defunct IAU Working Group on Extrasolar Planets.) a planet is a celestial body that:

1. is in orbit around the Sun,
2. has sufficient mass to assume hydrostatic equilibrium (a nearly round shape), and
3. has "cleared the neighbourhood" around its orbit.

A non-satellite body fulfilling only the first two of these criteria (such as Pluto, which had hitherto been considered a planet) is classified as a dwarf planet and not a planet. A non-satellite body fulfilling only the first criterion is termed a small Solar System body (SSSB). An alternate proposal included dwarf planets as a subcategory of planets, but IAU members voted against this proposal. The decision was a controversial one, and has drawn both support and criticism from astronomers.

The IAU has stated that there are eight known planets in the Solar System. It has been argued that the definition is problematic because it depends on the location of the body: if a Mars-sized body were discovered in the inner Oort cloud, it would not have enough mass to clear out a neighbourhood that size and meet criterion 3. Mercury is not actually in hydrostatic equilibrium, but is explicitly included by the IAU definition as a planet.

The working definition of an exoplanet is as follows:

- Objects with true masses below the limiting mass for thermonuclear fusion of deuterium (currently calculated to be 13 Jupiter masses for objects of solar metallicity) that orbit stars, brown dwarfs or stellar remnants and that have a mass ratio with the central object below the L4/L5 instability (M/M_{central} < 2/(25+√621)) are "planets" (no matter how they formed).
- The minimum mass/size required for an extrasolar object to be considered a planet should be the same as that used in our Solar System.

== Background ==
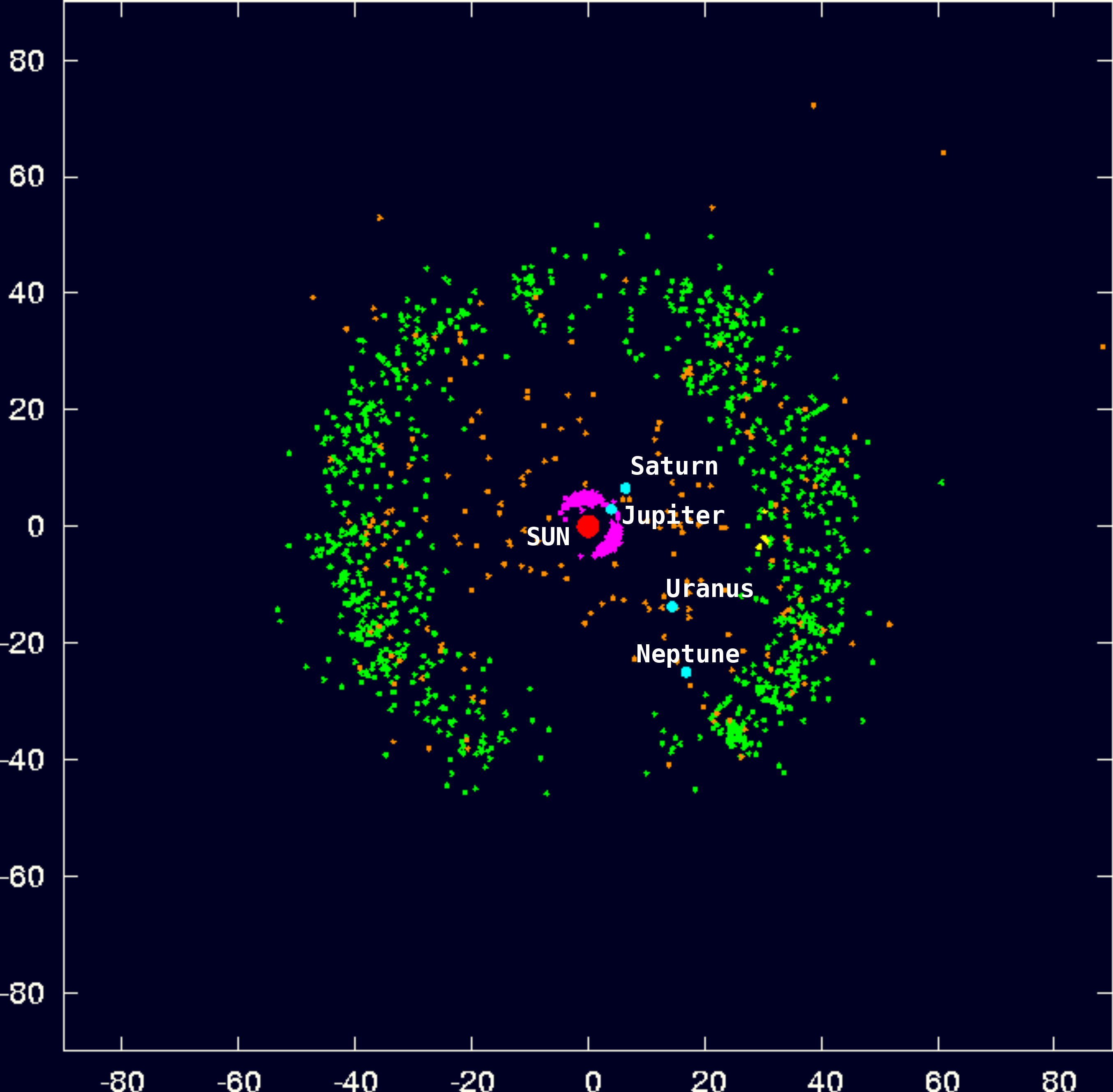
Plot of the positions of all known Kuiper belt objects (green), set against the outer planets (blue)

The process of new discoveries spurring a contentious refinement of Pluto's categorization echoed a debate in the 19th century that began with the discovery of Ceres on January 1, 1801. Astronomers immediately declared the tiny object to be the "missing planet" between Mars and Jupiter. Within four years, however, the discovery of two more objects with comparable sizes and orbits had cast doubt on this new thinking. By 1851, the number of planets had grown to 23 (the 8 major planets, plus 15 minor planets between Mars and Jupiter), and it was clear that hundreds more would eventually be discovered. Astronomers began cataloguing them separately and began calling them "asteroids" instead of "planets". With the discovery of Pluto by Clyde Tombaugh in 1930, astronomers considered the Solar System to have nine planets, along with thousands of smaller bodies such as asteroids and comets. Pluto was initially thought to be larger than Mercury.

Tombaugh discovered Pluto while working at the Lowell Observatory founded by Percival Lowell, one of many astronomers who had theorized on the existence of the large trans-Neptunian object Planet X, and Tombaugh had been searching for Planet X when he found Pluto. Almost immediately after its discovery, however, astronomers questioned whether Pluto could be Planet X. Willy Ley wrote a column in 1956 titled "The Demotion of Pluto", stating that it "simply failed to live up to the advance publicity it received as 'Planet X' before its discovery. It has been a disappointment all along, for it did not turn out to be what one could reasonably have expected".

In 1978, Pluto's moon Charon was discovered. By measuring Charon's orbital period, astronomers could accurately calculate Pluto's mass for the first time, which they found to be much smaller than expected. Pluto's mass was roughly one twenty-fifth of Mercury's, making it by far the smallest planet, smaller even than the Earth's Moon, although it was still over ten times as massive as the largest asteroid, Ceres.

In the 1990s, astronomers began finding other objects at least as far away as Pluto, known as Kuiper Belt objects, or KBOs. Many of these shared some of Pluto's key orbital characteristics and are consequently called plutinos. Pluto came to be seen as the largest member of a new class of objects, and some astronomers stopped referring to Pluto as a planet. Pluto's eccentric and inclined orbit, while very unusual for a planet in the Solar System, fits in well with the other KBOs. New York City's newly renovated Hayden Planetarium did not include Pluto in its exhibit of the planets when it reopened as the Rose Center for Earth and Space in 2000.

Starting in 2000, with the discovery of at least three bodies (Quaoar, Sedna, and Eris) all comparable to Pluto in terms of size and orbit, it became clear that either they all had to be called planets or Pluto would have to be reclassified. Astronomers also thought it likely that more objects as large as Pluto would be discovered, and the number of planets would start growing quickly. They were also concerned about the classification of planets in other planetary systems. In 2006, the first measurement of the volume of Eris erroneously (until the New Horizons mission to Pluto) showed it to be slightly larger than Pluto, and so was thought to be equally deserving of the status of "planet".

Because new planets are discovered infrequently, the IAU did not have any mechanism for their definition and naming. After the discovery of Sedna, it set up a 19-member committee in 2005, with the British astronomer Iwan Williams in the chair, to consider the definition of a planet. It proposed three definitions that could be adopted:

Cultural
a planet is a planet if enough people say it is;
Structural
a planet is large enough to form a sphere;
Dynamical
the object is large enough to cause all other objects to eventually leave its orbit.

Another committee, chaired by a historian of astronomy, Owen Gingerich, a historian and astronomer emeritus at Harvard University who led the committee which generated the original definition, and consisting of five planetary scientists and the science writer Dava Sobel, was set up to make a firm proposal.

== Proposals ==
=== First draft proposal ===
Illustration of the draft proposal

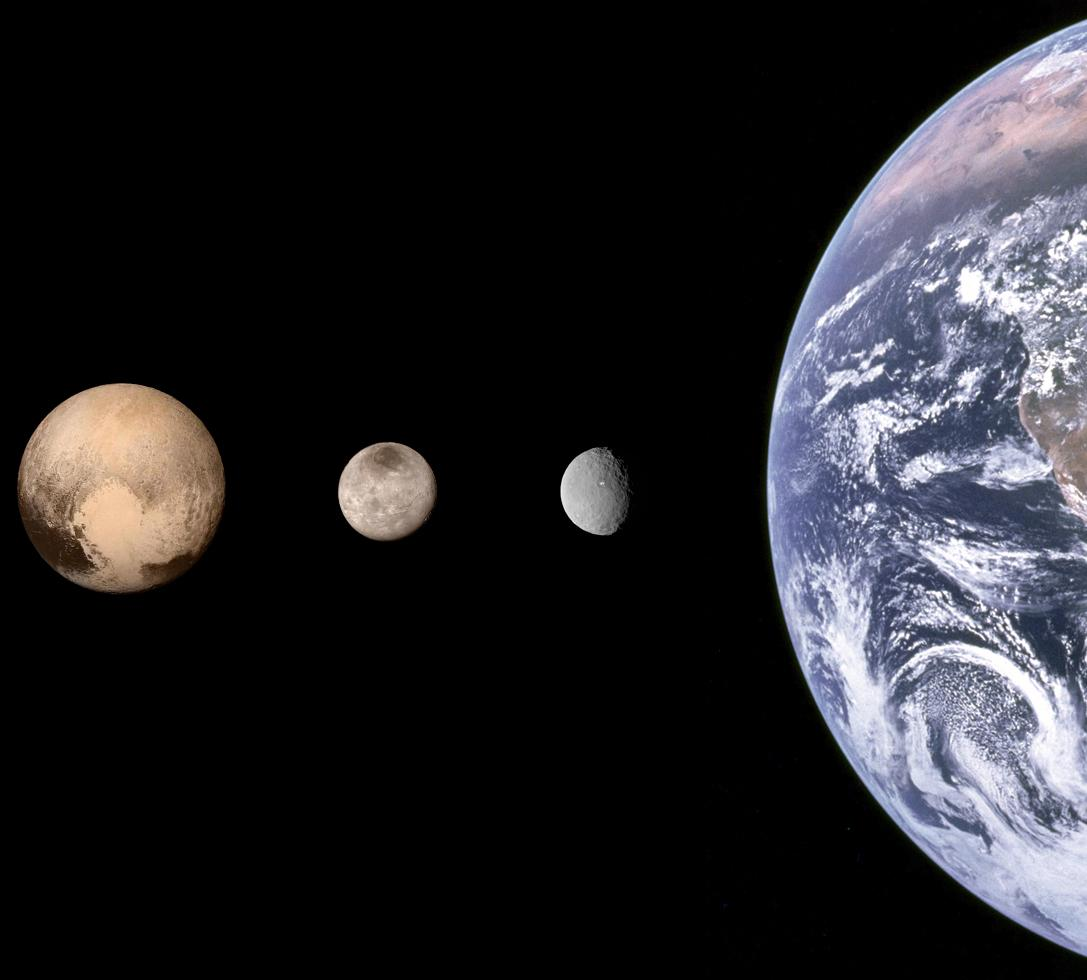
The original proposal would have immediately added three planets, shown here in a size comparison to Earth. Leftmost is Pluto (shown in lieu of Eris, which is about the same size), then Charon, Ceres, and Earth

The IAU published the original definition proposal on August 16, 2006. Its form followed loosely the second of three options proposed by the original committee. It stated that:

A planet is a celestial body that (a) has sufficient mass for its self-gravity to overcome rigid body forces so that it assumes a hydrostatic equilibrium (nearly round) shape, and (b) is in orbit around a star, and is neither a star nor a satellite of a planet.

This definition would have led to three more celestial bodies being recognized as planets, in addition to the previously accepted nine:

- Ceres, which had been considered a planet at the time of its discovery, but was subsequently treated as an asteroid
- Charon, a moon of Pluto; the Pluto–Charon system would have been considered a double planet
- Eris, a body in the scattered disk of the outer Solar System

A further twelve bodies, pending refinements of knowledge regarding their physical properties, were possible candidates to join the list under this definition. Some objects in this second list were more likely eventually to be adopted as 'planets' than others. Despite what had been claimed in the media, the proposal did not necessarily leave the Solar System with only twelve planets. Mike Brown, the discoverer of Sedna and Eris, has said that at least 53 known bodies in the Solar System probably fit the definition, and that a complete survey would probably reveal more than 200.

The definition would have considered a pair of objects to be a double planet system if each component independently satisfied the planetary criteria and the common center of gravity of the system (known as the barycenter) was located outside of both bodies. Pluto and Charon would have been the only known double planet in the Solar System. Other planetary satellites (such as the Moon or Ganymede) might be in hydrostatic equilibrium, but would still not have been defined as a component of a double planet, since the barycenter of the system lies within the more massive celestial body.

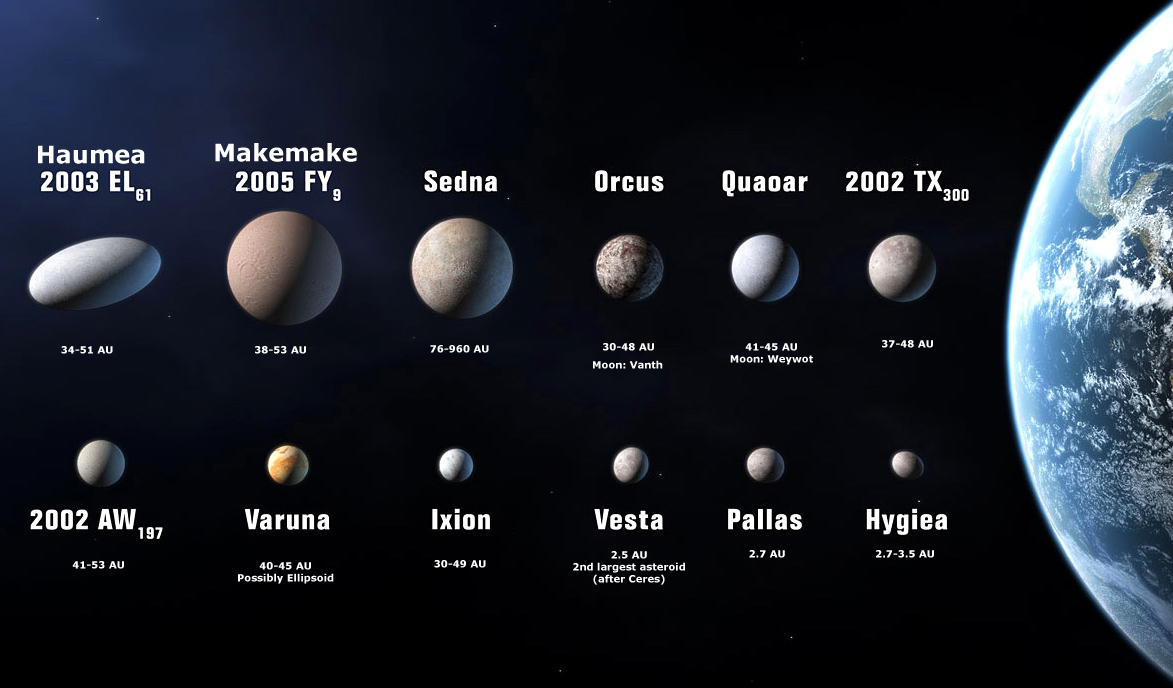
The twelve "candidate planets" that were possibilities for inclusion under the originally proposed definition. Note that all but the last three are trans-Neptunian objects. The smallest three (Vesta, Pallas, Hygiea) are in the asteroid belt.

The term "minor planet" would have been abandoned, replaced by the categories "small Solar System body" (SSSB) and a new classification of "pluton". The former would have described those objects underneath the "spherical" threshold. The latter would have been applied to those planets with highly inclined orbits, large eccentricities and an orbital period of more than 200 earth years (that is, those orbiting beyond Neptune). Pluto would have been the prototype for this class. The term "dwarf planet" would have been available to describe all planets smaller than the eight "classical planets" in orbit around the Sun, though would not have been an official IAU classification. The IAU did not make recommendations in the draft resolution on what separated a planet from a brown dwarf. A vote on the proposal was scheduled for August 24, 2006.

Such a definition of the term "planet" could also have led to changes in classification for the trans-Neptunian objects Haumea, Makemake, Sedna, Orcus, Quaoar, Varuna, 2002 TX_{300}, Ixion, and Aya, and the asteroids Vesta, Pallas, and Hygiea.

On 18 August the Committee of the Division of Planetary Sciences (DPS) of the American Astronomical Society endorsed the draft proposal. The DPS Committee represents a small subset of the DPS members, and no resolution in support of the IAU definition was considered or approved by the DPS membership.

According to an IAU draft resolution, the roundness condition generally results in the need for a mass of at least 5×10^{20} kg, or diameter of at least 800 km. However, Mike Brown claimed that these numbers are only right for rocky bodies like asteroids, and that icy bodies like Kuiper Belt objects reach hydrostatic equilibrium at much smaller sizes, probably somewhere between 200 and 400 km in diameter. It all depends on the rigidity of the material that makes up the body, which is in turn strongly influenced by its internal temperature. Assuming that Methone's shape reflects the balance between the tidal force exerted by Saturn and the moon's gravity, its tiny 3 km diameter suggests Methone is composed of icy fluff. The IAU's stated radius and mass limit are not too far off from what as of 2019 is believed to be the approximate limit for objects beyond Neptune that are fully compact, solid bodies, with Salacia (r = 423±11 km, m = (0.492±0.007)×10^{21} kg) and possibly Máni (r = 400±12 km, m unknown) being borderline cases both for the 2006 Q&A expectations and in more recent evaluations, and with Orcus being just above the expected limit.

==== Advantages ====
The proposed definition found support among many astronomers as it used the presence of a physical qualitative factor (the object being round) as its defining feature. Most other potential definitions depended on a limiting quantity (e.g., a minimum size or maximum orbital inclination) tailored for the Solar System. According to members of the IAU committee this definition did not use human-made limits but instead deferred to "nature" in deciding whether or not an object was a planet.

It also had the advantage of measuring an observable quality. Suggested criteria involving the nature of formation would have been more likely to see accepted planets later declassified as scientific understanding improved.

Additionally, the definition kept Pluto as a planet. Pluto's planetary status was and is fondly thought of by many, especially in the United States since Pluto was found by American astronomer Clyde Tombaugh, and the general public could have been alienated from professional astronomers; there was considerable uproar when the media last suggested, in 1999, that Pluto might be demoted, which was a misunderstanding of a proposal to catalog all trans-Neptunian objects uniformly.

==== Criticism ====
The proposed definition was criticised as ambiguous: Astronomer Phil Plait and NCSE writer Nick Matzke both wrote about why they thought the definition was not, in general, a good one. It defined a planet as orbiting a star, which would have meant that any planet ejected from its star system or formed outside of one (a rogue planet) could not have been called a planet, even if it fit all other criteria. However, a similar situation already applies to the term 'moon'—such bodies ceasing to be moons on being ejected from planetary orbit—and this usage has widespread acceptance. Another criticism was that the definition did not differentiate between planets and brown dwarf stars. Any attempt to clarify this differentiation was to be left until a later date.

There had also been criticism of the proposed definition of double planet: at present the Moon is defined as a satellite of the Earth, but over time the Earth–Moon barycenter will drift outwards (see tidal acceleration) and could eventually become situated outside of both bodies. This development would then upgrade the Moon to planetary status at that time, according to the definition. The time taken for this to occur, however, would be billions of years, long after many astronomers expect the Sun to expand into a red giant and destroy both Earth and Moon.

In an 18 August 2006 Science Friday interview, Mike Brown expressed doubt that a scientific definition was even necessary. He stated, "The analogy that I always like to use is the word "continent". You know, the word "continent" has no scientific definition ... they're just cultural definitions, and I think the geologists are wise to leave that one alone and not try to redefine things so that the word "continent" has a big, strict definition."

On 18 August, Owen Gingerich said that correspondence he had received had been evenly divided for and against the proposal.

=== Alternative proposal ===
According to Alan Boss of the Carnegie Institution of Washington, a subgroup of the IAU met on August 18, 2006, and held a straw poll on the draft proposal: Only 18 were in favour of it, with over 50 against. The 50 in opposition preferred an alternative proposal drawn up by Uruguayan astronomers Gonzalo Tancredi and Julio Ángel Fernández.

(1) A planet is a celestial body that (a) is by far the largest object in its local population[1], (b) has sufficient mass for its self-gravity to overcome rigid body forces so that it assumes a hydrostatic equilibrium (nearly round) shape [2], and (c) does not produce energy by any nuclear fusion mechanism [3].

(2) According to point (1), the eight classical planets discovered before 1900, which move in nearly circular orbits close to the ecliptic plane, are the only planets of the Solar System. All the other objects in orbit around the Sun are smaller than Mercury. We recognize that there are objects that fulfill the criteria (b) and (c) but not criterion (a). Those objects are defined as "dwarf" planets. Ceres, as well as Pluto and several other large Trans-Neptunian objects, belongs to this category. In contrast to the planets, these objects typically have highly inclined orbits and/or large eccentricities.

(3) All the other natural objects orbiting the Sun that do not fulfill any of the previous criteria shall be referred to collectively as "Small Solar System Bodies".[4]

Definitions and clarifications

1. The local population is the collection of objects that cross or closely approach the orbit of the body in consideration.
2. This generally applies to objects with sizes above several hundred kilometers, depending on the material strength.
3. This criterion allows the distinction between gas giant planets and brown dwarfs or stars.
4. This class currently includes most of the Solar System asteroids, Near-Earth objects (NEOs), Mars-, Jupiter- and Neptune-Trojan asteroids, most Centaurs, most Trans-Neptunian Objects (TNOs), and comets.

Under this proposal, Pluto was demoted to a dwarf planet.

=== Revised draft proposal ===
On 22 August 2006 the draft proposal was rewritten with two changes from the previous draft. The first was a generalisation of the name of the new class of planets (previously the draft resolution had explicitly opted for the term pluton), with a decision on the name to be used postponed. Many geologists had been critical of the choice of name for Pluto-like planets, being concerned about the term pluton, which has been used for years within the geological community to represent a form of magmatic intrusion; such formations are fairly common balls of rock. Confusion was thought undesirable due to the status of planetology as a field closely allied to geology. Further concerns surrounded use of the word pluton as in major languages such as French and Spanish, Pluto is itself called Pluton, potentially adding to confusion.

The second change was a redrawing of the planetary definition in the case of a double planet system. There had been a concern that, in extreme cases where a double body had its secondary component in a highly eccentric orbit, there could have been a drift of the barycenter in and out of the primary body, leading to a shift in the classification of the secondary body between satellite and planet depending on where the system was in its orbit. Thus the definition was reformulated so as to consider a double planet system in existence if its barycenter lay outside both bodies for a majority of the system's orbital period.

Later on August 22, two open meetings were held which ended in an abrupt about-face on the basic planetary definition. The position of astronomer Julio Ángel Fernández gained the upper hand among the members attending and was described as unlikely to lose its hold by August 24. This position would result in only eight major planets, with Pluto ranking as a "dwarf planet". The discussion at the first meeting was heated and lively, with IAU members in vocal disagreement with one another over such issues as the relative merits of static and dynamic physics; the main sticking point was whether or not to include a body's orbital characteristics among the definition criteria. In an indicative vote, members heavily defeated the proposals on Pluto-like objects and double planet systems, and were evenly divided on the question of hydrostatic equilibrium. The debate was said to be "still open", with private meetings being held ahead of a vote scheduled for the following day.

At the second meeting of the day, following "secret" negotiations, a compromise began to emerge after the Executive Committee moved explicitly to exclude consideration of extra-solar planets and to bring into the definition a criterion concerning the dominance of a body in its neighbourhood.

=== Final draft proposal ===
Illustration of the final proposal

The final, third draft definition proposed on 24 August 2006 read:

The IAU...resolves that planets and other bodies in the Solar System be defined into three distinct categories in the following way:

(1) A planet [1] is a celestial body that (a) is in orbit around the Sun, (b) has sufficient mass for its self-gravity to overcome rigid body forces so that it assumes a hydrostatic equilibrium (nearly round) shape, and (c) has cleared the neighbourhood around its orbit.

(2) A "dwarf planet" is a celestial body that (a) is in orbit around the Sun, (b) has sufficient mass for its self-gravity to overcome rigid body forces so that it assumes a hydrostatic equilibrium (nearly round) shape [2], (c) has not cleared the neighbourhood around its orbit, and (d) is not a satellite.

(3) All other objects [3] orbiting the Sun shall be referred to collectively as "Small Solar System Bodies".

[1] The eight planets are: Mercury, Venus, Earth, Mars, Jupiter, Saturn, Uranus, and Neptune.

[2] An IAU process will be established to assign borderline objects into either dwarf planet and other categories.

[3] These currently include most of the Solar System asteroids, most Trans-Neptunian Objects (TNOs), comets, and other small bodies.

==== Plenary session debate ====
Voting on the definition took place at the Assembly plenary session during the afternoon. Following a reversion to the previous rules on 15 August, as a planetary definition is a primarily scientific matter, every individual member of the Union attending the Assembly was eligible to vote. The plenary session was chaired by astronomer Jocelyn Bell Burnell. During this session, IAU members cast votes on each resolution by raising yellow cards. A team of students counted the votes in each section of the auditorium, and astronomer Virginia Trimble compiled and tallied the vote counts.

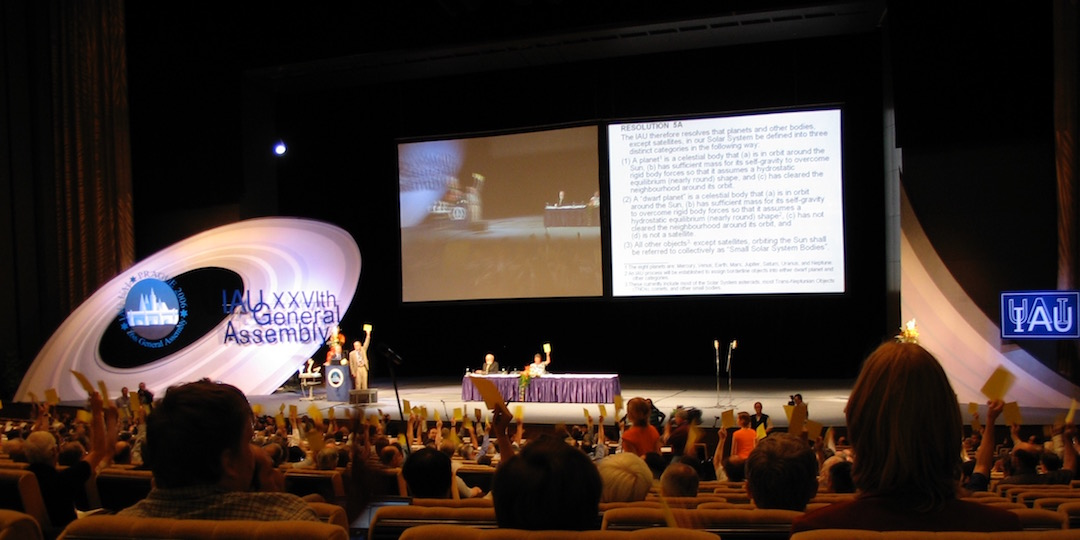
Plenary session of the IAU General Assembly on August 24, 2006. Votes were cast by raising yellow cards.

The IAU Executive Committee presented four Resolutions to the Assembly, each concerning a different aspect of the debate over the definition. Minor amendments were made on the floor for the purposes of clarification.

- Resolution 5A constituted the definition itself as stated above. There was much discussion among members about the appropriateness of using the expression "cleared the neighbourhood" instead of the earlier reference to "dominant body", and about the implications of the definition for satellites. The Resolution was ultimately approved by a near-unanimous vote.
- Resolution 5B sought to amend the above definition by the insertion of the word classical before the word planet in paragraph (1) and footnote [1]. This represented a choice between having a set of three distinct categories of body (planet, "dwarf planet" and SSSB) and the opening of an umbrella of 'planets' over the first two such categories. The Resolution proposed the latter option; it was defeated convincingly, with only 91 members voting in its favour.
- Resolution 6A proposed a statement concerning Pluto: "Pluto is a dwarf planet by the above definition and is recognized as the prototype of a new category of trans-Neptunian objects." After a little quibbling over the grammar involved and questions of exactly what constituted a "trans-Neptunian object", the Resolution was approved by a vote of 237–157, with 30 abstentions. A new category of dwarf planet was thus established. It would be named "plutoid" and more narrowly defined by the IAU Executive Committee on 11 June 2008.
- Resolution 6B sought to insert an additional sentence at the end of the statement in 6A: "This category is to be called 'plutonian objects'." There was no debate on the question, and in the vote the proposed name was defeated by 186–183; a proposal to conduct a re-vote was rejected. An IAU process was then to be put in motion to determine the name for the new category.

On a literal reading of the Resolution, "dwarf planets" are by implication of paragraph (1) excluded from the status of "planet". Use of the word planet in their title may, however, cause some ambiguity.

== Final definition ==
The final definition, as passed on 24 August 2006 under the Resolution 5A of the 26th General Assembly, is:

Illustration of the outcome of the vote

The IAU...resolves that planets and other bodies, except satellites, in the Solar System be defined into three distinct categories in the following way:

(1) A planet [1] is a celestial body that (a) is in orbit around the Sun, (b) has sufficient mass for its self-gravity to overcome rigid body forces so that it assumes a hydrostatic equilibrium (nearly round) shape, and (c) has cleared the neighbourhood around its orbit.

(2) A "dwarf planet" is a celestial body that (a) is in orbit around the Sun, (b) has sufficient mass for its self-gravity to overcome rigid body forces so that it assumes a hydrostatic equilibrium (nearly round) shape [2], (c) has not cleared the neighbourhood around its orbit, and (d) is not a satellite.

(3) All other objects [3], except satellites, orbiting the Sun shall be referred to collectively as "Small Solar System Bodies".

Footnotes:

[1] The eight planets are: Mercury, Venus, Earth, Mars, Jupiter, Saturn, Uranus, and Neptune.
[2] An IAU process will be established to assign borderline objects into either dwarf planet and other categories.

[3] These currently include most of the Solar System asteroids, most Trans-Neptunian Objects (TNOs), comets, and other small bodies.

The IAU further resolves:

Pluto is a "dwarf planet" by the above definition and is recognized as the prototype of a new category of Trans-Neptunian Objects[1].

Footnote:

[1] An IAU process will be established to select a name for this category.

The IAU also resolved that "planets and dwarf planets are two distinct classes of objects", meaning that dwarf planets, despite their name, would not be considered planets.

== Closing issues ==
=== Substance ===
Alan Stern, the lead scientist on NASA's robotic mission to Pluto, contended that Earth, Mars, Jupiter, and Neptune have not fully cleared their orbital zones, just like Pluto. Earth orbits with 10,000 near-Earth asteroids. Jupiter, meanwhile, is accompanied by 100,000 Trojan asteroids on its orbital path. Stern has asserted: "If Neptune had cleared its zone, Pluto wouldn't be there."

Some astronomers counter this opinion by saying that, far from not having cleared their orbits, the major planets completely control the orbits of the other bodies within their orbital zone. Although Jupiter does coexist with a large number of small bodies in its orbit (the Trojan asteroids), these bodies only exist in Jupiter's orbit because they are in the sway of the planet's huge gravity. Earth accretes or ejects near-Earth asteroids on million-year time scales, thereby clearing its orbit. Similarly, Pluto may cross the orbit of Neptune, but Neptune long ago locked Pluto and its attendant Kuiper belt objects, called plutinos, into a 3:2 resonance (i.e., they orbit the Sun twice for every three Neptune orbits). Since the orbits of these objects are entirely dictated by Neptune's gravity, Neptune is therefore gravitationally dominant.

On June 11, 2008, the IAU announced that the subcategory of dwarf planets with trans-Neptunian orbits would be known as "plutoids". In an accompanying press release, the IAU said that:

Plutoids are celestial bodies in orbit around the Sun at a distance greater than that of Neptune that have sufficient mass for their self-gravity to overcome rigid body forces so that they assume a hydrostatic equilibrium (near-spherical) shape, and that have not cleared the neighbourhood around their orbit.

This subcategory includes Pluto, Haumea, Makemake and Eris.

Some aspects of the definition are as yet difficult to apply outside the Solar System. Techniques for identifying extrasolar objects generally cannot determine whether an object has "cleared its orbit", except indirectly via an orbit-clearing criterion. The wording of the 2006 definition is heliocentric in its use of the word Sun instead of star or stars, and is thus not applicable to the numerous objects which have been identified in orbit around other stars. A separate "working" definition for extrasolar planets was, however, recommended by a working group of the IAU in 2003 and includes the criterion: "The minimum mass/size required for an extrasolar object to be considered a planet should be the same as that used in the Solar System."

=== Process ===
The final vote was criticized because of the relatively small percentage of the 9000-strong IAU membership who participated. Besides the fact that most members do not attend the General Assemblies, this lack was also due to the timing of the vote: the final vote was taken on the last day of the 10-day event, after many participants had left or were preparing to leave. Many astronomers were also unable or chose not to make the trip to Prague and, thus, cast no vote. Only 424 astronomers were present for the vote, which is less than 5% of the astronomer community. However, sampling 400 representative members out of a population of 9,000 statistically yields a result with good accuracy (confidence interval better than 5%). Astronomer Marla Geha has clarified that not all members of the Union were needed to vote on the classification issue: only those whose work is directly related to planetary studies.

== Impact ==
The decision generated cultural and societal implications, affecting the "industry of astronomical artifacts and toys." Most educational books that included the definition were printed after 2006. The decision was important enough to prompt the editors of the 2007 edition of the World Book Encyclopedia to hold off printing until a final result had been reached.

=== Popular culture ===
The impact of the revised definition, particularly the change in the status of Pluto, has been reflected in popular culture. A number of musical contributions have commemorated the change:

- "Planet X" (1996), song by Christine Lavin. A good-natured protest against suggestions that Pluto is not a planet.
- "Pluto" (1998), song by 2 Skinnee J's. An impassioned defense of Pluto's status as a planet.
- Thing a Week, August 25, 2006 podcast by Jonathan Coulton. Featured a song "I'm Your Moon", from Charon's point of view, about Pluto being reclassified as a dwarf planet.
- "Bring Back Pluto" (2007), song by Aesop Rock on the album None Shall Pass. Hip-hop song supporting Pluto's status as the 9th planet in the Solar System.
- "Pluto" (2009), song by Robbie Fulks, part of his release "50-vc. Doberman." About Pluto's reclassification, remembered as a 9th planet from the times of the singer's youth, and re-presents Pluto as an unforgotten monarch of the Kuiper Belt.
- "134340 Pluto" (2014), by Cojum Dip, a song from the point of view of Pluto asking what it did to anger the IAU.
- Pluto's demotion is alluded to in "The Lonesome Friends of Science" on John Prine's The Tree of Forgiveness, in which the planets (including non-existent Vulcan) are anthropomorphized, and Pluto is "uninvited to the interplanetary dance."
- "134340" (2018), a song by BTS from album Love Yourself: Tear, feature the breakup of a sad relationship by the Pluto status as a real planet.
- "H.S" (2023), by Tom Cardy, highlights that the actual celestial body is unaffected by the naming arguments and remains impressive in its own right, and extending the metaphor to loving one's self regardless of internal doubts.

=== Plutoed ===
The verb to pluto (preterite and past participle: plutoed) was coined in the aftermath of the 2006 IAU decision. In January 2007, the American Dialect Society chose plutoed as its 2006 Word of the Year, defining to pluto as "to demote or devalue someone or something, as happened to the former planet Pluto when the General Assembly of the International Astronomical Union decided Pluto no longer met its definition of a planet."

Society president Cleveland Evans stated the reason for the organization's selection of plutoed: "Our members believe the great emotional reaction of the public to the demotion of Pluto shows the importance of Pluto as a name. We may no longer believe in the Roman god Pluto, but we still have a sense of connection with the former planet".

== See also ==
- Fusor (astronomy)
- Geophysical planet definition
- List of Solar System objects
- List of former planets
- Minor planet
- Planemo
- How I Killed Pluto and Why It Had It Coming – Memoir by astronomer Michael E. Brown about the event
