= Planetary-mass moon =

Planetary-mass bodies that are also natural satellites

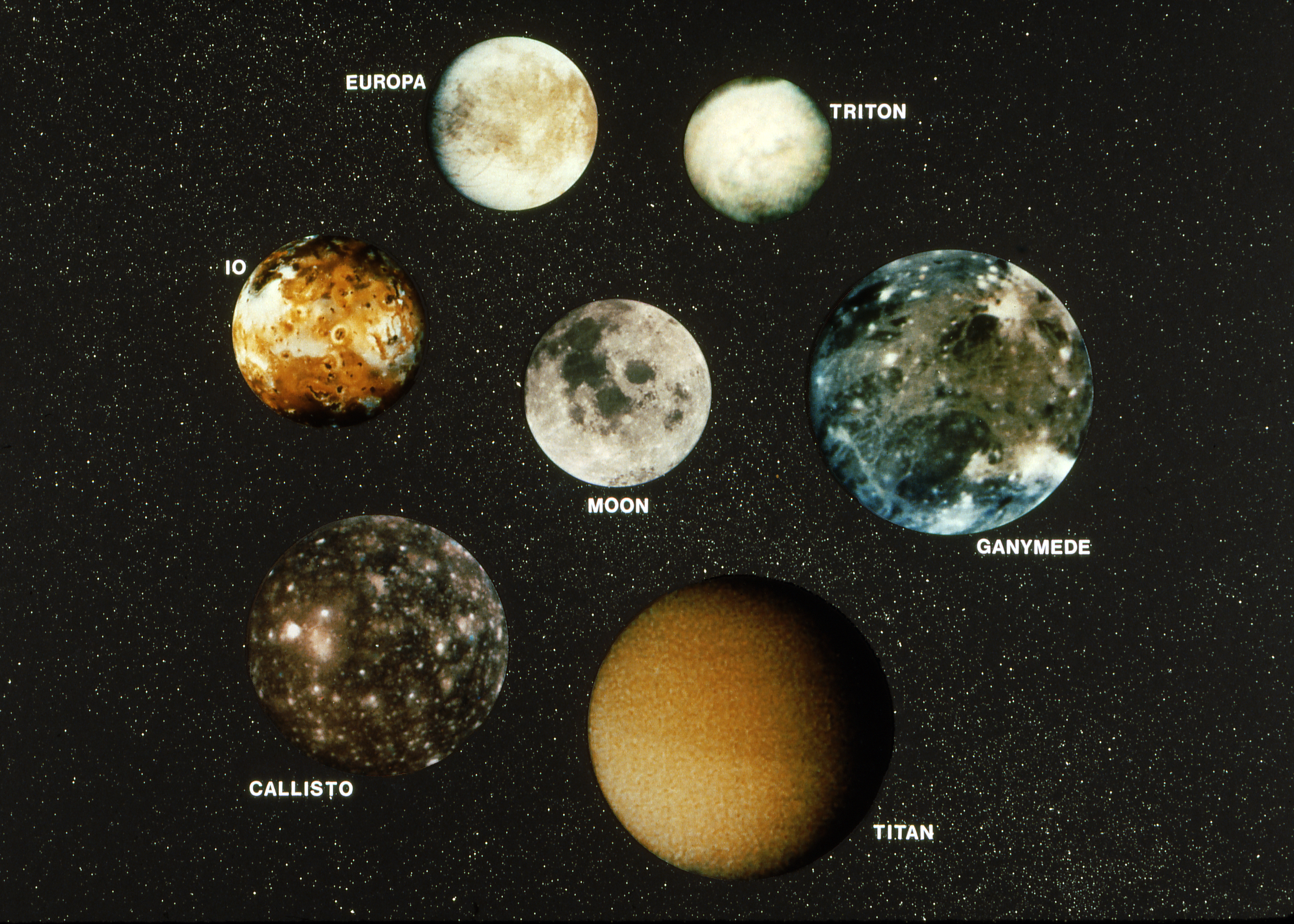
Planetary-mass moons larger than Pluto, the largest Solar dwarf planet

A planetary-mass moon is a planetary-mass object that is a natural satellite of another non-stellar celestial object. Because of their mass, these moons are large and ellipsoidal (sometimes spherical) in shape due to hydrostatic equilibrium caused by internal partial melting and differentiation and/or from tidal or radiogenic heating, in some cases forming a subsurface ocean.

Planetary-mass moons are sometimes called satellite planets by some planetary scientists such as Alan Stern, who are more concerned with whether a celestial body has planetary geology (that is, whether it is a planetary body) than its solar or non-solar orbit (planetary dynamics). Thus they consider planetary-mass moons to be a subset of the planets. This conceptualization of planets as three classes of objects (classical planets, dwarf planets and satellite planets) has not been accepted by the International Astronomical Union (the IAU).

Two moons in the Solar System, Ganymede and Titan, are larger than the terrestrial planet Mercury, and a third, Callisto, is just slightly smaller than it, although all three are less massive than Mercury. Additionally, seven moons — Ganymede, Titan, Callisto, Io, Luna (Earth's Moon), Europa, and Triton — are larger and more massive than the largest and most massive dwarf planets Pluto and Eris.

== Early history ==
The distinction between a satellite and a classical planet was not recognized until after the heliocentric model of the Solar System was established. When in 1610 Galileo discovered the first satellites of another planet (the four Galilean moons of Jupiter), he referred to them as "four planets flying around the star of Jupiter at unequal intervals and periods, with wonderful swiftness." Similarly, Christiaan Huygens, upon discovering Saturn's largest moon Titan in 1655, employed the terms "planeta" (planet), "Stella" (star), "luna" (moon), and the more modern "satellite" (attendant) to describe it. Giovanni Cassini, in announcing his discovery of Saturn's moons Iapetus and Rhea in 1671 and 1672, described them as Nouvelles Planetes autour de Saturne ("New planets around Saturn"). However, when the Journal de Scavans reported Cassini's discovery of two new Saturnian moons (Tethys and Dione) in 1686, it referred to them strictly as "satellites", though sometimes to Saturn as the "primary planet". When William Herschel announced his discovery of two objects in orbit around Uranus (Titania and Oberon) in 1787, he referred to them as "satellites" and "secondary planets". All subsequent discovery reports of natural satellite used the term "satellite" exclusively, though the 1868 book Smith's Illustrated Astronomy referred to satellites as "secondary planets".

== Modern concept ==
Comparative masses of the seven largest moons.
1. Ganymede 148.2 (23.2%)
2. Titan 134.5 (21.0%)
3. Callisto 107.6 (16.8%)
4. Io 89.32 (14.0%)
5. Moon 73.46 (11.5%)
6. Europa 48 (7.51%)
7. Triton 21.39 (3.34%)
8. [other] 17 (2.66%)
Values are ×10^{21} kg. The moons smaller than Triton would be barely visible at this scale.
The masses of the mid-sized moons, compared to Triton.
1. Triton 21.39: 54.32 (55.7%)
2. Titania 3.4: 8.64 (8.85%)
3. Oberon 3.08: 7.83 (8.02%)
4. Rhea 2.307: 5.86 (6.00%)
5. Iapetus 1.806: 4.59 (4.70%)
6. Charon 1.586: 4.03 (4.13%)
7. Umbriel 1.28: 3.25 (3.33%)
8. Ariel 1.25: 3.18 (3.26%)
9. Dione 1.095: 2.78 (2.85%)
10. Tethys 0.617: 1.57 (1.61%)
11. Dysnomia 0.4: 1.02 (1.04%)
12. Enceladus 0.108: 0.27 (0.28%)
13. Miranda 0.066: 0.17 (0.17%)
14. Mimas 0.0375: 0.1 (0.10%)
Values are ×10^{21} kg. Dysnomia is given a value at the center of its estimated range (0.3–0.5). Unmeasured Vanth and Ilmarë are excluded. Enceladus, Miranda, and Mimas are nearly invisible at this scale.

Alan Stern considers satellite planets to be one of three categories of planets, along with dwarf planets and classical planets. The term planemo ("planetary-mass object") covers all three populations. Stern's and the IAU's definition of 'planet' depends on hydrostatic equilibrium – on the body's mass being sufficient to render it plastic, so that it relaxes into an ellipsoid under its own gravity. The IAU definition specifies that the mass is great enough to overcome 'rigid-body forces', and it does not address objects that may be in hydrostatic equilibrium due to a subsurface ocean or (in the case of Io) due to magma caused by tidal heating. Many of the larger icy moons could have subsurface oceans.

The seven largest moons are more massive than the dwarf planet Pluto, which is known to be in hydrostatic equilibrium (they are also known to be more massive than Eris, a dwarf planet even more massive than Pluto). These seven are Earth's Moon, the four Galilean moons of Jupiter (Io, Europa, Ganymede and Callisto), and the largest moons of Saturn (Titan) and of Neptune (Triton). Ganymede and Titan are additionally larger than the planet Mercury, and Callisto is almost as large. All of these moons are ellipsoidal. That said, the two moons larger than Mercury have less than half its mass, and it is mass, along with composition and internal temperature, that determine whether a body is plastic enough to be in hydrostatic equilibrium. Io, Europa, Ganymede, Titan, and Triton are generally believed to be in hydrostatic equilibrium, but Earth's Moon is known not to be in hydrostatic equilibrium, and the situation for Callisto is unclear.

Another dozen moons are ellipsoidal as well, indicating that they achieved equilibrium at some point in their histories. However, it has been shown that some of these moons are no longer in equilibrium, due to them becoming increasingly rigid as they cooled over time.

Neptune's second-largest moon Proteus, (Neptune VIII) has occasionally been included by authors discussing or advocating geophysical conceptions of the 'planet'. It is larger than Mimas but is quite far from being round.

== Possible equilibrium moons ==
Determining whether a moon is currently in hydrostatic equilibrium requires close observation, and is easier to disprove than to prove.

Earth's entirely rocky moon solidified out of equilibrium billions of years ago, but most of the other six moons larger than Pluto, four of which are predominantly icy, are assumed to still be in equilibrium. (Ice has less tensile strength than rock, and is deformed at lower pressures and temperatures than rock.) The evidence is perhaps strongest for Ganymede, which has a magnetic field that indicates the fluid movement of electrically conducting material in its interior, though whether that fluid is a metallic core or a subsurface ocean is unknown. One of the mid-sized moons of Saturn (Rhea) may also be in equilibrium, as may a couple of the moons of Uranus (Titania and Oberon). However, the other ellipsoidal moons of Saturn (Mimas, Enceladus, Tethys, Dione and Iapetus) are no longer in equilibrium. In addition to not being in equilibrium, Mimas and Tethys have very low densities and it has been suggested that they may have non-negligible internal porosity, in which case they would not be satellite planets. The situation for Uranus's three smaller ellipsoidal moons (Umbriel, Ariel and Miranda) is unclear, as is that of Pluto's moon Charon.

The TNO moons Eris I Dysnomia, Orcus I Vanth, and possibly Varda I Ilmarë are at least the size of Mimas, the smallest ellipsoidal moon of Saturn. However, trans-Neptunian objects appear to become solid bodies at a larger size (around 900–1000 km diameter) than the moons of Saturn and Uranus (around 400 km diameter). Both Dysnomia and Vanth are dark bodies smaller than 900–1000 km, and Dysnomia is known to be low-density, suggesting that it cannot be solid. Consequently, these bodies have been excluded.

=== List ===
Yes – believed to be in equilibrium
No – confirmed not to be in equilibrium
– uncertain evidence

Satellites of planets
Satellites of Earth	Satellites of Jupiter	Satellites of Uranus
Satellites of Saturn	Satellites of Neptune	
Satellites of generally agreed dwarf planets
Satellites of Pluto		

List of ellipsoidal moons
Moon		Image	Radius		Mass		Density	Surface gravity	Year of discovery	Hydrostatic equilibrium?
Name	Designation	Image	(km)	(R_{☾})	(10^{21} kg)	(M_{☾})	(g/cm^{3})	(g)	Year of discovery	Hydrostatic equilibrium?
Ganymede	Jupiter III		2634.1±0.3	156.4%	148.2	201.8%	1.942±0.005	0.146	1610	Yes
Titan	Saturn VI		2574.7±0.1	148.2%	134.5	183.2%	1.88±0.001	0.138	1655	Maybe
Callisto	Jupiter IV		2410.3±1.5	138.8%	107.6	146.6%	1.834±0.003	0.126	1610	Maybe
Io	Jupiter I		1821.6±0.5	104.9%	89.3	121.7%	3.528±0.006	0.183	1610	Yes
Moon (Luna)	Earth I		1737.4	100%	73.46	100%	3.344±0.005	0.165	Prehistoric	No
Europa	Jupiter II		1560.8±0.5	89.9%	48.0	65.4%	3.013±0.005	0.134	1610	Yes
Triton	Neptune I		1353.4±0.9	79.9%	21.4	29.1%	2.059±0.005	0.080	1846	Yes
Titania	Uranus III		788.9±1.8	45.4%	3.4550±0.0509	4.6%	1.683	0.040	1787	Maybe
Rhea	Saturn V		764.3±1.0	44.0%	2.31	3.1%	1.237±0.005	0.027	1672	Maybe
Oberon	Uranus IV		761.4±2.6	43.8%	3.1104±0.0749	4.2%	1.682	0.036	1787	Maybe
Iapetus	Saturn VIII		735.6±1.5	42.3%	1.81	2.5%	1.089±0.007	0.022	1671	No
Charon	Pluto I		606±0.5	34.7%	1.58	2.1%	1.705±0.006	0.029	1978	Maybe
Umbriel	Uranus II		582.4±0.8	33.7%	1.2885±0.0225	1.7%	1.557 (Note: Calculated from radius and mass)	0.023	1851	
Ariel	Uranus I		578.9±0.6	33.3%	1.23±0.02	1.7%	1.517	0.028	1851	
Dione	Saturn IV		561.4±0.4	32.3%	1.095	1.5%	1.476±0.004	0.024	1684	No
Tethys	Saturn III		533.0±0.7	30.7%	0.617	0.84%	0.984±0.004	0.015	1684	No
Enceladus	Saturn II		252.1±0.2	14.5%	0.108	0.15%	1.608±0.003	0.011	1789	No
Miranda	Uranus V		235.8±0.7	13.6%	0.063	0.09%	1.21±0.11	0.008	1948	
Mimas	Saturn I		198.2±0.4	11.4%	0.0375	0.05%	1.150±0.004	0.006	1789	No

Methone, Pallene, and, with less certainty, Aegaeon are in hydrostatic equilibrium. However, as they are not planetary-mass objects, these are not included as planetary-mass moons.

=== Atmospheres ===
Titan has a denser atmosphere than Earth, with a surface pressure of 1.4 bar, while Triton has a relatively thinner atmosphere of 14 μbar; Titan and Triton are the only known moons to have atmospheres significant enough to drive weather and climate processes. Io (1.9 nbar) and Callisto (26 pbar) have very thin atmospheres, but still enough to have collisions between molecules and thus to be gaseous. Other planetary-mass moons only have exospheres at most. Exospheres have been detected around Earth's Moon, Europa, Ganymede, Enceladus, Dione, and Rhea. An exosphere around Titania is a possibility, though it has not been confirmed.

== See also ==
- List of gravitationally rounded objects of the Solar System
- List of Solar System objects by size
- List of natural satellites
