= Far Out =

Far Out may refer to:

- Far Out (book), a 1961 collection of science fiction stories by Damon Knight
- Far Out Recordings, a UK-based record label specializing in the music of Brazil
- Far Out (album), a 1999 album by Tadpoles
- "Far Out", a 1994 song by Blur from Parklife
- "Far Out", a 1997 song by Silver Sun from Silver Sun
- "Far Out", a 1991 song by Sonz of a Loop Da Loop Era
- Farout, a nickname for 2018 VG_{18}, a trans-Neptunian object
- Far Out Corporation, an Australian rock band

== See also ==
- FarFarOut, a temporary nickname for the distant trans-Neptunian object 2018 AG_{37}
- "Far Far Out!", a 2012 TV episode of Chopped!; see List of Chopped episodes (seasons 1–20)
