= List of Solar System objects most distant from the Sun =

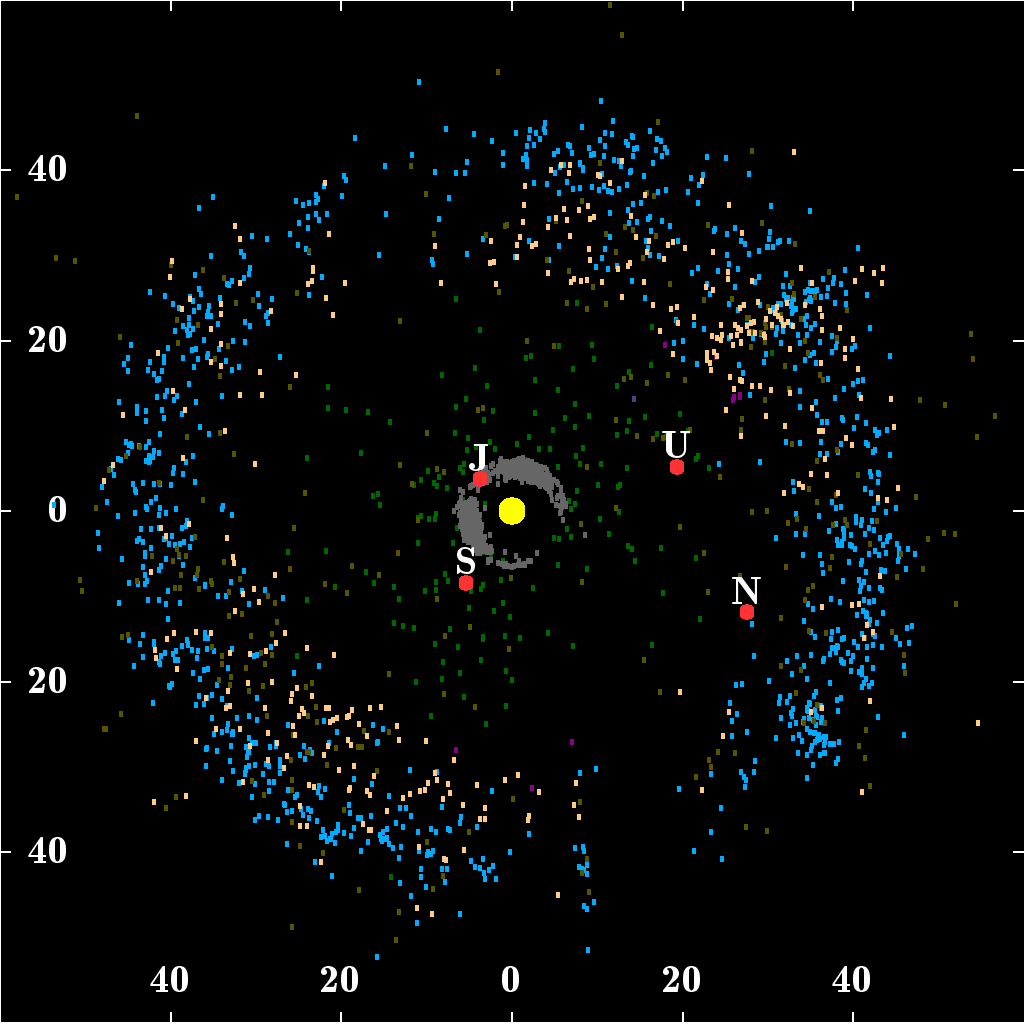
Positions of known outer Solar System objects Sun Jupiter trojans (6,178) Scattered disc (>300) Giant planets: J · S · U · N Centaurs (44,000) Kuiper belt (>1,000) (scale in AU; epoch as of January 2026; # of objects in parentheses)

These Solar System minor planets are the furthest from the Sun as of January 2026. The objects have been categorized by their approximate distance from the Sun on that date, and not by the calculated aphelion of their orbit. The list changes over time because the objects are moving in their orbits. Some objects are inbound and some are outbound. It would be difficult to detect long-distance comets if it were not for their comas, which become visible when heated by the Sun. Distances are measured in astronomical units (AU, Sun–Earth distances). The distances are not the minimum (perihelion) or the maximum (aphelion) that may be achieved by these objects in the future.

This list does not include near-parabolic comets of which many are known to be currently more than 100 AU (15 billion km) from the Sun, but are currently too far away to be observed by telescope. Trans-Neptunian objects are typically announced publicly months or years after their discovery, so as to make sure the orbit is correct before announcing it. Due to their greater distance from the Sun and slow movement across the sky, trans-Neptunian objects with observation arcs less than several years often have poorly constrained orbits. Particularly distant objects take several years of observations to establish a crude orbit solution before being announced. For instance, the most distant known trans-Neptunian object 2018 AG37 was discovered by Scott Sheppard in January 2018 but was announced three years later in February 2021.

== Notable objects ==
One particularly distant body is 90377 Sedna, which was discovered in November 2003. It has an extremely eccentric orbit that takes it to an aphelion of 937 AU. It takes over 10,000 years to orbit, and during the next 50 years it will slowly move closer to the Sun as it comes to perihelion at a distance of 76 AU from the Sun. Sedna is the largest known sednoid, a class of objects that play an important role in the Planet Nine hypothesis. The discovery of 2017 OF_{201} challenges the existence of the hypothetical Planet Nine as its orbit is anti-aligned to the calculated orbit of Planet Nine. It is suggested that the hypothetical planet would have ejected 2017 OF_{201} from its present-day orbit over times scales of less than 100 million years, though it could be in a temporary orbit.

Pluto (30–49 AU, about 34 AU in 2015) was the first Kuiper belt object to be discovered (1930) and is the largest known dwarf planet.

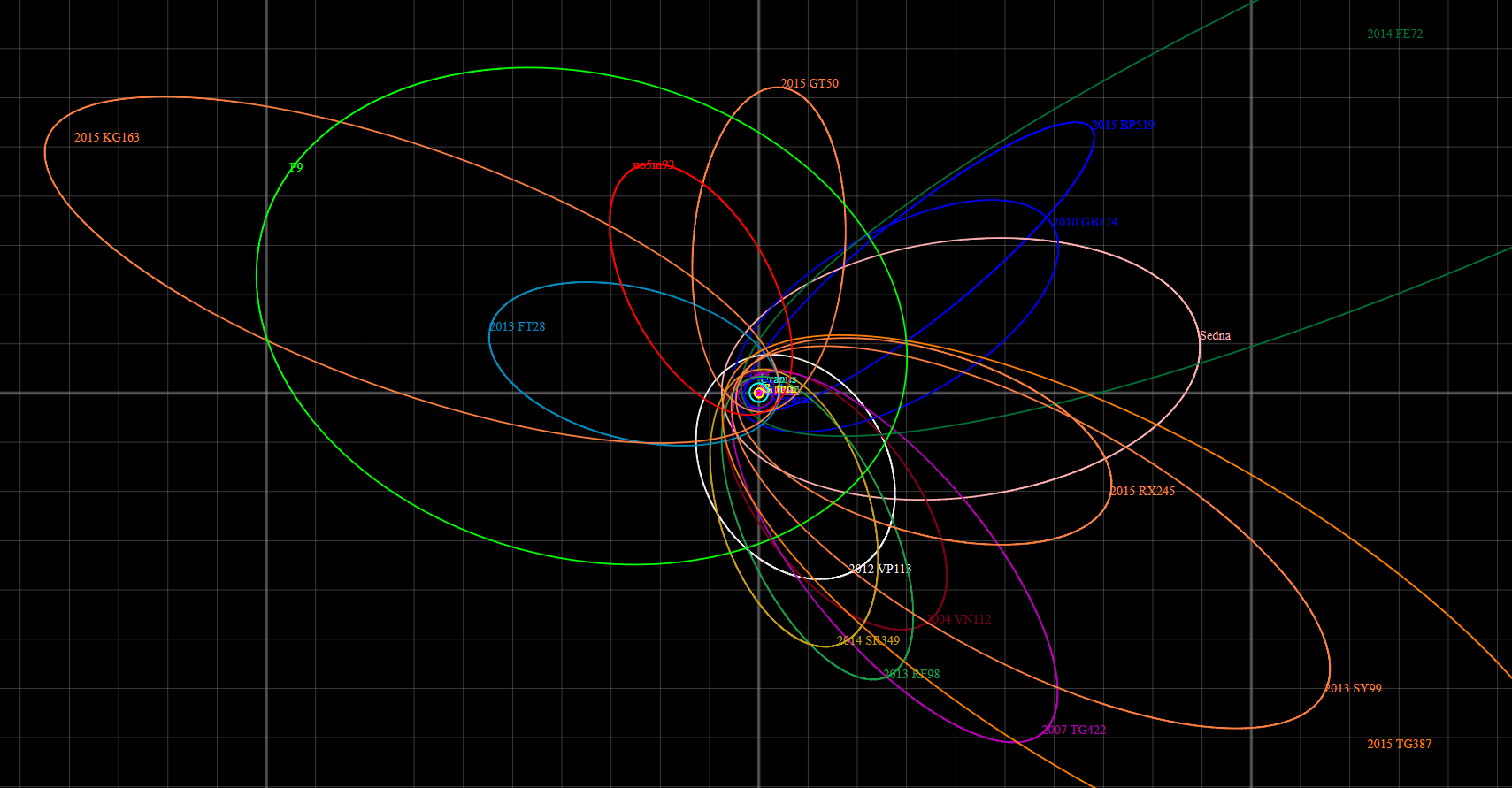
Six original and ten additional ETNO objects orbits with their positions near their perihelion in purple, with hypothetical Planet Nine orbit in green

== Gallery ==
Notable trans-Neptunian objects

Gemini North telescope's images of 2018 AG37, the farthest known Solar System object as of 2025

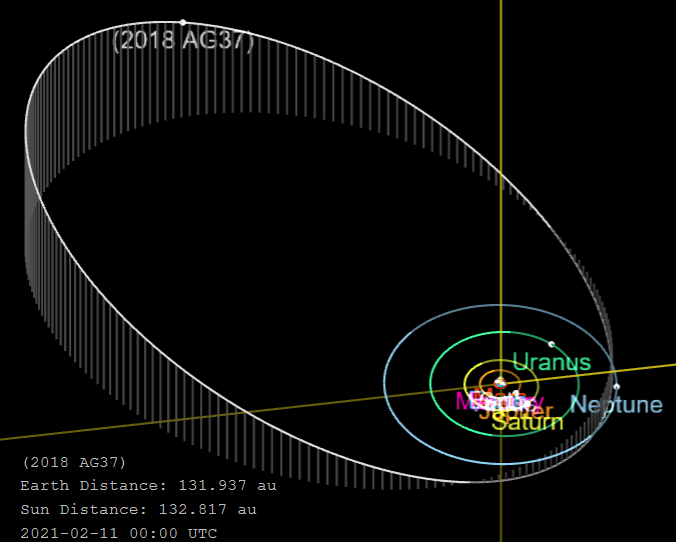
Diagram of 2018 AG_{37}'s orbit, showing its location at aphelion

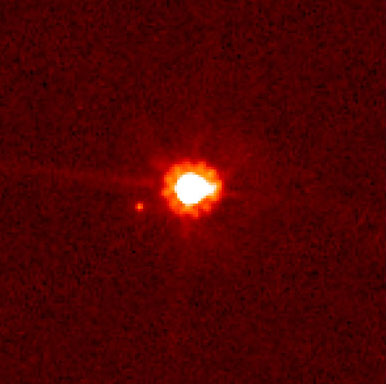
Eris and its moon Dysnomia as viewed with the Hubble Space Telescope, 2007

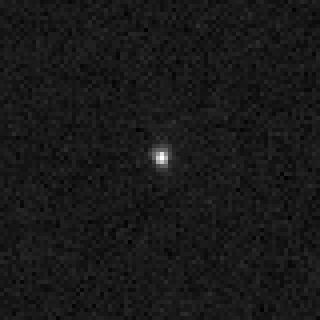
Sedna viewed with the Hubble Space Telescope, 2004

== Known distant objects ==
This is a list of known objects at heliocentric distances of more than 80 AU. In theory, the Oort cloud could extend over 120,000 AU (2 ly) from the Sun.

Most distant observable objects in the Solar System (distances in January 2026)
Object name	Distance from the Sun (AU)		Radial velocity (AU/yr) (Note: AU/yr indicates whether the object is moving inwards or outwards in its orbit, and the rate at which it does so.)	Perihelion	Aphelion	Semi-major axis	Apparent magnitude	Absolute magnitude (H)	Discovery date	Ref.
Object name	January 2026	At discovery date	Radial velocity (AU/yr)	Perihelion	Aphelion	Semi-major axis	Apparent magnitude	Absolute magnitude (H)	Discovery date	Ref.
Great Comet of 1680 (for comparison)	262.2	1.16	+0.47	0.006	889	444	—N/a	—N/a	1680-11-14	
Voyager 1 (for comparison)	169.2	—N/a	+3.56	8.79	∞ Hyperbolic	−3.22	—N/a	—N/a	—N/a	
Voyager 2 (for comparison)	141.7	—N/a	+3.17	21.3	∞ Hyperbolic	−4.03	—N/a	—N/a	—N/a	
Pioneer 10 (for comparison)	140.1	—N/a	+2.50	5.06	∞ Hyperbolic	−6.94	—N/a	—N/a	—N/a	
2018 AG37 (Note: Distance and orbital elements are crudely estimated based on a short observation arc.)	132.4	132.6	+0.03	27.1	145.0	86.0	25.4	4.2	2018-01-15	
2018 VG18	123.9	123.4	+0.05	37.8	123.9	81.3	24.6	3.7	2018-11-10	
Heliopause (for comparison)	~120									
Pioneer 11 (for comparison)	116.2	—N/a	+2.33	9.35	∞ Hyperbolic	−8.14	—N/a	—N/a	—N/a	
2020 BE_{102}	110.3	111.2	−0.15	32.9	116.9	74.9	25.6	5.1	2020-01-24	
2020 FY_{30}	98.4	99.2	−0.13	35.6	107.7	71.6	24.8	4.7	2020-03-24	
2020 FA_{31}	98.0	97.1	+0.15	39.5	102.4	71.0	25.4	5.4	2020-03-24	
Eris 136199	95.5	97.0	−0.09	38.3	97.5	67.9	18.8	−1.2	2003-10-21	
2020 FQ_{40}	92.2	92.5	−0.05	38.2	93.1	65.6	25.7	6.1	2020-03-24	
2015 TH367	92.0	88.2	+0.36	28.9	136.4	82.6	26.3	6.6	2015-10-13	
2017 OF201	91.0	85.6	+0.63	44.9	1630	840	22.8	3.5	2017-07-23	
2021 DR15	90.2	89.4	+0.16	37.8	96.5	67.2	23.1	3.6	2021-02-17	
Gonggong 225088	89.7	85.4	+0.21	33.7	101.2	67.5	21.5	1.6	2007-07-17	
2014 UZ224	87.4	92.5	−0.46	38.3	177.0	107.6	23.2	3.4	2014-10-21	
2015 FG_{415}	86.6	88.0	−0.15	36.2	92.1	64.1	25.5	6.0	2015-03-17	
2014 FC69	86.7	83.7	+0.25	40.4	104.4	72.4	24.2	4.6	2014-03-25	
2006 QH181	85.1	82.9	+0.18	37.5	96.7	67.1	23.7	4.3	2006-08-21	
Sedna 90377	83.0	89.6	−0.26	76.2	937	484.4	21.0	1.3	2003-11-14	
2015 VO_{166}	85.7	82.5	+0.30	38.3	113.2	75.8	25.5	5.9	2015-11-06	
2012 VP113	85.0	82.9	+0.18	80.4	462	271.2	23.3	4.0	2012-11-05	
2017 SN_{132}	84.8	81.2	+0.43	42.0	110.0	76.0	25.2	5.8	2017-09-16	
2015 TJ_{367}	81.3	77.0	+0.41	33.6	128.4	81.0	25.8	6.7	2015-10-13	
2013 FS28	80.8	87.9	−0.56	34.2	358.2	196.2	24.3	4.9	2013-03-16	
2021 DP_{15}	80.2	79.4	+0.16	36.2	86.1	61.1	24.9	5.9	2021-02-16	
2015 UH_{87}	80.2	82.4	−0.22	34.3	90.0	62.2	25.2	6.0	2015-10-16	
1I/ʻOumuamua (for comparison)	50.4	1.21	+5.70	0.256	∞ Hyperbolic	−1.27	39	22.1	2017-10-19	
This table includes all observable objects located at least 80 AU from the Sun on 1 January 2026.

== See also ==
- List of artificial objects leaving the Solar System
- Lists of astronomical objects
- List of Solar System objects by greatest aphelion
- List of parabolic and hyperbolic comets
- List of trans-Neptunian objects
