= Eris (dwarf planet) =

Most massive dwarf planet

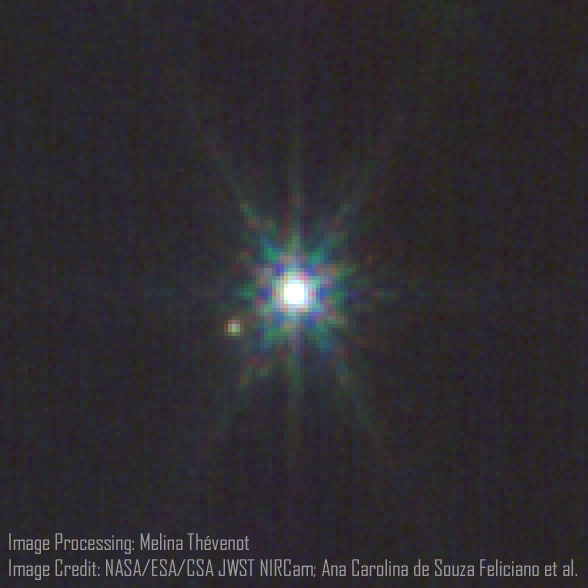
- Low-resolution image of Eris and Dysnomia as imaged by the James Webb Space Telescope's NIRCam on 23 August 2024

Discovery
- Discovered by: M. E. Brown; C. A. Trujillo; D. L. Rabinowitz
- Discovery date: January 5, 2005

Designations
- Pronunciation: /ˈɛrɪs/, /ˈɪərɪs/
- Named after: Ἔρις Eris
- Alternative designations: (136199) Eris; 2003 UB_{313} "Xena" (nickname)
- Minor planet category: Dwarf planet; TNO; SDO; Binary
- Adjectives: Eridian /ɛˈrɪdiən/
- Symbol: (mostly astrological)

Orbital characteristics
- Epoch November 21, 2025 (JD 2461000.5)
- Observation arc: 71.08 yr (25,963 d)
- Earliest precovery date: September 3, 1954
- Aphelion: 97.49 AU (14.584 billion km)
- Perihelion: 38.1 AU (5.700 billion km)
- Semi-major axis: 67.69 AU (10.126 Tm)
- Eccentricity: 0.44
- Orbital period (sidereal): 560.7 yr 558.4 years (barycentric) (Note: The heliocentric orbital period of an eccentric orbit like Eris can change quite notably over the 12-year orbit of Jupiter. Barycentric orbits, that use a Sun+Jupiter center-point, are more stable and give a better one-size fits all solution.)
- Average orbital speed: 3.4 km/s
- Mean anomaly: 205.11°
- Mean motion: 0° 0^{m} 6.372^{s} / day
- Inclination: 44.18°
- Longitude of ascending node: 36.02°
- Time of perihelion: December 6, 2257
- Argument of perihelion: 151.66°
- Known satellites: 1 confirmed (Dysnomia)

Physical characteristics
- Mean diameter: 2326±12 km
- Mean radius: 1163±6 km
- Surface area: (1.70±0.02)×10^{7} km^{2} (Note: Calculated from the mean radius)
- Volume: (6.59±0.10)×10^{9} km^{3}
- Mass: (1.6466±0.0085)×10^{22} kg (system); (1.638±0.014)×10^{22} kg (Eris only) (Note: The mass of Eris by itself is the difference between the mass of the system ((1.6466±0.0085)×10^{22} kg) and mass of Dysnomia by itself ((8.2±5.7)×10^{19} kg).); 0.0027 Earths; 0.22 Moons
- Mean density: 2.43±0.05 g/cm^{3}
- Equatorial surface gravity: 0.82±0.02 m/s^{2} 0.084±0.002 g (Note: Calculated based on the known parameters)
- Equatorial escape velocity: 1.38 ± 0.01 km/s
- Sidereal rotation period: 15.786 d (synchronous)
- Axial tilt: ≈ 78.3° to orbit (assumed) (Note: Assumed axial tilt if Eris rotates in the same plane as Dysnomia's orbit, which is tilted 78.29° with respect to Eris's orbit.) ≈ 61.6° to ecliptic (assumed) (Note: Holler et al. (2021) determined an ecliptic latitude of β = 28.41° for the north pole of Dysnomia's orbit, which is assumed to be similarly oriented as Eris's rotational north pole. β is the angular offset from the ecliptic plane, whereas inclination i with respect to the ecliptic is the angular offset from the ecliptic north pole at β = +90° ; i with respect to the ecliptic would be the complement of β. Therefore, given β = 28.41° , i = 90° – (28.41°) = 61.59° from the ecliptic.)
- Geometric albedo: 0.96+0.09 −0.04 [sic] (geometric); 0.99+0.01 −0.09 (Bond)
Surface temp.	min	mean	max
(approx)	30 K	42 K	56 K
- Spectral type: B−V=0.78, V−R=0.45
- Apparent magnitude: 18.7
- Absolute magnitude (H): –1.26
- Angular diameter: 34.4±1.4 milli-arcsec

Eris (minor-planet number 136199) is the most massive and second-largest-known dwarf planet in the Solar System. It is a trans-Neptunian object (TNO) in the scattered disk and has a high-eccentricity orbit. Eris was discovered in January 2005 by a Palomar Observatory–based team led by Mike Brown and verified later that year. It was named in September 2006 after the Greco-Roman goddess of strife and discord. Eris is the ninth-most massive known object orbiting the Sun and the sixteenth-most massive in the Solar System (counting moons). It is also the largest-known object in the Solar System that has not been visited by a spacecraft. Eris has been measured at 2,326 ± 12 kilometres (1,445 ± 7 mi) in diameter; its mass is 0.28% that of the Earth and 27% greater than that of Pluto, although Pluto is slightly larger by volume. Both Eris and Pluto have a surface area that is comparable to that of Russia or South America.

Eris has one large confirmed moon, Dysnomia, and it may have another much larger one. In February 2016, Eris's distance from the Sun was 96.3 AU (14.41 billion km; 8.95 billion mi), more than three times that of Neptune or Pluto. With the exception of long-period comets, Eris and Dysnomia were the most distant known natural objects in the Solar System until the discovery of 2018 AG37 and 2018 VG18 in 2018.

Because Eris appeared to be larger than Pluto, NASA initially described it as the Solar System's tenth planet. This, along with the prospect of other objects of similar size being discovered in the future, motivated the International Astronomical Union (IAU) to define the term planet for the first time. Under the IAU definition approved on August 24, 2006, Eris, Pluto and Ceres are "dwarf planets", reducing the number of known planets in the Solar System to eight, the same as before Pluto's discovery in 1930. Observations of a stellar occultation by Eris in 2010 showed that it was slightly smaller than Pluto, which was measured by New Horizons as having a mean diameter of 2,377 ± 2 kilometres (1,477 ± 1 mi) in July 2015.

== Discovery ==
Eris was discovered by the team of Mike Brown, Chad Trujillo and David Rabinowitz on January 5, 2005, from images taken on October 21, 2003. The discovery was announced on July 29, 2005, the same day as Makemake and two days after Haumea, due in part to events that would later lead to controversy about Haumea. The search team had been systematically scanning for large outer Solar System bodies for several years, and had been involved in the discovery of several other large TNOs, including the dwarf planets Quaoar, Orcus and Sedna.

Routine observations were taken by the team on October 21, 2003, using the 1.2 m Samuel Oschin Schmidt telescope at Palomar Observatory, California, but the image of Eris was not discovered at that point due to its very slow motion across the sky: The team's automatic image-searching software excluded all objects moving at less than 1.5 arcseconds per hour to reduce the number of false positives returned. When Sedna was discovered in 2003, it was moving at 1.75 arcsec/h, and in light of that the team reanalyzed their old data with a lower limit on the angular motion, sorting through the previously excluded images by eye. In January 2005, the re-analysis revealed Eris's slow orbital motion against the background stars.

Follow-up observations were then carried out to make a preliminary determination of Eris's orbit, which allowed the object's distance to be estimated. The team had planned to delay announcing their discoveries of the bright objects Eris and Makemake until further observations and calculations were complete, but announced them both on July 29 when the discovery of another large TNO they had been tracking—Haumea—was controversially announced on July 27 by a different team in Spain.

Precovery images of Eris have been identified back to September 3, 1954.

More observations released in October 2005 revealed that Eris has a moon, later named Dysnomia. Observations of Dysnomia's orbit permitted scientists to determine the mass of Eris, which in June 2007 was calculated to be (1.66±0.02)×10^{22} kg, 27%±2% greater than Pluto's.

== Name ==
Eris is named after the Greek goddess Eris (Greek Ἔρις), a personification of strife and discord. The name was proposed by the Caltech team on September 6, 2006, and it was assigned on September 13, 2006, following an unusually long period in which the object was known by the provisional designation 2003 UB_{313}, which was granted automatically by the IAU under their naming protocols for minor planets.

The name Eris has two competing pronunciations, with a "long" or with a "short" e, analogous to the two competing pronunciations of the word era. Perhaps the more common form in English, used i.a. by Brown and his students, is /ˈɛrɪs/ with disyllabic laxing and a short e. However, the classical English pronunciation of the goddess is /ˈɪərɪs/, with a long e.

The Greek and Latin oblique stem of the name is Erid-, as can be seen in Italian Eride and Russian Эрида Erida, so the adjective in English is Eridian /ɛˈrɪdiən/.

=== Xena ===
Due to uncertainty over whether the object would be classified as a planet or a minor planet, because varying nomenclature procedures apply to these classes of objects, the decision on what to name the object had to wait until after the August 24, 2006, IAU ruling. For a period of time, the object became known to the wider public as Xena. "Xena" was an informal name used internally by the discovery team, inspired by the title character of the television series Xena: Warrior Princess. The discovery team had reportedly saved the nickname "Xena" for the first body they discovered that was larger than Pluto. According to Brown,

We chose it since it started with an X (planet "X"), it sounds mythological ... and we've been working to get more female deities out there (e.g. Sedna). Also, at the time, the TV show was still on TV, which shows you how long we've been searching!

Brown said in an interview that the naming process was stalled:

One reporter [Ken Chang] called me up from The New York Times who happened to have been a friend of mine from college, [and] ... asked me, "What's the name you guys proposed?" and I said, "Well, I'm not going to tell." And he said, "Well, what do you guys call it when you're just talking amongst yourselves?" ... As far as I remember this was the only time I told anybody this in the press, and then it got everywhere, which I only sorta felt bad about; I kinda like the name.

=== Choosing an official name ===
Animation showing the movement of Eris on the images used to discover it. Eris is indicated by the arrow. The three frames were taken over a period of three hours.

According to science writer Govert Schilling, Brown initially wanted to call the object "Lila", after a concept in Hindu mythology that described the cosmos as the outcome of a game played by Brahman. The name would be pronounced the same as "Lilah", the name of Brown's newborn daughter. Brown was mindful of not making his name public before it had been officially accepted. He had done so with Sedna a year previously, and had been heavily criticized. However, no objection was raised to the Sedna name other than the breach of protocol, and no competing names were suggested.

He listed the address of his personal web page announcing the discovery as /~mbrown/planetlila and in the chaos following the controversy over the discovery of Haumea, forgot to change it. Rather than needlessly anger more of his fellow astronomers, he simply said that the webpage had been named for his daughter and dropped "Lila" from consideration.

Brown had also considered Persephone, the wife of the god Pluto, as a name for the object. The name had been used several times for planets in science fiction and was popular with the public, having handily won a poll conducted by New Scientist magazine. ("Xena", despite only being a nickname, came fourth.) This choice was not possible because there was already a minor planet with that name, 399 Persephone, and Eris was being named as a minor planet.

The discovery team proposed Eris on September 6, 2006. Brown decided that, because the object had been considered a planet for so long, it deserved a name from Greek or Roman mythology like the other planets. The asteroids had taken the vast majority of Graeco-Roman names. Eris, whom Brown described as his favorite goddess, had fortunately escaped inclusion. "Eris caused strife and discord by causing quarrels among people," said Brown in 2006, "and that's what this one has done too." The name was accepted by the IAU on September 13, 2006.

Although the usage of planetary symbols is generally discouraged in astronomy, NASA has used the Hand of Eris, ⟨⟩ (U+2BF0), for Eris. This symbol was taken from Discordianism, a religion concerned with the goddess Eris. The Sternberg Astronomical Institute at Moscow State University has used (U+24C0), presumably either the "all rights reversed" symbol of the Principia Discordia or a simplification of the Apple of Discord inscribed with the Greek word Kallisti,, which had been suggested as a symbol for the dwarf planet on the Discordian discussion board that eventually settled on ⟨⟩. Most astrologers use the Hand of Eris, though other symbols are occasionally seen, such as ⟨⟩ (U+2BF1).

== Classification ==
Eris is a trans-Neptunian dwarf planet. Its orbital characteristics more specifically categorize it as a scattered-disk object (SDO), or a TNO that has been "scattered" from the Kuiper belt into more-distant and unusual orbits following gravitational interactions with Neptune as the Solar System was forming. Although its high orbital inclination is unusual among the known SDOs, theoretical models suggest that objects that were originally near the inner edge of the Kuiper belt were scattered into orbits with higher inclinations than objects from the outer belt.

Because Eris was initially thought to be larger than Pluto, it was described as the "tenth planet" by NASA and in media reports of its discovery. In response to the uncertainty over its status, and because of ongoing debate over whether Pluto should be classified as a planet, the IAU delegated a group of astronomers to develop a sufficiently precise definition of the term planet to decide the issue. This was announced as the IAU's Definition of a Planet in the Solar System, adopted on August 24, 2006. At this time, both Eris and Pluto were classified as dwarf planets, a category distinct from the new definition of planet. Brown has since stated his approval of this classification. The IAU subsequently added Eris to its Minor Planet Catalogue, designating it (136199) Eris.

== Orbit ==
The orbit of Eris (blue) compared to those of Saturn, Uranus, Neptune and Pluto (white/gray). The arcs below the ecliptic are plotted in darker colors, and the red dot is the Sun. The diagram on the left is a polar view whereas the diagrams on the right are different views from the ecliptic.

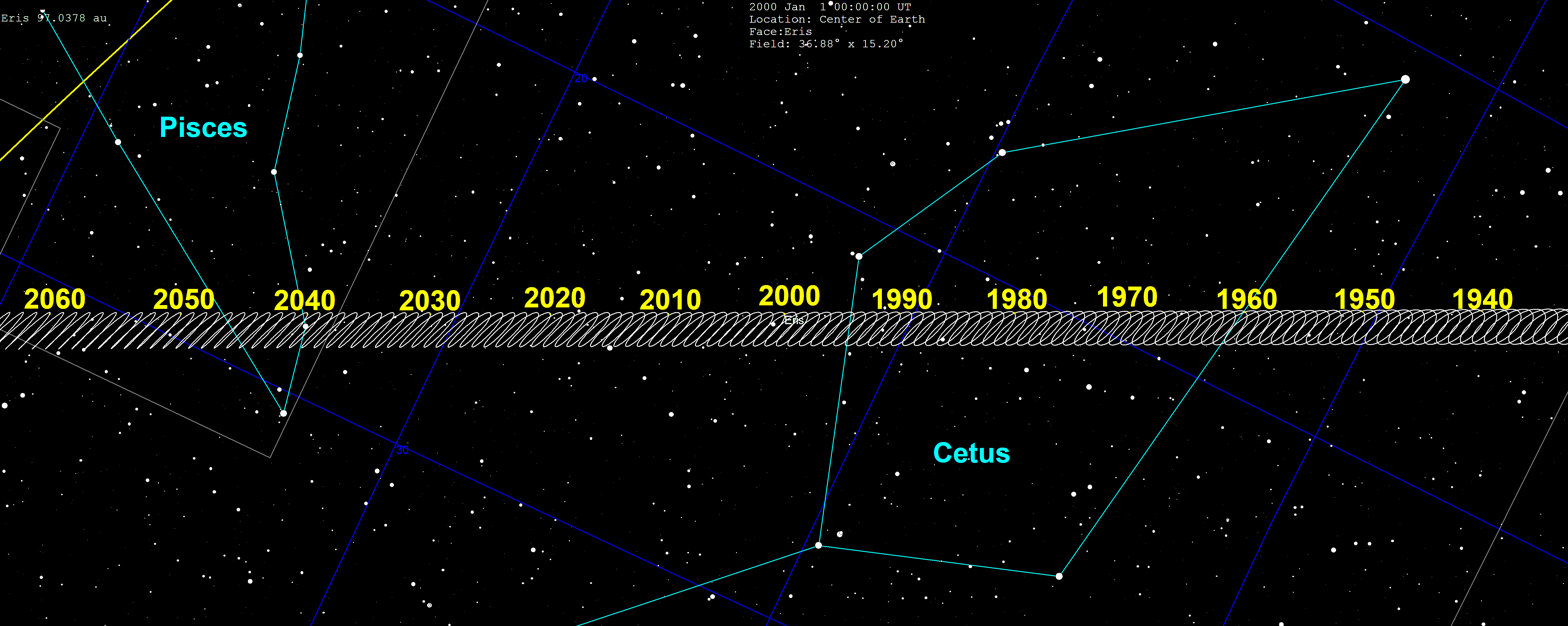
Seen from Earth, Eris makes small loops in the sky through the constellation of Cetus.

Eris has an orbital period of 558 years, more than twice that of Pluto. Its maximum possible distance from the Sun (aphelion) is 97.7 astronomical units (AU), and its closest (perihelion) is 38.4 AU. As the time of perihelion is defined at the epoch chosen using an unperturbed two-body solution, the further the epoch is from the date of perihelion, the less accurate the result. Numerical integration is required to predict the time of perihelion accurately. Numerical integration by JPL Horizons shows that Eris came to perihelion around 1699, to aphelion around 1977, and will return to perihelion on 6 December 2257. Unlike those of the eight planets, whose orbits all lie roughly in the same plane as the Earth's, Eris's orbit is highly inclined: it is tilted at an angle of about 44 degrees to the ecliptic. When discovered, Eris and its moon were the most distant known objects in the Solar System, apart from long-period comets and space probes. It retained this distinction until the discovery of 2018 VG18 in 2018.

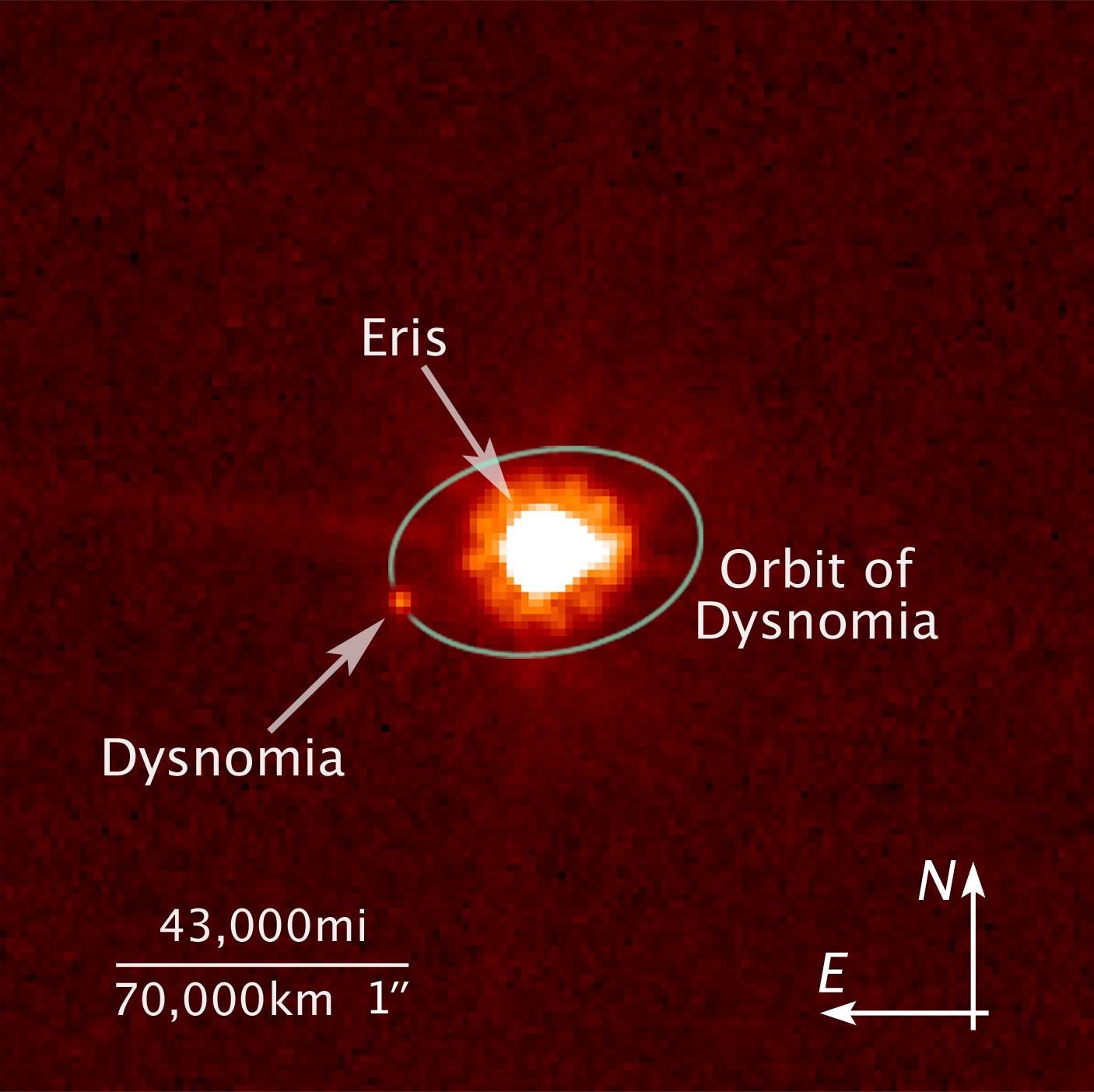
Eris and its moon Dysnomia imaged by Hubble Space Telescope on August 30, 2006. Dysnomia's orbit around Eris labeled.

The Eridian orbit is highly eccentric, and brings Eris to within 37.9 AU of the Sun, a typical perihelion for scattered objects. This is within the orbit of Pluto, but still safe from direct interaction with Neptune (~37 AU). Pluto, on the other hand, like other plutinos, follows a less inclined and less eccentric orbit and, protected by orbital resonance, can cross Neptune's orbit. In about 800 years, Eris will be closer to the Sun than Pluto for some time (see the graph at the left).

As of 2007, Eris has an apparent magnitude of 18.7, making it bright enough to be detectable to some amateur telescopes. A 200-millimetre (7.9 in) telescope with a CCD can detect Eris under favorable conditions. (Note: For an example of an amateur image of Eris, see Fred Bruenjes' Astronomy) The reason it had not been noticed until 2005 is its steep orbital inclination; searches for large outer Solar System objects tend to concentrate on the ecliptic plane, where most bodies are found.

Because of the high inclination of its orbit, Eris passes through only a few constellations of the traditional Zodiac; as of 2026 it is in the constellation Cetus. It was in Sculptor from 1876 until 1929 and Phoenix from roughly 1840 until 1875. In 2036, it will enter Pisces and stay there until 2065, when it will enter Aries. It will then move into the northern sky, entering Perseus in 2128 and Camelopardalis (where it will reach its northernmost declination) in 2173.

== Size, mass and density ==
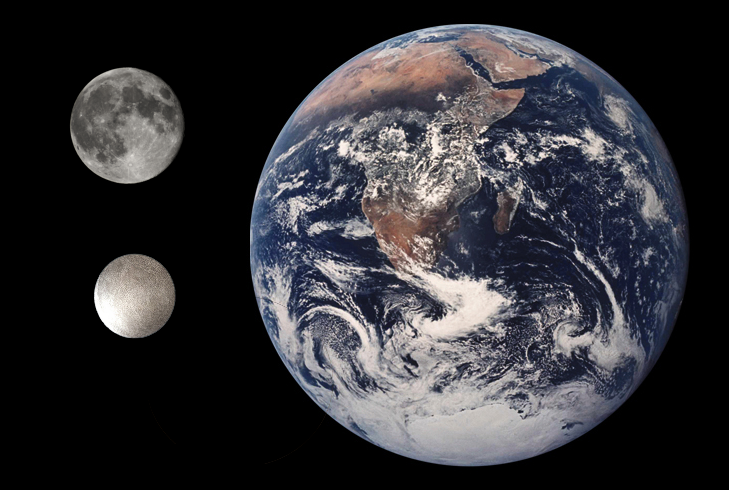
Size comparison: Eris (lower left) with the Moon and Earth (top and right)

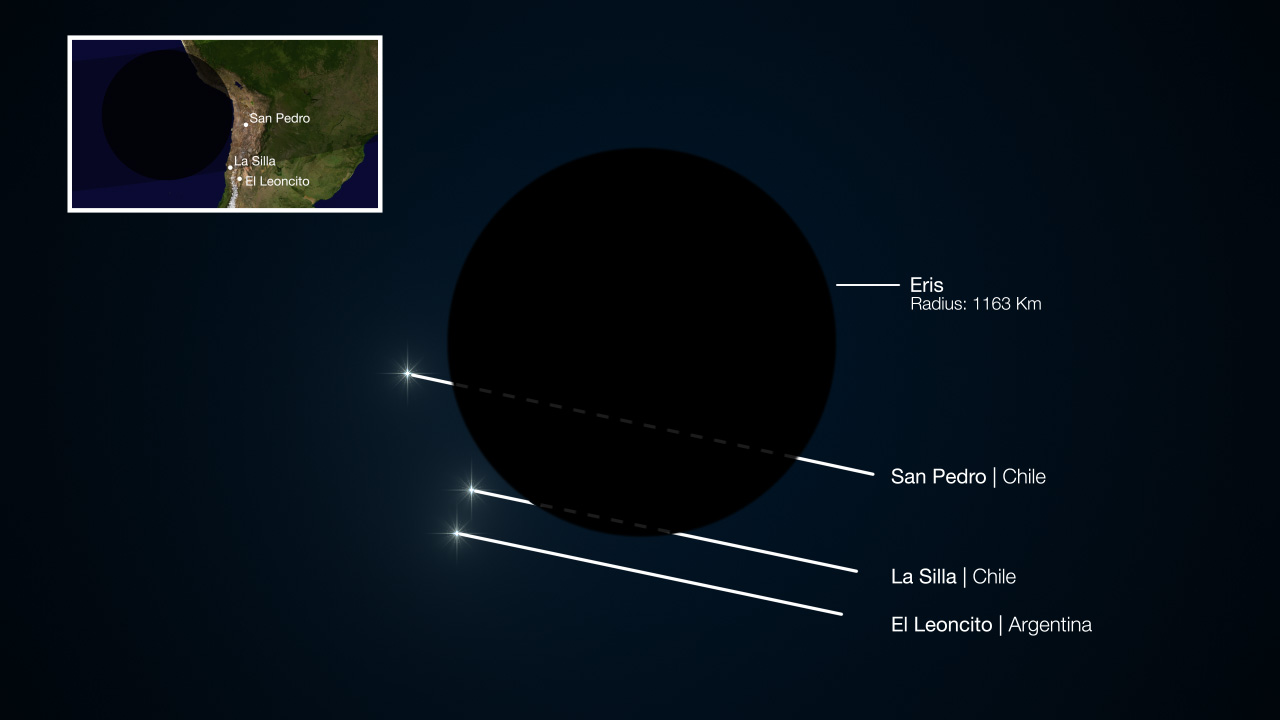
Illustration of the stellar occultation by Eris in November 2010. The resulting occultation chords project a circular silhouette for Eris, giving a spherical diameter of 2,326 km (1,445 mi).

Size estimates
Year	Radius km	Source
2005	1,199	Hubble
2007	1,300	Spitzer
2011	1,163	Occultation

1. Triton 21.39
2. Eris 16.38
3. Pluto 13.03
4. Haumea 3.95
5. Makemake 2.69
6. Gonggong 1.75
7. Charon 1.59
8. Quaoar 1.21
The mass of Eris compared to other dwarf planets (Pluto, Haumea, Makemake, Gonggong and Quaoar, plus Pluto's moon Charon and the former dwarf planet Triton (Neptune I). The unit of mass is ×10^{21} kg.

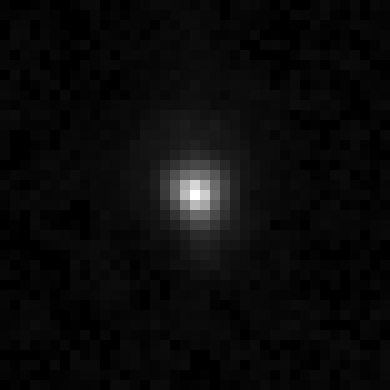
Eris as taken by the Hubble Space Telescope. This image is one of the clearer shots of Eris.

In November 2010, Eris was the subject of one of the most distant stellar occultations yet from Earth. Preliminary data from this event cast doubt on previous size estimates. The teams announced their final results from the occultation in October 2011, with an estimated diameter of 2326±12 km.

This makes Eris a little smaller than Pluto, which is 2376.6±1.6 km across, although Eris is more massive. It also indicates a geometric albedo of 0.96. It is speculated that the high albedo is due to the surface ices being replenished because of temperature fluctuations as Eris's eccentric orbit takes it closer and farther from the Sun.

The mass of Eris can be calculated with much greater precision. Based on the accepted value for Dysnomia's period at the time—15.774 days—Eris is 27% more massive than Pluto. Using the 2011 occultation results, Eris has a density of 2.52±0.07 g/cm^{3}, (Note: Calculated by dividing the listed mass by the listed volume) substantially denser than Pluto, and thus must be composed largely of rocky materials.

Models of internal heating via radioactive decay suggest that Eris could have a subsurface ocean of liquid water at the mantle–core boundary. Tidal heating of Eris by its moon Dysnomia may additionally contribute to the preservation of its possible subsurface ocean. More research concluded that Eris, Pluto and Makemake could harbor active subsurface oceans and show active geothermal activity.

In July 2015, after nearly a decade of Eris being thought to be the ninth-largest-known object to directly orbit the Sun, close-up imagery from the New Horizons mission determined the volume of Pluto to be slightly larger than that of Eris. Eris is thus the tenth-largest-known object to directly orbit the Sun by volume and the ninth largest by mass.

== Surface and atmosphere ==
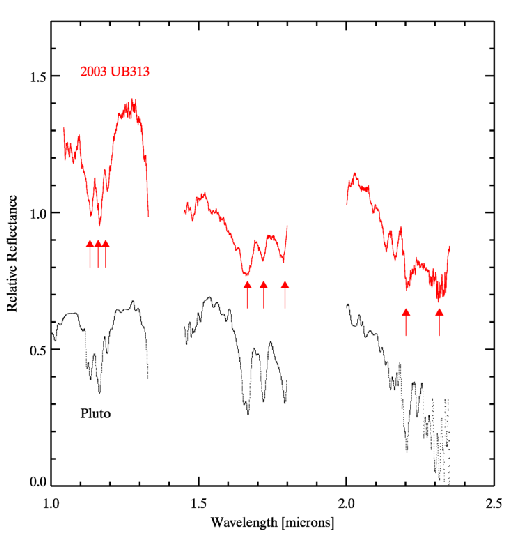
The infrared spectrum of Eris, compared to that of Pluto, shows the marked similarities between the two bodies. Arrows denote methane absorption lines.

The discovery team followed up their initial identification of Eris with spectroscopic observations made at the 8 m Gemini North Telescope in Hawaii on January 25, 2005. Infrared light from the object revealed the presence of methane ice, indicating that the surface may be similar to that of Pluto, which at the time was the only TNO known to have surface methane, and of Neptune's moon Triton, which also has methane on its surface. In 2022, near-infrared spectroscopy of Eris by the James Webb Space Telescope (JWST) revealed the presence of deuterated methane ice on its surface, at abundances lower than those in Jupiter-family comets like 67P/Churyumov–Gerasimenko. Eris's comparatively low deuterium abundance suggests that its methane is not primordial and instead may have been produced from subsurface geochemical processes. Substantial quantities of nitrogen ice on Eris was also detected by the JWST, and it is presumed to have originated from subsurface processes similar to Eris's likely non-primordial methane. The abundance of nitrogen ice on Eris is estimated to be one-third of that of methane by volume.

Unlike the somewhat reddish and variegated surfaces of Pluto and Triton, the surface of Eris appears almost white and uniform. Pluto's reddish color is thought to be due to deposits of tholins on its surface, and where these deposits darken the surface, the lower albedo leads to higher temperatures and the evaporation of methane deposits. In contrast, Eris is far enough from the Sun that methane can condense onto its surface even where the albedo is low. The condensation of methane uniformly over the surface reduces any albedo contrasts and would cover up any deposits of red tholins. This methane sublimation and condensation cycle could produce bladed terrain on Eris, similar to those on Pluto. Alternatively, Eris's surface could be refreshed through radiogenic convection of a global methane and nitrogen ice glacier, similar to Pluto's Sputnik Planitia. Spectroscopic observations by the JWST support the idea that Eris's surface is continually refreshing, as no signs of ethane, a byproduct of radiolyzed methane, were detected on Eris's surface.

Due to the distant and eccentric orbit of Eris, its surface temperature is estimated to vary from about 30 to 56 K (−243.2 to −217.2 °C; −405.7 to −358.9 °F). Even though Eris can be up to three times farther from the Sun than Pluto, it approaches close enough that some of the ices on the surface might warm enough to sublime to form an atmosphere. Because methane and nitrogen are both highly volatile, their presence shows either that Eris has always resided in the distant reaches of the Solar System, where it is cold enough for methane and nitrogen ice to persist, or that the celestial body has an internal source to replenish gas that escapes from its atmosphere. This contrasts with observations of another discovered TNO, Haumea, which reveal the presence of water ice but not methane.

== Rotation ==
Eris displays very little variation in brightness as it rotates due to its uniform surface, making measurement of its rotation period difficult. Precise long-term monitoring of Eris's brightness indicates that it is tidally locked to its moon Dysnomia, with a rotation period synchronous with the moon's orbital period of 15.78 Earth days. Dysnomia is also tidally locked to Eris, which makes the Eris–Dysnomia system the second known case of double-synchronous rotation, after Pluto and Charon. Previous measurements of Eris's rotation period obtained highly uncertain values ranging tens of hours to several days due to insufficient long-term coverage of Eris's rotation. The axial tilt of Eris has not been measured, but it can be reasonably assumed that it is the same as Dysnomia's orbital inclination, which would be about 78 degrees with respect to the ecliptic. If this were the case, most of Eris's northern hemisphere would be illuminated by sunlight, with 30% of the hemisphere experiencing constant illumination in 2018.

== Satellites ==
=== Dysnomia ===
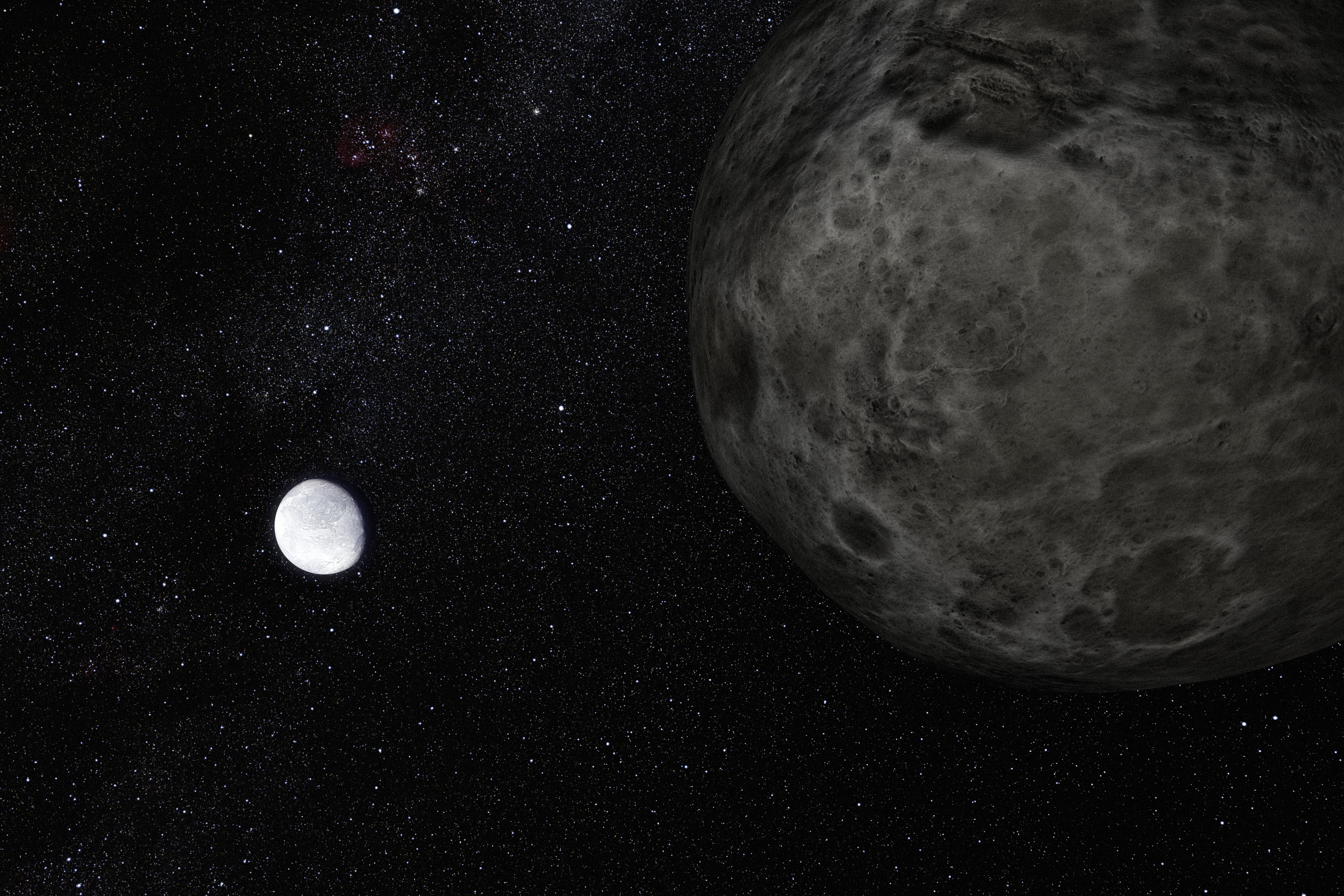
Artist's conception of Eris and its dark moon Dysnomia

In 2005, the adaptive optics team at the Keck telescopes in Hawaii carried out observations of the four brightest TNOs (Pluto, Makemake, Haumea and Eris), using the newly commissioned laser guide star adaptive optics system. Images taken on September 10 revealed a moon in orbit around Eris. In keeping with the "Xena" nickname already in use for Eris, Brown's team nicknamed the moon "Gabrielle", after the television warrior princess's sidekick. When Eris received its official name from the IAU, the moon received the name Dysnomia, after the Greek goddess of lawlessness who was Eris's daughter. Brown says he picked it for similarity to his wife's name, Diane. The name also retains an oblique reference to Eris's old informal name Xena, portrayed on television by Lucy Lawless, though the connection was unintentional.

=== Possible second moon ===
A 2021 study led by Bryan Holler and colleagues found that the orbit of Dysnomia is non-Keplerian, meaning its orbit does not form a fixed ellipse. This suggests Dysnomia's orbit is precessing, due to gravitational perturbations by an unknown source. Holler and colleagues hypothesized that Dysnomia could be perturbed by either Eris having an oblate shape, Dysnomia having a non-spherical shape, or an unseen moon orbiting close to Eris. In 2023, Marina Brozović and Robert Jacobson performed a preliminary investigation into Dysnomia's non-Keplerian orbit and proposed that it was most likely caused by an unseen inner moon in a mean-motion orbital resonance with Dysnomia.

Observations by the Gaia spacecraft have shown that Eris's brightness subtly varies with a period of 18.853 ± 0.015 hours (0.78554 ± 0.00063 d) and a small amplitude of 0.031±0.006 magnitudes. The origin of this 18.85-hour periodicity is unclear, as it could not be explained by the rotation of either Eris or Dysnomia. A 2025 study led by Jose-Luis Ortiz and colleagues hypothesized that this 18.85-hour signal could be caused by a very large, unseen moon orbiting close to Eris: this moon would be roughly 1,000 km (620 mi) in diameter and would orbit either 5,050 or 8,010 km (3,140 or 4,980 mi) away from Eris, depending on whether its orbital period is equal to or double the 18.85-hour period. Although this hypothesized moon could explain Dysnomia's non-Keplerian orbital motion and Eris's overestimated density, albedo and thermal emission, it does not explain why Eris is tidally locked to the smaller Dysnomia instead of this larger putative inner moon. There could also be alternatives to the 18.85-hour periodicity, which is open to interpretation.

Eridian system
Name	Diameter (km)	Semi-major axis (km)	Mass (× 10^{22} kg)	Discovery date
Eris	2326±12		1.638±0.014	January 5, 2005
Dysnomia	615+60 −50	37273±64	0.008±0.006	September 10, 2005

== Exploration ==
Eris was observed from afar by the outbound New Horizons spacecraft in May 2020, as part of its extended mission following its successful Pluto flyby in 2015. Although New Horizons (112 AU) was farther from Eris than Eris was from Earth (96 AU), the spacecraft's unique vantage point inside the Kuiper belt permitted observations of Eris at high-phase angles that are otherwise unobtainable from Earth, enabling the determination of the light scattering properties and phase curve behavior of the Eridian surface.

In the 2010s, there were multiple studies for follow-on missions to explore the Kuiper belt, among which Eris was evaluated as a candidate. It was calculated that a flyby mission to Eris would take 24.66 years using a Jupiter gravity-assist, based on launch dates of April 3, 2032, or April 7, 2044. Eris would be 92.03 or 90.19 AU from the Sun when the spacecraft arrives.

== See also ==
- Clearing the neighbourhood
- List of Solar System objects most distant from the Sun
- List of trans-Neptunian objects
- How I Killed Pluto and Why It Had It Coming
- Mesoplanet
- Ocean worlds
- Extraterrestrial liquid water
