= 2013 FS28 =

Trans-Neptunian object in the scattered disc

2013 FS_{28}
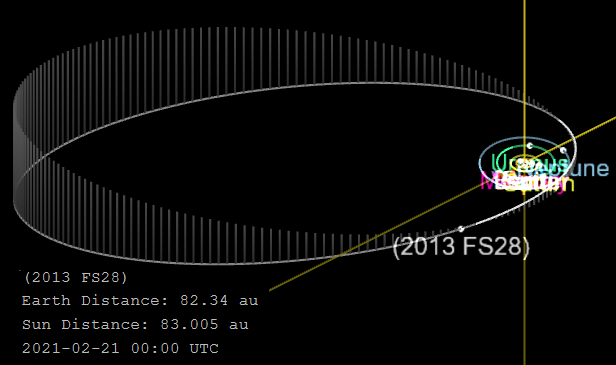
- Orbit of 2013 FS_{28}

Discovery
- Discovered by: (first observed only); S. S. Sheppard; C. Trujillo
- Discovery site: Cerro Tololo Obs.
- Discovery date: 16 March 2013

Designations
- Minor planet category: TNO · ESDO · ETNO distant

Orbital characteristics
- Epoch 2021-Jul-01 (JD 2459396.5)
- Uncertainty parameter 5
- Observation arc: 7.85 yr (2866 d)
- Aphelion: 241.1±2 AU (Q)
- Perihelion: 35.64±0.05 AU (q)
- Semi-major axis: 138.4±1.2 AU (a)
- Eccentricity: 0.742±0.003 (e)
- Orbital period (sidereal): 1627±22 years
- Mean anomaly: 338°±0.35° (M)
- Mean motion: 0° 0^{m} 1.44^{s} / day
- Inclination: 13.09°±0.002° (i)
- Longitude of ascending node: 204.6°±0.001° (Ω)
- Time of perihelion: ≈ December 2119 ±1 year (Note: Uncertainty in the perihelion date is 95 days (1-sigma) or 285 days (3-sigma).)
- Argument of perihelion: 104.8°±0.09° (ω)
- Known satellites: 0
- Neptune MOID: 9.1 AU

Physical characteristics
- Mean diameter: 464 km (est.); 468 km (est.)
- Geometric albedo: 0.07 (assumed); 0.09 (assumed)
- Absolute magnitude (H): 4.9

2013 FS_{28} is an extreme trans-Neptunian object from the extended scattered disc on a highly eccentric orbit in the outermost region of the Solar System.

It measures approximately 470 kilometers (290 miles) in diameter. The detached, extended scattered disc object belongs to the group of extreme trans-Neptunian objects.

== Discovery and naming ==
2013 FS_{28} was discovered on 16 March 2013, by American astronomers Scott Sheppard and Chad Trujillo at the Cerro Tololo Observatory in Chile.

As of 2025, this minor planet has neither been numbered nor named by the Minor Planet Center. The official discoverer(s) will be defined when the object is numbered.

== Orbit and classification ==
2013 FS_{28} is 83 AU (12.4 billion km) from the Sun with a 7 year observation arc. It orbits the Sun at a distance of roughly 36–240 AU once every 1600 years. Its orbit has a high eccentricity of 0.7 and an inclination of 13° with respect to the ecliptic. It has a minimum orbital intersection distance with Neptune of 9 AU. The body's observation arc begins with its first official observation in March 2013, using the 4-meter Blanco Telescope at Cerro Tololo Observatory (807).

It belongs to a small group of detached objects with perihelion distances of 30 AU or more, and semi-major axes of 150 AU or more. Such extreme trans-Neptunian objects (ETNOs) can not reach such orbits without some perturbing object, which lead to the speculation of Planet Nine. It comes to perihelion (closest approach to the Sun) around December 2119.

== Physical characteristics ==
According to Johnston's Archive and to American astronomer Michael Brown, 2013 FS_{28} measures 464 and 468 kilometers in diameter based on an assumed albedo of 0.09 and 0.07, respectively. As of 2018, no rotational lightcurve of has been obtained from photometric observations. The body's rotation period, pole and shape remain unknown.

== See also ==
- List of unnumbered trans-Neptunian objects § 2013 FS28
