= Dwarf planet =

Small planetary-mass object

Nine likeliest (Note: The hydrostatic equilibrium criterion of a dwarf planet currently cannot be confirmed unless a spacecraft directly visits the object.) dwarf planets
and dates of discovery

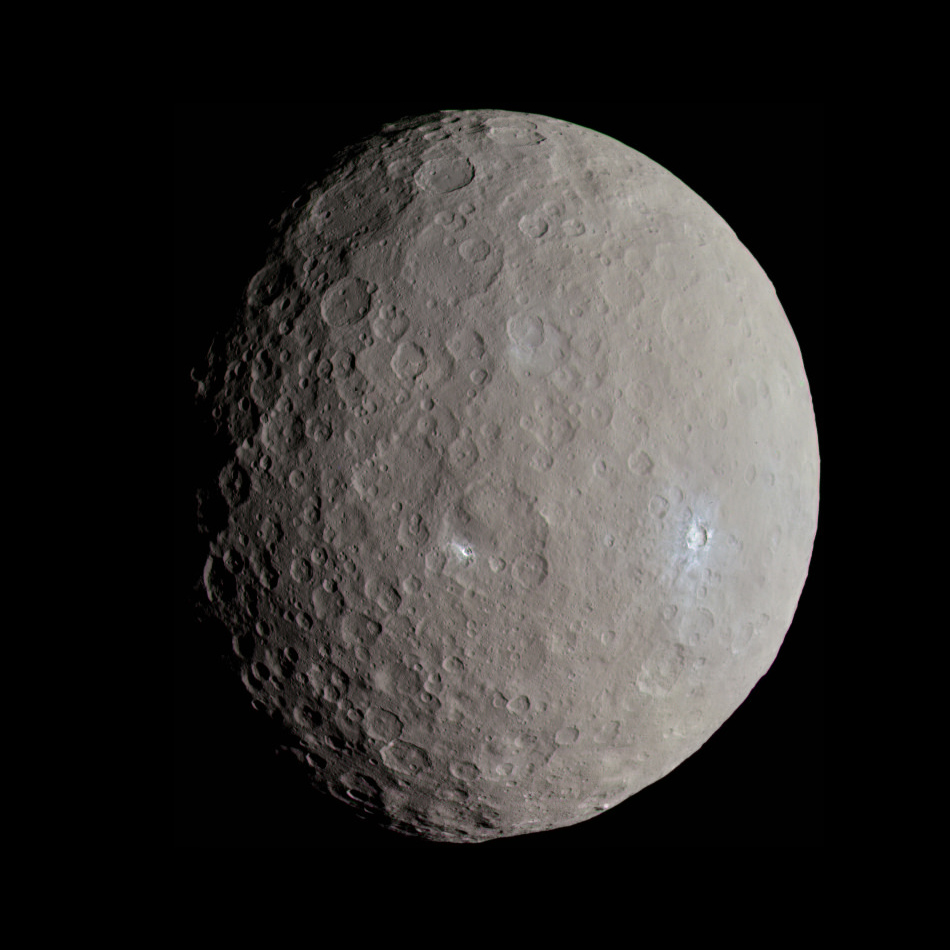
Ceres (1801)

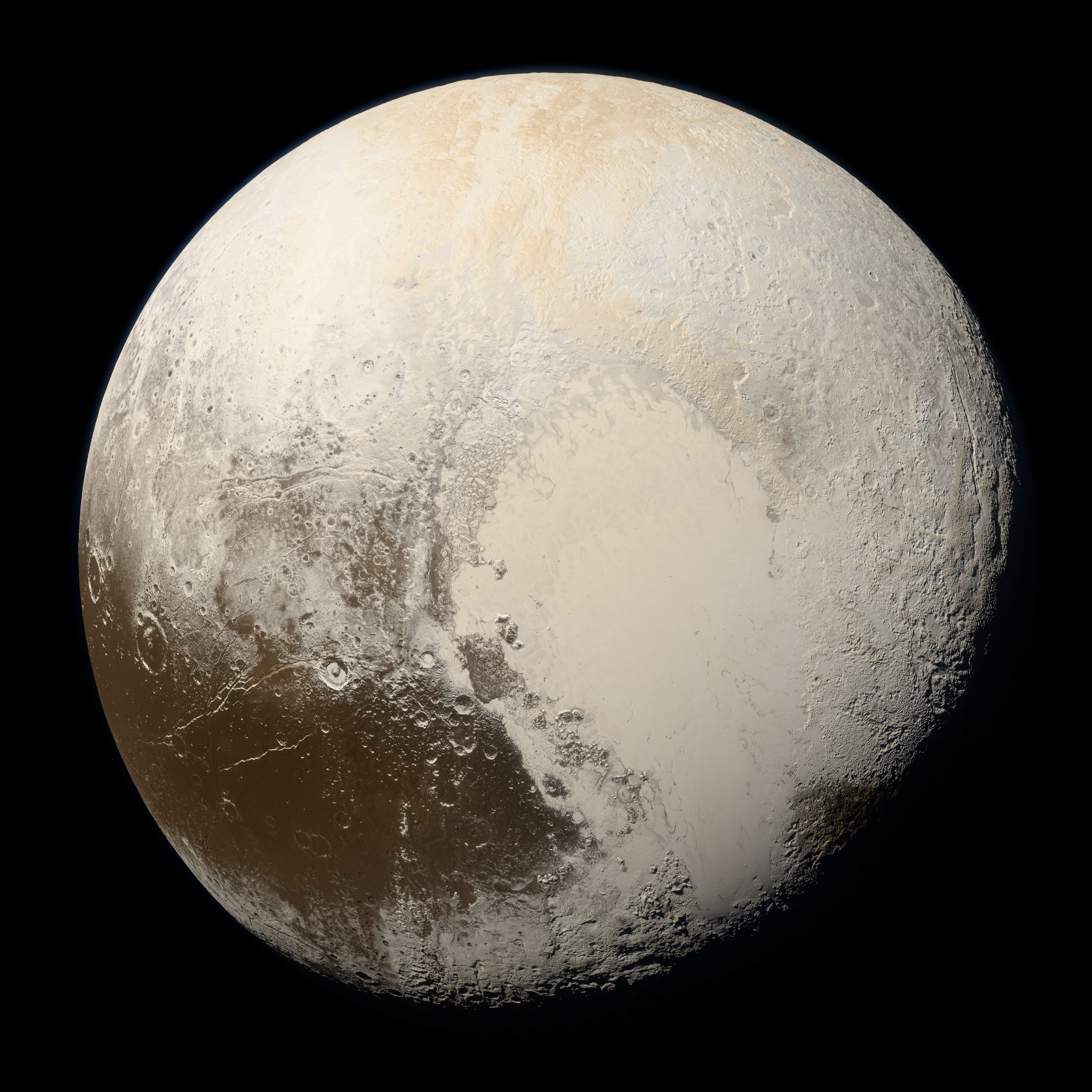
Pluto (1930)

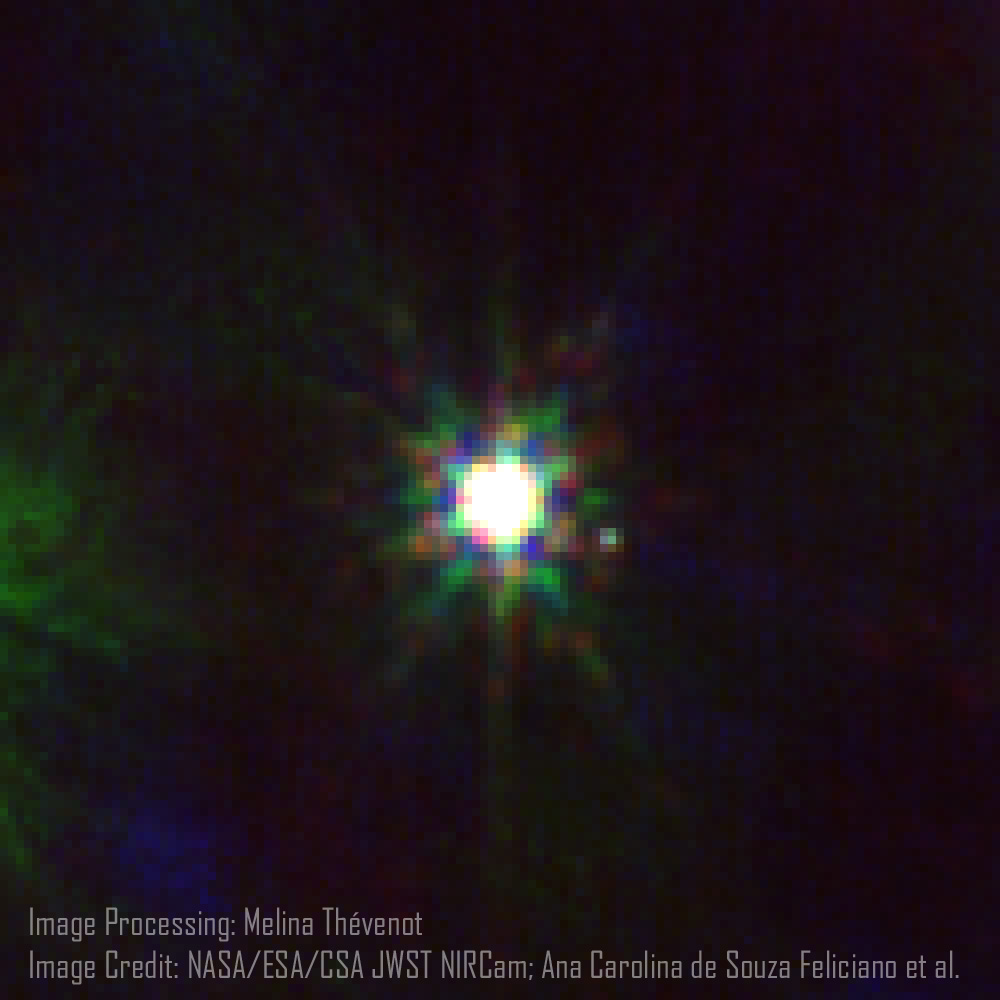
Quaoar (2002)

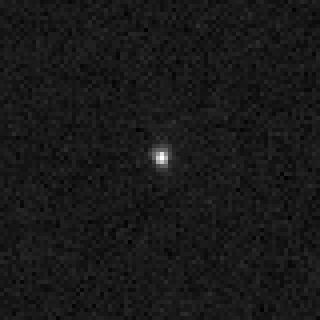
Sedna (2003)

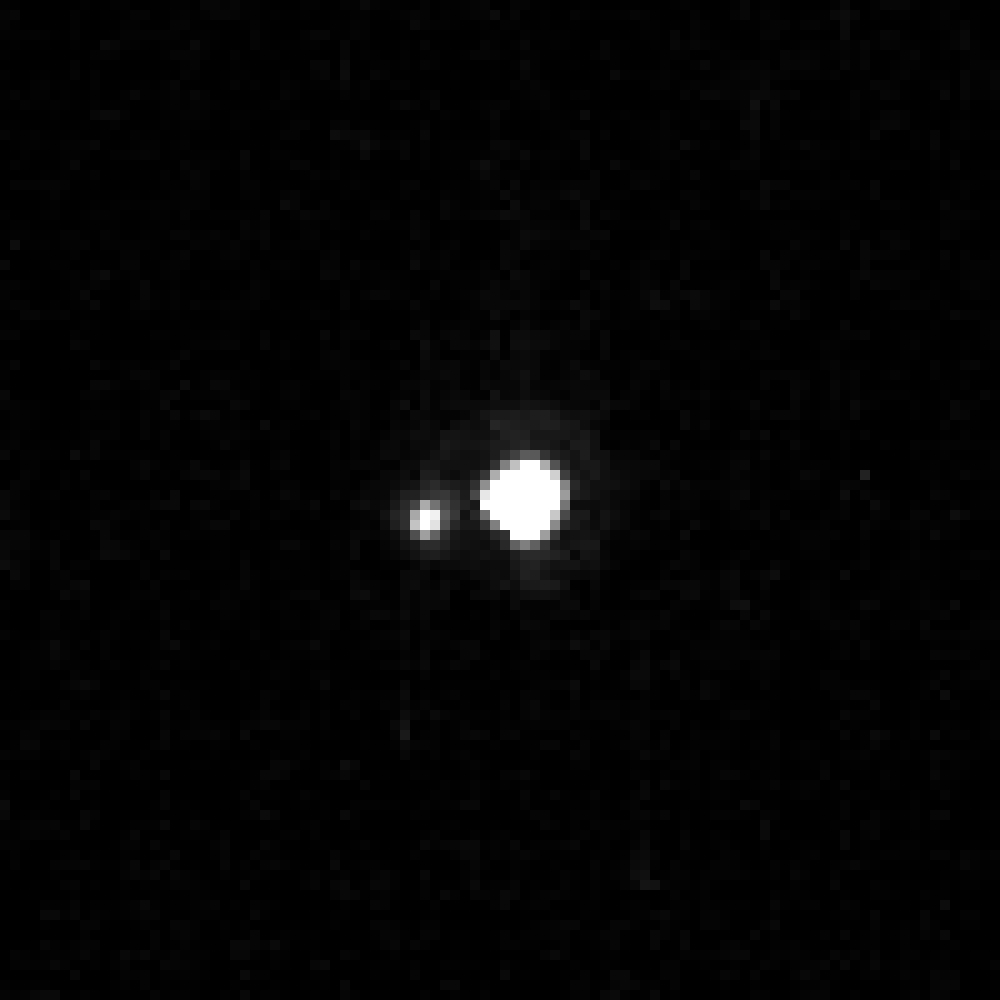
Orcus (2004)

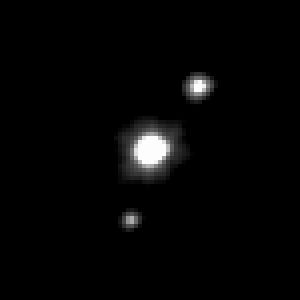
Haumea (2004)

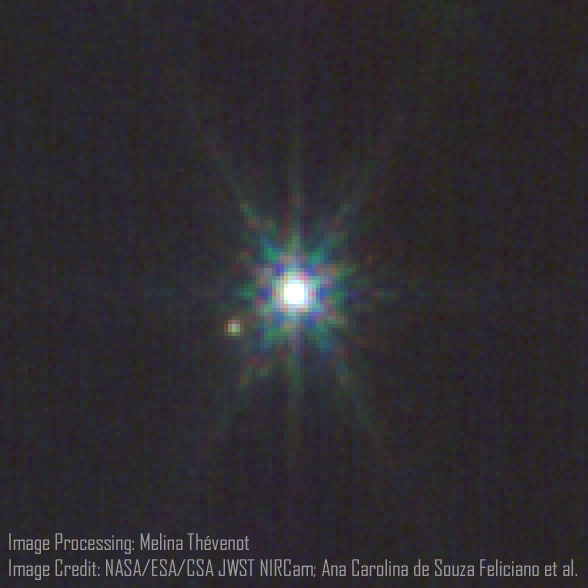
Eris (2005)

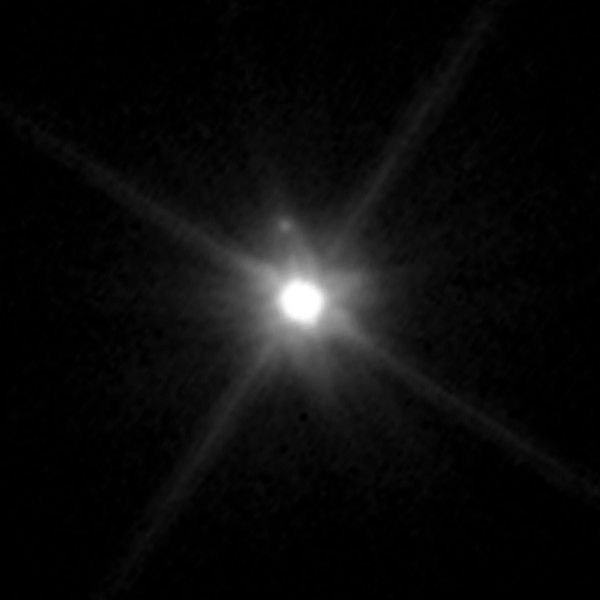
Makemake (2005)

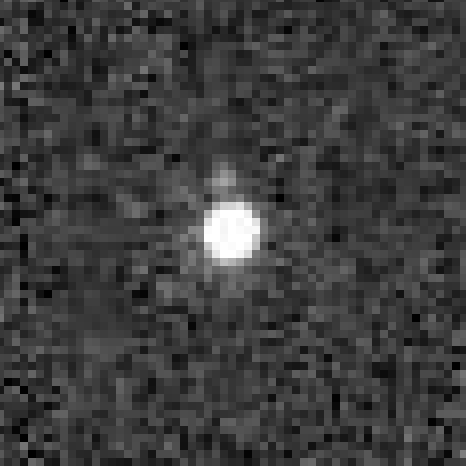
Gonggong (2007)

A dwarf planet is a small planetary-mass object that is in direct orbit around the Sun, massive enough to be gravitationally rounded, but insufficient to achieve orbital dominance like the eight classical planets of the Solar System. The prototypical dwarf planet is Pluto, which for decades was regarded as a planet before the "dwarf" concept was adopted in 2006. Many planetary geologists consider dwarf planets and planetary-mass moons to be planets, but since 2006 the IAU and many astronomers have excluded them from the roster of planets.

Dwarf planets are capable of being geologically active, an expectation that was borne out in 2015 by the Dawn mission to Ceres and the New Horizons mission to Pluto. Planetary geologists are therefore particularly interested in them.

Astronomers are in general agreement that at least the nine largest candidates are dwarf planets – in rough order of decreasing diameter, Pluto, Eris, Haumea, Makemake, Gonggong, Quaoar, Sedna, Ceres, and Orcus. A considerable uncertainty remains over the tenth largest candidate Salacia, which may thus be considered a borderline case. Of these ten, two have been visited by spacecraft (Pluto and Ceres) and seven others have at least one known moon (Eris, Haumea, Makemake, Gonggong, Quaoar, Orcus, and Salacia), which allows their masses and thus an estimate of their densities to be determined. Mass and density in turn can be fit into geophysical models in an attempt to determine the nature of these worlds. Only one, Sedna, has neither been visited nor has any known moons, making an accurate estimate of mass difficult. Some astronomers include many smaller bodies as well, but there is no consensus that these are likely to be dwarf planets.

== History of the concept ==
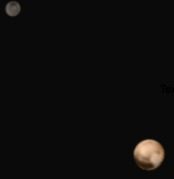
Near true-colour image of Pluto and its moon Charon. Separation to scale

Starting in 1801, astronomers discovered Ceres and other bodies between Mars and Jupiter that for decades were considered to be planets. Between then and around 1851, when the number of planets had reached 23, astronomers started using the word asteroid (from Greek, meaning 'star-like' or 'star-shaped') for the smaller bodies and began to distinguish them as minor planets rather than major planets.

With the discovery of Pluto in 1930, most astronomers considered the Solar System to have nine major planets, along with thousands of significantly smaller bodies (asteroids and comets). For almost 50 years, Pluto was thought to be larger than Mercury, but with the discovery in 1978 of Pluto's moon Charon, it became possible to measure Pluto's mass accurately and to determine that it was much smaller than initial estimates. It was roughly one twentieth the mass of Mercury, which made Pluto by far the smallest planet. Although it was still more than ten times as massive as the largest object in the asteroid belt, Ceres, it had only one-fifth the mass of Earth's Moon. Furthermore, having some unusual characteristics, such as large orbital eccentricity and a high orbital inclination, it became evident that it was a different kind of body from any of the other planets.

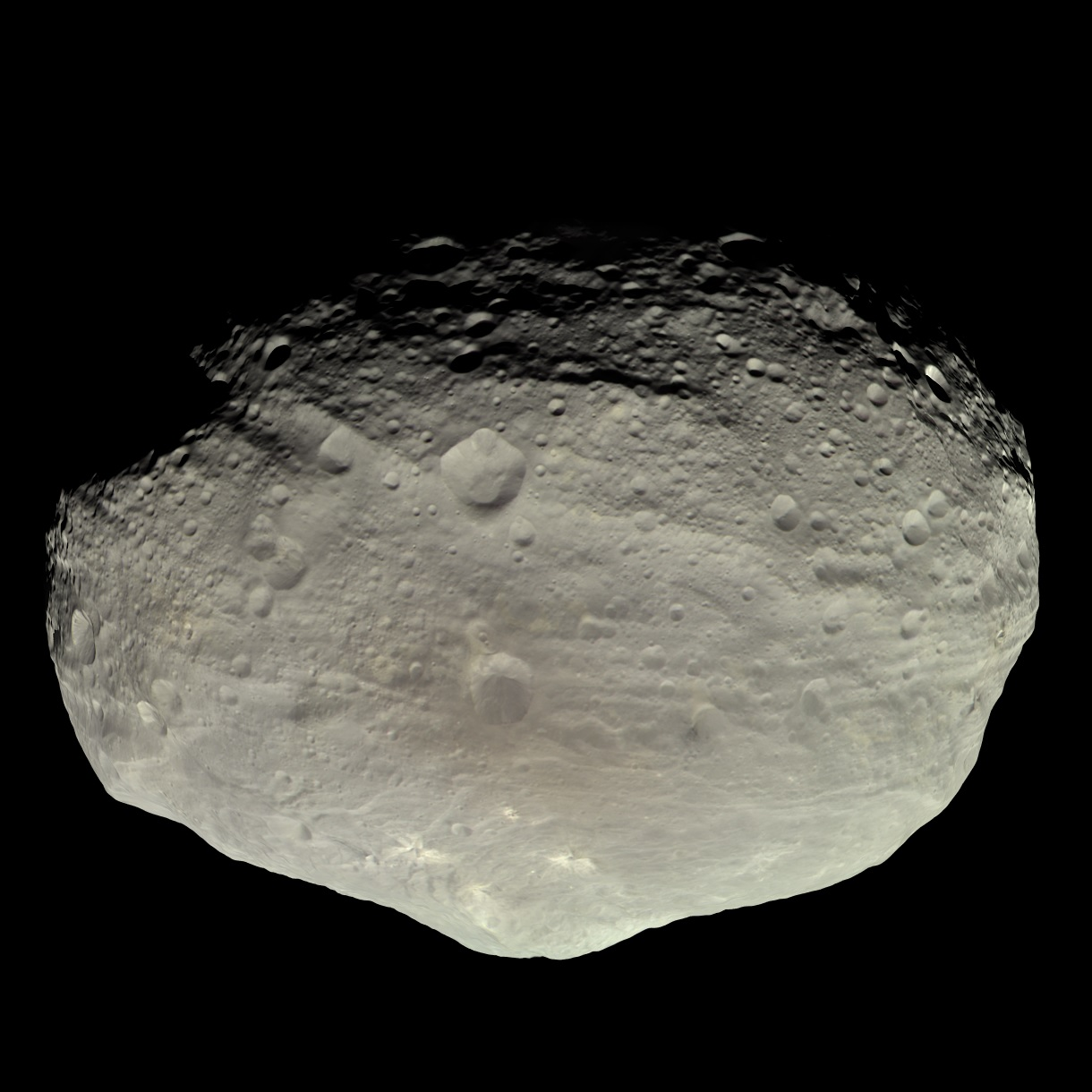
4 Vesta, an asteroid that was once a dwarf planet

In the 1990s, astronomers began to find objects in the same region of space as Pluto (now known as the Kuiper belt), and some even farther away. Many of these shared several of Pluto's key orbital characteristics, and Pluto started being seen as the largest member of a new class of objects, the plutinos. It became clear that either the larger of these bodies would also have to be classified as planets, or Pluto would have to be reclassified, much as Ceres had been reclassified after the discovery of additional asteroids. This led some astronomers to stop referring to Pluto as a planet. Several terms, including subplanet and planetoid, started to be used for the bodies now known as dwarf planets. Astronomers were also confident that more objects as large as Pluto would be discovered, and the number of planets would start growing quickly if Pluto were to remain classified as a planet.

Eris (then known as 2003 UB_{313}), a trans-Neptunian object, was discovered in January 2005; it was thought to be slightly larger than Pluto, and some reports informally referred to it as the tenth planet. As a consequence, the issue became a matter of intense debate during the IAU General Assembly in August 2006. The IAU's initial draft proposal included Charon, Eris, and Ceres in the list of planets. After many astronomers objected to this proposal, an alternative was drawn up by the Uruguayan astronomers Julio Ángel Fernández and Gonzalo Tancredi: They proposed an intermediate category for objects large enough to be round but that had not cleared their orbits of planetesimals. Beside dropping Charon from the list, the new proposal also removed Pluto, Ceres, and Eris, because they have not cleared their orbits.

Although concerns were raised about the classification of planets orbiting other stars, the issue was not resolved; it was proposed instead to decide this only when dwarf-planet-size objects start to be observed.

In the immediate aftermath of the IAU definition of dwarf planet, some scientists expressed their disagreement with the IAU resolution. Campaigns included car bumper stickers and T-shirts. Mike Brown (the discoverer of Eris) agrees with the reduction of the number of planets to eight.

NASA announced in 2006 that it would use the new guidelines established by the IAU. Alan Stern, the director of NASA's mission to Pluto, rejects the current IAU definition of planet, both in terms of defining dwarf planets as something other than a type of planet, and in using orbital characteristics (rather than intrinsic characteristics) of objects to define them as dwarf planets. Thus, in 2011, he still referred to Pluto as a planet, and accepted other likely dwarf planets such as Ceres and Eris, as well as the larger moons, as additional planets. Several years before the IAU definition, he used orbital characteristics to separate "überplanets" (the dominant eight) from "unterplanets" (the dwarf planets), considering both types "planets".

== Name ==
Euler diagram showing the IAU Executive Committee conception of the types of bodies in the Solar System (except the Sun)

Names for large subplanetary bodies include dwarf planet, planetoid (more general term), meso-planet (narrowly used for sizes between Mercury and Ceres), quasi-planet, and (in the transneptunian region) plutoid. Dwarf planet, however, was originally coined as a term for the smallest planets, not the largest sub-planets, and is still used that way by many planetary astronomers.

The term dwarf planet, used as a synonym for asteroid, dates back at least to 1838. It has also been used as an antonym for giant planet, including the terrestrial planets Mercury, Venus, Earth, and Mars, as well as the Moon. In their 2006 codification, the IAU decided that dwarf planets are not to be considered planets. Other terms for the IAU definition of the largest subplanetary bodies that do not have such conflicting connotations or usage include quasi-planet and the older term planetoid ("having the form of a planet"). Michael E. Brown stated that planetoid is "a perfectly good word" that has been used for these bodies for years, and that the use of the term dwarf planet for a non-planet is "dumb", but that it was motivated by an attempt by the IAU division III plenary session to reinstate Pluto as a planet in a second resolution. Indeed, the draft of Resolution 5A had called these median bodies planetoids, but the plenary session voted unanimously to change the name to dwarf planet. The second resolution, 5B, defined dwarf planets as a subtype of planet, as Stern had originally intended, distinguished from the other eight that were to be called "classical planets". Under this arrangement, the twelve planets of the rejected proposal were to be preserved in a distinction between eight classical planets and four dwarf planets. Resolution 5B was defeated in the same session that 5A was passed. Because of the semantic inconsistency of a dwarf planet not being a planet due to the failure of Resolution 5B, alternative terms such as nanoplanet and subplanet were discussed, but there was no consensus among the CSBN to change it.

IAU Resolution 6a of 2006 recognizes Pluto as "the prototype of a new category of trans-Neptunian objects". The name and precise nature of this category were not specified but left for the IAU to establish at a later date; in the debate leading up to the resolution, the members of the category were variously referred to as plutons and plutonian objects but neither name was carried forward, perhaps due to objections from geologists that this would create confusion with their pluton.

On June 11, 2008, the IAU Executive Committee announced a new term, plutoid, and a definition: all trans-Neptunian dwarf planets are plutoids. Other departments of the IAU have rejected the term:

...in part because of an email miscommunication, the WG-PSN [Working Group for Planetary System Nomenclature] was not involved in choosing the word plutoid. ... In fact, a vote taken by the WG-PSN subsequent to the Executive Committee meeting has rejected the use of that specific term..."

The category of 'plutoid' captured an earlier distinction between the 'terrestrial dwarf' Ceres and the 'ice dwarfs' of the outer Solar System, part of a conception of a threefold division of the Solar System into inner terrestrial planets, central giant planets, and outer ice dwarfs, of which Pluto was the principal member. 'Ice dwarf' also saw some use as an umbrella term for all trans-Neptunian minor planets, or for the ice asteroids of the outer Solar System; one attempted definition was that an ice dwarf "is larger than the nucleus of a normal comet and icier than a typical asteroid."

Since the Dawn mission, it has been recognized that Ceres is a geologically icy body that may have originated from the outer Solar System. Ceres has since been called an ice dwarf as well.

== Criteria ==
Planetary discriminants
Body	m/M_{🜨} ^{[†]}	Λ ^{[‡]}	µ ^{[§]}	Π ^{[#]}
Mercury	0.055	1.95×10^{3}	9.1×10^{4}	1.3×10^{2}
Venus	0.815	1.66×10^{5}	1.35×10^{6}	9.5×10^{2}
Earth	1	1.53×10^{5}	1.7×10^{6}	8.1×10^{2}
Mars	0.107	9.42×10^{2}	1.8×10^{5}	5.4×10^{1}
Ceres	0.00016	8.32×10^{−4}	0.33	4.0×10^{−2}
Jupiter	317.7	1.30×10^{9}	6.25×10^{5}	4.0×10^{4}
Saturn	95.2	4.68×10^{7}	1.9×10^{5}	6.1×10^{3}
Uranus	14.5	3.85×10^{5}	2.9×10^{4}	4.2×10^{2}
Neptune	17.1	2.73×10^{5}	2.4×10^{4}	3.0×10^{2}
Pluto	0.0022	2.95×10^{−3}	0.077	2.8×10^{−2}
Eris	0.0028	2.13×10^{−3}	0.10	2.0×10^{−2}
Sedna	0.0002	3.64×10^{−7}	<0.07 (Note: Calculated using the minimum estimate from 15 objects in its region with at least Sedna's mass, as estimated by Schwamb, Brown, & Rabinowitz (2009).)	1.6×10^{−4}
Planetary discriminants of the planets ( white), and of the largest known dwarf planet ( light purple ) in each orbital population (asteroid belt, Kuiper belt, scattered disc, sednoids). All other known objects in these populations have smaller discriminants than the one shown.
[†] / Mass in M_{🜨}, the unit of mass equal to that of Earth ( 5.97 × 10^{24} kg ).; [‡] / Λ is the capacity to clear the neighbourhood (greater than 1 for planets) by Stern & Levison (2002): Λ = k m^{2} a^{^{− 3/2}} , where k = 0.0043 for m in units of yottagrams (10^{18} metric tons) and a in astronomical units (AU), where a is the body's semi-major axis.; [§] / µ is Soter's planetary discriminant, which he finds greater than 100 for planets. µ = m/ M , where m is the mass of the body, and M is the aggregate mass of all the bodies that occupy its orbital zone except the body itself.; [#] / Π is the capacity to clear the neighbourhood (greater than 1 for planets) by Margot. Π = k m a^{^{− 9/8}} , where k = 807 for units of Earth masses and AU.

The category dwarf planet arose from a conflict between dynamical and geophysical ideas of what a useful conception of a planet would be. In terms of the dynamics of the Solar System, the major distinction is between bodies that gravitationally dominate their neighbourhood (Mercury through Neptune) and those that do not (such as the asteroids and Kuiper belt objects). A celestial body may have a dynamic (planetary) geology at approximately the mass required for its mantle to become plastic under its own weight, which results in the body acquiring a round shape. Because this requires a much lower mass than gravitationally dominating the region of space near their orbit, there are a population of objects that are massive enough to have a world-like appearance and planetary geology, but not massive enough to clear their neighborhood. Examples are Ceres in the asteroid belt and Pluto in the Kuiper belt.

Dynamicists usually prefer using gravitational dominance as the threshold for planethood, because from their perspective smaller bodies are better grouped with their neighbours, e.g. Ceres as simply a large asteroid and Pluto as a large Kuiper belt object. Geoscientists usually prefer roundness as the threshold, because from their perspective the internally driven geology of a body like Ceres makes it more similar to a classical planet like Mars, than to a small asteroid that lacks internally driven geology. This necessitated the creation of the category of dwarf planets to describe this intermediate class.

=== Orbital dominance ===
Alan Stern and Harold F. Levison introduced a parameter Λ (upper case lambda) in 2000, expressing the likelihood of an encounter resulting in a given deflection of orbit. The value of this parameter in Stern's model is proportional to the square of the mass and inversely proportional to the period. This value can be used to estimate the capacity of a body to clear the neighbourhood of its orbit, where Λ > 1 will eventually clear it. A gap of five orders of magnitude in Λ was found between the smallest terrestrial planets and the largest asteroids and Kuiper belt objects.

Using this parameter, Steven Soter and other astronomers argued for a distinction between planets and dwarf planets based on the inability of the latter to "clear the neighbourhood around their orbits": planets are able to remove smaller bodies near their orbits by collision, capture, or gravitational disturbance (or establish orbital resonances that prevent collisions), whereas dwarf planets lack the mass to do so. Soter went on to propose a parameter he called the planetary discriminant, designated with the symbol µ (mu), that represents an experimental measure of the actual degree of cleanliness of the orbital zone (where µ is calculated by dividing the mass of the candidate body by the total mass of the other objects that share its orbital zone), where µ > 100 is deemed to be cleared.

Jean-Luc Margot refined Stern and Levison's concept to produce a similar parameter Π (upper case Pi). It is based on theory, avoiding the empirical data used by Λ . Π > 1 indicates a planet, and there is again a gap of several orders of magnitude between planets and dwarf planets.

There are several other schemes that try to differentiate between planets and dwarf planets, but the 2006 definition uses this concept.

=== Hydrostatic equilibrium ===
Masses of the likeliest dwarf planets, with Charon for comparison.
1. Eris 16.38
2. Pluto 13.03
3. Haumea 3.95
4. Makemake 2.7
5. Gonggong 1.75
6. Charon 1.59
7. Quaoar 1.21
8. Ceres 0.94
9. Orcus 0.55
10. Salacia 0.47
The unit of mass is ×10^{21} kg. Eris and Pluto dominate. Unmeasured Sedna is excluded, but is likely on the order of Ceres. The Moon in contrast is 73.5×10^{21} kg, over four times more massive than Eris.

Enough internal pressure, caused by the body's gravitation, will turn a body plastic, and enough plasticity will allow high elevations to sink and hollows to fill in, a process known as gravitational relaxation. Bodies smaller than a few kilometers are dominated by non-gravitational forces and tend to have an irregular shape and may be rubble piles. Larger objects, where gravity is significant but not dominant, are potato-shaped; the more massive the body, the higher its internal pressure, the more solid it is and the more rounded its shape, until the pressure is enough to overcome its compressive strength and it achieves hydrostatic equilibrium. Then, a body is as round as it is possible to be, given its rotation and tidal effects, and is an ellipsoid in shape. This is the defining limit of a dwarf planet.

If an object is in hydrostatic equilibrium, a global layer of liquid on its surface would form a surface of the same shape as the body, apart from small-scale surface features such as craters and fissures. The body will have a spherical shape if it does not rotate and an ellipsoidal one if it does. The faster it rotates, the more oblate or even scalene it becomes. If such a rotating body were heated until it melts, its shape would not change. The extreme example of a body that may be scalene due to rapid rotation is Haumea, which is twice as long on its major axis as it is at the poles. If the body has a massive nearby companion, then tidal forces gradually slow its rotation until it is tidally locked; that is, it always presents the same face to its companion. Tidally locked bodies are also scalene, though sometimes only slightly so. Earth's Moon is tidally locked, as are all the rounded satellites of the gas giants. Pluto and Charon are tidally locked to each other, as are Eris and Dysnomia, and probably also Orcus and Vanth.

There are no specific size or mass limits of dwarf planets, as those are not defining features. There is no clear upper limit: an object very far out in the Solar System that is more massive than Mercury might not have had time to clear its neighbourhood, and such a body would fit the definition of dwarf planet rather than planet. Indeed, Mike Brown set out to find such an object. The lower limit is determined by the requirements of achieving and retaining hydrostatic equilibrium, but the size or mass at which an object attains and retains equilibrium depends on its composition and thermal history, not simply its mass. An IAU 2006 press release question-and-answer section estimated that objects with mass above 0.5×10^{21} kg and radius greater than 400 km would "normally" be in hydrostatic equilibrium (the shape ... would normally be determined by self-gravity), but that all borderline cases would need to be determined by observation. This is close to what as of 2019 is believed to be roughly the limit for objects beyond Neptune that are fully compact, solid bodies, with Salacia (r = 423±11 km, m = (0.492±0.007)×10^{21} kg) being a borderline case both for the 2006 Q&A expectations and in more recent evaluations, and with Orcus being just above the expected limit. No other body with a measured mass is close to the expected mass limit, though several without a measured mass approach the expected size limit.

== Population of dwarf planets ==
Comparison of sizes, albedos, and colours of various large trans-Neptunian objects with sizes of >700 km. The light and dark-coloured arcs represent uncertainties of the object's size.

Though the definition of a dwarf planet is clear, evidence about whether a given trans-Neptunian object is large and malleable enough to be shaped by its own gravitational field is often inconclusive. There are also outstanding questions relating to the interpretation of the IAU criterion in certain instances. Consequently the number of currently confirmed TNOs which meet the hydrostatic equilibrium criterion is uncertain.

The three objects under consideration during the debates leading up to the 2006 IAU acceptance of the category of dwarf planet – Ceres, Pluto and Eris – are generally accepted as dwarf planets, including by those astronomers who continue to classify dwarf planets as planets. Only one of them – Pluto – has been observed in enough detail to verify that its current shape fits what would be expected from hydrostatic equilibrium. Ceres is close to equilibrium, but some gravitational anomalies remain unexplained. Eris is generally assumed to be a dwarf planet because it is more massive than Pluto.

In order of discovery, these three bodies are:

1. Ceres – discovered January 1, 1801, and announced January 24, 45 years before Neptune. Considered a planet for half a century before reclassification as an asteroid. Considered a dwarf planet by the IAU since the adoption of Resolution 5A on August 24, 2006.
2. Pluto – discovered February 18, 1930, and announced March 13. Considered a planet for 76 years. Explicitly reclassified as a dwarf planet by the IAU with Resolution 6A on August 24, 2006. Five known moons.
3. Eris (2003 UB_{313}) – discovered January 5, 2005, and announced July 29. Called the "tenth planet" in media reports. Considered a dwarf planet by the IAU since the adoption of Resolution 5A on August 24, 2006, and named by the IAU dwarf-planet naming committee on September 13 of that year. One known moon.

The IAU only established guidelines for which committee would oversee the naming of likely dwarf planets: any unnamed trans-Neptunian object with an absolute magnitude brighter than +1 (and hence a minimum diameter of 838 km at the maximum geometric albedo of 1) was to be named by a joint committee consisting of the Minor Planet Center and the planetary working group of the IAU. At the time (and still as of 2025), the only bodies to meet this threshold were Haumea and Makemake. These bodies are generally assumed to be dwarf planets, although they have not yet been demonstrated to be in hydrostatic equilibrium, and there is some disagreement for Haumea:

4. Haumea (2003 EL_{61}) – discovered by Brown et al. December 28, 2004, and announced by Ortiz et al. on July 27, 2005. Named by the IAU dwarf planet naming committee on September 17, 2008. Two known moons and one known ring.
5. Makemake (2005 FY_{9}) – discovered March 31, 2005, and announced July 29. Named by the IAU dwarf planet naming committee on July 11, 2008. One known moon.

These five bodies – the three under consideration in 2006 (Pluto, Ceres and Eris) plus the two named in 2008 (Haumea and Makemake) – are commonly presented as the dwarf planets of the Solar System, though the limiting factor (albedo) is not what defines an object as a dwarf planet.

The astronomical community commonly refers to other larger TNOs as dwarf planets as well. At least four additional bodies meet the preliminary criteria of Brown, of Tancredi et al., of Grundy et al., and of Emery et al. for identifying dwarf planets, and are generally called dwarf planets by astronomers as well:

6. Quaoar (2002 LM_{60}) – discovered June 5, 2002, and announced October 7 of that year. Two known moons and two known rings.
7. Sedna (2003 VB_{12}) – discovered November 14, 2003, and announced March 15, 2004.
8. Orcus (2004 DW) – discovered February 17, 2004, and announced two days later. One known moon.
9. Gonggong (2007 OR_{10}) – discovered July 17, 2007, and announced January 2009. One known moon.

For instance, JPL/NASA called Gonggong a dwarf planet after observations in 2016, and Simon Porter of the Southwest Research Institute spoke of "the big eight [TNO] dwarf planets" in 2018, referring to Pluto, Eris, Haumea, Makemake, Gonggong, Quaoar, Sedna and Orcus. The IAU itself has called Quaoar a dwarf planet in a 2022–2023 annual report.

More bodies have been proposed, such as Salacia and Máni by Brown; Varuna and Ixion by Tancredi et al., and Chiminigagua by Sheppard et al. Most of the larger bodies have moons, which enables a determination of their mass and thus their density, which inform estimates of whether they could be dwarf planets. The largest TNOs that are not known to have moons are Sedna, Máni, Aya, and Ixion. In particular, Salacia has a known mass and diameter, putting it as a borderline case by the IAU's 2006 Q&A.

10. Salacia (2004 SB_{60}) – discovered September 22, 2004. One known moon.

At the time Makemake and Haumea were named, it was thought that trans-Neptunian objects (TNOs) with icy cores would require a diameter of only about 400 km (250 mi), or 3% the size of Earth – the size of the moons Mimas, the smallest moon that is round, and Proteus, the largest that is not – to relax into gravitational equilibrium. Researchers thought that the number of such bodies could prove to be around 200 in the Kuiper belt, with thousands more beyond. This was one of the reasons (keeping the roster of 'planets' to a reasonable number) that Pluto was reclassified in the first place. Research since then has cast doubt on the idea that bodies that small could have achieved or maintained equilibrium under the typical conditions of the Kuiper belt and beyond.

Individual astronomers have recognized a number of objects as dwarf planets or as likely to prove to be dwarf planets. In 2008, Tancredi et al. advised the IAU to officially accept Orcus, Sedna and Quaoar as dwarf planets (Gonggong was not yet known), though the IAU did not address the issue then and has not since. Tancredi also considered the five TNOs Varuna, Ixion, Achlys, Goibniu, and Aya to most likely be dwarf planets as well. Since 2011, Brown has maintained a list of hundreds of candidate objects, ranging from "nearly certain" to "possible" dwarf planets, based solely on estimated size. As of September 13, 2019, Brown's list identifies ten trans-Neptunian objects with diameters then thought to be greater than 900 km (the four named by the IAU plus Gonggong, Quaoar, Sedna, Orcus, Máni, and Salacia) as "near certain" to be dwarf planets, and another 16, with diameter greater than 600 km, as "highly likely". Notably, Gonggong may have a larger diameter (1230±50 km) than Pluto's round moon Charon (1212 km).

But in 2019 Grundy et al. proposed, based on their studies of Gǃkúnǁʼhòmdímà, that dark, low-density bodies smaller than about 900–1000 km in diameter, such as Salacia and Varda, never fully collapsed into solid planetary bodies and retain internal porosity from their formation (in which case they could not be dwarf planets). They accept that brighter (albedo > ≈0.2) or denser (> ≈1.4 g/cm³) Orcus and Quaoar probably were fully solid:

Orcus and Charon probably melted and differentiated, considering their higher densities and spectra indicating surfaces made of relatively clean H_{2}O ice. But the lower albedos and densities of Gǃkúnǁʼhòmdímà, 55637 (Uni), Varda, and Salacia suggest that they never did differentiate, or if they did, it was only in their deep interiors, not a complete melting and overturning that involved the surface. Their surfaces could remain quite cold and uncompressed even as the interior becomes warm and collapses. The liberation of volatiles could further help transport heat out of their interiors, limiting the extent of their internal collapse. An object with a cold, relatively pristine surface and a partially collapsed interior should exhibit very distinctive surface geology, with abundant thrust faults indicative of the reduction in total surface area as the interior compresses and shrinks.

Salacia was later found to have a somewhat higher density, comparable within uncertainties to that of Orcus, though still with a very dark surface. Despite this determination, Grundy et al. call it "dwarf-planet sized", while calling Orcus a dwarf planet. Later studies on Varda suggest that its density may also be high, though a low density could not be excluded.

In 2023, Emery et al. wrote that near-infrared spectroscopy by the James Webb Space Telescope (JWST) in 2022 suggests that Sedna, Gonggong, and Quaoar underwent internal melting, differentiation, and chemical evolution, like the larger dwarf planets Pluto, Eris, Haumea, and Makemake, but unlike "all smaller KBOs". This is because light hydrocarbons are present on their surfaces (e.g. ethane, acetylene, and ethylene), which implies that methane is continuously being resupplied, and that methane would likely come from internal geochemistry. On the other hand, the surfaces of Sedna, Gonggong, and Quaoar have low abundances of CO and CO_{2}, similar to Pluto, Eris, and Makemake, but in contrast to smaller bodies. This suggests that the threshold for dwarf planethood in the trans-Neptunian region is a diameter of ~900 km (thus including only Pluto, Eris, Haumea, Makemake, Gonggong, Quaoar, Orcus, and Sedna), and that even Salacia may not be a dwarf planet. A 2023 study of Máni shows that it probably has an extremely large crater, whose depth takes up 5.7% of its diameter: this is proportionally larger than the Rheasilvia crater on Vesta, which is the reason Vesta is not usually considered a dwarf planet today.

In 2024, Kiss et al. found that Quaoar has an ellipsoidal shape incompatible with hydrostatic equilibrium for its current spin. They hypothesized that Quaoar originally had a rapid rotation and was in hydrostatic equilibrium, but that its shape became "frozen in" and did not change as it spun down due to tidal forces from its moon Weywot. If so, this would resemble the situation of Saturn's moon Iapetus, which is too oblate for its current spin. Iapetus is generally still considered a planetary-mass moon nonetheless, though not always.

=== Most likely dwarf planets ===
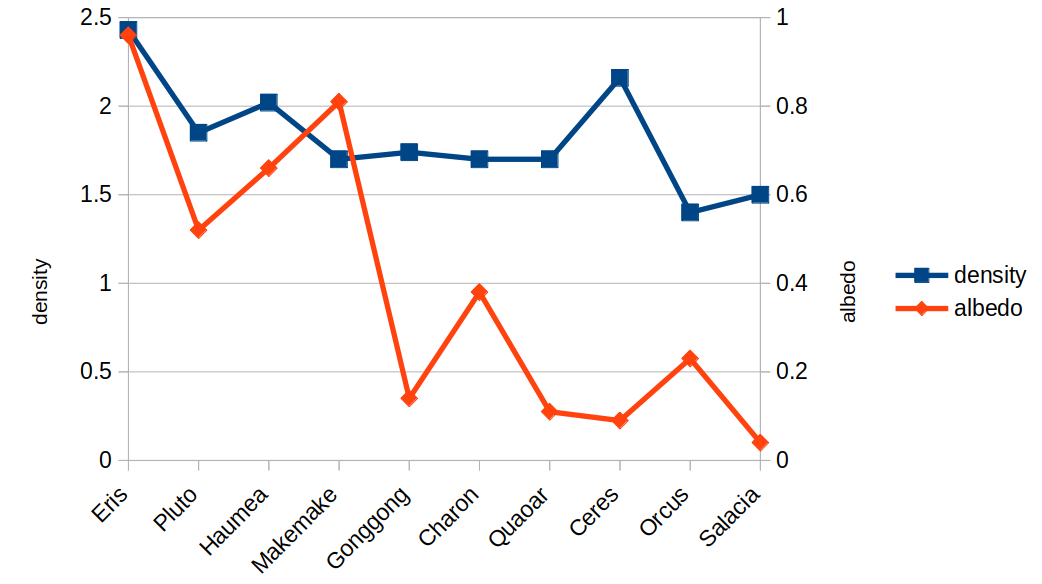
Relative densities and albedos of the most likely dwarf planets

The trans-Neptunian objects in the following tables, except Salacia, are agreed by Brown, Tancredi et al., Grundy et al., and Emery et al. to be probable dwarf planets, or close to it. Salacia has been included as the largest TNO not generally agreed to be a dwarf planet; it is a borderline body by many criteria, and is therefore italicized. Charon, a moon of Pluto that was proposed as a dwarf planet by the IAU in 2006, is included for comparison. Those objects that have absolute magnitude greater than +1, and so meet the threshold of the joint planet–minor planet naming committee of the IAU, are highlighted, as is Ceres, which the IAU has assumed is a dwarf planet since they first debated the concept.

The masses of given dwarf planets are listed for their systems (if they have satellites) with exceptions for Pluto and Orcus.

Orbital attributes
Name	Region of the Solar System	Semi-major axis (AU)	Orbital period (years)	Mean orbital speed (km/s)	Inclination to ecliptic	Orbital eccentricity	Planetary discriminant
Ceres	Asteroid belt	2.768	4.604	17.90	10.59°	0.079	0.3
Orcus	Kuiper belt (resonant – 2:3)	39.40	247.3	4.75	20.58°	0.220	0.003
Pluto	Kuiper belt (resonant – 2:3)	39.48	247.9	4.74	17.16°	0.249	0.08
Salacia	Kuiper belt (cubewano)	42.18	274.0	4.57	23.92°	0.106	0.003
Haumea	Kuiper belt (resonant – 7:12)	43.22	284.1	4.53	28.19°	0.191	0.02
Quaoar	Kuiper belt (cubewano)	43.69	288.8	4.51	7.99°	0.040	0.007
Makemake	Kuiper belt (cubewano)	45.56	307.5	4.41	28.98°	0.158	0.02
Gonggong	Scattered disc (resonant – 3:10)	67.49	554.4	3.63	30.74°	0.503	0.01
Eris	Scattered disc	67.86	559.1	3.62	44.04°	0.441	0.1
Sedna	Detached	506.8	≈ 11,400	≈ 1.3	11.93°	0.855	< 0.07

Other attributes
Name	Diameter relative to the Moon	Diameter (km)	Mass relative to the Moon	Mass (×10^{21} kg)	Density (g/cm^{3})	Rotation period (hours)	Moons	Albedo	H
Ceres	27%	939.4±0.2	1.3%	0.93835±0.00001	2.1616±0.0025	9.1	0	0.09	3.33
Orcus	26%	910+50 −40	0.8%	0.55±0.01 (Note: using the most precise value of Vanth's estimated mass of (8.7±0.8)×10^{19} kg)	1.4±0.2	10.5?	1	0.23+0.02 −0.01	2.19
Pluto	68%	2376.6±1.6	17.7%	13.03±0.01	1.85	6d 9.3h	5	0.52	−0.45
(Charon)	35%	1212±1	2.2%	1.59±0.01	1.70±0.01	6d 9.3h	–	0.38	1
Salacia	24%	838±44	0.7%	0.486±0.07	1.50±0.12	5 d 11.9 h	1	0.04	4.27
Haumea	≈ 45%	1544+40 −38 km	5.5%	3.952±0.011	2.050±0.15	3.9	2	≈ 0.66	0.23
Quaoar	32%	1115.7±9.4	1.9%	1.21±0.01	1.667±0.043	17.7	1 (2?)	0.11±0.01	2.42
Makemake	41%	1430±14	3.7%	2.69±0.20	1.76±0.17	22.8	1	0.81+0.03 −0.05	−0.20
Gonggong	35%	1230±50	2.4%	1.75±0.07	1.74±0.16	22.4±0.2?	1	0.14±0.01	1.86
Eris	67%	2326±12	22.4%	16.38±0.14	2.43±0.05	15d 18.9h	1	0.96±0.04	−1.21
Sedna	26%	906+314 −258	≈ 1%?	≈ 1?	?	10.3?	0?	0.41+0.393 −0.186	1.52

=== Symbols ===
Ceres and Pluto received planetary symbols, as they were considered to be planets when they were discovered. By the time the others were discovered, planetary symbols had mostly fallen out of use among astronomers. Unicode includes symbols for Quaoar , Sedna , Orcus , Haumea , Eris , Makemake , and Gonggong , that are primarily used by astrologers: they were devised by Denis Moskowitz, a software engineer in Massachusetts. NASA has used his Haumea, Eris, and Makemake symbols, as well as the traditional astrological symbol for Pluto when referring to it as a dwarf planet. Symbols for smaller objects are less established; a Unicode proposal notes the Moskowitz symbol for Salacia. Moskowitz additionally devised a symbol for Charon.

== Exploration ==
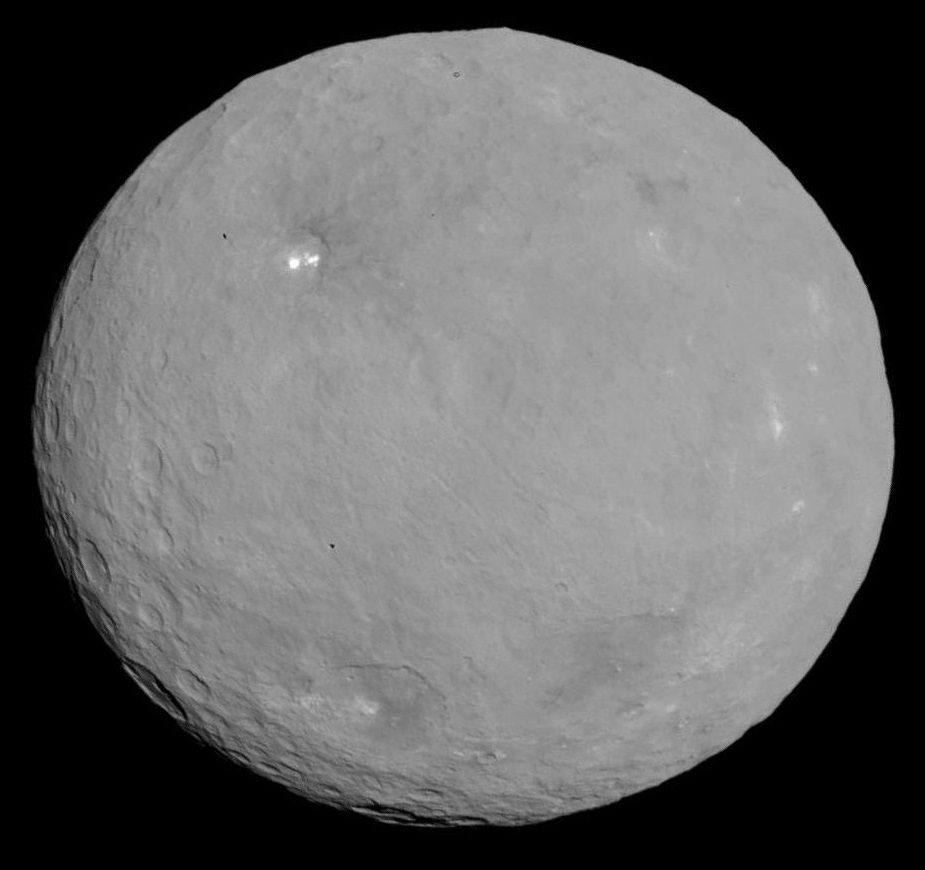
The dwarf planet Ceres, as imaged by NASA's Dawn spacecraft

As of 2025, only two missions have targeted and explored dwarf planets up close. On March 6, 2015, the Dawn spacecraft entered orbit around Ceres, becoming the first spacecraft to visit a dwarf planet. On July 14, 2015, the New Horizons space probe flew by Pluto and its five moons.

Ceres displays such evidence of an active geology as salt deposits and cryovolcanos, while Pluto has water-ice mountains drifting in nitrogen-ice glaciers, as well as a significant atmosphere. Ceres evidently has brine percolating through its subsurface, while there is evidence that Pluto has an actual subsurface ocean.

Dawn had previously orbited the asteroid Vesta. Saturn's moon Phoebe has been imaged by Cassini and before that by Voyager 2, which also encountered Neptune's moon Triton. All three bodies show evidence of once being dwarf planets, and their exploration helps clarify the evolution of dwarf planets.

New Horizons has captured distant images of Triton, Quaoar, Haumea, Eris, and Makemake, as well as the smaller candidates Ixion, Máni, and 2014 OE_{394}. Quaoar has been proposed as a potential flyby target of the China National Space Administration's two Shensuo probes.

== Similar objects ==
A number of bodies physically resemble dwarf planets. These include former dwarf planets, which may still have equilibrium shape or evidence of active geology; planetary-mass moons, which meet the physical but not the orbital definition for dwarf planet; and Charon in the Pluto–Charon system, which is arguably a binary dwarf planet. The categories may overlap: Triton, for example, is both a former dwarf planet and a planetary-mass moon.

=== Former dwarf planets ===
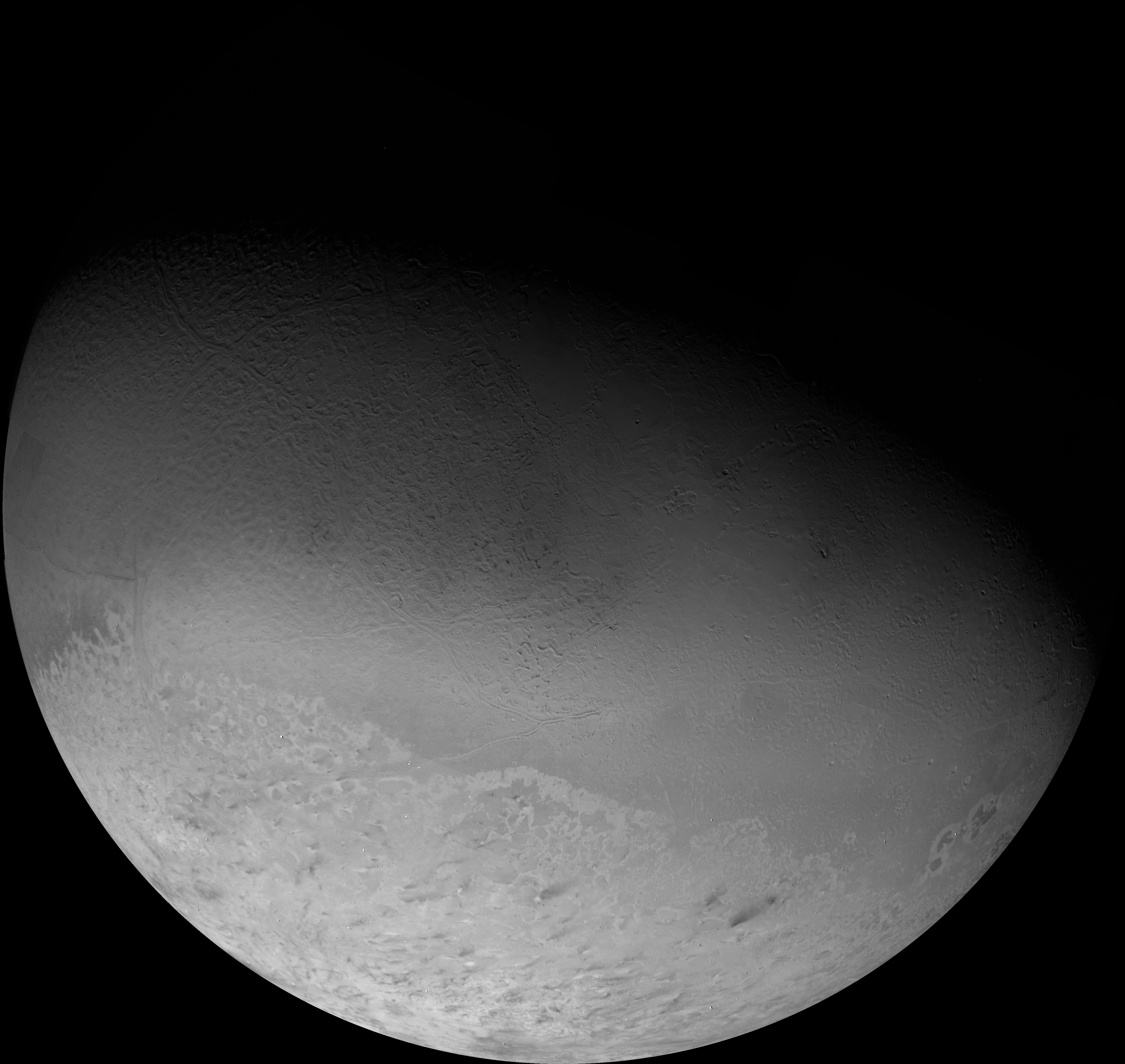
A monochrome mosaic of Triton, from images by Voyager 2. Triton is thought to be a captured dwarf planet.

Vesta, the next-most-massive body in the asteroid belt after Ceres, was once in hydrostatic equilibrium and is roughly spheroidal, deviating mainly due to massive impacts that formed the Rheasilvia and Veneneia craters after it solidified. Its dimensions are not consistent with it currently being in hydrostatic equilibrium. Triton is more massive than Eris or Pluto and has an equilibrium shape. It is thought to be a former dwarf planet (likely a member of a binary system) that was captured by Neptune early in the Solar System's history into its retrograde orbit. Phoebe is a captured centaur that, like Vesta, is no longer in hydrostatic equilibrium, but is thought to have been so early in its history due to radiogenic heating.

=== Planetary-mass moons ===
At least nineteen moons have equilibrium shapes from having collapsed into a solid body (or in a few cases into a nearly solid body) or even relaxed under self-gravity at some point, though some of the latter have since frozen solid and are no longer in equilibrium. Seven are more massive than either Eris or Pluto. These larger moons are not physically distinct from the dwarf planets, but do not fit the IAU definition because they do not directly orbit the Sun. Neptune's moon Triton (considered a captured dwarf planet), and Ceres are both considered to have been formed in the same region of the Solar System as the moons of Jupiter and Saturn yet differ in classification. Recent studies though suggest that Ceres might be native to the asteroid belt itself. Alan Stern calls planetary-mass moons "satellite planets", one of three categories of planet, together with dwarf planets and classical planets. The term planemo ("planetary-mass object") also covers all three populations.

==== Charon ====
There has been some debate as to whether the Pluto–Charon system should be considered a double dwarf planet. In a draft resolution for the IAU definition of planet, both Pluto and Charon were considered planets in a binary system. (Note: The footnote in the original text reads: "For two or more objects comprising a multiple object system. ... A secondary object satisfying these conditions i.e. that of mass, shape is also designated a planet if the system barycentre resides outside the primary. Secondary objects not satisfying these criteria are "satellites". Under this definition, Pluto's companion Charon is a planet, making Pluto–Charon a double planet.") The IAU currently says Charon is not considered a dwarf planet but rather a satellite of Pluto, though the idea that Charon might qualify as a dwarf planet may be considered at a later date. Nonetheless, it is no longer clear that Charon is in hydrostatic equilibrium. Also, the location of the barycentre depends not only on the relative masses of the bodies, but also on the distance between them; the barycentre of the Sun–Jupiter orbit, for example, lies outside the Sun, but they are not considered a binary object. Thus, a formal definition of what constitutes a binary (dwarf) planet must be established before Pluto and Charon are formally defined as binary dwarf planets.

== See also ==
- Centaur
- Lists of astronomical objects
- List of former planets
- List of gravitationally rounded objects of the Solar System
- List of planetary bodies
- List of possible dwarf planets
- Lists of small Solar System bodies
