= Quaoar =

Ringed dwarf planet in the Kuiper belt

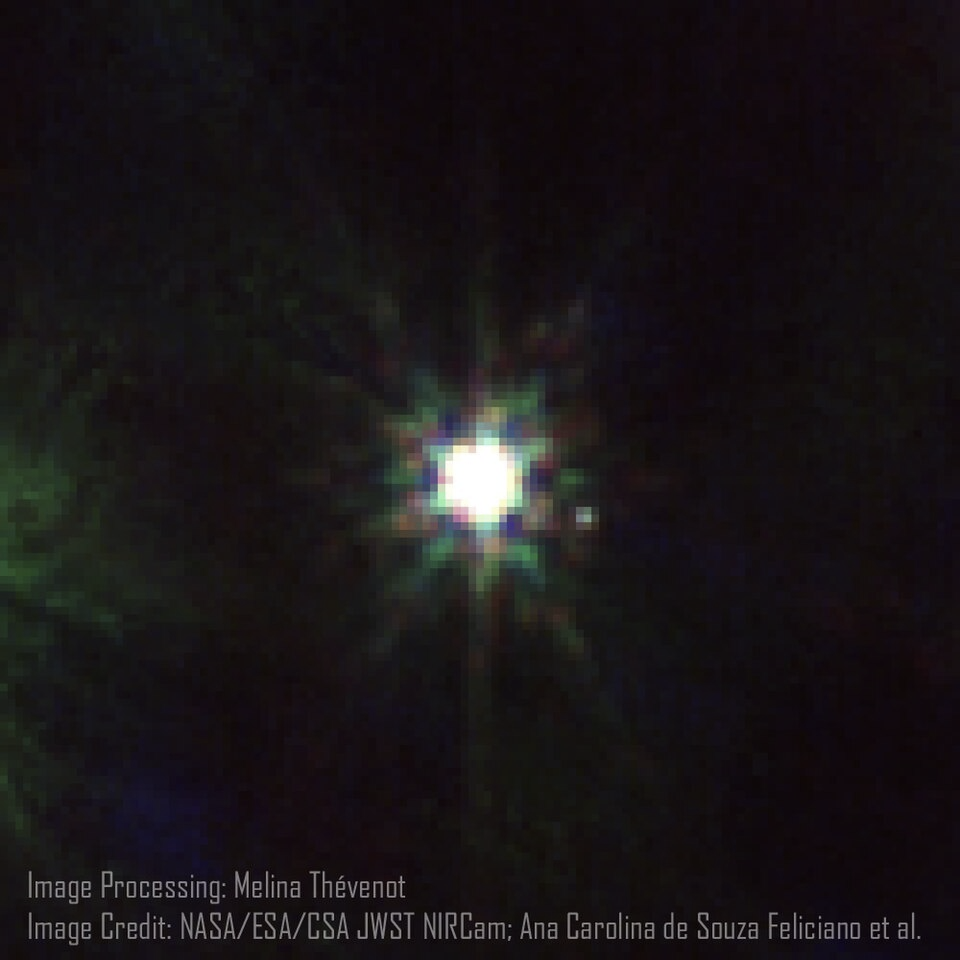
- Low-resolution infared image of Quaoar as taken by the James Webb Space Telescope's NIRCam

Discovery
- Discovered by: Chadwick A. Trujillo; Michael E. Brown
- Discovery site: Palomar Observatory
- Discovery date: 4 June 2002

Designations
- Pronunciation: /ˈkwɑːwɑːr/, /ˈkwɑː.oʊ.ɑːr/
- Named after: Qua-o-ar / Kwawar (deity of the Tongva people)
- Alternative designations: (50000) Quaoar; 2002 LM_{60}
- Minor planet category: TNO · classical (hot); distant · dwarf planet
- Symbol: (mostly astrological)

Orbital characteristics (barycentric) (Note: These orbital elements are expressed in terms of the Solar System Barycenter (SSB) as the frame of reference. Due to planetary perturbations, the Sun revolves around the SSB at non-negligible distances, so heliocentric-frame orbital elements and distances (such as those given in JPL's Small-Body Database) can vary on short timescales.)
- Epoch 21 November 2025 (JD 2461000.5)
- Uncertainty parameter 0
- Observation arc: 71+ yr
- Earliest precovery date: 25 May 1954
- Aphelion: 44.935 AU (6.7222 Tm)
- Perihelion: 41.735 AU (6.2435 Tm)
- Semi-major axis: 43.335 AU (6.4828 Tm)
- Eccentricity: 0.0369
- Orbital period (sidereal): 285.08 yr (104,127 d)
- Mean anomaly: 301.290°
- Mean motion: 0° 0^{m} 12.446^{s} / day
- Inclination: 7.991°
- Longitude of ascending node: 188.913°
- Time of perihelion: 11 February 2075
- Argument of perihelion: 157.556°
- Known satellites: 1 confirmed (Weywot); 1 unconfirmed

Physical characteristics
- Dimensions: 1241.4+6.6 −5.6 km × 1093.0+12.0 −11.2 km × 1023.0+10.6 −11.0 km
- Mean diameter: 1115.7±9.4 km (volume equivalent)
- Flattening: 0.120±0.006 (average) (Note: The value of 0.120±0.006 (listed in Table 3 of Margoti et al. 2026) is the average of Quaoar's polar oblatenesses along its two equatorial axes (a-c oblateness is 0.176±0.005, a-b oblateness is 0.064±0.003))
- Surface area: 3.93×10^{6} km^{2}
- Volume: 7.27×10^{8} km^{3}
- Mass: (1.212±0.005)×10^{21} kg
- Mean density: 1.667±0.043 g/cm^{3} (Note: The density value of ρ = 1.667±0.043 g/cm^{3} is calculated via the formula $\rho {{=}} \frac{M}{V} {{=}} \frac{M}{\frac{4}{3} \pi R^3}$, where M = (1.212±0.005)×10^{21} kg is Quaoar's mass from Proudfoot et al. (2025). and R = 557.8±4.7 km is the volume-equivalent radius from Margoti et al.'s 2026 paper on modeling Quaoar as an ellipsoid. The uncertainty of the density is calculated via propagation of uncertainty. This density had to be manually calculated since Margoti et al. (2026) used an outdated Quaoar mass ((1.208±0.063)×10^{21} kg) from Braga-Ribas et al. (2025).); 1.663±0.127 g/cm^{3} (Note: The density value of 1.663±0.127 g/cm^{3} comes from Margoti et al.'s 2026 paper on modeling Quaoar as an ellipsoid, which uses an outdated Quaoar mass value of (1.208±0.063)×10^{21} kg from Braga-Ribas et al. (2025).)
- Equatorial surface gravity: 0.31 m/s^{2} at poles (Note: The surface gravity in meters per second squared (m/s^{2}) is calculated according to $\frac{GM}{r^2}$, where G = 6.6743×10^{−11} m^{3}⋅kg^{−1}⋅s^{−2} is the gravitational constant, M is Quaoar's mass in kilograms, and r is Quaoar's radius in meters.); to 0.21 m/s^{2} at longest axis
- Equatorial escape velocity: 0.56 km/s at poles (Note: The surface escape velocity in meters per second (m/s) is calculated according to $v_{esc} = \sqrt{\frac{2GM}{r}}$, where G = 6.6743×10^{−11} m^{3}⋅kg^{−1}⋅s^{−2} is the gravitational constant, M is Quaoar's mass in kilograms, and r is Quaoar's radius in meters.); to 0.51 km/s at longest axis
- Synodic rotation period: 17.6792+0.0214 −0.0186 h (2026); 17.6788±0.0004 h (2003)
- Axial tilt: ≈ 14.4° to ecliptic (Note: Table 4 of Margoti et al. (2026) give Quaoar's north pole direction in terms of equatorial coordinates (α, δ) = (259.6°, +53.1°), where α is right ascension and δ is declination. Transforming these equatorial coordinates to ecliptic coordinates gives λ ≈ 244.15° and β ≈ +75.61°. The ecliptic latitude, β, is the angular offset from the ecliptic plane, whereas inclination i with respect to the ecliptic is the angular offset from the ecliptic north pole at β = +90° ; i with respect to the ecliptic would be the complement of β, which is expressed by the difference i = 90° – β. Thus, the axial tilt of Quaoar's rings is approximately 14.39° with respect to the ecliptic.)
- North pole right ascension: 259.6°+0.6° −0.7°
- North pole declination: +53.1°±0.1°
- Geometric albedo: 0.111±0.012 (geometric); 0.057±0.005 (Bond)
- Temperature: ≈ 44 K
- Spectral type: IR (moderately red); B–V = 0.94±0.01; V−R = 0.64±0.01; V−I = 1.28±0.02
- Apparent magnitude: 19.0
- Absolute magnitude (H): 2.737±0.008; 2.41; 2.39
- Angular diameter: 40.4±1.8 milliarcseconds

Quaoar (minor-planet number 50000) is a ringed dwarf planet in the Kuiper belt, a band of icy planetesimals beyond Neptune. It has an ellipsoidal shape with an average diameter of about 1,100 km (680 mi), about half the size of the dwarf planet Pluto. The object was discovered by American astronomers Chad Trujillo and Michael Brown at Palomar Observatory on 4 June 2002. Quaoar has a reddish surface made of crystalline water ice, tholins, and traces of frozen methane.

Quaoar has two thin rings orbiting outside its Roche limit, which defies theoretical expectations that rings outside the Roche limit should be unstable. Quaoar has one moon named Weywot and a potential second moon that has not yet been confirmed. It is believed that Quaoar's elongated shape, gravitational influence of its moon(s), and extremely cold temperature help keep its rings stable.

== History ==
=== Discovery ===
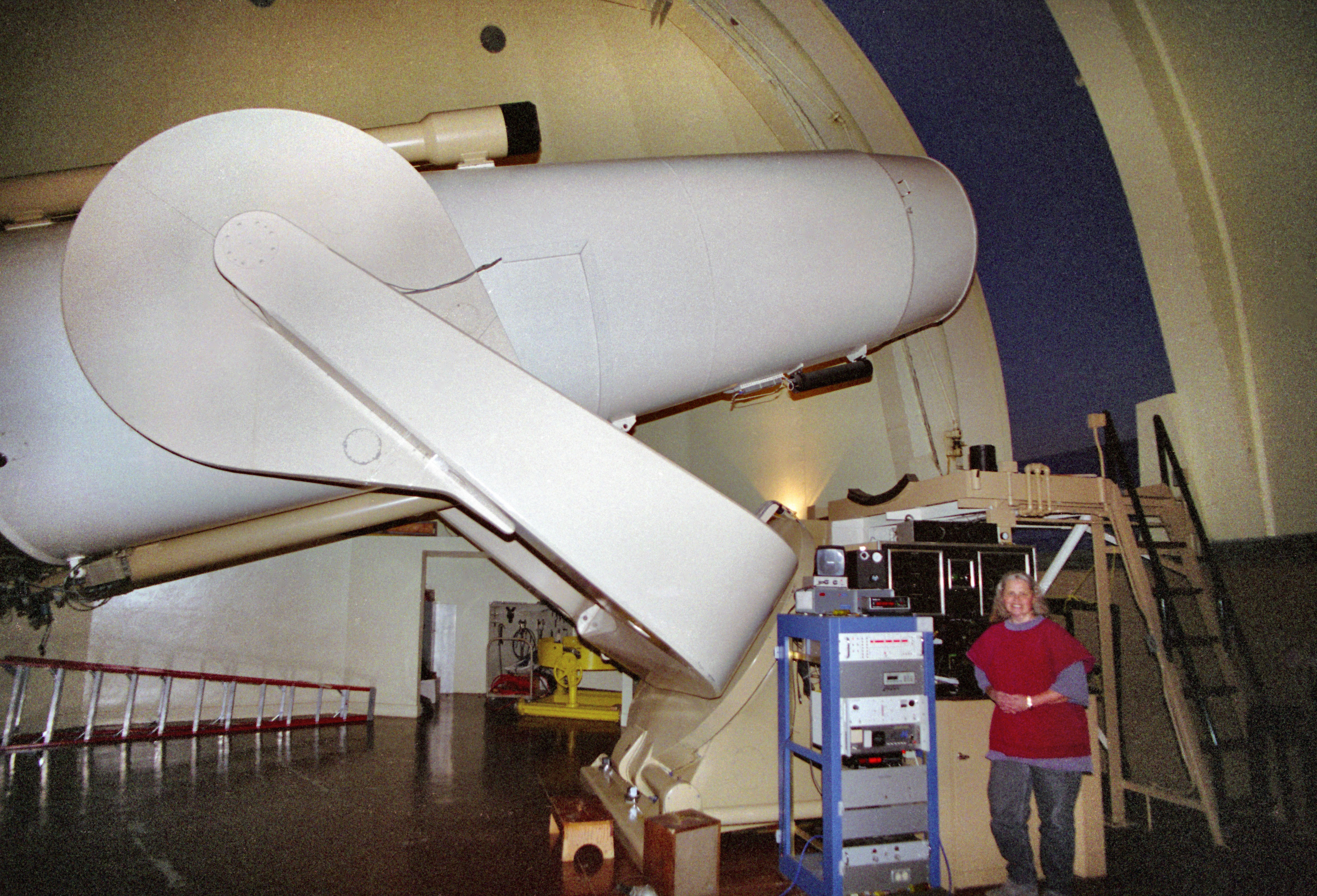
Quaoar was discovered using the Samuel Oschin telescope at Palomar Observatory

Quaoar was discovered on 4 June 2002 by American astronomers Chad Trujillo and Michael Brown at the Palomar Observatory in the Palomar Mountain Range in San Diego County, California. The discovery formed part of the Caltech Wide Area Sky Survey, which was designed to search for the brightest Kuiper belt objects using the Palomar Observatory's 1.22-meter Samuel Oschin telescope. Quaoar was first identified in images by Trujillo on 5 June 2002, when he noticed a dim, 18.6-magnitude object slowly moving among the stars of the constellation Ophiuchus. Quaoar appeared relatively bright for a distant object, suggesting that it could have a size comparable to the diameter of Pluto.

To ascertain Quaoar's orbit, Brown and Trujillo initiated a search for archival precovery images. They obtained several precovery images taken by the Near-Earth Asteroid Tracking survey from various observatories in 1996 and 2000–2002. In particular, they had also found two archival photographic plates taken by astronomer Charles T. Kowal in May 1983, who at the time was searching for the hypothesized Planet X at the Palomar Observatory. From these precovery images, Brown and Trujillo were able to calculate Quaoar's orbit and distance. Additional precovery images of Quaoar have been later identified, with the earliest known found by Edward Rhoads on a photographic plate imaged on 25 May 1954 from the Palomar Observatory Sky Survey.

Before announcing the discovery of Quaoar, Brown had planned to conduct follow-up observations using the Hubble Space Telescope to measure Quaoar's size. He had also planned to announce the discovery as soon as possible and found it necessary to keep the discovery information confidential during the follow-up observations. Rather than submitting his Hubble proposal under peer review, Brown submitted his proposal directly to one of Hubble's operators, who promptly allocated time to Brown. While setting up the observing algorithm for Hubble, Brown had also planned to use one of the Keck telescopes in Mauna Kea, Hawaii, as a part of a study on cryovolcanism on the moons of Uranus. This provided him additional time for follow-up observations and took advantage of the whole observing session in July to analyze Quaoar's spectrum and characterize its surface composition.

The discovery of Quaoar was formally announced by the Minor Planet Center in a Minor Planet Electronic Circular on 7 October 2002. It was given the provisional designation 2002 LM_{60}, indicating that its discovery took place during the first half of June 2002. Quaoar was the 1,512th object discovered in the first half of June, as indicated by the preceding letter and numbers in its provisional designation. (Note: In the convention for minor planet provisional designations, the first letter represents the half-month of the year of discovery while the second letter and numbers indicate the order of discovery within that half-month. In the case for 2002 LM_{60}, the first letter 'L' corresponds to the first half-month of June 2002 while the preceding letter 'M' indicates that it is the 12th object discovered on the 61st cycle of discoveries (with 60 cycles completed). Each completed cycle consists of 25 letters representing discoveries, hence 12 + (60 completed cycles × 25 letters) = 1,512.) On that same day, Trujillo and Brown reported their scientific results from observations of Quaoar at the 34th annual meeting of the American Astronomical Society's Division for Planetary Sciences in Birmingham, Alabama. They announced Quaoar was the largest Kuiper belt object found yet, surpassing previous record holders 20000 Varuna and 55565 Aya. Quaoar's discovery has been cited by Brown as having contributed to the reclassification of Pluto as a dwarf planet. Since then, Brown has contributed to the discovery of larger trans-Neptunian objects, including Haumea, Eris, Makemake and Gonggong.

On 20 November 2002, Quaoar was given the minor planet number 50000, a deliberate choice highlighting its unusual size and the fact that it was discovered during the search for Pluto-sized objects in the Kuiper belt. Likewise, the large Kuiper belt object Varuna had previously received the round number 20000 to mark a similar milestone, and there had even been plans to give a round number to Pluto itself. However, Pluto later received the number 134340, and other large discoveries such as 136199 Eris were assigned numbers in the order in which their orbits were confirmed.

=== Name and symbol ===
Upon Quaoar's discovery, it was initially given the temporary nickname "Object X" as a reference to Planet X, due to its potentially large size and unknown nature. At the time, Quaoar's size was uncertain, and its brightness led the discovery team to speculate that it may be a tenth planet. After measuring Quaoar's size with the Hubble Space Telescope in July, the team began considering names for the object, particularly those from local Native American mythologies. Following the International Astronomical Union's (IAU) naming convention for minor planets, non-resonant Kuiper belt objects are to be named after creation deities. The team settled on the name Kwawar, the creator god of the Tongva people indigenous to the Los Angeles Basin, where Brown's institute, the California Institute of Technology, was located.

According to Brown, the name "Quaoar" is pronounced with three syllables, and Trujillo's website on Quaoar gives a three-syllable pronunciation, /ˈkwɑːoʊ(w)ɑːr/, as an approximation of the Tongva pronunciation [ˈkʷaʔuwar]. The name can be also pronounced as two syllables, /ˈkwɑːwɑːr/, reflecting the usual English spelling and pronunciation of the deity Kwawar.

In Tongva mythology, Kwawar is the genderless creation force of the universe, singing and dancing deities into existence. They first sing and dance to create Weywot (Sky Father), then they together sing Chehooit (Earth Mother) and Tamit (Grandfather Sun) into existence. As they did this, the creation force became more complex as each new deity joined the singing and dancing. Eventually, after reducing chaos to order, they created the seven great giants that upheld the world, then the animals and finally the first man and woman, Tobohar and Pahavit.

Upon their investigation of names from Tongva mythology, Brown and Trujillo realized that there were contemporary members of the Tongva people, whom they contacted for permission to use the name. They consulted tribal historian Marc Acuña, who confirmed that the name Kwawar would indeed be an appropriate name for the newly discovered object. However, the Tongva preferred the spelling Qua-o-ar, which Brown and Trujillo adopted, though with the hyphens omitted. The name and discovery of Quaoar were publicly announced in October, though Brown had not sought approval of the name by the IAU's Committee on Small Body Nomenclature (CSBN). Indeed, Quaoar's name was announced before the official numbering of the object, which Brian Marsden—the head of the Minor Planet Center—remarked in 2004 to be a violation of the protocol. Despite this, the name was approved by the CSBN, and the naming citation, along with Quaoar's official numbering, was published in a Minor Planet Circular on 20 November 2002.

The usage of planetary symbols is no longer recommended in astronomy, so Quaoar never received a symbol in the astronomical literature. A symbol ⟨⟩, used mostly among astrologers, is included in Unicode as U+1F77E. The symbol was designed by Denis Moskowitz, a software engineer in Massachusetts; it combines the letter Q (for 'Quaoar') with a canoe, and is stylized to recall angular Tongva rock art.

== Orbit and classification ==
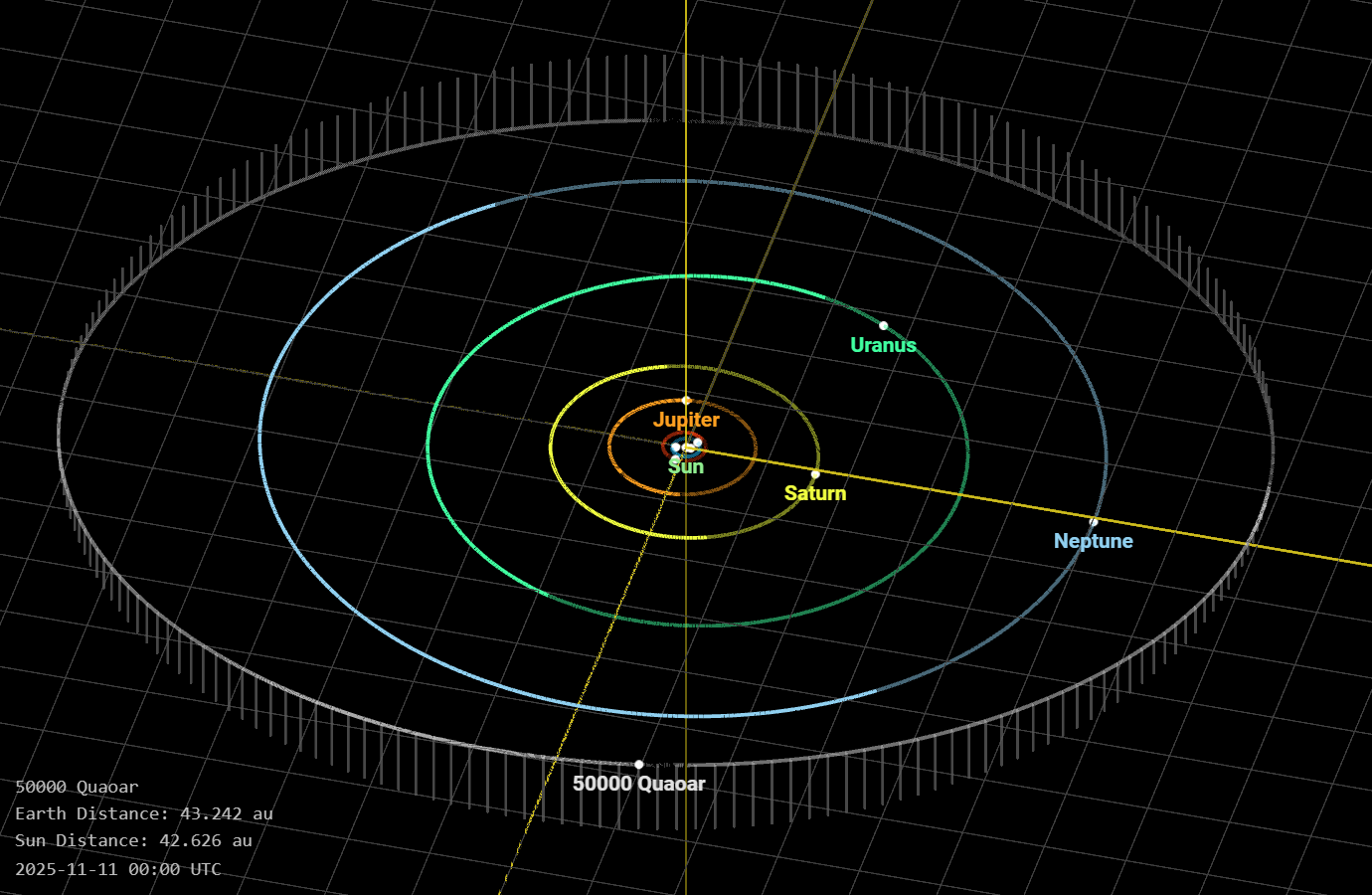
Diagram showing Quaoar's orbit (gray) around the Sun, with the outer planets shown. The vertical gray lines along Quaoar's orbital path mark its positions above and below the ecliptic plane.

Quaoar orbits the Sun at an average distance of 43.3 AU (6.48 billion km; 4.02 billion mi), taking 285 years to complete one full orbit around the Sun. With an orbital eccentricity of about 0.04, Quaoar follows a nearly circular orbit, only slightly varying in distance from 42 AU at perihelion to 45 AU at aphelion. At such distances, light from the Sun takes more than 5 hours to reach Quaoar. Quaoar will reach perihelion on 11 February 2075.

Because Quaoar has a nearly circular orbit, it does not approach close to Neptune such that its orbit can become significantly perturbed under the gravitational influence of Neptune. Quaoar's minimum orbit intersection distance from Neptune is about 12 AU—it does not approach Neptune within this distance over the course of its orbit. Quaoar is also not in a mean-motion orbital resonance with Neptune. Simulations by the Deep Ecliptic Survey show that the perihelion and aphelion distances of Quaoar's orbit do not change significantly over the next ten million years; Quaoar's orbit appears to be stable over the long term.

Quaoar is a trans-Neptunian object. It is classified as a distant minor planet by the Minor Planet Center. Because Quaoar is not in a mean-motion resonance with Neptune, it is also classified as a classical Kuiper belt object (cubewano) by the Minor Planet Center and Deep Ecliptic Survey. Quaoar's orbit is moderately inclined to the ecliptic plane by 8°, relatively high when compared to the inclinations of Kuiper belt objects within the dynamically cold population. Because Quaoar's orbital inclination is greater than 4°, it is part of the dynamically hot population of high-inclination classical Kuiper belt objects. The high inclinations of hot classical Kuiper belt objects such as Quaoar are thought to have resulted from gravitational scattering by Neptune during its outward migration in the early Solar System.

== Physical characteristics ==
=== Size and shape ===
History of diameter estimates for Quaoar
Year	Diameter (km)	Method	References
2004	1,260±190	imaging	
2007	844+207 −190	thermal	
2010	890±70	thermal/imaging	
2013	1,074±138	thermal	
2013	1,110±5	occultation	
2023	1,086±4	occultation	
2024	1,090±40	thermal/occultation	
2025	1,097.6±2.2	occultation	
2026	1,115.7±9.4	occultation	

Quaoar's shape is most likely an elongated triaxial ellipsoid with dimensions 1,241.4 km × 1,093.0 km × 1,023.0 km (771.4 mi × 679.2 mi × 635.7 mi), corresponding to a volume equivalent diameter of 1,115.7 km (693.3 mi). Quaoar's diameter is roughly half that of Pluto and is slightly smaller than Pluto's moon Charon. At the time of its discovery in 2002, Quaoar was the largest object found in the Solar System since the discovery of Pluto.

Quaoar's elongated shape was measured from two major sources of evidence: large brightness variations throughout its rotation, and slight changes in its shape seen in stellar occultation observations from 2011 to 2025. Although a symmetrical oblate spheroid shape for Quaoar could alternatively fit the occultation data, it could not explain the dwarf planet's large brightness variations unless Quaoar somehow has a dark hemisphere resembling Saturn's moon Iapetus (an exotic scenario considered unlikely). Since an ellipsoid shape explains both brightness and occultation data, it is considered the most likely description of Quaoar.

Although Quaoar is massive enough to be gravitationally rounded by hydrostatic equilibrium, its elongated shape contradicts theoretical expectations. Slowly-rotating objects in hydrostatic equilibrium are expected to be oblate spheroids (Maclaurin spheroids), whereas rapidly-rotating objects in hydrostatic equilibrium, such as Haumea which rotates in nearly 4 hours, are expected to be flattened and elongated ellipsoids (Jacobi ellipsoids). To explain Quaoar's non-equilibrium shape, Csaba Kiss and collaborators hypothesized in 2024 that Quaoar originally had a rapid rotation and was in hydrostatic equilibrium, but its shape became "frozen in" and did not change as Quaoar spun down due to tidal forces from its moon Weywot. This would resemble the situation of Saturn's moon Iapetus, which is too oblate for its current rotation rate.

=== Mass, density, and interior ===
The rotation of Quaoar's ellipsoidal shape causes its brightness to vary over time, as shown in this animated rendering.

Quaoar has a mass of 1.212×10^{21} kg, which was determined from the orbit of its moon Weywot. Measurements of Quaoar's diameter and mass indicate it has a bulk density of about 1.7 g/cm^{3}, which implies a rock and ice composition. Quaoar's large size and density suggest that it likely underwent differentiation, where its interior melted and organized into layers. Because of this, Quaoar is expected to have a rocky core surrounded by an icy shell.

Quaoar's density was previously thought to be much higher, between 2–4 g/cm^{3}, because early measurements inaccurately suggested that Quaoar had a smaller diameter and a higher mass. These early high-density estimated led researchers to speculate that Quaoar might be a rocky planetary core exposed by a large impact event, but these ideas have since become obsolete as newer estimates indicate a lower density.

=== Surface ===
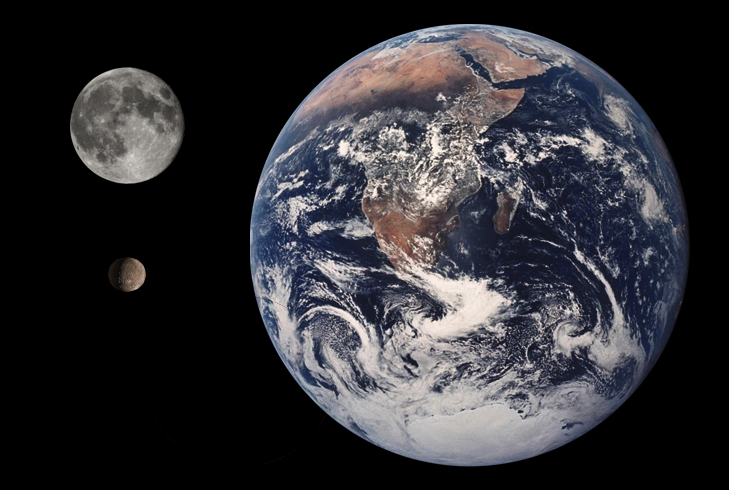
Quaoar compared to the Earth and the Moon

Quaoar has a dark surface that reflects about 11% of the visible light it receives from the Sun. This may indicate that fresh ice has disappeared from Quaoar's surface. The surface is moderately red, meaning that Quaoar reflects longer (redder) wavelengths of light more than shorter (bluer) wavelengths. Many Kuiper belt objects such as 20000 Varuna and 28978 Ixion share a similar moderately red color.

Spectroscopic observations by David C. Jewitt and Jane Luu in 2004 revealed crystalline water ice and tentative hints of ammonia hydrate on Quaoar's surface. These substances are expected to gradually break down due to solar and cosmic radiation, and crystalline water ice can only form in warm temperatures of at least 110 K (−163 °C), so the presence of crystalline water ice on Quaoar's surface indicates that it was heated to this temperature sometime in the last ten million years. For context, Quaoar's present-day surface temperature is less than 50 K (−223.2 °C). Jewitt and Luu proposed two hypotheses for Quaoar's heating, which are impact events and radiogenic heating. The latter hypothesis allows for the possibility of cryovolcanism on Quaoar. A 2006 study by Hauke Hussmann and collaborators suggested that radiogenic heating alone may not be capable of sustaining an internal ocean of liquid water at Quaoar's mantle–core boundary.

More precise observations of Quaoar's near infrared spectrum in 2007 indicated the presence of small quantities (5%) of solid methane and ethane. Given its boiling point of 112 K (−161 °C), methane is a volatile ice at average surface temperatures of Quaoar, unlike water ice or ethane. Both models and observations suggest that only a few larger bodies (Pluto, Eris and Makemake) can retain the volatile ices whereas the dominant population of small trans-Neptunian objects lost them. Quaoar, with only small amounts of methane, appears to be in an intermediary category.

In 2022, low-resolution near-infrared (0.7–5 μm) spectroscopic observations by the James Webb Space Telescope (JWST) revealed the presence of carbon dioxide ice, complex organics, and significant amounts of ethane ice on Quaoar's surface. Other possible chemical compounds include hydrogen cyanide and carbon monoxide. JWST also took medium-resolution near-infrared spectra of Quaoar and found evidence of small amounts of methane on Quaoar's surface. However, both JWST's low- and medium-resolution spectra of Quaoar did not show conclusive signs of ammonia hydrates.

High-resolution imaging by the Hubble Space Telescope has shown that Quaoar's equator is relatively brighter than its poles. One possible hypothesis proposed by Benjamin Proudfoot and colleagues suggests that infalling ring material may brighten Quaoar's equator. Another hypothesis proposed by the same researchers suggests that Quaoar's poles are darkened due to radiation processing of ethane that has condensed there, in a similar fashion to Pluto's moon Charon.

=== Possible atmosphere ===
The presence of methane and other volatiles on Quaoar's surface suggest that it may support a tenuous atmosphere produced from the sublimation of volatiles. With a measured mean temperature of approximately 44 K (−229.2 °C), the upper limit of Quaoar's atmospheric pressure is expected to be in the range of a few microbars. Due to Quaoar's small size and mass, the possibility of Quaoar having an atmosphere of nitrogen and carbon monoxide has been ruled out, since the gases would escape from Quaoar. The possibility of a methane atmosphere, with the upper limit being less than 1 microbar, was considered until 2013, when Quaoar occulted a 15.8-magnitude star and revealed no sign of a substantial atmosphere, placing an upper limit to at least 20 nanobars, under the assumption that Quaoar's mean temperature is 42 K (−231.2 °C) and that its atmosphere consists of mostly methane. The upper limit of atmosphere pressure was tightened to 10 nanobars after another stellar occultation in 2019, and following that, the upper limit of a methane atmosphere was further tightened to 0.15 nanobars in 2026.

== Satellites ==
=== Weywot ===
Timelapse of Hubble images showing Weywot orbiting Quaoar from June to July 2025

Quaoar has one confirmed natural satellite, Weywot (formal designation (50000) Quaoar I). It was discovered by Michael E. Brown and Terry-Ann Suer on 14 February 2006 and was named after the sky god Weywot, the son of Quaoar in Tongva mythology. It orbits Quaoar at a distance of about 13,300 km (8,300 mi) with an orbital period of 12.4 days, placing it outside of both rings of Quaoar. It follows a nearly circular orbit that is slightly inclined by 5° with respect to Quaoar's equator. Observations of Weywot via stellar occultations have shown it to be a very dark object with a volume equivalent diameter of roughly 146 km (91 mi).

=== Possible second moon ===
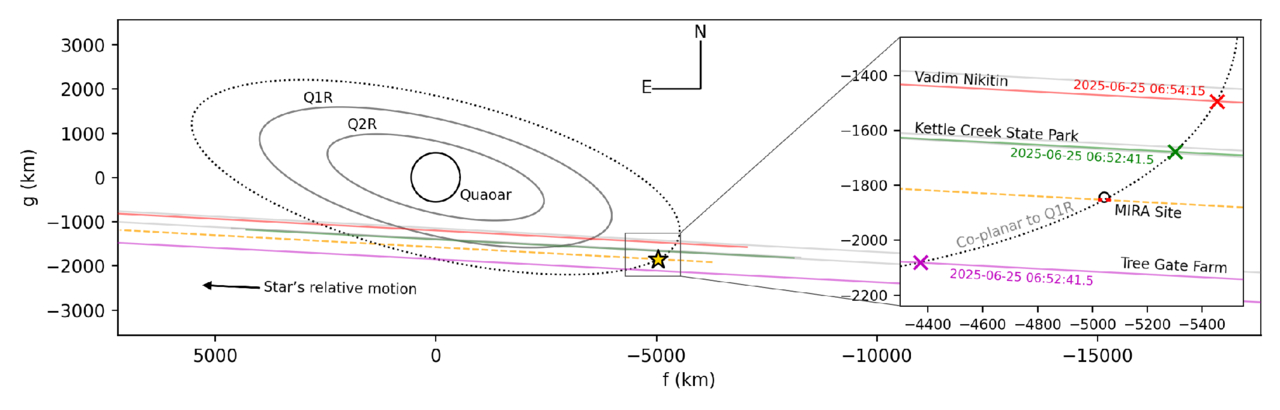
Diagram illustrating the location and occultation discovery of Quaoar's second moon on 25 June 2025. Colored lines (chords) represent the path of the occulted star as it moves behind the Quaoar system.

A potential second moon of Quaoar was reported in 2025, when astronomers Richard Nolthenius and Kirk Bender each separately observed, from different telescopes at the same observatory (MIRA's Oliver Observing Station), an unexpected 1.23-second-long occultation of a background star (UCAC4 376-136839) near Quaoar on 25 June 2025. This occultation did not match the times and locations predicted for Weywot and Quaoar's known rings, which suggests that it was either caused by a small, unknown moon or a dense ring arc around Quaoar. They argue that competing local causes for the occultation can be ruled out. Of the two possible options, an unknown moon is the most likely one.

The putative second moon of Quaoar is estimated to be at least 38 km (24 mi) in diameter and 100 times less massive than Weywot. This would mean that this moon would appear extremely faint at an apparent magnitude of 28—practically impossible to detect with any available telescope including the James Webb Space Telescope. Only observations with stellar occultations and upcoming extremely large telescopes will be able to detect the second moon of Quaoar.

It is estimated that Quaoar's second moon orbits approximately between 5,700 and 5,800 km (3,500 and 3,600 mi) away from the dwarf planet with an orbital period of 3.6+0.5
−0.3 days—inside the orbit of Weywot, but outside both rings of Quaoar. The estimated orbit of Quaoar's second moon suggests that it may be gravitationally influencing Quaoar's outermost ring via a 5:3 or 8:5 mean-motion orbital resonance. The orbit of Quaoar's second moon also appears to coincide with the 7:2 mean-motion orbital resonance with Weywot, although such a resonance would be very weak. The gravitational influences of Weywot's inclined orbit and Quaoar's elongated shape are expected to cause apsidal and nodal precession in the second moon's orbit, which would make it inclined by 0.5° to 4.5° with respect to Quaoar's equator. If the newly detected feature around Quaoar is actually a moon, it acquires a forced eccentricity of about 0.002.

A 2026 study led by Felipe Braga-Ribas speculated that the discovery of a second moon among Quaoar's rings implies the existence of even more small moons around the dwarf planet. Braga-Ribas and colleagues argued that it is statistically unlikely to serendipitously detect a small moon of Quaoar in an occultation, as the probability of doing so is 0.08%. Furthermore, the ring arcs of Saturn and Neptune are known to be surrounded by many small moons, and it is possible that Quaoar's ring arcs might share a similar environment.

== Rings ==
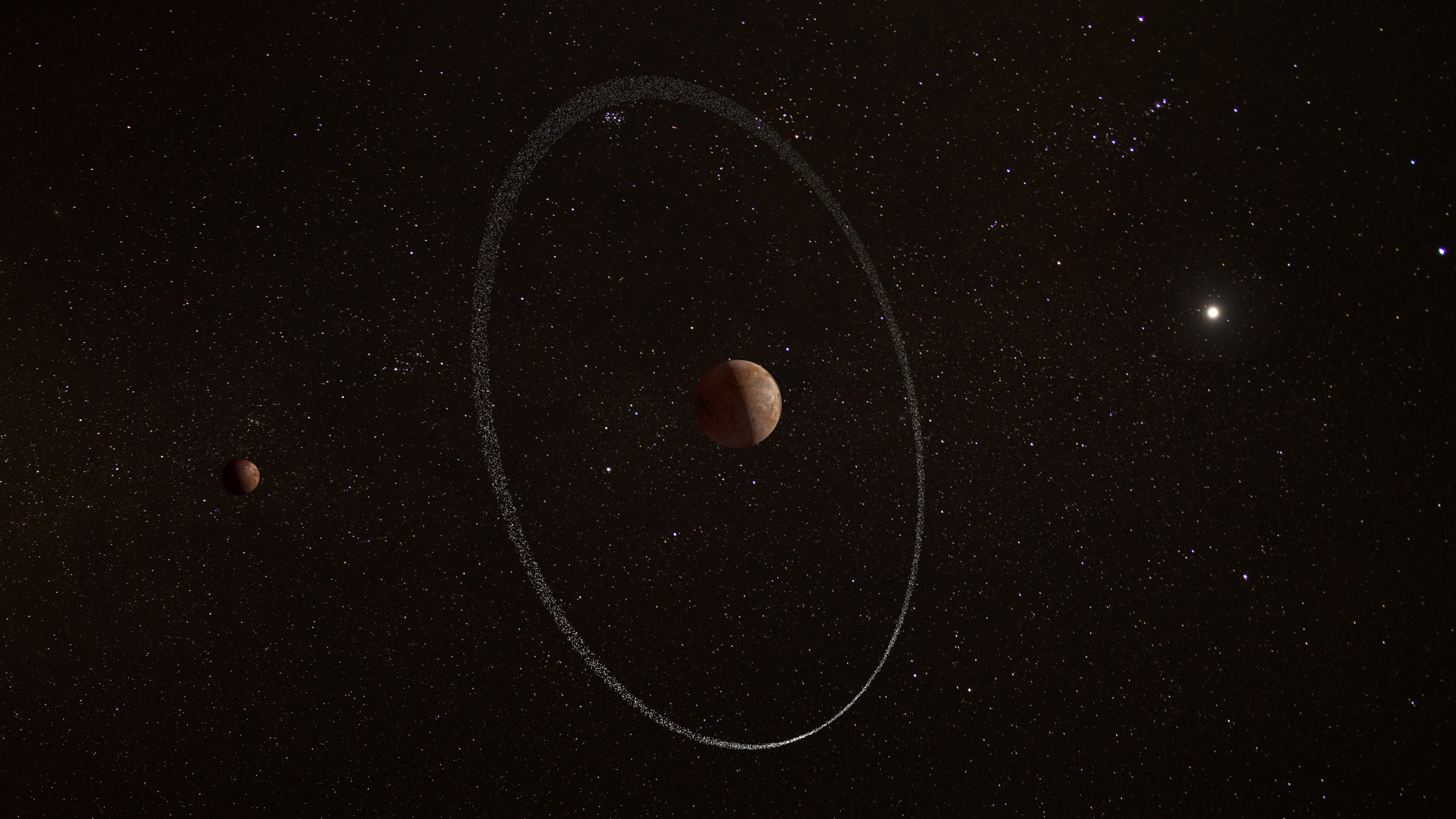
Artist's impression of Quaoar with its outer ring and its moon Weywot

=== Discovery ===
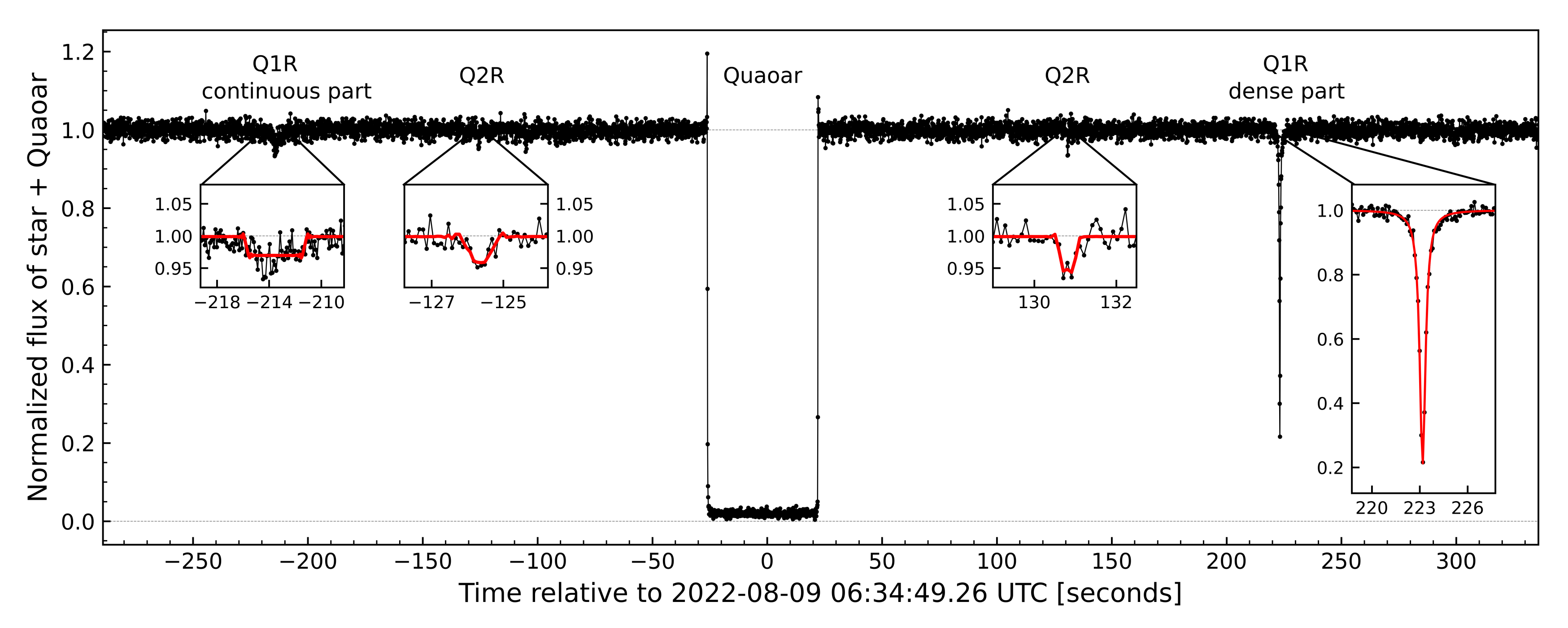
Light curve graph of a star's brightness as seen by the Gemini North Observatory during the 9 August 2022 occultation by Quaoar and its two rings. The asymmetry of the outer Q1R ring's opacity is apparent from its differing brightness dips before and after the occultation by Quaoar at the center.

Besides accurately determining sizes and shapes, stellar occultation campaigns were planned on a long-term basis to search for rings and/or atmospheres around small bodies of the outer Solar System. These campaigns agglomerated efforts of various teams in France, Spain and Brazil and were conducted under the umbrella of the European Research Council project Lucky Star. The discovery of Quaoar's first known ring, Q1R, involved various instruments used during stellar occultations observed between 2018 and 2021: the robotic ATOM telescope of the High Energy Stereoscopic System (HESS) in Namibia, the 10.4-m Gran Telescopio Canarias (La Palma Island, Spain); the ESA CHEOPS space telescope, and several stations run by citizen astronomers in Australia where a report of a Neptune-like ring originated and a dense arc in Q1R was first observed. Taken together, these observations reveal the presence of a partly dense, mostly tenuous and uniquely distant ring around Quaoar, a discovery announced in February 2023.

In April 2023, astronomers of the Lucky Star project published the discovery of another ring of Quaoar, Q2R. The Q2R ring was detected by the highly-sensitive 8.2-m Gemini North and the 4.0-m Canada–France–Hawaii Telescope in Mauna Kea, Hawaii, during an observing campaign to confirm Quaoar's Q1R ring in a stellar occultation on 9 August 2022. Quaoar is the fourth minor planet and eighth Solar System object known and confirmed to have a ring system, after (in order of discovery) Saturn, Uranus, Jupiter, Neptune, 2060 Chiron, 10199 Chariklo, and 136108 Haumea. (Note: 2060 Chiron's rings were initially observed in 2011, and were confirmed by 2022.)

=== Properties ===
Orbit diagrams of the Quaoar–Weywot system

Viewed from Earth

Viewed top-down over Quaoar's north pole

Quaoar possesses two narrow rings, provisionally named Q1R and Q2R by order of discovery, which are confined at radial distances where their orbital periods are integer ratios of Quaoar's rotational period. That is, the rings of Quaoar are in spin-orbit resonances.

Ring–moon system data
Rings
Ring designation	Radius (km)	Width (km)	Optical depth (τ)
Q2R	2520±20	10	≈0.004
Q1R	4057±6	5–300	0.004–0.7
Moons
Name	Semi-major axis (km)	Diameter (km)	Period (days)
(2025 candidate)	5676±108	≈ 29 (equatorial diameter)	3.6+0.5 −0.3
Weywot	13329±19	165	12.42727±0.00003

The outer ring, Q1R, orbits Quaoar at a distance of 4,057 ± 6 km (2,521 ± 4 mi), over seven times the radius of Quaoar and more than double the theoretical maximum distance of the Roche limit. The Q1R ring is not uniform and is strongly irregular around its circumference, being more opaque (and denser) where it is narrow and less opaque where it is broader. The Q1R ring's radial width ranges from 5 to 300 km (3 to 200 mi) while its optical depth ranges from 0.004 to 0.7. The irregular width of the Q1R ring resembles Saturn's frequently-perturbed F ring or Neptune's ring arcs, which may imply the presence of small, kilometer-sized moonlets embedded within the Q1R ring and gravitationally perturbing the material. The Q1R ring likely consists of icy particles; it is hypothesized that the extremely cold temperature of Quaoar's environment allows the ring particles to elastically collide with each other without accreting into a larger mass.

Q1R is located in between the 6:1 mean-motion orbital resonance with Quaoar's moon Weywot at 4,021 ± 57 km (2,499 ± 35 mi) and Quaoar's 1:3 spin-orbit resonance at 4,197 ± 58 km (2,608 ± 36 mi). The Q1R ring's coincidental location at these resonances implies they play a key role in maintaining the ring without having it accrete into a single moon. In particular, the confinement of rings to the 1:3 spin-orbit resonance may be common among ringed small Solar System bodies, as it has been previously seen in Chariklo and Haumea.

The inner ring, Q2R, orbits Quaoar at a distance of 2,520 ± 20 km (1,566 ± 12 mi), about four and a half times Quaoar's radius and also outside Quaoar's Roche limit. The Q2R ring's location coincides with Quaoar's 5:7 spin-orbit resonance at 2,525 ± 58 km (1,569 ± 36 mi). Compared to Q1R, the Q2R ring appears relatively uniform with a radial width of 10 km (6.2 mi). With an optical depth of 0.004, the Q2R ring is very tenuous and its opacity is comparable to the least dense part of the Q1R ring.

== Exploration ==
Quaoar from New Horizons viewed at a distance of 14 AU

It has been calculated that a flyby mission to Quaoar using a Jupiter gravity assist would take 13.6 years, for launch dates of 25 December 2026, 22 November 2027, 22 December 2028, 22 January 2030 and 20 December 2040. Quaoar would be 41 to 43 AU from the Sun when the spacecraft arrived. In July 2016, the Long Range Reconnaissance Imager (LORRI) aboard the New Horizons spacecraft took a sequence of four images of Quaoar from a distance of about 14 AU. Interstellar Probe, a concept by Pontus Brandt and his colleagues at Johns Hopkins Applied Physics Laboratory would potentially fly by Quaoar in the 2030s before continuing to the interstellar medium, and it has been proposed as a potential flyby target of the first of China National Space Administration's proposed Shensuo probes, which are designed to explore the heliosphere. Quaoar has been chosen as a flyby target for missions like these particularly for its escaping methane atmosphere and possible cryovolcanism, as well as its close proximity to the heliospheric nose.
