= Capture of Triton =

Hypotheses about Triton's origin

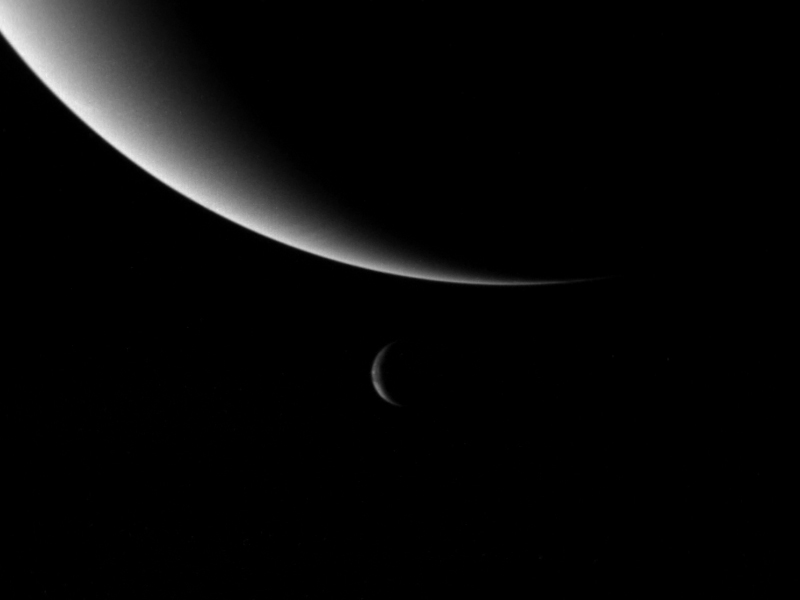
The crescents of Neptune and Triton, as imaged by the Voyager 2 spacecraft.

Triton, the largest moon of Neptune, is hypothesized to have been captured from heliocentric orbit early in the Solar System's history. Triton is unusual as it is the only known large moon with a retrograde, highly inclined orbit; that is, Triton orbits in the opposite direction Neptune rotates, and its orbit is not aligned with Neptune's equatorial plane. This conflicts with the conventional theory of moon formation, where large moons tend to form from discs of debris and thus orbit prograde. As a result, astronomers have proposed various hypotheses on how Triton acquired its unusual orbital configuration, with capture hypotheses currently being the tentative consensus.

The capture of Triton would have been a cataclysmic event, severely disrupting any moons then existing around Neptune and reducing them to rubble. Triton itself experienced extreme tidal heating, possibly to the point of melting entirely, and may have collided with other moons. Remaining debris then accreted into the small regular moons of Neptune that lie inside Triton's orbit.

== History ==
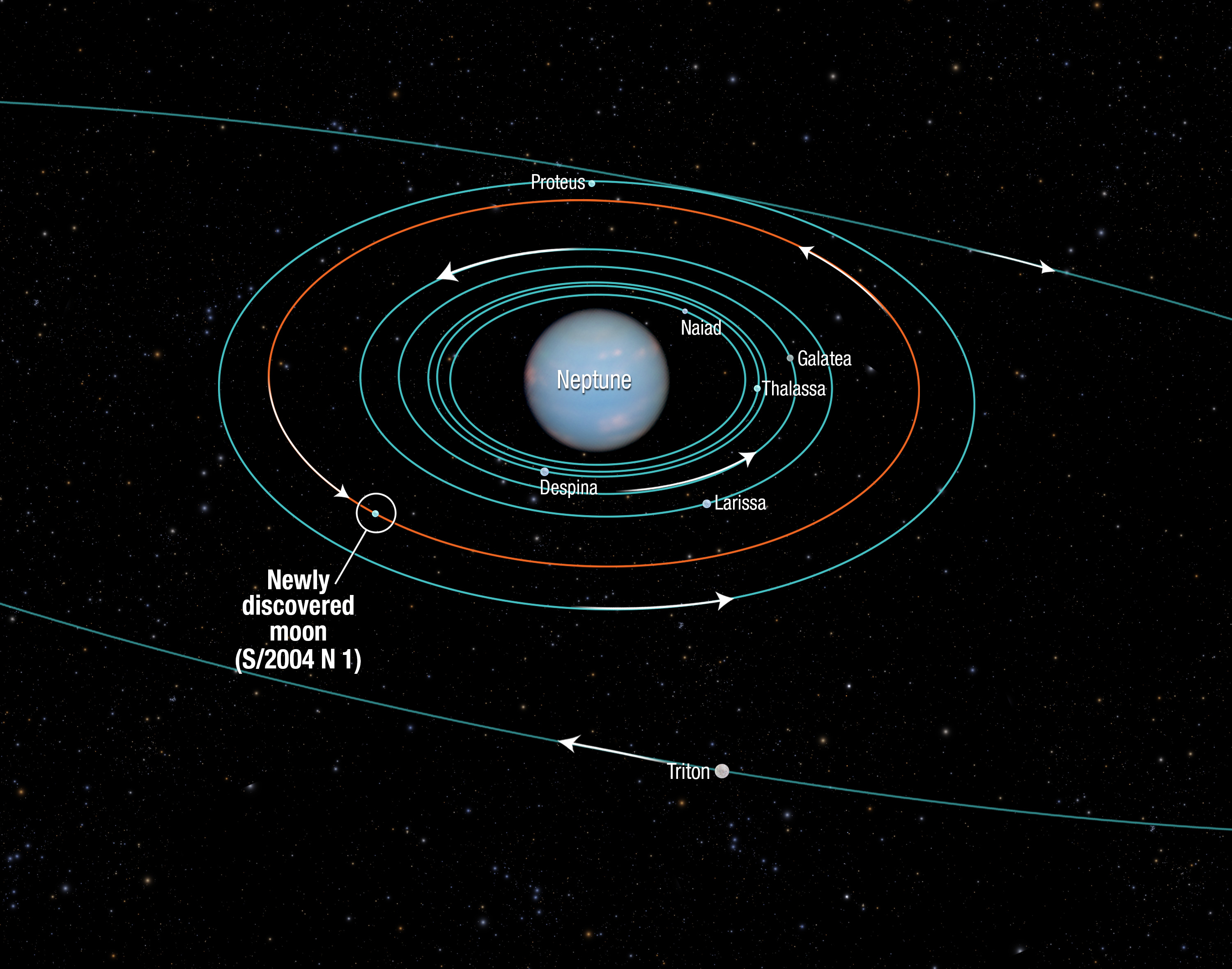
Orbit diagram of Neptune's inner moons including Triton, with their names and orbit directions indicated.

Early attempts to explain Triton's orbit include a hypothesis first proposed by British astronomer Raymond A. Lyttleton in 1936, who postulated that both Triton and Pluto were once large regular moons of Neptune. Mutual interactions between the two would then eject Pluto and flip Triton's orbit, explaining the former's then-apparent isolation and the latter's retrograde orbit. However, the original hypothesis was borne out of heavily overestimated masses for both Pluto and Triton; as estimates for their masses approached their true values, it was recognized that Pluto could not realistically reverse Triton's orbit. To address this, in 1979 a team of astronomers led by Paolo Farinella proposed a "hybrid" model, where only Pluto was an indigenous satellite of Neptune and Triton is a captured object. Alternatively, astronomers Robert S. Harrington and Tom Van Flandern proposed that same year that an encounter with a rogue object several times more massive than Earth could provide the gravitational influence and energy necessary to eject Pluto and reverse Triton's orbit whilst disrupting the rest of the Neptune system. This "encounter" model was contested by Farinella and collaborators in 1980, who noted that it failed to explain why Neptune's orbit was not disrupted despite encountering such a massive object. Thus, into the 1980s capture models began to grow more accepted, and by 1989 several researchers had explored Triton's orbital and thermal history under a capture scenario.

Models invoking catastrophic interactions between Pluto and Triton were refuted by William B. McKinnon in 1984, demonstrating that such a scenario was impossible given the energies required, regardless of configuration. Instead, McKinnon proposed that both worlds are leftover icy planetesimals from the early Solar System, with Triton being later captured into Neptune's orbit. Following the Voyager 2 spacecraft's flyby of the Neptune system, Triton's physical properties—including its diameter and mass—were measured with precision for the first time, thereby allowing researchers to investigate and model Triton's putative capture in greater detail. Early post-flyby research includes modelling by William B. McKinnon and Lance A. M. Benner in 1990, who sought to relate Triton's expected thermal evolution following its capture to the geological characteristics observed by Voyager 2.

== Initial capture ==
=== Capture mechanisms ===
Gas drag within a massive circumplanetary nebula surrounding Neptune was studied and modelled by William B. McKinnon and Andrew C. Leith in 1995. In this scenario, Triton directly interacts with surrounding gas and dust around Neptune, inducing drag that bleeds energy from Triton's orbit. A close encounter with Neptune, where Triton's relative velocity is larger due to gravitational acceleration, is capable of directly capturing Triton from Solar orbit in a single pass. However, as gas drag would continue to influence Triton's orbit, the moon would be at risk of spiralling into Neptune unless the post-capture influence of drag is mitigated. Earlier investigations into gas drag capture invoke a rapid collapse of the gas envelope, stranding Triton and preventing further migration. McKinnon and Leith evaluated this scenario as unlikely unless Neptune's accretion terminated very rapidly. Instead, McKinnon and Leith argue that Triton's large mass contributes to its survival and that post-capture Triton may be capable of clearing out a gap, terminating its gas drag evolution.

Three-body capture, more recently proposed by Craig B. Agnor and Douglas P. Hamilton in 2006, involves Triton in a binary system with a third object, similar to Pluto and its large moon Charon. In this hypothesis, as the binary system approaches Neptune, it becomes unbound by tidal forces; one component of the binary is ejected from the system, and Triton is captured into a highly eccentric orbit around Neptune. For this to occur, the escaping companion must be massive enough to provide the impulse needed for a single pass capture, though the companion can still be less massive than Triton. The event would have been "gentle and brief", as Triton is not subject to violent disruption or potentially dangerous post-capture orbital decay. Additionally, the prevalence of binaries among Kuiper belt objects, combined with the outward migration of Neptune early in the Solar System's history, ensures that an encounter between Neptune and a binary system is not particularly unlikely.

=== Nereid ===
The configuration of Nereid has been difficult to reconcile with capture models. If Triton was indeed captured during the era of giant planet migrations, it would be reasonable to assume that Nereid was also captured in this period. As a result, Triton's high eccentricity phase would have greatly perturbed any other irregular moons present at the time of its capture, including Nereid. Modelling by Erica Nogueira and collaborators demonstrated that if Triton's initial semi-major axis was between 100 and 400 Neptune radii (R_{N}, 24,622±19 km), Nereid almost always collided with Neptune within 0.1 Myr (0.1 million years). To reconcile this, Nogueira and collaborators considered five possible scenarios to explain the existence and current configuration of Nereid:

- Triton could have been captured into a much smaller orbit, with a semi-major axis smaller than 50 R_{N}. This allows for Triton to circularize much more rapidly, increasing the chances of Nereid's survival. However, capture into a small semi-major axis is unlikely.
- Nereid may not be a captured satellite after all and could represent a surviving member of Neptune's primordial moon system. Modelling by Nogueira and collaborators failed to successfully scatter Nereid from a prograde orbit, with all cases either ending up with Nereid colliding with Neptune or being ejected. As a result, they deem this scenario unlikely.
- Desch and Porter proposed a modification of the three-body capture model in 2010, where the companion is far more massive—double the mass of the Earth. Desch and Porter did not report the typical semi-major axis of Triton after this mechanism of capture, so it is unclear if the model proposed by them is compatible with Nereid's existence.
- Interactions between Triton and a massive disc of debris produced by the disrupted primordial moons may be capable of damping Triton's eccentricity rapidly. However, if Triton's semi-major axis is large enough, the risk of the primordial satellites ejecting Triton rises, and it is not clear if the primordial satellites would be ground into debris fast enough to reduce the risk of a destructive collision with Triton.
- If Triton was captured before the planetary instability, its orbit would have circularized long before the capture of Nereid and the other irregular moons, since it is unlikely that they would have been present. Nogueira and collaborators evaluate this scenario as the most plausible.

== Subsequent effects ==
=== Tidal heating ===
Following capture, Triton's orbit would have been highly eccentric, circularizing post-capture to its present, nearly circular orbit. In this early eccentric state, tides raised on Triton by Neptune would have been extreme, dissipating large amounts of energy within Triton and contributing to the circularization of its orbit. The amount of energy dissipated was likely enough to contribute to Triton's differentiation into a rocky core and icy mantle, potentially to the point of melting the satellite entirely. Early in this phase, Triton was dominated by strong turbulent cooling, with heat transferred by strong convection in its liquid water ocean. As the magnitude of tidal heating decreases during the circularization process, an ice shell grows atop the liquid water ocean, slowing the rate of cooling; tidal heating would preferentially heat the base of the ice shell. In combination with radiogenic heating within Triton's rocky core, tidal heating induced after its capture and subsequent circularization may have been enough to sustain a subsurface liquid water ocean to the present day.

=== Disruption of primordial moons ===
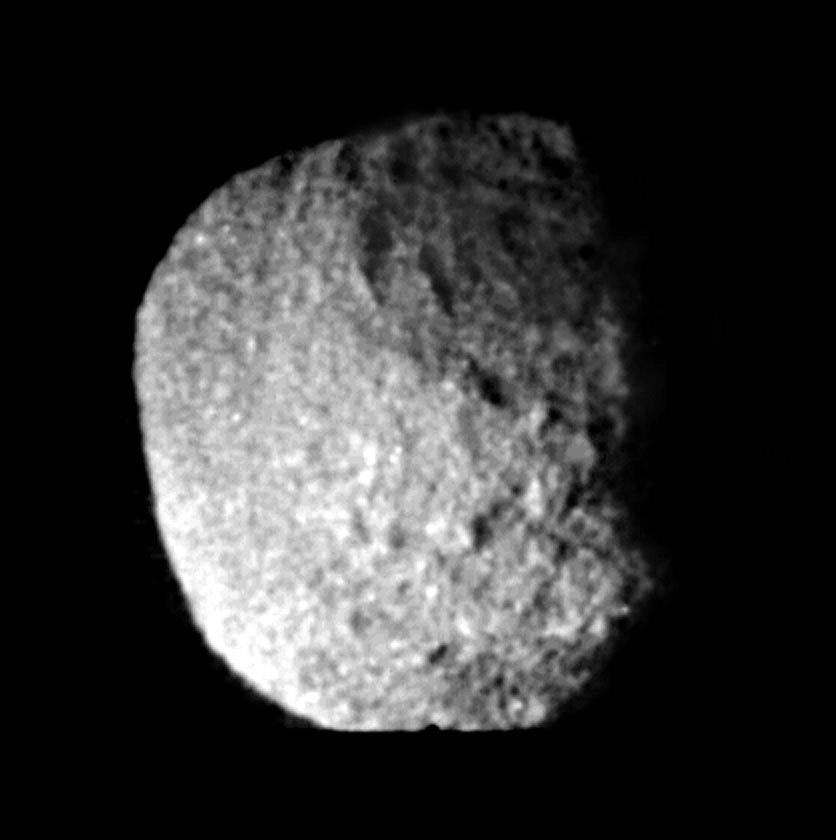
Proteus, like Neptune's other inner moons, likely accreted from the rubble produced following Triton's capture.

There are seven known regular moons interior to Triton's orbit, all of which have nearly circular prograde orbits and are strongly perturbed by Triton. It is unlikely that these moons represent Neptune's original regular moon system, as Triton's capture would have been severely destructive to any pre-existing moons around Neptune. Following Triton's capture into a highly eccentric orbit, perturbations would begin to raise the eccentricity of the primordial moons, potentially up to an eccentricity of 0.3 before tidal damping from Neptune becomes more effective at reducing the satellites' eccentricities than Triton is at raising them. At this eccentricity, two satellites between the Roche limit for ice (~2.7 R_{N}) and 5 R_{N} would be able to collide with each other, with a calculated collision time scale of 1 kyr (1,000 years). As the time scale for which the orbits overlap before their eccentricities are damped is 100 kyr, collisions would almost certainly occur within this time scale. Following the collisions, debris would have rapidly damped out the orbits of any remaining fragments or moons. After Triton's orbit circularized, a new "daughter" system of moons reaccreted out of the remaining rubble.

=== Eventual destruction ===
Diagram of the forces in tidal acceleration (1) and tidal deceleration (2). The tidal dynamics of Triton are similar to (2).

Triton raises tides on Neptune. Due to Triton's retrograde orbit, this process slowly removes angular momentum from its orbit, causing it to shrink in a process called tidal deceleration. How quickly its orbit decays depends on how much energy is dissipated in Neptune's interior, measured by its tidal dissipation factor (Q_{N}). Early estimates of Q_{N} were too low, leading to predictions that Triton would reach the Roche limit and be torn apart into a planetary ring within 100 Myr. Later modelling showed that its decay is gentler. Christopher F. Chyba concluded in 1989 that Triton would take ~3.6 Gyr to reach the Roche limit. Further refinements to the value of Q_{N} led to a 2025 study showing an even slower orbital evolution, with Triton surviving for 28 Gyr.

== Alternatives to capture ==
Though the current astronomical consensus for Triton's origin is capture, difficulties in reconciling the capture models with Nereid's survival have led to some astronomers investigating the viability of an in-situ origin of Triton.

Scenarios involving a close encounter between Neptune and a perturbing planet, similar to the model by Harrington and van Flandern, have been proposed. In 2020, astronomers Di Li and Apostolos A. Christou argued that the original criticisms of the encounter model by Paolo Farinella and collaborators—that no candidate perturbing object has been observed and that Neptune's orbit is not excited—can be explained by the five-planet Nice model. The five-planet Nice model proposes an additional ice giant planet in addition to Uranus and Neptune early in the Solar System that is subsequently ejected. It provides a planet for which close encounters with the other four giant planets may have occurred. Even if Neptune's orbit is excited by the encounter with the "fifth giant", interactions with a massive primordial Kuiper belt would have damped Neptune's orbit to its present state. Numerical modelling of encounters between Neptune and the fifth giant and the evolution of surviving moons successfully reproduces a Triton-like moon and a Nereid-like moon, though the authors note that the encounter model is less efficient than the capture models.

A second alternative model invokes giant collisions between Neptune and multiple planetary embryos during its formation. Proposed by astronomers Rodney Gomes and Alessandro Morbidelli in 2024, the authors investigated two collisions with Earth-sized protoplanetary impactors. Using numerical simulations, the authors found that the likelihood of Triton achieving a retrograde orbit depends heavily on the axial tilt of Neptune after the first collision. Following the first collision, Triton's orbit would begin to precess relative to Neptune's new equatorial plane, with the second collision bringing Neptune close to or at its present axial tilt and leaving Triton's orbit oriented retrograde. This model is not restricted to two major collisions, with the authors noting that additional collisions could help increase the likelihood of Triton achieving an orbit similar to its present-day configuration.

== See also ==
- Origin of the Moon
- Scattered disc
- Tidally detached exomoon
