= Weywot =

Moon of dwarf planet Quaoar

- Quaoar and Weywot (left of Quaoar) imaged by the Hubble Space Telescope in June 2025

Discovery
- Discovered by: Michael E. Brown; Terry-Ann Suer
- Discovery date: 14 February 2006

Designations
- Designation: (50000) Quaoar I
- Pronunciation: /ˈweɪwɒt/

Orbital characteristics (Note: Orbital elements from the Constrained Fit column of Table 2 in Proudfoot et al. (2025). The Constrained Fit parameters are preferred by the authors.)
- Epoch 21 September 2006 (JD 2454000)
- Semi-major axis: 13329±19 km
- Eccentricity: 0.01111+0.0044 −0.0040
- Orbital period (sidereal): 12.42727±0.00003 d
- Mean anomaly: 79°+39° −27°
- Inclination: 13.62°+0.32° −0.33° (to ecliptic); 6.13°+1.35° −1.06° (to Quaoar)
- Longitude of ascending node: 353.3°+0.83° −0.85°
- Argument of periapsis: 97°+28° −37°
- Satellite of: 50000 Quaoar

Physical characteristics
- Dimensions: 164+10 −6 × 146+10 −6 × 130+16 −24 km
- Mean diameter: 146±10 km (Note: Volume-equivalent diameter, calculated via the volume of an ellipsoid with the dimensions given in Collyer et al. (2026).)
- Mass: (1.485±0.360)×10^{18} kg
- Mean density: 0.95±0.60 g/cm^{3}
- Synodic rotation period: synchronous
- Albedo: 0.036+0.010 −0.006
- Spectral type: H_{2}O type; H_{F606W}–H_{F350LP} = 0.015±0.029
- Apparent magnitude: 24.45 to 24.55 (Note: Apparent magnitude values of Weywot are shown in Table 1 of Collyer et al. (2026). The Hubble F606W filter is the closest representation of the visible spectrum (Johnson V filter), so magnitude values with this filter are shown here.)
- Absolute magnitude (H): 8.484±0.042 (Note: H = 8.484±0.042 is the rotationally-averaged absolute magnitude of Weywot in the Johnson V (visible-light) filter. If not averaged, Weywot's absolute (and apparent) magnitude would appear to vary by a peak-to-trough amplitude of ∆m = 0.119±0.036 magnitudes as it rotates.)

Weywot (formal designation (50000) Quaoar I) is the only confirmed moon of the trans-Neptunian dwarf planet Quaoar. It was discovered by Michael Brown and Terry-Ann Suer using images taken by the Hubble Space Telescope on 14 February 2006. It is named after the Tongva sky god and son of Quaoar.

Weywot is an elongated body with an average diameter of 146 km (91 mi). It has an extremely dark, water ice-rich surface with an albedo of about 0.04, making it one of the darkest known moons beyond Neptune. Weywot follows a nearly circular orbit around Quaoar, revolving every 12.4 days at an average distance of 13,300 km (8,300 mi). It is thought to play a role in maintaining Quaoar's outer ring by gravitationally influencing it in an orbital resonance.

== Observational history ==
=== Discovery ===
Weywot was first imaged by the Hubble Space Telescope on 14 February 2006, during Michael Brown's survey for satellites around large trans-Neptunian objects (TNOs) using Hubble's high-resolution Advanced Camera for Surveys. Consecutive images from that date showed that Weywot appeared stationary relative to Quaoar and was visibly separated at an angular distance of 0.35 arcseconds. After Brown's Hubble survey concluded in late 2006, he and his colleague Terry-Ann Suer reported their newly discovered TNO satellites to the Central Bureau for Astronomical Telegrams, which published their discovery of Weywot alongside the three TNO satellites Vanth, Tinia, and the nameless moon of 208996 Achlys on 22 February 2007.

To determine Weywot's orbit, Brown reobserved it with Hubble in March 2007 and March 2008. Together with his colleague Wesley Fraser, Brown published the first preliminary orbit of Weywot in May 2010. Fraser and Brown were unable to precover Weywot in earlier ultraviolet Hubble images from 2002, either because the satellite was obscured by Quaoar or it was too faint in ultraviolet light.

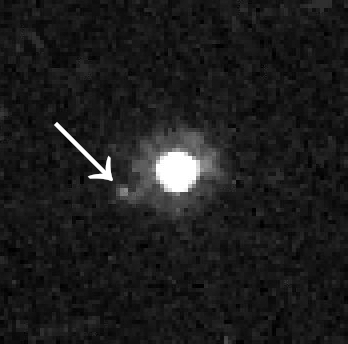
Hubble Space Telescope discovery photo of Weywot from 14 February 2006

Timelapse of Hubble images showing Weywot orbiting Quaoar from June to July 2025

=== Occultations and further imaging ===
The shape of Weywot as revealed by chords (blue lines) from its 22 June 2023 stellar occultation

Up until 2019, Weywot's orbit was not definitively known. Limited imaging data from that time seemed to suggest that Weywot had a highly eccentric orbit that could either be prograde or retrograde. This was resolved after 4 August 2019, when astronomers at Namibia fortuitously observed Weywot occult a star for the first time. This observation revealed that Weywot was larger and darker than expected and pinpointed its location accurately enough to unambiguously determine that it had a prograde, 12.4-day circular orbit.

As of 2026, four stellar occultations by Weywot have been successfully observed. The 22 June 2023 event in particular was the first stellar occultation by Weywot observed from multiple different locations, allowing for an accurate determination of its shape and albedo. These observations were aided by Hubble imaging of Weywot from 2023 to 2025, which led to improved occultation predictions, further constraints on Weywot's elongated shape, and confirmation of its tidally locked rotation.

== Name ==
Weywot was not assigned a provisional designation when its discovery was announced. Brown left the choice of a name up to the Tongva, whose creator-god Quaoar had been named after. The Tongva chose the sky god Weywot, son of Quaoar. The name of Weywot was officially announced by the Minor Planet Center in a notice published on 4 October 2009.

== Physical characteristics ==
=== Size, shape, and rotation ===
Weywot is the largest moon of Quaoar, having a mean diameter of 146 ± 10 km (90.7 ± 6.2 mi). It has an elongated and flattened shape, approximately a triaxial ellipsoid with dimensions of 164 km × 146 km × 130 km (102 mi × 91 mi × 81 mi). This shape does not match that expected for a tidally-distorted body in hydrostatic equilibrium, meaning Weywot must have a somewhat rigid, possibly rubble pile interior structure.

Due to its elongated shape, Weywot's apparent brightness fluctuates with a peak-to-trough amplitude of 0.119±0.036 magnitudes as it rotates in Earth's point of view. Weywot's brightness varies with the same period as its orbit around Quaoar, which indicates that the moon is tidally locked to the dwarf planet. This agrees with theoretical predictions that Weywot should become tidally locked to Quaoar within 150 million years after its formation.

Weywot appears extremely faint from Earth, having an apparent magnitude of about 24.5 in visible light. This makes it approximately 5.6 magnitudes or 170 times fainter than Quaoar in visible light. (Note: The Quaoar–Weywot visible magnitude difference (18.9 – 24.5 = 5.6) is calculated from the F606W magnitude values given in Table 1 of Collyer et al. (2026). The 2006 discovery announcement of Weywot has given the same number for the Quaoar–Weywot visible magnitude difference. For converting the magnitude difference into flux ratio, apply $\frac{F_Q}{F_W} {{=}} 10^{-0.4(m_Q - m_W)} \approx 174$ (see Apparent magnitude#Calculations).) For this reason, Weywot can only be imaged with a large, high-resolution telescope such as Hubble.

=== Mass and composition ===
Stellar occultations and Hubble imaging have shown that Quaoar slightly wobbles due to Weywot's gravitational influence. This allows for a measurement of Weywot's mass, which turns out to be (1.485±0.360)×10^{18} kg, or 0.12%±0.03% of Quaoar's mass. Weywot has a low bulk density of 0.95±0.60 g/cm^{3}. Low densities of around 0.7 g/cm^{3} are expected for small, icy bodies.

=== Surface ===
Weywot has one of the darkest known surfaces among moons of TNOs, with a low geometric albedo of 0.036+0.010
−0.006. It is approximately 3.6 times less reflective than Quaoar, whose albedo is 0.124. Some moons of other large TNOs, including Eris's moon Dysnomia and Orcus's moon Vanth, share similar low-albedo surfaces that are much darker than their parents. These dark moons of TNOs are thought to share similar formation histories with relatively lower water-ice mass fractions.

Preliminary spectroscopic observations by the James Webb Space Telescope have shown that Weywot's surface is rich in water ice, making it a H_{2}O type TNO. H_{2}O type TNOs are known to have low albedos like Weywot, and are thought to have "mature" or space-weathered surfaces.

== Orbit ==
Orbit diagrams of the Quaoar–Weywot system

Viewed from Earth

Viewed top-down over Quaoar's north pole

Weywot orbits Quaoar at an average distance of 13,300 km (8,300 mi) and takes 12.4 days to complete one revolution. Its orbit is slightly inclined relative to Quaoar's rings (and presumably Quaoar's equator) at an angle of approximately 6°, and is nearly circular with an eccentricity of approximately 0.01. The moon's orbit also exhibits apsidal precession at a rate of 0.48+0.24
−0.21 deg/yr and nodal precession at a rate of −0.49+0.21
−0.24 deg/yr.

=== Influence on the Quaoar system ===
Quaoar has two known rings that lie very close to Weywot's mean-motion orbital resonances (MMRs), where their orbital periods are fractions of Weywot's. These rings, named Q2R and Q1R, orbit Quaoar at distances of approximately 2,530 and 4,100 km (1,570 and 2,550 mi), respectively. The inner edge of Q1R is bounded by Weywot's 6:1 MMR (Note: An object in the 6:1 MMR with Weywot orbits Quaoar 6 times for every 1 orbit completed by Weywot.) at 4,035 km (2,507 mi), while the outer edge of Q2R is bounded by Weywot's much weaker 12:1 MMR (Note: An object in the 12:1 MMR with Weywot orbits Quaoar 12 times for every 1 orbit completed by Weywot.) at 2,543 km (1,580 mi). Both rings also are bounded by spin-orbit resonances with Quaoar, (Note: In a spin-orbit resonance with Quaoar, the orbital period of a satellite is a fraction of Quaoar's rotation period.) and those together with Weywot's MMRs are believed to play a role in keeping the rings narrow. Weywot's slightly inclined orbit may also cause vertical warping or bending waves in Quaoar's rings, which could potentially prevent clumping of the rings.

Weywot may additionally be in a 2:7 MMR with a possible inner moon of Quaoar, which was discovered in June 2025. Weywot's influence is predicted to slightly raise this putative moon's orbital eccentricity and inclination.

Despite being the largest moon of the Quaoar system, Weywot's tides are too weak to have slowed Quaoar's rotation down to its present-day period. It remains unclear why Quaoar has a slow rotation period.
