= List of minor planets: 674001–675000 =

The following is a partial list of minor planets, running from minor-planet number 674001 through 675000, inclusive. The primary data for this and other partial lists is based on JPL's "Small-Body Orbital Elements" and data available from the Minor Planet Center. Critical list information is also provided by the MPC, unless otherwise specified from Lowell Observatory. A detailed description of the table's columns and additional sources are given on the main page including a complete list of every page in this series, and a statistical break-up on the dynamical classification of minor planets.

Also see the summary list of all named bodies in numerical and alphabetical order, and the corresponding naming citations for the number range of this particular list. New namings may only be added to this list after official publication, as the preannouncement of names is condemned by the Working Group for Small Bodies Nomenclature of the International Astronomical Union.

| Near-Earth obj. | MBA (inner) | MBA (outer) | Centaur |
| Mars-crosser | MBA (middle) | Jupiter trojan | Trans-Neptunian obj. |
| Unclassified |

== 674001–674100 ==
| Designation | | | Discovery | | | Properties | | Ref |
| Permanent | Provisional | Named after | Date | Site | Discoverer(s) | Category | Diam. | Ref |
|---|---|---|---|---|---|---|---|---|
| 674001 | 2015 HJ_{171} | — | July 28, 2011 | Haleakala | Pan-STARRS 1 | · | 1.4 km | MPC · JPL |
| 674002 | 2015 HY_{173} | — | March 26, 2003 | Palomar | NEAT | · | 1.6 km | MPC · JPL |
| 674003 | 2015 HX_{174} | — | December 13, 2010 | Mount Lemmon | Mount Lemmon Survey | · | 730 m | MPC · JPL |
| 674004 | 2015 HZ_{174} | — | January 23, 2015 | Haleakala | Pan-STARRS 1 | · | 1.6 km | MPC · JPL |
| 674005 | 2015 HY_{179} | — | September 14, 2013 | Haleakala | Pan-STARRS 1 | H | 430 m | MPC · JPL |
| 674006 | 2015 HU_{181} | — | September 18, 2003 | Palomar | NEAT | · | 1.5 km | MPC · JPL |
| 674007 | 2015 HX_{187} | — | April 25, 2015 | Haleakala | Pan-STARRS 1 | · | 2.8 km | MPC · JPL |
| 674008 | 2015 HE_{190} | — | March 19, 2015 | Haleakala | Pan-STARRS 1 | · | 1.1 km | MPC · JPL |
| 674009 | 2015 HN_{203} | — | April 23, 2015 | Haleakala | Pan-STARRS 1 | · | 1.1 km | MPC · JPL |
| 674010 | 2015 HH_{209} | — | April 30, 2015 | Cerro Paranal | Altmann, M., Prusti, T. | · | 490 m | MPC · JPL |
| 674011 | 2015 HB_{210} | — | April 25, 2015 | Haleakala | Pan-STARRS 1 | EUN | 1.1 km | MPC · JPL |
| 674012 | 2015 HM_{211} | — | April 25, 2015 | Haleakala | Pan-STARRS 1 | · | 1.7 km | MPC · JPL |
| 674013 | 2015 HY_{211} | — | April 25, 2015 | Haleakala | Pan-STARRS 1 | EOS | 1.3 km | MPC · JPL |
| 674014 | 2015 HY_{216} | — | April 24, 2015 | Haleakala | Pan-STARRS 1 | L4 | 8.1 km | MPC · JPL |
| 674015 | 2015 HD_{225} | — | April 18, 2015 | Haleakala | Pan-STARRS 1 | H | 340 m | MPC · JPL |
| 674016 | 2015 HD_{233} | — | April 18, 2015 | Cerro Tololo | DECam | · | 1.3 km | MPC · JPL |
| 674017 | 2015 HL_{241} | — | April 10, 2015 | Mount Lemmon | Mount Lemmon Survey | L4 | 6.0 km | MPC · JPL |
| 674018 | 2015 HB_{245} | — | April 18, 2015 | Cerro Tololo | DECam | KOR | 830 m | MPC · JPL |
| 674019 | 2015 HD_{285} | — | April 18, 2015 | Cerro Tololo-DECam | DECam | · | 2.0 km | MPC · JPL |
| 674020 | 2015 HF_{288} | — | April 18, 2015 | Cerro Tololo-DECam | DECam | · | 1.6 km | MPC · JPL |
| 674021 | 2015 HT_{298} | — | March 10, 2005 | Kitt Peak | Deep Ecliptic Survey | · | 1.3 km | MPC · JPL |
| 674022 | 2015 JM_{1} | — | May 13, 2015 | Haleakala | Pan-STARRS 1 | H | 590 m | MPC · JPL |
| 674023 | 2015 JU_{1} | — | May 13, 2015 | Haleakala | Pan-STARRS 1 | · | 530 m | MPC · JPL |
| 674024 | 2015 JP_{7} | — | May 15, 2015 | Haleakala | Pan-STARRS 1 | L4 | 6.7 km | MPC · JPL |
| 674025 | 2015 JW_{10} | — | September 16, 2009 | Kitt Peak | Spacewatch | · | 550 m | MPC · JPL |
| 674026 | 2015 JL_{14} | — | January 5, 2013 | Calar Alto-CASADO | Mottola, S. | · | 2.6 km | MPC · JPL |
| 674027 | 2015 JQ_{18} | — | May 12, 2015 | Mount Lemmon | Mount Lemmon Survey | · | 730 m | MPC · JPL |
| 674028 | 2015 JT_{19} | — | May 13, 2015 | Mount Lemmon | Mount Lemmon Survey | L4 | 7.2 km | MPC · JPL |
| 674029 | 2015 JY_{22} | — | May 13, 2015 | Mount Lemmon | Mount Lemmon Survey | · | 590 m | MPC · JPL |
| 674030 | 2015 JO_{25} | — | May 11, 2015 | Mount Lemmon | Mount Lemmon Survey | KOR | 1.2 km | MPC · JPL |
| 674031 | 2015 KV | — | February 27, 2015 | Haleakala | Pan-STARRS 1 | · | 1.7 km | MPC · JPL |
| 674032 | 2015 KQ_{2} | — | January 26, 2015 | Haleakala | Pan-STARRS 1 | · | 1.9 km | MPC · JPL |
| 674033 | 2015 KX_{2} | — | October 27, 2009 | Mount Lemmon | Mount Lemmon Survey | · | 1.4 km | MPC · JPL |
| 674034 | 2015 KC_{3} | — | February 25, 2015 | Haleakala | Pan-STARRS 1 | · | 1.7 km | MPC · JPL |
| 674035 | 2015 KJ_{3} | — | September 30, 2011 | Kitt Peak | Spacewatch | · | 1.7 km | MPC · JPL |
| 674036 | 2015 KP_{3} | — | June 12, 1997 | Kitt Peak | Spacewatch | · | 2.0 km | MPC · JPL |
| 674037 | 2015 KU_{4} | — | March 6, 2011 | Mount Lemmon | Mount Lemmon Survey | · | 1.3 km | MPC · JPL |
| 674038 | 2015 KV_{4} | — | August 13, 2012 | Haleakala | Pan-STARRS 1 | · | 1.4 km | MPC · JPL |
| 674039 | 2015 KV_{13} | — | May 18, 2015 | Haleakala | Pan-STARRS 1 | BRA | 1.3 km | MPC · JPL |
| 674040 | 2015 KN_{14} | — | March 28, 2015 | Haleakala | Pan-STARRS 1 | · | 2.2 km | MPC · JPL |
| 674041 | 2015 KW_{16} | — | May 18, 2015 | Haleakala | Pan-STARRS 1 | · | 1.5 km | MPC · JPL |
| 674042 | 2015 KV_{26} | — | September 16, 2003 | Palomar | NEAT | · | 1.6 km | MPC · JPL |
| 674043 | 2015 KY_{26} | — | September 21, 2003 | Kitt Peak | Spacewatch | WIT | 1.1 km | MPC · JPL |
| 674044 | 2015 KT_{35} | — | November 12, 2012 | Haleakala | Pan-STARRS 1 | MAR | 740 m | MPC · JPL |
| 674045 | 2015 KG_{36} | — | April 23, 2006 | Anderson Mesa | LONEOS | · | 1.5 km | MPC · JPL |
| 674046 | 2015 KN_{36} | — | November 8, 2008 | Kitt Peak | Spacewatch | EUN | 1.2 km | MPC · JPL |
| 674047 | 2015 KW_{36} | — | April 26, 2010 | Mount Lemmon | Mount Lemmon Survey | DOR | 2.0 km | MPC · JPL |
| 674048 | 2015 KZ_{39} | — | November 3, 2004 | Kitt Peak | Spacewatch | · | 1.5 km | MPC · JPL |
| 674049 | 2015 KM_{40} | — | September 29, 2003 | Kitt Peak | Spacewatch | · | 1.6 km | MPC · JPL |
| 674050 | 2015 KC_{41} | — | May 20, 2015 | Haleakala | Pan-STARRS 1 | · | 1.3 km | MPC · JPL |
| 674051 | 2015 KU_{41} | — | May 20, 2015 | Haleakala | Pan-STARRS 1 | · | 1.5 km | MPC · JPL |
| 674052 | 2015 KJ_{42} | — | September 14, 2007 | Catalina | CSS | EUN | 1.3 km | MPC · JPL |
| 674053 | 2015 KT_{43} | — | October 20, 2012 | Piszkés-tető | K. Sárneczky, A. Király | · | 1.2 km | MPC · JPL |
| 674054 | 2015 KR_{47} | — | May 20, 2015 | Haleakala | Pan-STARRS 1 | · | 1.5 km | MPC · JPL |
| 674055 | 2015 KU_{47} | — | May 20, 2015 | Haleakala | Pan-STARRS 1 | · | 2.5 km | MPC · JPL |
| 674056 | 2015 KF_{49} | — | October 7, 2008 | Mount Lemmon | Mount Lemmon Survey | · | 1.1 km | MPC · JPL |
| 674057 | 2015 KP_{50} | — | August 20, 2011 | Haleakala | Pan-STARRS 1 | · | 2.1 km | MPC · JPL |
| 674058 | 2015 KU_{50} | — | February 10, 2014 | Mount Lemmon | Mount Lemmon Survey | · | 1.2 km | MPC · JPL |
| 674059 | 2015 KV_{50} | — | September 2, 2011 | Haleakala | Pan-STARRS 1 | · | 1.5 km | MPC · JPL |
| 674060 | 2015 KC_{53} | — | December 31, 2013 | Kitt Peak | Spacewatch | · | 1.1 km | MPC · JPL |
| 674061 | 2015 KC_{55} | — | May 24, 2006 | Kitt Peak | Spacewatch | MRX | 890 m | MPC · JPL |
| 674062 | 2015 KP_{55} | — | May 24, 2011 | Haleakala | Pan-STARRS 1 | · | 1.4 km | MPC · JPL |
| 674063 | 2015 KZ_{55} | — | February 16, 2005 | La Silla | A. Boattini | · | 2.6 km | MPC · JPL |
| 674064 | 2015 KC_{61} | — | April 19, 2015 | Mount Lemmon | Mount Lemmon Survey | GEF | 1.0 km | MPC · JPL |
| 674065 | 2015 KG_{61} | — | September 20, 2006 | Catalina | CSS | · | 1.8 km | MPC · JPL |
| 674066 | 2015 KD_{64} | — | January 2, 2014 | Mount Lemmon | Mount Lemmon Survey | BRA | 1.1 km | MPC · JPL |
| 674067 | 2015 KR_{64} | — | August 13, 2012 | Haleakala | Pan-STARRS 1 | · | 1.4 km | MPC · JPL |
| 674068 | 2015 KW_{64} | — | January 2, 2012 | Kitt Peak | Spacewatch | L4 | 6.5 km | MPC · JPL |
| 674069 | 2015 KG_{65} | — | December 27, 2013 | Kitt Peak | Spacewatch | · | 1.6 km | MPC · JPL |
| 674070 | 2015 KD_{66} | — | October 5, 2011 | Piszkéstető | K. Sárneczky | · | 1.5 km | MPC · JPL |
| 674071 | 2015 KC_{68} | — | March 28, 2015 | Haleakala | Pan-STARRS 1 | · | 1.9 km | MPC · JPL |
| 674072 | 2015 KT_{68} | — | May 21, 2015 | Haleakala | Pan-STARRS 1 | · | 1.6 km | MPC · JPL |
| 674073 | 2015 KX_{68} | — | January 15, 2010 | Mount Lemmon | Mount Lemmon Survey | · | 1.3 km | MPC · JPL |
| 674074 | 2015 KA_{71} | — | September 4, 2011 | Kitt Peak | Spacewatch | · | 1.5 km | MPC · JPL |
| 674075 | 2015 KD_{74} | — | October 27, 2008 | Mount Lemmon | Mount Lemmon Survey | · | 1.5 km | MPC · JPL |
| 674076 | 2015 KS_{78} | — | May 21, 2015 | Haleakala | Pan-STARRS 1 | EOS | 1.6 km | MPC · JPL |
| 674077 | 2015 KB_{83} | — | February 28, 2014 | Mount Lemmon | Mount Lemmon Survey | · | 1.9 km | MPC · JPL |
| 674078 | 2015 KT_{85} | — | October 26, 2011 | Haleakala | Pan-STARRS 1 | · | 2.8 km | MPC · JPL |
| 674079 | 2015 KC_{86} | — | February 21, 2009 | Kitt Peak | Spacewatch | · | 2.1 km | MPC · JPL |
| 674080 | 2015 KJ_{91} | — | May 21, 2015 | Haleakala | Pan-STARRS 1 | EOS | 1.3 km | MPC · JPL |
| 674081 | 2015 KN_{96} | — | September 4, 2011 | Haleakala | Pan-STARRS 1 | LIX | 2.8 km | MPC · JPL |
| 674082 | 2015 KD_{97} | — | October 23, 2011 | Haleakala | Pan-STARRS 1 | · | 2.1 km | MPC · JPL |
| 674083 | 2015 KC_{99} | — | November 24, 2008 | Mount Lemmon | Mount Lemmon Survey | · | 2.2 km | MPC · JPL |
| 674084 | 2015 KN_{100} | — | April 23, 2015 | Haleakala | Pan-STARRS 1 | · | 1.4 km | MPC · JPL |
| 674085 | 2015 KN_{101} | — | April 14, 2010 | Kitt Peak | Spacewatch | · | 1.8 km | MPC · JPL |
| 674086 | 2015 KF_{102} | — | March 30, 2015 | Haleakala | Pan-STARRS 1 | · | 1.7 km | MPC · JPL |
| 674087 | 2015 KA_{104} | — | October 25, 2011 | Haleakala | Pan-STARRS 1 | · | 2.0 km | MPC · JPL |
| 674088 | 2015 KO_{106} | — | January 28, 2014 | Kitt Peak | Spacewatch | · | 1.6 km | MPC · JPL |
| 674089 | 2015 KY_{107} | — | December 23, 2012 | Haleakala | Pan-STARRS 1 | · | 2.6 km | MPC · JPL |
| 674090 | 2015 KP_{109} | — | February 27, 2015 | Haleakala | Pan-STARRS 1 | · | 2.3 km | MPC · JPL |
| 674091 | 2015 KQ_{109} | — | September 14, 2006 | Kitt Peak | Spacewatch | · | 520 m | MPC · JPL |
| 674092 | 2015 KH_{114} | — | April 25, 2006 | Kitt Peak | Spacewatch | · | 1.6 km | MPC · JPL |
| 674093 | 2015 KA_{117} | — | February 20, 2014 | Mount Lemmon | Mount Lemmon Survey | AGN | 1.0 km | MPC · JPL |
| 674094 | 2015 KK_{118} | — | October 19, 2012 | Catalina | CSS | MAR | 1.1 km | MPC · JPL |
| 674095 | 2015 KX_{124} | — | March 27, 2011 | Mount Lemmon | Mount Lemmon Survey | · | 1.5 km | MPC · JPL |
| 674096 | 2015 KY_{130} | — | December 25, 2013 | Mount Lemmon | Mount Lemmon Survey | · | 1.7 km | MPC · JPL |
| 674097 | 2015 KJ_{131} | — | December 14, 2013 | Mount Lemmon | Mount Lemmon Survey | · | 1.5 km | MPC · JPL |
| 674098 | 2015 KD_{133} | — | April 23, 2015 | Kitt Peak | Spacewatch | TIN | 580 m | MPC · JPL |
| 674099 | 2015 KH_{134} | — | April 18, 2015 | Haleakala | Pan-STARRS 1 | · | 1.8 km | MPC · JPL |
| 674100 | 2015 KN_{134} | — | October 8, 2012 | Haleakala | Pan-STARRS 1 | · | 1.8 km | MPC · JPL |

== 674101–674200 ==
back to top

| Designation | | | Discovery | | | Properties | | Ref |
| Permanent | Provisional | Named after | Date | Site | Discoverer(s) | Category | Diam. | Ref |
|---|---|---|---|---|---|---|---|---|
| 674101 | 2015 KZ_{134} | — | October 22, 2012 | Haleakala | Pan-STARRS 1 | EUN | 1.2 km | MPC · JPL |
| 674102 | 2015 KB_{135} | — | April 12, 2004 | Kitt Peak | Spacewatch | · | 2.1 km | MPC · JPL |
| 674103 | 2015 KE_{135} | — | April 18, 2015 | Haleakala | Pan-STARRS 1 | · | 2.0 km | MPC · JPL |
| 674104 | 2015 KG_{136} | — | May 2, 2015 | Cerro Paranal | Altmann, M., Prusti, T. | · | 1.8 km | MPC · JPL |
| 674105 | 2015 KD_{138} | — | August 2, 2011 | Siding Spring | SSS | · | 1.6 km | MPC · JPL |
| 674106 | 2015 KH_{138} | — | November 20, 2000 | Kitt Peak | Spacewatch | · | 2.8 km | MPC · JPL |
| 674107 | 2015 KN_{140} | — | February 28, 2008 | Mount Lemmon | Mount Lemmon Survey | · | 580 m | MPC · JPL |
| 674108 | 2015 KA_{141} | — | October 21, 2012 | Haleakala | Pan-STARRS 1 | · | 1.5 km | MPC · JPL |
| 674109 | 2015 KJ_{141} | — | April 23, 2015 | Haleakala | Pan-STARRS 2 | · | 2.0 km | MPC · JPL |
| 674110 | 2015 KJ_{142} | — | May 13, 2015 | Mount Lemmon | Mount Lemmon Survey | · | 480 m | MPC · JPL |
| 674111 | 2015 KX_{142} | — | September 13, 2002 | Palomar | NEAT | · | 1.6 km | MPC · JPL |
| 674112 | 2015 KC_{145} | — | June 9, 2012 | Mount Lemmon | Mount Lemmon Survey | · | 710 m | MPC · JPL |
| 674113 | 2015 KU_{149} | — | April 20, 2015 | XuYi | PMO NEO Survey Program | HNS | 1.1 km | MPC · JPL |
| 674114 | 2015 KJ_{151} | — | January 22, 2015 | Haleakala | Pan-STARRS 1 | · | 1.7 km | MPC · JPL |
| 674115 | 2015 KZ_{152} | — | July 28, 2011 | Haleakala | Pan-STARRS 1 | · | 2.1 km | MPC · JPL |
| 674116 | 2015 KC_{157} | — | May 28, 2015 | Mount Lemmon | Mount Lemmon Survey | H | 340 m | MPC · JPL |
| 674117 | 2015 KO_{160} | — | October 30, 2009 | Mount Lemmon | Mount Lemmon Survey | · | 1.3 km | MPC · JPL |
| 674118 | 2015 KH_{162} | — | May 18, 2015 | Mauna Kea | D. J. Tholen | SDO | 566 km | MPC · JPL |
| 674119 | 2015 KF_{163} | — | August 25, 2012 | Catalina | CSS | · | 810 m | MPC · JPL |
| 674120 | 2015 KQ_{164} | — | May 18, 2015 | Haleakala | Pan-STARRS 1 | TIR | 2.5 km | MPC · JPL |
| 674121 | 2015 KR_{164} | — | May 19, 2015 | Haleakala | Pan-STARRS 1 | · | 1.9 km | MPC · JPL |
| 674122 | 2015 KL_{170} | — | October 26, 2008 | Mount Lemmon | Mount Lemmon Survey | · | 1.3 km | MPC · JPL |
| 674123 | 2015 KF_{179} | — | May 25, 2015 | Haleakala | Pan-STARRS 1 | · | 2.2 km | MPC · JPL |
| 674124 | 2015 KN_{179} | — | August 2, 2016 | Haleakala | Pan-STARRS 1 | · | 1.8 km | MPC · JPL |
| 674125 | 2015 KG_{181} | — | May 30, 2015 | Haleakala | Pan-STARRS 1 | · | 1.4 km | MPC · JPL |
| 674126 | 2015 KU_{181} | — | January 19, 2017 | Mount Lemmon | Mount Lemmon Survey | · | 660 m | MPC · JPL |
| 674127 | 2015 KY_{186} | — | May 18, 2015 | Mount Lemmon | Mount Lemmon Survey | · | 1.7 km | MPC · JPL |
| 674128 | 2015 KF_{190} | — | May 21, 2015 | Haleakala | Pan-STARRS 1 | · | 1.7 km | MPC · JPL |
| 674129 | 2015 KW_{190} | — | May 21, 2015 | Haleakala | Pan-STARRS 1 | · | 1.7 km | MPC · JPL |
| 674130 | 2015 KA_{194} | — | May 25, 2015 | Haleakala | Pan-STARRS 1 | KOR | 1.1 km | MPC · JPL |
| 674131 | 2015 KW_{195} | — | May 21, 2015 | Haleakala | Pan-STARRS 1 | · | 580 m | MPC · JPL |
| 674132 | 2015 KH_{198} | — | January 22, 2015 | Haleakala | Pan-STARRS 1 | · | 520 m | MPC · JPL |
| 674133 | 2015 KG_{200} | — | October 10, 2007 | Mount Lemmon | Mount Lemmon Survey | KOR | 1.2 km | MPC · JPL |
| 674134 | 2015 KM_{206} | — | May 21, 2015 | Haleakala | Pan-STARRS 1 | H | 410 m | MPC · JPL |
| 674135 | 2015 KT_{206} | — | May 21, 2015 | Haleakala | Pan-STARRS 1 | H | 330 m | MPC · JPL |
| 674136 | 2015 KG_{223} | — | May 20, 2015 | Cerro Tololo-DECam | DECam | · | 1.0 km | MPC · JPL |
| 674137 | 2015 KC_{235} | — | May 20, 2015 | Cerro Tololo-DECam | DECam | · | 1.5 km | MPC · JPL |
| 674138 | 2015 KH_{246} | — | May 20, 2015 | Cerro Tololo | DECam | EOS | 1.3 km | MPC · JPL |
| 674139 | 2015 KR_{254} | — | May 20, 2015 | Cerro Tololo-DECam | DECam | EOS | 1.2 km | MPC · JPL |
| 674140 | 2015 KS_{277} | — | May 20, 2015 | Cerro Tololo | DECam | EOS | 1.3 km | MPC · JPL |
| 674141 | 2015 KF_{319} | — | May 21, 2015 | Cerro Tololo | DECam | · | 1.7 km | MPC · JPL |
| 674142 | 2015 LR_{1} | — | April 4, 2015 | Haleakala | Pan-STARRS 1 | · | 1.8 km | MPC · JPL |
| 674143 | 2015 LU_{2} | — | April 2, 2006 | Bergisch Gladbach | W. Bickel | · | 1.6 km | MPC · JPL |
| 674144 | 2015 LF_{5} | — | October 13, 2007 | Mount Lemmon | Mount Lemmon Survey | 526 | 2.2 km | MPC · JPL |
| 674145 | 2015 LM_{11} | — | December 7, 2012 | Elena Remote | Oreshko, A., T. V. Krjačko | MAR | 1.3 km | MPC · JPL |
| 674146 | 2015 LA_{12} | — | October 9, 2007 | Mount Lemmon | Mount Lemmon Survey | EUN | 1.4 km | MPC · JPL |
| 674147 | 2015 LV_{19} | — | April 9, 2010 | Mount Lemmon | Mount Lemmon Survey | DOR | 2.2 km | MPC · JPL |
| 674148 | 2015 LP_{23} | — | August 4, 2003 | Haleakala | NEAT | EUN | 1.1 km | MPC · JPL |
| 674149 | 2015 LT_{23} | — | June 12, 2015 | Mount Lemmon | Mount Lemmon Survey | · | 1.9 km | MPC · JPL |
| 674150 | 2015 LT_{25} | — | October 7, 2008 | Mount Lemmon | Mount Lemmon Survey | · | 1.1 km | MPC · JPL |
| 674151 | 2015 LZ_{28} | — | July 29, 2011 | Siding Spring | SSS | · | 1.5 km | MPC · JPL |
| 674152 | 2015 LO_{30} | — | June 13, 2015 | Haleakala | Pan-STARRS 1 | · | 490 m | MPC · JPL |
| 674153 | 2015 LR_{30} | — | June 13, 2015 | Haleakala | Pan-STARRS 1 | · | 2.7 km | MPC · JPL |
| 674154 | 2015 LD_{32} | — | June 13, 2015 | Haleakala | Pan-STARRS 1 | · | 600 m | MPC · JPL |
| 674155 | 2015 LR_{33} | — | August 24, 2001 | Haleakala | NEAT | NYS | 730 m | MPC · JPL |
| 674156 | 2015 LQ_{34} | — | June 13, 2015 | Haleakala | Pan-STARRS 1 | · | 1.4 km | MPC · JPL |
| 674157 | 2015 LN_{36} | — | May 18, 2015 | Haleakala | Pan-STARRS 2 | · | 1.4 km | MPC · JPL |
| 674158 | 2015 LP_{39} | — | June 15, 2001 | Palomar | NEAT | · | 2.4 km | MPC · JPL |
| 674159 | 2015 LJ_{40} | — | February 3, 2009 | Mount Lemmon | Mount Lemmon Survey | · | 2.3 km | MPC · JPL |
| 674160 | 2015 LO_{40} | — | June 11, 2015 | Haleakala | Pan-STARRS 1 | · | 2.6 km | MPC · JPL |
| 674161 | 2015 LX_{42} | — | June 13, 2015 | Haleakala | Pan-STARRS 1 | · | 2.3 km | MPC · JPL |
| 674162 | 2015 LF_{43} | — | September 16, 2003 | Kitt Peak | Spacewatch | · | 1.3 km | MPC · JPL |
| 674163 | 2015 LO_{43} | — | June 2, 2015 | Cerro Tololo-DECam | DECam | · | 1.3 km | MPC · JPL |
| 674164 | 2015 LE_{44} | — | June 11, 2015 | Haleakala | Pan-STARRS 1 | · | 1.7 km | MPC · JPL |
| 674165 | 2015 LN_{45} | — | November 26, 2010 | Mount Lemmon | Mount Lemmon Survey | VER | 3.2 km | MPC · JPL |
| 674166 | 2015 LA_{47} | — | June 13, 2015 | Haleakala | Pan-STARRS 1 | · | 2.2 km | MPC · JPL |
| 674167 | 2015 LW_{51} | — | October 14, 2001 | Apache Point | SDSS Collaboration | · | 1.5 km | MPC · JPL |
| 674168 | 2015 LX_{53} | — | June 10, 2015 | Haleakala | Pan-STARRS 1 | (5) | 1.4 km | MPC · JPL |
| 674169 | 2015 LN_{62} | — | June 8, 2015 | Haleakala | Pan-STARRS 1 | · | 570 m | MPC · JPL |
| 674170 | 2015 MH_{2} | — | October 24, 2005 | Mauna Kea | A. Boattini | · | 1.5 km | MPC · JPL |
| 674171 | 2015 MR_{4} | — | November 21, 2008 | Kitt Peak | Spacewatch | PHO | 1.2 km | MPC · JPL |
| 674172 | 2015 MA_{5} | — | January 10, 2014 | Nogales | M. Schwartz, P. R. Holvorcem | · | 1.6 km | MPC · JPL |
| 674173 | 2015 MC_{8} | — | March 31, 2003 | Cerro Tololo | Deep Lens Survey | EOS | 1.3 km | MPC · JPL |
| 674174 | 2015 ML_{12} | — | February 28, 2014 | Haleakala | Pan-STARRS 1 | · | 1.5 km | MPC · JPL |
| 674175 | 2015 MM_{14} | — | November 7, 2007 | Kitt Peak | Spacewatch | · | 2.1 km | MPC · JPL |
| 674176 | 2015 MP_{15} | — | January 18, 2009 | Catalina | CSS | EUN | 1.1 km | MPC · JPL |
| 674177 | 2015 ML_{16} | — | April 24, 2015 | Haleakala | Pan-STARRS 1 | EUN | 1.1 km | MPC · JPL |
| 674178 | 2015 MD_{19} | — | September 12, 2007 | Mount Lemmon | Mount Lemmon Survey | · | 1.9 km | MPC · JPL |
| 674179 | 2015 MA_{21} | — | December 2, 2012 | Mount Lemmon | Mount Lemmon Survey | · | 1.8 km | MPC · JPL |
| 674180 | 2015 MX_{22} | — | October 19, 2012 | Haleakala | Pan-STARRS 1 | · | 1.6 km | MPC · JPL |
| 674181 | 2015 MA_{27} | — | September 12, 2007 | Mount Lemmon | Mount Lemmon Survey | AGN | 870 m | MPC · JPL |
| 674182 | 2015 MZ_{28} | — | May 13, 2015 | Mount Lemmon | Mount Lemmon Survey | BRA | 1.2 km | MPC · JPL |
| 674183 | 2015 MN_{32} | — | January 1, 2009 | Kitt Peak | Spacewatch | · | 2.1 km | MPC · JPL |
| 674184 | 2015 MG_{33} | — | June 18, 2015 | Haleakala | Pan-STARRS 1 | EOS | 1.3 km | MPC · JPL |
| 674185 | 2015 MR_{36} | — | May 21, 2015 | Haleakala | Pan-STARRS 1 | · | 1.9 km | MPC · JPL |
| 674186 | 2015 MT_{36} | — | April 10, 2010 | Kitt Peak | Spacewatch | · | 1.9 km | MPC · JPL |
| 674187 | 2015 ME_{38} | — | May 18, 2015 | Mount Lemmon | Mount Lemmon Survey | · | 1.8 km | MPC · JPL |
| 674188 | 2015 MY_{38} | — | December 12, 2012 | Mount Lemmon | Mount Lemmon Survey | · | 1.4 km | MPC · JPL |
| 674189 | 2015 MP_{40} | — | January 28, 2014 | Kitt Peak | Spacewatch | · | 2.4 km | MPC · JPL |
| 674190 | 2015 MV_{41} | — | March 16, 2009 | Catalina | CSS | · | 2.0 km | MPC · JPL |
| 674191 | 2015 MQ_{42} | — | June 18, 2015 | Haleakala | Pan-STARRS 1 | · | 2.6 km | MPC · JPL |
| 674192 | 2015 MR_{42} | — | March 30, 2015 | Haleakala | Pan-STARRS 1 | · | 1.6 km | MPC · JPL |
| 674193 | 2015 MP_{44} | — | October 8, 1996 | Kitt Peak | Spacewatch | · | 550 m | MPC · JPL |
| 674194 | 2015 MA_{48} | — | September 8, 2010 | Kitt Peak | Spacewatch | · | 2.3 km | MPC · JPL |
| 674195 | 2015 ME_{48} | — | January 20, 2013 | Kitt Peak | Spacewatch | · | 1.7 km | MPC · JPL |
| 674196 | 2015 MN_{48} | — | September 12, 2004 | Kitt Peak | Spacewatch | · | 2.5 km | MPC · JPL |
| 674197 | 2015 MP_{48} | — | June 17, 2015 | Haleakala | Pan-STARRS 1 | · | 700 m | MPC · JPL |
| 674198 | 2015 MD_{50} | — | June 17, 2015 | Haleakala | Pan-STARRS 1 | V | 520 m | MPC · JPL |
| 674199 | 2015 MK_{50} | — | September 11, 2004 | Kitt Peak | Spacewatch | · | 2.8 km | MPC · JPL |
| 674200 | 2015 MR_{50} | — | May 21, 2014 | Mount Lemmon | Mount Lemmon Survey | EOS | 1.8 km | MPC · JPL |

== 674201–674300 ==
back to top

| Designation | | | Discovery | | | Properties | | Ref |
| Permanent | Provisional | Named after | Date | Site | Discoverer(s) | Category | Diam. | Ref |
|---|---|---|---|---|---|---|---|---|
| 674201 | 2015 ME_{51} | — | November 23, 2006 | Mount Lemmon | Mount Lemmon Survey | · | 2.2 km | MPC · JPL |
| 674202 | 2015 MM_{53} | — | January 13, 2008 | Kitt Peak | Spacewatch | · | 1.7 km | MPC · JPL |
| 674203 | 2015 MD_{54} | — | June 22, 2015 | Kitt Peak | Spacewatch | · | 1.5 km | MPC · JPL |
| 674204 | 2015 MD_{55} | — | November 28, 2013 | Mount Lemmon | Mount Lemmon Survey | · | 2.8 km | MPC · JPL |
| 674205 | 2015 MT_{55} | — | April 20, 2015 | Haleakala | Pan-STARRS 1 | TIR | 2.1 km | MPC · JPL |
| 674206 | 2015 MN_{61} | — | October 27, 2005 | Mount Lemmon | Mount Lemmon Survey | THM | 1.7 km | MPC · JPL |
| 674207 | 2015 MN_{66} | — | June 22, 2015 | Haleakala | Pan-STARRS 1 | APO | 330 m | MPC · JPL |
| 674208 | 2015 MU_{67} | — | February 10, 2008 | Kitt Peak | Spacewatch | · | 2.2 km | MPC · JPL |
| 674209 | 2015 MH_{70} | — | June 16, 2015 | Haleakala | Pan-STARRS 1 | EOS | 1.6 km | MPC · JPL |
| 674210 | 2015 MS_{71} | — | October 24, 2011 | Haleakala | Pan-STARRS 1 | · | 2.2 km | MPC · JPL |
| 674211 | 2015 MP_{75} | — | September 30, 2005 | Mount Lemmon | Mount Lemmon Survey | · | 2.0 km | MPC · JPL |
| 674212 | 2015 MB_{79} | — | June 18, 2015 | Haleakala | Pan-STARRS 1 | · | 2.2 km | MPC · JPL |
| 674213 | 2015 ME_{83} | — | July 1, 2011 | Kitt Peak | Spacewatch | · | 1.4 km | MPC · JPL |
| 674214 | 2015 MP_{83} | — | October 3, 2011 | Cordell-Lorenz | D. T. Durig | · | 1.6 km | MPC · JPL |
| 674215 | 2015 ME_{84} | — | March 11, 2008 | Mount Lemmon | Mount Lemmon Survey | · | 590 m | MPC · JPL |
| 674216 | 2015 MY_{85} | — | November 11, 2006 | Catalina | CSS | · | 2.2 km | MPC · JPL |
| 674217 | 2015 MX_{86} | — | June 16, 2015 | Haleakala | Pan-STARRS 1 | · | 2.4 km | MPC · JPL |
| 674218 | 2015 MK_{90} | — | June 24, 2009 | Kitt Peak | Spacewatch | · | 3.3 km | MPC · JPL |
| 674219 | 2015 MV_{90} | — | August 30, 2002 | Anderson Mesa | LONEOS | (1547) | 1.2 km | MPC · JPL |
| 674220 | 2015 MV_{91} | — | July 4, 2005 | Palomar | NEAT | · | 470 m | MPC · JPL |
| 674221 | 2015 MT_{92} | — | April 23, 2015 | Haleakala | Pan-STARRS 1 | · | 640 m | MPC · JPL |
| 674222 | 2015 MD_{99} | — | June 23, 2015 | Haleakala | Pan-STARRS 1 | HYG | 2.1 km | MPC · JPL |
| 674223 | 2015 MX_{101} | — | October 16, 2007 | Mount Lemmon | Mount Lemmon Survey | · | 2.3 km | MPC · JPL |
| 674224 | 2015 MV_{105} | — | February 26, 2011 | Mount Lemmon | Mount Lemmon Survey | · | 540 m | MPC · JPL |
| 674225 | 2015 MJ_{106} | — | June 15, 2015 | Haleakala | Pan-STARRS 1 | · | 1.1 km | MPC · JPL |
| 674226 | 2015 MY_{106} | — | February 28, 2014 | Haleakala | Pan-STARRS 1 | · | 2.2 km | MPC · JPL |
| 674227 | 2015 MW_{112} | — | June 26, 2015 | Haleakala | Pan-STARRS 1 | EOS | 1.6 km | MPC · JPL |
| 674228 | 2015 MF_{114} | — | August 27, 2011 | Haleakala | Pan-STARRS 1 | EUN | 1.2 km | MPC · JPL |
| 674229 | 2015 MY_{114} | — | January 25, 2009 | Kitt Peak | Spacewatch | · | 2.1 km | MPC · JPL |
| 674230 | 2015 MH_{116} | — | June 24, 2015 | Mount Lemmon | Mount Lemmon Survey | H | 520 m | MPC · JPL |
| 674231 | 2015 MP_{117} | — | June 27, 2015 | Haleakala | Pan-STARRS 2 | EUN | 1.1 km | MPC · JPL |
| 674232 | 2015 MP_{120} | — | June 12, 2011 | Mount Lemmon | Mount Lemmon Survey | · | 1.4 km | MPC · JPL |
| 674233 | 2015 MU_{122} | — | January 20, 2013 | Mount Lemmon | Mount Lemmon Survey | · | 2.4 km | MPC · JPL |
| 674234 | 2015 MX_{122} | — | June 27, 2015 | Haleakala | Pan-STARRS 1 | EOS | 1.7 km | MPC · JPL |
| 674235 | 2015 MF_{126} | — | April 4, 2008 | Kitt Peak | Spacewatch | · | 540 m | MPC · JPL |
| 674236 | 2015 MQ_{126} | — | April 4, 2014 | Haleakala | Pan-STARRS 1 | HOF | 2.5 km | MPC · JPL |
| 674237 | 2015 MP_{128} | — | June 29, 2015 | Haleakala | Pan-STARRS 1 | · | 2.0 km | MPC · JPL |
| 674238 | 2015 MC_{129} | — | December 22, 2008 | Kitt Peak | Spacewatch | EUN | 1.3 km | MPC · JPL |
| 674239 | 2015 MA_{134} | — | August 24, 2003 | Palomar | NEAT | · | 1.3 km | MPC · JPL |
| 674240 | 2015 MD_{137} | — | April 7, 2014 | Mount Lemmon | Mount Lemmon Survey | LIX | 2.8 km | MPC · JPL |
| 674241 | 2015 MG_{137} | — | June 26, 2015 | Haleakala | Pan-STARRS 1 | VER | 1.9 km | MPC · JPL |
| 674242 | 2015 MV_{137} | — | June 23, 2015 | Haleakala | Pan-STARRS 1 | · | 1.8 km | MPC · JPL |
| 674243 | 2015 MM_{139} | — | June 16, 2015 | Haleakala | Pan-STARRS 1 | · | 2.4 km | MPC · JPL |
| 674244 | 2015 MQ_{139} | — | March 7, 2013 | Mount Lemmon | Mount Lemmon Survey | · | 2.4 km | MPC · JPL |
| 674245 | 2015 MR_{139} | — | April 29, 2014 | Haleakala | Pan-STARRS 1 | EOS | 1.5 km | MPC · JPL |
| 674246 | 2015 MF_{149} | — | June 28, 2015 | Haleakala | Pan-STARRS 1 | · | 2.1 km | MPC · JPL |
| 674247 | 2015 MS_{149} | — | June 29, 2015 | Haleakala | Pan-STARRS 1 | · | 2.7 km | MPC · JPL |
| 674248 | 2015 MX_{149} | — | February 8, 2013 | Haleakala | Pan-STARRS 1 | · | 2.5 km | MPC · JPL |
| 674249 | 2015 MR_{150} | — | June 25, 2015 | Haleakala | Pan-STARRS 1 | · | 3.2 km | MPC · JPL |
| 674250 | 2015 MT_{150} | — | June 27, 2015 | Haleakala | Pan-STARRS 1 | · | 2.9 km | MPC · JPL |
| 674251 | 2015 MU_{150} | — | June 17, 2015 | Haleakala | Pan-STARRS 1 | · | 680 m | MPC · JPL |
| 674252 | 2015 MZ_{150} | — | June 28, 2015 | Haleakala | Pan-STARRS 1 | · | 3.0 km | MPC · JPL |
| 674253 | 2015 MP_{152} | — | June 28, 2015 | Haleakala | Pan-STARRS 1 | (5651) | 2.2 km | MPC · JPL |
| 674254 | 2015 ML_{153} | — | November 4, 2005 | Mount Lemmon | Mount Lemmon Survey | · | 520 m | MPC · JPL |
| 674255 | 2015 MV_{155} | — | June 20, 2015 | Haleakala | Pan-STARRS 1 | T_{j} (2.97) | 2.9 km | MPC · JPL |
| 674256 | 2015 MR_{161} | — | September 25, 2016 | Haleakala | Pan-STARRS 1 | · | 2.4 km | MPC · JPL |
| 674257 | 2015 MX_{163} | — | June 20, 2015 | Haleakala | Pan-STARRS 1 | EOS | 1.4 km | MPC · JPL |
| 674258 | 2015 MZ_{163} | — | June 16, 2015 | Haleakala | Pan-STARRS 2 | · | 820 m | MPC · JPL |
| 674259 | 2015 MM_{165} | — | June 17, 2015 | Haleakala | Pan-STARRS 1 | · | 1.8 km | MPC · JPL |
| 674260 | 2015 MQ_{165} | — | June 27, 2015 | Haleakala | Pan-STARRS 1 | · | 2.1 km | MPC · JPL |
| 674261 | 2015 MS_{166} | — | June 24, 2015 | Mount Lemmon | Mount Lemmon Survey | H | 450 m | MPC · JPL |
| 674262 | 2015 MK_{170} | — | June 18, 2015 | Haleakala | Pan-STARRS 1 | · | 1.5 km | MPC · JPL |
| 674263 | 2015 MM_{170} | — | June 23, 2015 | Haleakala | Pan-STARRS 1 | · | 2.2 km | MPC · JPL |
| 674264 | 2015 MY_{174} | — | June 22, 2015 | Haleakala | Pan-STARRS 1 | · | 550 m | MPC · JPL |
| 674265 | 2015 MG_{175} | — | June 28, 2015 | Haleakala | Pan-STARRS 1 | · | 2.6 km | MPC · JPL |
| 674266 | 2015 MW_{177} | — | June 27, 2015 | Haleakala | Pan-STARRS 1 | · | 510 m | MPC · JPL |
| 674267 | 2015 MU_{182} | — | June 24, 2015 | Haleakala | Pan-STARRS 1 | (895) | 2.5 km | MPC · JPL |
| 674268 | 2015 MQ_{183} | — | June 24, 2015 | Haleakala | Pan-STARRS 1 | · | 2.4 km | MPC · JPL |
| 674269 | 2015 MG_{186} | — | June 22, 2015 | Haleakala | Pan-STARRS 1 | · | 2.6 km | MPC · JPL |
| 674270 | 2015 MQ_{186} | — | September 4, 2010 | Mount Lemmon | Mount Lemmon Survey | · | 1.9 km | MPC · JPL |
| 674271 | 2015 MP_{187} | — | June 26, 2015 | Haleakala | Pan-STARRS 1 | · | 3.0 km | MPC · JPL |
| 674272 | 2015 NR_{5} | — | August 1, 2001 | Palomar | NEAT | TIN | 1.2 km | MPC · JPL |
| 674273 | 2015 NH_{6} | — | June 23, 2015 | Haleakala | Pan-STARRS 1 | · | 2.1 km | MPC · JPL |
| 674274 | 2015 NQ_{7} | — | June 16, 2015 | Haleakala | Pan-STARRS 1 | URS | 2.7 km | MPC · JPL |
| 674275 | 2015 NV_{7} | — | June 23, 2015 | Haleakala | Pan-STARRS 1 | · | 1.7 km | MPC · JPL |
| 674276 | 2015 NR_{9} | — | February 28, 2014 | Haleakala | Pan-STARRS 1 | · | 2.2 km | MPC · JPL |
| 674277 | 2015 NK_{14} | — | February 13, 2007 | Mount Lemmon | Mount Lemmon Survey | · | 840 m | MPC · JPL |
| 674278 | 2015 NZ_{14} | — | October 14, 2012 | Mount Lemmon | Mount Lemmon Survey | · | 560 m | MPC · JPL |
| 674279 | 2015 NE_{18} | — | December 3, 2012 | Mount Lemmon | Mount Lemmon Survey | · | 530 m | MPC · JPL |
| 674280 | 2015 NG_{19} | — | March 8, 2008 | Mount Lemmon | Mount Lemmon Survey | · | 2.3 km | MPC · JPL |
| 674281 | 2015 NR_{19} | — | December 30, 2008 | Mount Lemmon | Mount Lemmon Survey | · | 1.1 km | MPC · JPL |
| 674282 | 2015 NT_{19} | — | February 22, 2003 | Palomar | NEAT | · | 1.5 km | MPC · JPL |
| 674283 | 2015 NX_{23} | — | August 25, 2003 | Palomar | NEAT | · | 1.4 km | MPC · JPL |
| 674284 | 2015 NJ_{25} | — | September 7, 2010 | Piszkés-tető | K. Sárneczky, Z. Kuli | · | 2.7 km | MPC · JPL |
| 674285 | 2015 NJ_{26} | — | July 12, 2015 | Haleakala | Pan-STARRS 1 | · | 2.3 km | MPC · JPL |
| 674286 | 2015 NW_{26} | — | April 5, 2014 | Haleakala | Pan-STARRS 1 | KOR | 1.2 km | MPC · JPL |
| 674287 | 2015 ND_{27} | — | September 24, 2011 | Mount Lemmon | Mount Lemmon Survey | · | 1.5 km | MPC · JPL |
| 674288 | 2015 NE_{27} | — | May 6, 2006 | Mount Lemmon | Mount Lemmon Survey | MAR | 1.1 km | MPC · JPL |
| 674289 | 2015 NP_{27} | — | January 16, 2013 | Mount Lemmon | Mount Lemmon Survey | TIR | 3.2 km | MPC · JPL |
| 674290 | 2015 NO_{28} | — | March 7, 2014 | Oukaïmeden | C. Rinner | TIN | 1.1 km | MPC · JPL |
| 674291 | 2015 NW_{28} | — | July 12, 2015 | Haleakala | Pan-STARRS 1 | EOS | 1.6 km | MPC · JPL |
| 674292 | 2015 NY_{28} | — | July 8, 2015 | Haleakala | Pan-STARRS 1 | PHO | 980 m | MPC · JPL |
| 674293 | 2015 NF_{32} | — | July 9, 2015 | Haleakala | Pan-STARRS 1 | · | 2.0 km | MPC · JPL |
| 674294 | 2015 NX_{35} | — | July 12, 2015 | Haleakala | Pan-STARRS 1 | EOS | 1.6 km | MPC · JPL |
| 674295 | 2015 NC_{36} | — | July 12, 2015 | Kitt Peak | Spacewatch | · | 2.3 km | MPC · JPL |
| 674296 | 2015 NP_{36} | — | February 17, 2013 | Mount Lemmon | Mount Lemmon Survey | · | 3.2 km | MPC · JPL |
| 674297 | 2015 OE_{2} | — | September 24, 2012 | Mount Lemmon | Mount Lemmon Survey | · | 640 m | MPC · JPL |
| 674298 | 2015 OW_{2} | — | June 20, 2015 | Haleakala | Pan-STARRS 2 | · | 660 m | MPC · JPL |
| 674299 | 2015 ON_{3} | — | July 5, 2010 | Kitt Peak | Spacewatch | EOS | 1.8 km | MPC · JPL |
| 674300 | 2015 OS_{4} | — | November 18, 2007 | Kitt Peak | Spacewatch | · | 1.9 km | MPC · JPL |

== 674301–674400 ==
back to top

| Designation | | | Discovery | | | Properties | | Ref |
| Permanent | Provisional | Named after | Date | Site | Discoverer(s) | Category | Diam. | Ref |
|---|---|---|---|---|---|---|---|---|
| 674301 | 2015 OQ_{6} | — | August 24, 2000 | Socorro | LINEAR | · | 1.3 km | MPC · JPL |
| 674302 | 2015 OU_{7} | — | June 19, 2015 | Mount Lemmon | Mount Lemmon Survey | · | 2.9 km | MPC · JPL |
| 674303 | 2015 OD_{9} | — | January 15, 2007 | Mauna Kea | P. A. Wiegert | · | 1.7 km | MPC · JPL |
| 674304 | 2015 OS_{9} | — | August 19, 2006 | Kitt Peak | Spacewatch | · | 1.9 km | MPC · JPL |
| 674305 | 2015 OU_{11} | — | July 11, 2015 | Haleakala | Pan-STARRS 1 | · | 2.2 km | MPC · JPL |
| 674306 | 2015 OW_{12} | — | July 18, 2015 | Haleakala | Pan-STARRS 1 | · | 1.9 km | MPC · JPL |
| 674307 | 2015 OE_{13} | — | March 21, 2001 | Kitt Peak | Spacewatch | · | 1.4 km | MPC · JPL |
| 674308 | 2015 OF_{16} | — | September 15, 2010 | Mount Lemmon | Mount Lemmon Survey | EOS | 1.5 km | MPC · JPL |
| 674309 | 2015 OH_{16} | — | February 8, 2011 | Mount Lemmon | Mount Lemmon Survey | · | 830 m | MPC · JPL |
| 674310 | 2015 OL_{17} | — | August 27, 2005 | Palomar | NEAT | · | 590 m | MPC · JPL |
| 674311 | 2015 OU_{17} | — | October 29, 2003 | Kitt Peak | Spacewatch | · | 1.5 km | MPC · JPL |
| 674312 | 2015 OZ_{19} | — | May 16, 2005 | Palomar | NEAT | · | 2.4 km | MPC · JPL |
| 674313 | 2015 OC_{21} | — | June 29, 2015 | Haleakala | Pan-STARRS 1 | · | 2.7 km | MPC · JPL |
| 674314 | 2015 OO_{22} | — | June 29, 2015 | Haleakala | Pan-STARRS 1 | EOS | 2.1 km | MPC · JPL |
| 674315 | 2015 OM_{23} | — | December 5, 2007 | Kitt Peak | Spacewatch | · | 2.6 km | MPC · JPL |
| 674316 | 2015 OP_{23} | — | March 28, 2014 | Mount Lemmon | Mount Lemmon Survey | EOS | 1.9 km | MPC · JPL |
| 674317 | 2015 OW_{23} | — | July 7, 2015 | Catalina | CSS | EUP | 3.1 km | MPC · JPL |
| 674318 | 2015 OO_{27} | — | January 2, 2012 | Mount Lemmon | Mount Lemmon Survey | · | 2.7 km | MPC · JPL |
| 674319 | 2015 OU_{27} | — | January 10, 2007 | Mount Lemmon | Mount Lemmon Survey | EOS | 2.0 km | MPC · JPL |
| 674320 | 2015 OB_{28} | — | October 31, 2005 | Mount Lemmon | Mount Lemmon Survey | · | 570 m | MPC · JPL |
| 674321 | 2015 OO_{29} | — | July 23, 2015 | Haleakala | Pan-STARRS 1 | · | 780 m | MPC · JPL |
| 674322 | 2015 OD_{30} | — | July 23, 2015 | Haleakala | Pan-STARRS 2 | EOS | 1.8 km | MPC · JPL |
| 674323 | 2015 OE_{30} | — | November 6, 2010 | Mount Lemmon | Mount Lemmon Survey | · | 2.4 km | MPC · JPL |
| 674324 | 2015 OJ_{32} | — | September 26, 2006 | Catalina | CSS | · | 2.0 km | MPC · JPL |
| 674325 | 2015 OY_{38} | — | November 22, 2012 | Kitt Peak | Spacewatch | (2076) | 650 m | MPC · JPL |
| 674326 | 2015 OU_{39} | — | March 25, 2014 | Catalina | CSS | · | 1.3 km | MPC · JPL |
| 674327 | 2015 OD_{40} | — | December 17, 2007 | Mount Lemmon | Mount Lemmon Survey | · | 2.2 km | MPC · JPL |
| 674328 | 2015 OF_{41} | — | August 15, 2001 | Haleakala | NEAT | · | 2.4 km | MPC · JPL |
| 674329 | 2015 OG_{42} | — | December 6, 2007 | Kitt Peak | Spacewatch | · | 2.6 km | MPC · JPL |
| 674330 | 2015 OS_{43} | — | September 7, 1999 | Socorro | LINEAR | · | 1.2 km | MPC · JPL |
| 674331 | 2015 OT_{43} | — | April 4, 2014 | Haleakala | Pan-STARRS 1 | · | 2.2 km | MPC · JPL |
| 674332 | 2015 OR_{45} | — | October 21, 2011 | Mount Lemmon | Mount Lemmon Survey | · | 2.4 km | MPC · JPL |
| 674333 | 2015 OK_{46} | — | September 13, 2005 | Kitt Peak | Spacewatch | · | 1.9 km | MPC · JPL |
| 674334 | 2015 OU_{46} | — | July 29, 2005 | Siding Spring | SSS | · | 690 m | MPC · JPL |
| 674335 | 2015 OJ_{47} | — | August 20, 2009 | Siding Spring | SSS | · | 3.5 km | MPC · JPL |
| 674336 | 2015 ON_{47} | — | July 25, 2015 | Haleakala | Pan-STARRS 1 | EOS | 1.7 km | MPC · JPL |
| 674337 | 2015 OK_{49} | — | June 17, 2015 | Haleakala | Pan-STARRS 1 | · | 620 m | MPC · JPL |
| 674338 | 2015 OO_{50} | — | July 26, 2015 | Haleakala | Pan-STARRS 1 | · | 2.1 km | MPC · JPL |
| 674339 | 2015 OQ_{50} | — | October 9, 2010 | Mount Lemmon | Mount Lemmon Survey | · | 2.5 km | MPC · JPL |
| 674340 | 2015 OZ_{50} | — | December 25, 2011 | Piszkés-tető | K. Sárneczky, S. Kürti | · | 2.0 km | MPC · JPL |
| 674341 | 2015 OL_{51} | — | October 25, 2011 | Haleakala | Pan-STARRS 1 | EOS | 2.1 km | MPC · JPL |
| 674342 | 2015 OU_{51} | — | November 17, 2011 | Mount Lemmon | Mount Lemmon Survey | · | 2.9 km | MPC · JPL |
| 674343 | 2015 OF_{52} | — | February 9, 2008 | Mount Lemmon | Mount Lemmon Survey | · | 2.2 km | MPC · JPL |
| 674344 | 2015 OV_{53} | — | March 6, 2008 | Mount Lemmon | Mount Lemmon Survey | · | 1.9 km | MPC · JPL |
| 674345 | 2015 OW_{57} | — | July 26, 2015 | Haleakala | Pan-STARRS 1 | · | 1.8 km | MPC · JPL |
| 674346 | 2015 OE_{58} | — | September 29, 2010 | Mount Lemmon | Mount Lemmon Survey | · | 2.8 km | MPC · JPL |
| 674347 | 2015 OH_{58} | — | October 31, 2010 | Mount Lemmon | Mount Lemmon Survey | · | 2.6 km | MPC · JPL |
| 674348 | 2015 OH_{59} | — | June 17, 2015 | Haleakala | Pan-STARRS 1 | · | 2.2 km | MPC · JPL |
| 674349 | 2015 OK_{59} | — | October 12, 2005 | Kitt Peak | Spacewatch | EOS | 1.5 km | MPC · JPL |
| 674350 | 2015 OP_{59} | — | July 26, 2015 | Haleakala | Pan-STARRS 1 | · | 3.2 km | MPC · JPL |
| 674351 | 2015 OM_{60} | — | May 21, 2014 | Haleakala | Pan-STARRS 1 | EOS | 1.5 km | MPC · JPL |
| 674352 | 2015 OQ_{60} | — | July 26, 2015 | Haleakala | Pan-STARRS 1 | (43176) | 2.7 km | MPC · JPL |
| 674353 | 2015 OV_{60} | — | April 25, 2014 | Kitt Peak | Spacewatch | · | 2.6 km | MPC · JPL |
| 674354 | 2015 OK_{61} | — | July 26, 2015 | Haleakala | Pan-STARRS 1 | · | 2.5 km | MPC · JPL |
| 674355 | 2015 OO_{61} | — | March 9, 2011 | Mount Lemmon | Mount Lemmon Survey | · | 610 m | MPC · JPL |
| 674356 | 2015 OL_{62} | — | December 8, 2012 | Mount Lemmon | Mount Lemmon Survey | · | 700 m | MPC · JPL |
| 674357 | 2015 OA_{63} | — | May 23, 2014 | Haleakala | Pan-STARRS 1 | TIR | 2.2 km | MPC · JPL |
| 674358 | 2015 OJ_{65} | — | August 18, 2010 | ESA OGS | ESA OGS | BRA | 1.9 km | MPC · JPL |
| 674359 | 2015 OY_{65} | — | October 20, 2011 | Haleakala | Pan-STARRS 1 | · | 2.2 km | MPC · JPL |
| 674360 | 2015 OE_{66} | — | November 16, 2007 | La Cañada | Lacruz, J. | · | 1.8 km | MPC · JPL |
| 674361 | 2015 OZ_{67} | — | February 20, 2009 | Mount Lemmon | Mount Lemmon Survey | EUN | 1.2 km | MPC · JPL |
| 674362 | 2015 OL_{69} | — | June 22, 2015 | Haleakala | Pan-STARRS 1 | · | 610 m | MPC · JPL |
| 674363 | 2015 OY_{69} | — | February 28, 2014 | Haleakala | Pan-STARRS 1 | · | 700 m | MPC · JPL |
| 674364 | 2015 OG_{74} | — | September 6, 2008 | Mount Lemmon | Mount Lemmon Survey | · | 630 m | MPC · JPL |
| 674365 | 2015 OY_{74} | — | July 19, 2015 | Haleakala | Pan-STARRS 1 | THB | 2.4 km | MPC · JPL |
| 674366 | 2015 OK_{75} | — | October 22, 2012 | Haleakala | Pan-STARRS 1 | · | 620 m | MPC · JPL |
| 674367 | 2015 OZ_{75} | — | July 16, 2002 | Palomar | NEAT | JUN | 1.1 km | MPC · JPL |
| 674368 | 2015 ON_{76} | — | October 3, 2002 | Palomar | NEAT | EUN | 1.3 km | MPC · JPL |
| 674369 | 2015 OH_{77} | — | November 14, 2010 | Palomar | Palomar Transient Factory | · | 3.4 km | MPC · JPL |
| 674370 | 2015 OK_{77} | — | October 23, 2012 | Haleakala | Pan-STARRS 1 | · | 660 m | MPC · JPL |
| 674371 | 2015 OO_{78} | — | July 14, 2015 | Haleakala | Pan-STARRS 1 | · | 640 m | MPC · JPL |
| 674372 | 2015 OO_{85} | — | March 13, 2004 | Palomar | NEAT | · | 2.6 km | MPC · JPL |
| 674373 | 2015 OU_{85} | — | January 30, 2008 | Catalina | CSS | · | 1.8 km | MPC · JPL |
| 674374 | 2015 OD_{88} | — | October 22, 2009 | Mount Lemmon | Mount Lemmon Survey | LUT | 3.9 km | MPC · JPL |
| 674375 | 2015 OG_{88} | — | July 23, 2015 | Haleakala | Pan-STARRS 1 | · | 1.9 km | MPC · JPL |
| 674376 | 2015 OO_{88} | — | March 31, 2008 | Mount Lemmon | Mount Lemmon Survey | EOS | 2.3 km | MPC · JPL |
| 674377 | 2015 OX_{89} | — | February 11, 2012 | Mount Lemmon | Mount Lemmon Survey | · | 2.8 km | MPC · JPL |
| 674378 | 2015 OP_{90} | — | January 31, 2009 | Mount Lemmon | Mount Lemmon Survey | · | 2.2 km | MPC · JPL |
| 674379 | 2015 OV_{90} | — | October 26, 2011 | Haleakala | Pan-STARRS 1 | · | 1.4 km | MPC · JPL |
| 674380 | 2015 OK_{91} | — | July 18, 2015 | Haleakala | Pan-STARRS 1 | · | 2.5 km | MPC · JPL |
| 674381 | 2015 OM_{91} | — | May 20, 2014 | Haleakala | Pan-STARRS 1 | VER | 2.2 km | MPC · JPL |
| 674382 | 2015 OG_{92} | — | May 4, 2014 | Mount Lemmon | Mount Lemmon Survey | · | 2.5 km | MPC · JPL |
| 674383 | 2015 OO_{92} | — | July 19, 2015 | Haleakala | Pan-STARRS 1 | · | 2.0 km | MPC · JPL |
| 674384 | 2015 OE_{93} | — | July 19, 2015 | Haleakala | Pan-STARRS 1 | · | 2.1 km | MPC · JPL |
| 674385 | 2015 OF_{93} | — | January 18, 2012 | Mount Lemmon | Mount Lemmon Survey | · | 2.5 km | MPC · JPL |
| 674386 | 2015 OY_{95} | — | March 19, 2013 | Haleakala | Pan-STARRS 1 | · | 1.7 km | MPC · JPL |
| 674387 | 2015 OZ_{100} | — | January 6, 2012 | Kitt Peak | Spacewatch | EOS | 1.5 km | MPC · JPL |
| 674388 | 2015 OM_{102} | — | July 25, 2015 | Haleakala | Pan-STARRS 1 | · | 2.6 km | MPC · JPL |
| 674389 | 2015 OV_{104} | — | March 18, 2013 | Mount Lemmon | Mount Lemmon Survey | · | 2.4 km | MPC · JPL |
| 674390 | 2015 OX_{105} | — | July 30, 2015 | Haleakala | Pan-STARRS 1 | PHO | 630 m | MPC · JPL |
| 674391 | 2015 OD_{106} | — | July 19, 2015 | Haleakala | Pan-STARRS 1 | · | 2.3 km | MPC · JPL |
| 674392 | 2015 OE_{106} | — | July 25, 2015 | Haleakala | Pan-STARRS 1 | (895) | 2.7 km | MPC · JPL |
| 674393 | 2015 OB_{107} | — | July 23, 2015 | Haleakala | Pan-STARRS 1 | · | 2.5 km | MPC · JPL |
| 674394 | 2015 OB_{108} | — | December 7, 2005 | Kitt Peak | Spacewatch | · | 690 m | MPC · JPL |
| 674395 | 2015 OH_{110} | — | July 25, 2015 | Haleakala | Pan-STARRS 1 | · | 650 m | MPC · JPL |
| 674396 | 2015 OM_{121} | — | December 23, 2016 | Haleakala | Pan-STARRS 1 | · | 2.5 km | MPC · JPL |
| 674397 | 2015 OT_{121} | — | July 19, 2015 | Haleakala | Pan-STARRS 1 | · | 2.4 km | MPC · JPL |
| 674398 | 2015 OW_{122} | — | July 19, 2015 | Haleakala | Pan-STARRS 1 | EOS | 1.8 km | MPC · JPL |
| 674399 | 2015 ON_{123} | — | July 24, 2015 | Haleakala | Pan-STARRS 1 | · | 570 m | MPC · JPL |
| 674400 | 2015 OJ_{125} | — | July 19, 2015 | Haleakala | Pan-STARRS 1 | ADE | 1.6 km | MPC · JPL |

== 674401–674500 ==
back to top

| Designation | | | Discovery | | | Properties | | Ref |
| Permanent | Provisional | Named after | Date | Site | Discoverer(s) | Category | Diam. | Ref |
|---|---|---|---|---|---|---|---|---|
| 674401 | 2015 OR_{126} | — | July 25, 2015 | Haleakala | Pan-STARRS 1 | · | 2.8 km | MPC · JPL |
| 674402 | 2015 OX_{132} | — | July 25, 2015 | Haleakala | Pan-STARRS 1 | · | 1.9 km | MPC · JPL |
| 674403 | 2015 OE_{138} | — | July 24, 2015 | Haleakala | Pan-STARRS 1 | (2076) | 720 m | MPC · JPL |
| 674404 | 2015 OP_{143} | — | July 24, 2015 | Haleakala | Pan-STARRS 1 | · | 480 m | MPC · JPL |
| 674405 | 2015 OM_{145} | — | April 2, 2011 | Kitt Peak | Spacewatch | · | 640 m | MPC · JPL |
| 674406 | 2015 OC_{149} | — | July 24, 2015 | Haleakala | Pan-STARRS 1 | EOS | 1.4 km | MPC · JPL |
| 674407 | 2015 OX_{149} | — | April 29, 2014 | Haleakala | Pan-STARRS 1 | VER | 2.2 km | MPC · JPL |
| 674408 | 2015 OB_{150} | — | July 28, 2015 | Haleakala | Pan-STARRS 1 | · | 2.4 km | MPC · JPL |
| 674409 | 2015 OU_{152} | — | November 25, 2010 | Mount Lemmon | Mount Lemmon Survey | LUT | 3.4 km | MPC · JPL |
| 674410 | 2015 OZ_{152} | — | July 25, 2015 | Haleakala | Pan-STARRS 1 | · | 2.3 km | MPC · JPL |
| 674411 | 2015 OP_{153} | — | July 25, 2015 | Haleakala | Pan-STARRS 1 | · | 2.5 km | MPC · JPL |
| 674412 | 2015 OX_{155} | — | November 4, 2005 | Mount Lemmon | Mount Lemmon Survey | · | 620 m | MPC · JPL |
| 674413 | 2015 OH_{162} | — | July 25, 2015 | Haleakala | Pan-STARRS 1 | · | 800 m | MPC · JPL |
| 674414 | 2015 PM_{2} | — | October 15, 2001 | Palomar | NEAT | · | 900 m | MPC · JPL |
| 674415 | 2015 PA_{4} | — | March 5, 2011 | Mount Lemmon | Mount Lemmon Survey | · | 710 m | MPC · JPL |
| 674416 | 2015 PE_{4} | — | June 18, 2015 | Haleakala | Pan-STARRS 1 | · | 2.8 km | MPC · JPL |
| 674417 | 2015 PJ_{10} | — | May 8, 2014 | Haleakala | Pan-STARRS 1 | · | 1.5 km | MPC · JPL |
| 674418 | 2015 PD_{12} | — | October 3, 2002 | Palomar | NEAT | JUN | 810 m | MPC · JPL |
| 674419 | 2015 PG_{13} | — | December 30, 2011 | Mount Lemmon | Mount Lemmon Survey | · | 2.4 km | MPC · JPL |
| 674420 | 2015 PF_{14} | — | January 7, 2010 | Mount Lemmon | Mount Lemmon Survey | · | 500 m | MPC · JPL |
| 674421 | 2015 PB_{16} | — | November 7, 2007 | Catalina | CSS | · | 1.7 km | MPC · JPL |
| 674422 | 2015 PD_{16} | — | June 19, 2015 | Haleakala | Pan-STARRS 1 | T_{j} (2.96) | 3.0 km | MPC · JPL |
| 674423 | 2015 PM_{16} | — | September 30, 2010 | La Sagra | OAM | TIR | 2.4 km | MPC · JPL |
| 674424 | 2015 PX_{21} | — | July 24, 2015 | Haleakala | Pan-STARRS 1 | · | 1.4 km | MPC · JPL |
| 674425 | 2015 PL_{25} | — | July 24, 2015 | Haleakala | Pan-STARRS 1 | · | 2.1 km | MPC · JPL |
| 674426 | 2015 PY_{27} | — | February 11, 2008 | Kitt Peak | Spacewatch | · | 2.3 km | MPC · JPL |
| 674427 | 2015 PQ_{28} | — | July 18, 2015 | Haleakala | Pan-STARRS 1 | · | 2.6 km | MPC · JPL |
| 674428 | 2015 PZ_{28} | — | September 14, 2006 | Kitt Peak | Spacewatch | KOR | 1.3 km | MPC · JPL |
| 674429 | 2015 PO_{29} | — | May 4, 2014 | Haleakala | Pan-STARRS 1 | · | 1.9 km | MPC · JPL |
| 674430 | 2015 PQ_{32} | — | August 8, 2015 | Haleakala | Pan-STARRS 1 | · | 3.1 km | MPC · JPL |
| 674431 | 2015 PX_{33} | — | September 18, 2010 | Mount Lemmon | Mount Lemmon Survey | · | 2.7 km | MPC · JPL |
| 674432 | 2015 PJ_{34} | — | August 13, 2006 | Palomar | NEAT | · | 2.3 km | MPC · JPL |
| 674433 | 2015 PH_{35} | — | December 23, 2012 | Haleakala | Pan-STARRS 1 | · | 810 m | MPC · JPL |
| 674434 | 2015 PD_{36} | — | December 4, 2007 | Mount Lemmon | Mount Lemmon Survey | · | 1.8 km | MPC · JPL |
| 674435 | 2015 PW_{36} | — | October 20, 2011 | Kitt Peak | Spacewatch | · | 1.9 km | MPC · JPL |
| 674436 | 2015 PE_{39} | — | August 9, 2015 | Haleakala | Pan-STARRS 1 | · | 2.3 km | MPC · JPL |
| 674437 | 2015 PY_{39} | — | August 9, 2015 | Haleakala | Pan-STARRS 1 | · | 520 m | MPC · JPL |
| 674438 | 2015 PY_{43} | — | December 25, 2011 | Kitt Peak | Spacewatch | · | 2.6 km | MPC · JPL |
| 674439 | 2015 PA_{44} | — | April 30, 2014 | Haleakala | Pan-STARRS 1 | · | 2.2 km | MPC · JPL |
| 674440 | 2015 PE_{49} | — | February 19, 2009 | Kitt Peak | Spacewatch | · | 2.2 km | MPC · JPL |
| 674441 | 2015 PR_{54} | — | June 8, 2008 | Kitt Peak | Spacewatch | · | 3.1 km | MPC · JPL |
| 674442 | 2015 PQ_{63} | — | January 10, 2013 | Haleakala | Pan-STARRS 1 | EOS | 1.4 km | MPC · JPL |
| 674443 | 2015 PY_{63} | — | June 21, 2007 | Mount Lemmon | Mount Lemmon Survey | · | 1 km | MPC · JPL |
| 674444 | 2015 PX_{65} | — | November 26, 2011 | Mount Lemmon | Mount Lemmon Survey | · | 2.1 km | MPC · JPL |
| 674445 | 2015 PD_{66} | — | June 26, 2015 | Haleakala | Pan-STARRS 1 | · | 610 m | MPC · JPL |
| 674446 | 2015 PY_{69} | — | November 7, 2008 | Mount Lemmon | Mount Lemmon Survey | · | 1.3 km | MPC · JPL |
| 674447 | 2015 PL_{72} | — | June 26, 2015 | Haleakala | Pan-STARRS 1 | · | 2.2 km | MPC · JPL |
| 674448 | 2015 PR_{72} | — | April 5, 2014 | Haleakala | Pan-STARRS 1 | THM | 1.9 km | MPC · JPL |
| 674449 | 2015 PJ_{73} | — | June 26, 2015 | Haleakala | Pan-STARRS 1 | (11097) | 2.2 km | MPC · JPL |
| 674450 | 2015 PF_{75} | — | June 26, 2015 | Haleakala | Pan-STARRS 1 | VER | 2.0 km | MPC · JPL |
| 674451 | 2015 PV_{77} | — | July 19, 2015 | Haleakala | Pan-STARRS 2 | · | 590 m | MPC · JPL |
| 674452 | 2015 PN_{84} | — | June 30, 2015 | Haleakala | Pan-STARRS 1 | · | 2.1 km | MPC · JPL |
| 674453 | 2015 PZ_{85} | — | January 19, 2007 | Mauna Kea | P. A. Wiegert | · | 2.4 km | MPC · JPL |
| 674454 | 2015 PR_{87} | — | October 28, 2011 | Mount Lemmon | Mount Lemmon Survey | · | 1.6 km | MPC · JPL |
| 674455 | 2015 PY_{89} | — | February 8, 2008 | Mount Lemmon | Mount Lemmon Survey | · | 1.9 km | MPC · JPL |
| 674456 | 2015 PN_{94} | — | April 6, 2014 | Kitt Peak | Spacewatch | HOF | 2.3 km | MPC · JPL |
| 674457 | 2015 PE_{95} | — | December 15, 2012 | ESA OGS | ESA OGS | · | 1.7 km | MPC · JPL |
| 674458 | 2015 PW_{99} | — | July 14, 2015 | Haleakala | Pan-STARRS 1 | · | 490 m | MPC · JPL |
| 674459 | 2015 PG_{103} | — | February 2, 2008 | Mount Lemmon | Mount Lemmon Survey | · | 1.7 km | MPC · JPL |
| 674460 | 2015 PZ_{110} | — | June 14, 2015 | Mount Lemmon | Mount Lemmon Survey | · | 2.7 km | MPC · JPL |
| 674461 | 2015 PM_{115} | — | May 8, 2014 | Haleakala | Pan-STARRS 1 | · | 1.8 km | MPC · JPL |
| 674462 | 2015 PV_{122} | — | March 27, 2014 | Haleakala | Pan-STARRS 1 | KOR | 1.2 km | MPC · JPL |
| 674463 | 2015 PF_{126} | — | July 9, 2015 | Kitt Peak | Spacewatch | · | 600 m | MPC · JPL |
| 674464 | 2015 PF_{127} | — | January 27, 2007 | Mount Lemmon | Mount Lemmon Survey | · | 2.2 km | MPC · JPL |
| 674465 | 2015 PK_{133} | — | August 10, 2015 | Haleakala | Pan-STARRS 1 | · | 1.4 km | MPC · JPL |
| 674466 | 2015 PV_{139} | — | November 17, 2011 | Mount Lemmon | Mount Lemmon Survey | · | 1.4 km | MPC · JPL |
| 674467 | 2015 PR_{141} | — | July 25, 2015 | Haleakala | Pan-STARRS 1 | · | 700 m | MPC · JPL |
| 674468 | 2015 PP_{142} | — | September 14, 2005 | Kitt Peak | Spacewatch | · | 1.9 km | MPC · JPL |
| 674469 | 2015 PV_{142} | — | October 23, 2001 | Palomar | NEAT | · | 2.3 km | MPC · JPL |
| 674470 | 2015 PZ_{142} | — | August 10, 2015 | Haleakala | Pan-STARRS 1 | · | 2.5 km | MPC · JPL |
| 674471 | 2015 PC_{143} | — | October 26, 2011 | Haleakala | Pan-STARRS 1 | EOS | 1.8 km | MPC · JPL |
| 674472 | 2015 PH_{145} | — | February 16, 2010 | Kitt Peak | Spacewatch | · | 980 m | MPC · JPL |
| 674473 | 2015 PG_{148} | — | January 19, 2012 | Kitt Peak | Spacewatch | · | 3.2 km | MPC · JPL |
| 674474 | 2015 PH_{159} | — | June 27, 2004 | Kitt Peak | Spacewatch | · | 2.5 km | MPC · JPL |
| 674475 | 2015 PN_{159} | — | May 23, 2014 | Haleakala | Pan-STARRS 1 | · | 2.2 km | MPC · JPL |
| 674476 | 2015 PR_{161} | — | October 12, 2010 | Mount Lemmon | Mount Lemmon Survey | HYG | 2.2 km | MPC · JPL |
| 674477 | 2015 PL_{164} | — | August 10, 2015 | Haleakala | Pan-STARRS 1 | · | 540 m | MPC · JPL |
| 674478 | 2015 PX_{166} | — | June 19, 2015 | Mount Lemmon | Mount Lemmon Survey | · | 1.1 km | MPC · JPL |
| 674479 | 2015 PZ_{166} | — | July 18, 2015 | Haleakala | Pan-STARRS 1 | · | 610 m | MPC · JPL |
| 674480 | 2015 PK_{170} | — | January 17, 2007 | Kitt Peak | Spacewatch | EOS | 2.1 km | MPC · JPL |
| 674481 | 2015 PZ_{172} | — | March 6, 2013 | Haleakala | Pan-STARRS 1 | · | 2.4 km | MPC · JPL |
| 674482 | 2015 PP_{182} | — | November 8, 2007 | Mount Lemmon | Mount Lemmon Survey | · | 1.8 km | MPC · JPL |
| 674483 | 2015 PX_{189} | — | August 10, 2015 | Haleakala | Pan-STARRS 1 | · | 600 m | MPC · JPL |
| 674484 | 2015 PF_{191} | — | November 26, 2012 | Mount Lemmon | Mount Lemmon Survey | · | 730 m | MPC · JPL |
| 674485 | 2015 PA_{192} | — | June 22, 2014 | Mount Lemmon | Mount Lemmon Survey | ELF | 2.7 km | MPC · JPL |
| 674486 | 2015 PT_{193} | — | August 10, 2015 | Haleakala | Pan-STARRS 1 | · | 880 m | MPC · JPL |
| 674487 | 2015 PW_{193} | — | August 10, 2015 | Haleakala | Pan-STARRS 1 | · | 2.3 km | MPC · JPL |
| 674488 | 2015 PZ_{193} | — | May 21, 2014 | Haleakala | Pan-STARRS 1 | EOS | 1.5 km | MPC · JPL |
| 674489 | 2015 PK_{195} | — | December 25, 2011 | Kitt Peak | Spacewatch | · | 2.0 km | MPC · JPL |
| 674490 | 2015 PE_{196} | — | May 9, 2014 | Haleakala | Pan-STARRS 1 | · | 1.4 km | MPC · JPL |
| 674491 | 2015 PF_{196} | — | June 24, 2014 | Mount Lemmon | Mount Lemmon Survey | EOS | 1.7 km | MPC · JPL |
| 674492 | 2015 PH_{196} | — | November 20, 2009 | Mount Lemmon | Mount Lemmon Survey | · | 660 m | MPC · JPL |
| 674493 | 2015 PW_{199} | — | September 28, 2011 | Kitt Peak | Spacewatch | · | 1.7 km | MPC · JPL |
| 674494 | 2015 PB_{202} | — | October 17, 2010 | Mount Lemmon | Mount Lemmon Survey | · | 2.1 km | MPC · JPL |
| 674495 | 2015 PK_{203} | — | July 24, 2015 | Haleakala | Pan-STARRS 1 | · | 3.0 km | MPC · JPL |
| 674496 | 2015 PN_{203} | — | September 29, 2010 | Mount Lemmon | Mount Lemmon Survey | · | 2.6 km | MPC · JPL |
| 674497 | 2015 PT_{205} | — | October 26, 2011 | Haleakala | Pan-STARRS 1 | · | 1.6 km | MPC · JPL |
| 674498 | 2015 PK_{206} | — | April 3, 2014 | Haleakala | Pan-STARRS 1 | · | 2.3 km | MPC · JPL |
| 674499 | 2015 PG_{207} | — | August 10, 2015 | Haleakala | Pan-STARRS 1 | · | 2.9 km | MPC · JPL |
| 674500 | 2015 PF_{209} | — | October 29, 2010 | Piszkés-tető | K. Sárneczky, S. Kürti | · | 3.7 km | MPC · JPL |

== 674501–674600 ==
back to top

| Designation | | | Discovery | | | Properties | | Ref |
| Permanent | Provisional | Named after | Date | Site | Discoverer(s) | Category | Diam. | Ref |
|---|---|---|---|---|---|---|---|---|
| 674501 | 2015 PU_{218} | — | August 10, 2015 | Haleakala | Pan-STARRS 1 | · | 2.8 km | MPC · JPL |
| 674502 | 2015 PY_{219} | — | September 5, 2010 | Charleston | R. Holmes | · | 2.8 km | MPC · JPL |
| 674503 | 2015 PN_{220} | — | August 10, 2015 | Haleakala | Pan-STARRS 1 | · | 3.2 km | MPC · JPL |
| 674504 | 2015 PW_{221} | — | July 25, 2015 | Haleakala | Pan-STARRS 1 | · | 1.3 km | MPC · JPL |
| 674505 | 2015 PX_{223} | — | August 10, 2015 | Haleakala | Pan-STARRS 1 | · | 2.8 km | MPC · JPL |
| 674506 | 2015 PN_{227} | — | December 9, 2010 | Mount Lemmon | Mount Lemmon Survey | H | 550 m | MPC · JPL |
| 674507 | 2015 PA_{230} | — | September 14, 2006 | Palomar | NEAT | · | 1.8 km | MPC · JPL |
| 674508 | 2015 PF_{235} | — | November 17, 2009 | Mount Lemmon | Mount Lemmon Survey | · | 470 m | MPC · JPL |
| 674509 | 2015 PM_{239} | — | July 25, 2015 | Haleakala | Pan-STARRS 1 | · | 2.3 km | MPC · JPL |
| 674510 | 2015 PE_{242} | — | June 26, 2015 | Haleakala | Pan-STARRS 1 | · | 1.6 km | MPC · JPL |
| 674511 | 2015 PF_{245} | — | October 15, 2007 | Mount Lemmon | Mount Lemmon Survey | · | 1.8 km | MPC · JPL |
| 674512 | 2015 PC_{252} | — | December 15, 2006 | Kitt Peak | Spacewatch | · | 2.0 km | MPC · JPL |
| 674513 | 2015 PX_{254} | — | July 5, 2005 | Kitt Peak | Spacewatch | · | 1.9 km | MPC · JPL |
| 674514 | 2015 PW_{262} | — | October 13, 2010 | Mount Lemmon | Mount Lemmon Survey | VER | 2.2 km | MPC · JPL |
| 674515 | 2015 PZ_{263} | — | November 6, 2007 | Kitt Peak | Spacewatch | AGN | 1.2 km | MPC · JPL |
| 674516 | 2015 PJ_{264} | — | November 1, 2005 | Kitt Peak | Spacewatch | THM | 2.4 km | MPC · JPL |
| 674517 | 2015 PZ_{265} | — | May 14, 2008 | Mount Lemmon | Mount Lemmon Survey | · | 540 m | MPC · JPL |
| 674518 | 2015 PG_{269} | — | January 5, 2013 | Kitt Peak | Spacewatch | PHO | 500 m | MPC · JPL |
| 674519 | 2015 PR_{275} | — | August 11, 2015 | Haleakala | Pan-STARRS 1 | · | 2.2 km | MPC · JPL |
| 674520 | 2015 PB_{276} | — | November 6, 2010 | Kitt Peak | Spacewatch | · | 1.9 km | MPC · JPL |
| 674521 | 2015 PG_{279} | — | August 11, 2015 | Haleakala | Pan-STARRS 1 | · | 560 m | MPC · JPL |
| 674522 | 2015 PO_{279} | — | May 7, 2014 | Haleakala | Pan-STARRS 1 | EOS | 1.6 km | MPC · JPL |
| 674523 | 2015 PW_{280} | — | October 9, 2004 | Kitt Peak | Spacewatch | · | 2.9 km | MPC · JPL |
| 674524 | 2015 PZ_{280} | — | February 14, 2013 | Kitt Peak | Spacewatch | · | 1.7 km | MPC · JPL |
| 674525 | 2015 PJ_{281} | — | April 25, 2014 | Mount Lemmon | Mount Lemmon Survey | · | 2.5 km | MPC · JPL |
| 674526 | 2015 PK_{282} | — | May 28, 2014 | Mount Lemmon | Mount Lemmon Survey | EOS | 2.0 km | MPC · JPL |
| 674527 | 2015 PE_{283} | — | April 6, 2008 | Mount Lemmon | Mount Lemmon Survey | EOS | 1.7 km | MPC · JPL |
| 674528 | 2015 PR_{286} | — | May 23, 2011 | Nogales | M. Schwartz, P. R. Holvorcem | V | 510 m | MPC · JPL |
| 674529 | 2015 PA_{288} | — | August 12, 2015 | Haleakala | Pan-STARRS 1 | · | 2.7 km | MPC · JPL |
| 674530 | 2015 PR_{288} | — | April 23, 2014 | Mount Lemmon | Mount Lemmon Survey | GEF | 1.3 km | MPC · JPL |
| 674531 | 2015 PM_{290} | — | November 21, 2008 | Mount Lemmon | Mount Lemmon Survey | · | 970 m | MPC · JPL |
| 674532 | 2015 PN_{290} | — | August 24, 2006 | Palomar | NEAT | · | 2.2 km | MPC · JPL |
| 674533 | 2015 PE_{291} | — | June 24, 2014 | Haleakala | Pan-STARRS 1 | · | 2.2 km | MPC · JPL |
| 674534 | 2015 PO_{291} | — | November 24, 2011 | Catalina | CSS | · | 1.1 km | MPC · JPL |
| 674535 | 2015 PE_{293} | — | July 19, 2015 | Haleakala | Pan-STARRS 1 | · | 2.8 km | MPC · JPL |
| 674536 | 2015 PD_{294} | — | October 28, 2011 | Kitt Peak | Spacewatch | · | 1.8 km | MPC · JPL |
| 674537 | 2015 PO_{294} | — | July 23, 2015 | Haleakala | Pan-STARRS 1 | · | 890 m | MPC · JPL |
| 674538 | 2015 PA_{295} | — | March 17, 2013 | Nogales | M. Schwartz, P. R. Holvorcem | · | 3.1 km | MPC · JPL |
| 674539 | 2015 PT_{296} | — | March 5, 2008 | Mount Lemmon | Mount Lemmon Survey | 615 | 1.5 km | MPC · JPL |
| 674540 | 2015 PM_{300} | — | August 13, 2015 | Haleakala | Pan-STARRS 1 | · | 2.5 km | MPC · JPL |
| 674541 | 2015 PQ_{305} | — | April 15, 2004 | Bergisch Gladbach | W. Bickel | · | 1.9 km | MPC · JPL |
| 674542 | 2015 PG_{306} | — | August 13, 2015 | Haleakala | Pan-STARRS 1 | VER | 2.2 km | MPC · JPL |
| 674543 | 2015 PU_{307} | — | October 14, 2012 | Kitt Peak | Spacewatch | · | 560 m | MPC · JPL |
| 674544 | 2015 PV_{307} | — | August 28, 2006 | Catalina | CSS | EUN | 1.3 km | MPC · JPL |
| 674545 | 2015 PS_{311} | — | September 29, 2009 | Mount Lemmon | Mount Lemmon Survey | · | 760 m | MPC · JPL |
| 674546 | 2015 PF_{312} | — | August 14, 2015 | Cerro Tololo | DECam | cubewano (hot) | 268 km | MPC · JPL |
| 674547 | 2015 PH_{312} | — | September 6, 2008 | Catalina | CSS | · | 660 m | MPC · JPL |
| 674548 | 2015 PA_{318} | — | October 31, 2010 | Piszkés-tető | K. Sárneczky, Z. Kuli | · | 2.6 km | MPC · JPL |
| 674549 | 2015 PH_{319} | — | October 30, 2010 | Mount Lemmon | Mount Lemmon Survey | · | 2.6 km | MPC · JPL |
| 674550 | 2015 PG_{323} | — | August 7, 2015 | Haleakala | Pan-STARRS 1 | EOS | 1.5 km | MPC · JPL |
| 674551 | 2015 PL_{323} | — | September 8, 2016 | Haleakala | Pan-STARRS 1 | · | 2.2 km | MPC · JPL |
| 674552 | 2015 PT_{323} | — | August 12, 2015 | Haleakala | Pan-STARRS 1 | H | 440 m | MPC · JPL |
| 674553 | 2015 PD_{324} | — | August 14, 2015 | Haleakala | Pan-STARRS 1 | · | 2.9 km | MPC · JPL |
| 674554 | 2015 PX_{325} | — | January 14, 2018 | Mount Lemmon | Mount Lemmon Survey | · | 2.4 km | MPC · JPL |
| 674555 | 2015 PG_{326} | — | August 11, 2015 | Haleakala | Pan-STARRS 1 | · | 630 m | MPC · JPL |
| 674556 | 2015 PA_{332} | — | August 14, 2015 | Haleakala | Pan-STARRS 1 | · | 1.9 km | MPC · JPL |
| 674557 | 2015 PG_{332} | — | August 6, 2015 | Haleakala | Pan-STARRS 1 | EOS | 1.6 km | MPC · JPL |
| 674558 | 2015 PS_{332} | — | August 12, 2015 | Haleakala | Pan-STARRS 1 | · | 910 m | MPC · JPL |
| 674559 | 2015 PZ_{332} | — | April 6, 2008 | Kitt Peak | Spacewatch | · | 2.5 km | MPC · JPL |
| 674560 | 2015 PN_{334} | — | August 12, 2015 | Haleakala | Pan-STARRS 1 | · | 2.6 km | MPC · JPL |
| 674561 | 2015 PA_{338} | — | August 9, 2015 | Haleakala | Pan-STARRS 1 | EOS | 1.7 km | MPC · JPL |
| 674562 | 2015 PY_{348} | — | April 23, 2014 | Cerro Tololo | DECam | (1298) | 2.2 km | MPC · JPL |
| 674563 | 2015 PM_{349} | — | August 5, 2015 | Haleakala | Pan-STARRS 1 | · | 2.3 km | MPC · JPL |
| 674564 | 2015 PB_{350} | — | August 10, 2015 | Haleakala | Pan-STARRS 1 | · | 2.3 km | MPC · JPL |
| 674565 | 2015 PY_{358} | — | August 14, 2015 | Haleakala | Pan-STARRS 1 | V | 410 m | MPC · JPL |
| 674566 | 2015 PP_{361} | — | August 9, 2015 | Haleakala | Pan-STARRS 1 | · | 470 m | MPC · JPL |
| 674567 | 2015 QX_{2} | — | November 7, 2012 | Mount Lemmon | Mount Lemmon Survey | · | 600 m | MPC · JPL |
| 674568 | 2015 QB_{4} | — | January 25, 2007 | Kitt Peak | Spacewatch | EOS | 2.2 km | MPC · JPL |
| 674569 | 2015 QG_{4} | — | August 9, 2015 | Haleakala | Pan-STARRS 1 | · | 2.3 km | MPC · JPL |
| 674570 | 2015 QU_{4} | — | December 18, 2003 | Kitt Peak | Spacewatch | · | 1.7 km | MPC · JPL |
| 674571 | 2015 QS_{7} | — | October 5, 2005 | Mount Lemmon | Mount Lemmon Survey | EOS | 2.0 km | MPC · JPL |
| 674572 | 2015 QF_{8} | — | March 5, 2013 | Haleakala | Pan-STARRS 1 | · | 3.0 km | MPC · JPL |
| 674573 | 2015 QU_{9} | — | June 13, 2010 | Mount Lemmon | Mount Lemmon Survey | · | 3.2 km | MPC · JPL |
| 674574 | 2015 QP_{11} | — | July 28, 2009 | Catalina | CSS | · | 3.0 km | MPC · JPL |
| 674575 | 2015 QE_{14} | — | February 17, 2013 | Kitt Peak | Spacewatch | WIT | 880 m | MPC · JPL |
| 674576 | 2015 QH_{14} | — | June 5, 2014 | Haleakala | Pan-STARRS 1 | LIX | 3.4 km | MPC · JPL |
| 674577 | 2015 QP_{15} | — | August 20, 2015 | Kitt Peak | Spacewatch | · | 2.4 km | MPC · JPL |
| 674578 | 2015 QF_{17} | — | September 18, 2010 | Mount Lemmon | Mount Lemmon Survey | · | 1.6 km | MPC · JPL |
| 674579 | 2015 QK_{17} | — | October 21, 2011 | Ka-Dar | Gerke, V. | · | 1.8 km | MPC · JPL |
| 674580 | 2015 QL_{17} | — | August 21, 2015 | Haleakala | Pan-STARRS 1 | · | 2.7 km | MPC · JPL |
| 674581 | 2015 QC_{18} | — | December 5, 2005 | Kitt Peak | Spacewatch | · | 910 m | MPC · JPL |
| 674582 | 2015 QH_{18} | — | October 14, 2010 | Mount Lemmon | Mount Lemmon Survey | · | 2.2 km | MPC · JPL |
| 674583 | 2015 QF_{19} | — | August 1, 2000 | Kitt Peak | Spacewatch | · | 2.3 km | MPC · JPL |
| 674584 | 2015 QG_{19} | — | November 1, 2010 | Catalina | CSS | · | 2.8 km | MPC · JPL |
| 674585 | 2015 QP_{19} | — | August 21, 2015 | Haleakala | Pan-STARRS 1 | · | 1.9 km | MPC · JPL |
| 674586 | 2015 QA_{25} | — | August 28, 2015 | Haleakala | Pan-STARRS 1 | · | 3.0 km | MPC · JPL |
| 674587 | 2015 QF_{25} | — | March 17, 2013 | Mount Lemmon | Mount Lemmon Survey | EOS | 1.6 km | MPC · JPL |
| 674588 | 2015 QJ_{25} | — | August 21, 2015 | Haleakala | Pan-STARRS 1 | ELF | 3.0 km | MPC · JPL |
| 674589 | 2015 QE_{26} | — | August 21, 2015 | Haleakala | Pan-STARRS 1 | · | 2.6 km | MPC · JPL |
| 674590 | 2015 RH_{2} | — | August 21, 2015 | Haleakala | Pan-STARRS 1 | APO · PHA | 140 m | MPC · JPL |
| 674591 | 2015 RZ_{6} | — | August 30, 2005 | Kitt Peak | Spacewatch | · | 470 m | MPC · JPL |
| 674592 | 2015 RE_{8} | — | June 26, 2011 | Mount Lemmon | Mount Lemmon Survey | · | 1.1 km | MPC · JPL |
| 674593 | 2015 RK_{10} | — | September 27, 2011 | Mount Lemmon | Mount Lemmon Survey | · | 2.5 km | MPC · JPL |
| 674594 | 2015 RN_{11} | — | August 29, 2005 | Kitt Peak | Spacewatch | KOR | 1.3 km | MPC · JPL |
| 674595 | 2015 RS_{11} | — | July 12, 2015 | Haleakala | Pan-STARRS 1 | · | 2.2 km | MPC · JPL |
| 674596 | 2015 RX_{15} | — | November 15, 1998 | Kitt Peak | Spacewatch | · | 2.5 km | MPC · JPL |
| 674597 | 2015 RL_{16} | — | June 27, 2015 | Haleakala | Pan-STARRS 1 | (1118) | 2.5 km | MPC · JPL |
| 674598 | 2015 RZ_{17} | — | March 28, 2012 | Mount Lemmon | Mount Lemmon Survey | T_{j} (2.99) · EUP | 3.1 km | MPC · JPL |
| 674599 | 2015 RK_{18} | — | July 23, 2015 | Haleakala | Pan-STARRS 1 | V | 500 m | MPC · JPL |
| 674600 | 2015 RF_{19} | — | July 25, 2015 | Haleakala | Pan-STARRS 1 | · | 700 m | MPC · JPL |

== 674601–674700 ==
back to top

| Designation | | | Discovery | | | Properties | | Ref |
| Permanent | Provisional | Named after | Date | Site | Discoverer(s) | Category | Diam. | Ref |
|---|---|---|---|---|---|---|---|---|
| 674601 | 2015 RT_{19} | — | February 10, 2008 | Kitt Peak | Spacewatch | · | 2.1 km | MPC · JPL |
| 674602 | 2015 RV_{20} | — | February 2, 2005 | Catalina | CSS | · | 1.5 km | MPC · JPL |
| 674603 | 2015 RC_{21} | — | April 20, 2009 | Kitt Peak | Spacewatch | · | 2.2 km | MPC · JPL |
| 674604 | 2015 RA_{26} | — | January 24, 2010 | Bisei | BATTeRS | · | 600 m | MPC · JPL |
| 674605 | 2015 RS_{27} | — | May 1, 2009 | Kitt Peak | Spacewatch | HNS | 1.2 km | MPC · JPL |
| 674606 | 2015 RU_{27} | — | November 28, 2011 | Catalina | CSS | · | 1.2 km | MPC · JPL |
| 674607 | 2015 RG_{28} | — | May 9, 2006 | Mount Lemmon | Mount Lemmon Survey | · | 1.6 km | MPC · JPL |
| 674608 | 2015 RY_{28} | — | September 7, 2008 | Mount Lemmon | Mount Lemmon Survey | · | 750 m | MPC · JPL |
| 674609 | 2015 RP_{29} | — | June 22, 2015 | Haleakala | Pan-STARRS 1 | TIR | 2.4 km | MPC · JPL |
| 674610 | 2015 RN_{30} | — | September 21, 2004 | Socorro | LINEAR | · | 900 m | MPC · JPL |
| 674611 | 2015 RD_{31} | — | September 8, 2015 | XuYi | PMO NEO Survey Program | · | 910 m | MPC · JPL |
| 674612 | 2015 RC_{32} | — | March 25, 2009 | Mount Lemmon | Mount Lemmon Survey | · | 2.4 km | MPC · JPL |
| 674613 | 2015 RH_{34} | — | November 7, 2005 | Mauna Kea | A. Boattini | · | 3.4 km | MPC · JPL |
| 674614 | 2015 RO_{34} | — | September 9, 2015 | Haleakala | Pan-STARRS 1 | H | 450 m | MPC · JPL |
| 674615 | 2015 RW_{38} | — | July 25, 2015 | Haleakala | Pan-STARRS 1 | H | 280 m | MPC · JPL |
| 674616 | 2015 RH_{40} | — | January 25, 2007 | Kitt Peak | Spacewatch | · | 600 m | MPC · JPL |
| 674617 | 2015 RO_{42} | — | August 27, 2005 | Palomar | NEAT | · | 2.2 km | MPC · JPL |
| 674618 | 2015 RM_{43} | — | September 7, 2004 | Goodricke-Pigott | R. A. Tucker | H | 600 m | MPC · JPL |
| 674619 | 2015 RY_{48} | — | May 25, 2011 | Mount Lemmon | Mount Lemmon Survey | · | 560 m | MPC · JPL |
| 674620 | 2015 RK_{50} | — | September 27, 2008 | Mount Lemmon | Mount Lemmon Survey | · | 980 m | MPC · JPL |
| 674621 | 2015 RD_{51} | — | May 26, 2014 | Haleakala | Pan-STARRS 1 | · | 2.6 km | MPC · JPL |
| 674622 | 2015 RN_{51} | — | September 10, 2015 | Haleakala | Pan-STARRS 1 | · | 2.0 km | MPC · JPL |
| 674623 | 2015 RB_{52} | — | March 5, 2013 | Haleakala | Pan-STARRS 1 | · | 1.9 km | MPC · JPL |
| 674624 | 2015 RE_{52} | — | March 11, 2011 | Kitt Peak | Spacewatch | · | 580 m | MPC · JPL |
| 674625 | 2015 RF_{53} | — | July 23, 2015 | Haleakala | Pan-STARRS 1 | EOS | 1.8 km | MPC · JPL |
| 674626 | 2015 RH_{54} | — | January 27, 2003 | Kitt Peak | Spacewatch | · | 730 m | MPC · JPL |
| 674627 | 2015 RL_{55} | — | November 3, 2010 | Mount Lemmon | Mount Lemmon Survey | · | 2.3 km | MPC · JPL |
| 674628 | 2015 RN_{55} | — | July 23, 2015 | Haleakala | Pan-STARRS 1 | · | 2.3 km | MPC · JPL |
| 674629 | 2015 RB_{59} | — | November 7, 2007 | Kitt Peak | Spacewatch | · | 1.3 km | MPC · JPL |
| 674630 | 2015 RT_{60} | — | September 23, 2008 | Kitt Peak | Spacewatch | · | 890 m | MPC · JPL |
| 674631 | 2015 RL_{63} | — | July 23, 2015 | Haleakala | Pan-STARRS 1 | THB | 2.3 km | MPC · JPL |
| 674632 | 2015 RT_{64} | — | September 10, 2015 | Haleakala | Pan-STARRS 1 | · | 2.5 km | MPC · JPL |
| 674633 | 2015 RE_{68} | — | July 23, 2015 | Haleakala | Pan-STARRS 1 | · | 570 m | MPC · JPL |
| 674634 | 2015 RB_{69} | — | September 23, 2001 | Kitt Peak | Spacewatch | · | 2.5 km | MPC · JPL |
| 674635 | 2015 RJ_{69} | — | August 31, 2005 | Kitt Peak | Spacewatch | · | 640 m | MPC · JPL |
| 674636 | 2015 RW_{70} | — | October 2, 2006 | Mount Lemmon | Mount Lemmon Survey | AGN | 1.2 km | MPC · JPL |
| 674637 | 2015 RV_{71} | — | September 20, 2009 | Mount Lemmon | Mount Lemmon Survey | · | 2.8 km | MPC · JPL |
| 674638 | 2015 RZ_{71} | — | October 29, 2010 | Mount Lemmon | Mount Lemmon Survey | EOS | 1.6 km | MPC · JPL |
| 674639 | 2015 RD_{73} | — | October 26, 2011 | Haleakala | Pan-STARRS 1 | · | 1.4 km | MPC · JPL |
| 674640 | 2015 RO_{73} | — | September 25, 2005 | Kitt Peak | Spacewatch | · | 610 m | MPC · JPL |
| 674641 | 2015 RP_{76} | — | September 10, 2015 | Haleakala | Pan-STARRS 1 | · | 660 m | MPC · JPL |
| 674642 | 2015 RT_{76} | — | March 17, 2013 | Mount Lemmon | Mount Lemmon Survey | · | 2.7 km | MPC · JPL |
| 674643 | 2015 RB_{78} | — | October 10, 2004 | Kitt Peak | Spacewatch | VER | 2.0 km | MPC · JPL |
| 674644 | 2015 RG_{78} | — | January 20, 2013 | Kitt Peak | Spacewatch | · | 1.0 km | MPC · JPL |
| 674645 | 2015 RD_{79} | — | September 10, 2015 | Haleakala | Pan-STARRS 1 | · | 2.5 km | MPC · JPL |
| 674646 | 2015 RG_{79} | — | September 12, 2004 | Kitt Peak | Spacewatch | THM | 1.8 km | MPC · JPL |
| 674647 | 2015 RB_{80} | — | October 12, 2010 | Mount Lemmon | Mount Lemmon Survey | · | 1.8 km | MPC · JPL |
| 674648 | 2015 RD_{80} | — | July 23, 2015 | Haleakala | Pan-STARRS 1 | ADE | 1.3 km | MPC · JPL |
| 674649 | 2015 RM_{80} | — | September 10, 2015 | Haleakala | Pan-STARRS 1 | · | 2.5 km | MPC · JPL |
| 674650 | 2015 RF_{84} | — | September 17, 2002 | Haleakala | NEAT | EUN | 1.2 km | MPC · JPL |
| 674651 | 2015 RQ_{86} | — | October 11, 2010 | Mount Lemmon | Mount Lemmon Survey | · | 2.4 km | MPC · JPL |
| 674652 | 2015 RL_{89} | — | September 12, 2015 | Space Surveillance | Space Surveillance Telescope | · | 1.6 km | MPC · JPL |
| 674653 | 2015 RS_{89} | — | January 6, 2006 | Catalina | CSS | · | 2.3 km | MPC · JPL |
| 674654 | 2015 RM_{90} | — | September 11, 2004 | Kitt Peak | Spacewatch | NYS | 1.1 km | MPC · JPL |
| 674655 | 2015 RU_{91} | — | July 28, 2015 | XuYi | PMO NEO Survey Program | · | 700 m | MPC · JPL |
| 674656 | 2015 RV_{92} | — | November 20, 2003 | Socorro | LINEAR | · | 1.8 km | MPC · JPL |
| 674657 | 2015 RF_{93} | — | June 22, 2011 | Mount Lemmon | Mount Lemmon Survey | · | 1.1 km | MPC · JPL |
| 674658 | 2015 RB_{94} | — | September 21, 2008 | Mount Lemmon | Mount Lemmon Survey | · | 560 m | MPC · JPL |
| 674659 | 2015 RC_{94} | — | January 7, 2010 | Kitt Peak | Spacewatch | · | 770 m | MPC · JPL |
| 674660 | 2015 RG_{95} | — | March 15, 2012 | Mount Lemmon | Mount Lemmon Survey | T_{j} (2.99) | 2.8 km | MPC · JPL |
| 674661 | 2015 RN_{95} | — | August 13, 2006 | Palomar | NEAT | · | 2.1 km | MPC · JPL |
| 674662 | 2015 RD_{97} | — | October 27, 2005 | Kitt Peak | Spacewatch | · | 610 m | MPC · JPL |
| 674663 | 2015 RZ_{97} | — | June 1, 2005 | Mount Lemmon | Mount Lemmon Survey | WIT | 1.1 km | MPC · JPL |
| 674664 | 2015 RP_{99} | — | October 28, 2005 | Kitt Peak | Spacewatch | · | 2.0 km | MPC · JPL |
| 674665 | 2015 RR_{99} | — | July 23, 2015 | Haleakala | Pan-STARRS 1 | · | 540 m | MPC · JPL |
| 674666 | 2015 RF_{100} | — | September 19, 2006 | Catalina | CSS | · | 1.9 km | MPC · JPL |
| 674667 | 2015 RK_{100} | — | May 23, 2014 | Haleakala | Pan-STARRS 1 | · | 2.3 km | MPC · JPL |
| 674668 | 2015 RW_{100} | — | August 22, 2006 | Palomar | NEAT | · | 1.9 km | MPC · JPL |
| 674669 | 2015 RX_{100} | — | July 25, 2015 | Haleakala | Pan-STARRS 1 | · | 840 m | MPC · JPL |
| 674670 | 2015 RE_{102} | — | August 27, 2015 | Črni Vrh | Matičič, S. | LIX | 3.4 km | MPC · JPL |
| 674671 | 2015 RF_{102} | — | August 28, 2015 | Haleakala | Pan-STARRS 1 | · | 850 m | MPC · JPL |
| 674672 | 2015 RR_{102} | — | October 7, 2008 | Mount Lemmon | Mount Lemmon Survey | · | 890 m | MPC · JPL |
| 674673 | 2015 RV_{102} | — | September 21, 2008 | Mount Lemmon | Mount Lemmon Survey | · | 860 m | MPC · JPL |
| 674674 | 2015 RX_{103} | — | October 22, 2012 | Haleakala | Pan-STARRS 1 | · | 620 m | MPC · JPL |
| 674675 | 2015 RO_{108} | — | September 11, 2015 | Haleakala | Pan-STARRS 1 | T_{j} (2.98) · EUP | 3.4 km | MPC · JPL |
| 674676 | 2015 RJ_{109} | — | November 1, 2010 | Piszkés-tető | K. Sárneczky, Z. Kuli | · | 2.0 km | MPC · JPL |
| 674677 | 2015 RT_{110} | — | March 11, 2003 | Kitt Peak | Spacewatch | · | 1.6 km | MPC · JPL |
| 674678 | 2015 RD_{111} | — | July 25, 2015 | Haleakala | Pan-STARRS 1 | · | 500 m | MPC · JPL |
| 674679 | 2015 RQ_{114} | — | July 30, 2015 | Haleakala | Pan-STARRS 1 | · | 2.2 km | MPC · JPL |
| 674680 | 2015 RS_{115} | — | November 25, 2005 | Mount Lemmon | Mount Lemmon Survey | · | 740 m | MPC · JPL |
| 674681 | 2015 RF_{116} | — | September 21, 2006 | Catalina | CSS | · | 1.6 km | MPC · JPL |
| 674682 | 2015 RV_{116} | — | November 5, 2010 | Mount Lemmon | Mount Lemmon Survey | · | 2.9 km | MPC · JPL |
| 674683 | 2015 RU_{118} | — | August 13, 2015 | Haleakala | Pan-STARRS 1 | THB | 2.2 km | MPC · JPL |
| 674684 | 2015 RG_{119} | — | October 1, 2005 | Catalina | CSS | · | 650 m | MPC · JPL |
| 674685 | 2015 RZ_{119} | — | January 11, 2008 | Kitt Peak | Spacewatch | · | 2.0 km | MPC · JPL |
| 674686 | 2015 RY_{120} | — | July 25, 2015 | Haleakala | Pan-STARRS 1 | THB | 2.3 km | MPC · JPL |
| 674687 | 2015 RT_{121} | — | November 20, 2008 | Kitt Peak | Spacewatch | NYS | 910 m | MPC · JPL |
| 674688 | 2015 RV_{123} | — | January 14, 2012 | Mount Lemmon | Mount Lemmon Survey | · | 2.0 km | MPC · JPL |
| 674689 | 2015 RU_{127} | — | September 17, 2010 | Mount Lemmon | Mount Lemmon Survey | · | 2.0 km | MPC · JPL |
| 674690 | 2015 RR_{132} | — | February 26, 2014 | Haleakala | Pan-STARRS 1 | · | 1.1 km | MPC · JPL |
| 674691 | 2015 RT_{135} | — | September 6, 2015 | Catalina | CSS | · | 580 m | MPC · JPL |
| 674692 | 2015 RM_{140} | — | November 9, 2010 | Mount Lemmon | Mount Lemmon Survey | · | 2.3 km | MPC · JPL |
| 674693 | 2015 RJ_{143} | — | April 19, 2009 | Kitt Peak | Spacewatch | · | 1.9 km | MPC · JPL |
| 674694 | 2015 RU_{147} | — | October 4, 2004 | Kitt Peak | Spacewatch | THM | 1.8 km | MPC · JPL |
| 674695 | 2015 RK_{157} | — | September 9, 2015 | Haleakala | Pan-STARRS 1 | · | 1.7 km | MPC · JPL |
| 674696 | 2015 RA_{164} | — | February 14, 2013 | Haleakala | Pan-STARRS 1 | · | 2.0 km | MPC · JPL |
| 674697 | 2015 RO_{168} | — | February 14, 2013 | Haleakala | Pan-STARRS 1 | · | 1.9 km | MPC · JPL |
| 674698 | 2015 RQ_{168} | — | March 12, 2002 | Palomar | NEAT | · | 2.3 km | MPC · JPL |
| 674699 | 2015 RK_{169} | — | July 25, 2015 | Haleakala | Pan-STARRS 1 | · | 1.9 km | MPC · JPL |
| 674700 | 2015 RA_{170} | — | July 25, 2015 | Haleakala | Pan-STARRS 1 | · | 2.6 km | MPC · JPL |

== 674701–674800 ==
back to top

| Designation | | | Discovery | | | Properties | | Ref |
| Permanent | Provisional | Named after | Date | Site | Discoverer(s) | Category | Diam. | Ref |
|---|---|---|---|---|---|---|---|---|
| 674701 | 2015 RX_{170} | — | December 29, 2011 | Mount Lemmon | Mount Lemmon Survey | VER | 2.3 km | MPC · JPL |
| 674702 | 2015 RP_{178} | — | April 1, 2014 | Mount Lemmon | Mount Lemmon Survey | · | 530 m | MPC · JPL |
| 674703 | 2015 RJ_{186} | — | April 20, 2014 | Mount Lemmon | Mount Lemmon Survey | · | 620 m | MPC · JPL |
| 674704 | 2015 RX_{187} | — | October 27, 2011 | Mount Lemmon | Mount Lemmon Survey | · | 3.2 km | MPC · JPL |
| 674705 | 2015 RW_{190} | — | September 11, 2015 | Haleakala | Pan-STARRS 1 | · | 1.5 km | MPC · JPL |
| 674706 | 2015 RP_{193} | — | August 23, 2001 | Kitt Peak | Spacewatch | · | 570 m | MPC · JPL |
| 674707 | 2015 RB_{194} | — | March 17, 2013 | Mount Lemmon | Mount Lemmon Survey | · | 1.1 km | MPC · JPL |
| 674708 | 2015 RE_{194} | — | April 29, 2014 | Haleakala | Pan-STARRS 1 | · | 1.0 km | MPC · JPL |
| 674709 | 2015 RN_{195} | — | September 11, 2015 | Haleakala | Pan-STARRS 1 | · | 790 m | MPC · JPL |
| 674710 | 2015 RW_{195} | — | March 16, 2010 | Mount Lemmon | Mount Lemmon Survey | · | 580 m | MPC · JPL |
| 674711 | 2015 RV_{204} | — | March 15, 2013 | Mount Lemmon | Mount Lemmon Survey | · | 3.0 km | MPC · JPL |
| 674712 | 2015 RE_{205} | — | August 12, 2015 | Haleakala | Pan-STARRS 1 | THB | 2.2 km | MPC · JPL |
| 674713 | 2015 RS_{205} | — | August 12, 2015 | Haleakala | Pan-STARRS 1 | · | 500 m | MPC · JPL |
| 674714 | 2015 RX_{205} | — | September 11, 2015 | Haleakala | Pan-STARRS 1 | · | 530 m | MPC · JPL |
| 674715 | 2015 RS_{206} | — | September 23, 2008 | Mount Lemmon | Mount Lemmon Survey | · | 760 m | MPC · JPL |
| 674716 | 2015 RY_{208} | — | February 27, 2012 | Haleakala | Pan-STARRS 1 | · | 2.8 km | MPC · JPL |
| 674717 | 2015 RA_{211} | — | January 2, 2012 | Mount Lemmon | Mount Lemmon Survey | EOS | 1.8 km | MPC · JPL |
| 674718 | 2015 RC_{212} | — | September 5, 2015 | Haleakala | Pan-STARRS 1 | VER | 2.2 km | MPC · JPL |
| 674719 | 2015 RO_{213} | — | October 11, 2010 | Mount Lemmon | Mount Lemmon Survey | EOS | 1.6 km | MPC · JPL |
| 674720 | 2015 RC_{214} | — | March 8, 2013 | Haleakala | Pan-STARRS 1 | · | 3.2 km | MPC · JPL |
| 674721 | 2015 RF_{214} | — | October 20, 2006 | Kitt Peak | Deep Ecliptic Survey | EOS | 1.8 km | MPC · JPL |
| 674722 | 2015 RL_{214} | — | May 30, 2015 | Haleakala | Pan-STARRS 1 | · | 2.9 km | MPC · JPL |
| 674723 | 2015 RW_{214} | — | September 10, 2015 | Haleakala | Pan-STARRS 1 | · | 2.8 km | MPC · JPL |
| 674724 | 2015 RP_{216} | — | February 14, 2007 | Mauna Kea | P. A. Wiegert | THM | 1.5 km | MPC · JPL |
| 674725 | 2015 RR_{217} | — | January 24, 2010 | Moletai | K. Černis, Zdanavicius, J. | (1338) (FLO) | 620 m | MPC · JPL |
| 674726 | 2015 RV_{227} | — | October 15, 2004 | Mount Lemmon | Mount Lemmon Survey | · | 3.1 km | MPC · JPL |
| 674727 | 2015 RO_{228} | — | September 11, 2015 | Haleakala | Pan-STARRS 1 | · | 2.3 km | MPC · JPL |
| 674728 | 2015 RF_{229} | — | October 2, 2008 | Mount Lemmon | Mount Lemmon Survey | · | 670 m | MPC · JPL |
| 674729 | 2015 RH_{233} | — | September 11, 2015 | Haleakala | Pan-STARRS 1 | EOS | 1.5 km | MPC · JPL |
| 674730 | 2015 RT_{233} | — | March 27, 2008 | Mount Lemmon | Mount Lemmon Survey | KOR | 1.3 km | MPC · JPL |
| 674731 | 2015 RU_{236} | — | September 11, 2015 | Haleakala | Pan-STARRS 1 | · | 930 m | MPC · JPL |
| 674732 | 2015 RV_{240} | — | May 26, 2014 | Haleakala | Pan-STARRS 1 | · | 1.1 km | MPC · JPL |
| 674733 | 2015 RX_{241} | — | September 18, 2004 | Socorro | LINEAR | · | 1.7 km | MPC · JPL |
| 674734 | 2015 RY_{242} | — | May 4, 2014 | Mount Lemmon | Mount Lemmon Survey | · | 710 m | MPC · JPL |
| 674735 | 2015 RK_{243} | — | December 24, 2006 | Kitt Peak | Spacewatch | EOS | 1.6 km | MPC · JPL |
| 674736 | 2015 RD_{246} | — | October 10, 2007 | Mount Lemmon | Mount Lemmon Survey | H | 350 m | MPC · JPL |
| 674737 | 2015 RM_{248} | — | August 19, 2009 | Kitt Peak | Spacewatch | · | 2.7 km | MPC · JPL |
| 674738 | 2015 RE_{249} | — | September 9, 2015 | Haleakala | Pan-STARRS 1 | (5) | 850 m | MPC · JPL |
| 674739 | 2015 RK_{250} | — | April 16, 2013 | Cerro Tololo-DECam | DECam | · | 2.4 km | MPC · JPL |
| 674740 | 2015 RW_{254} | — | September 9, 2015 | Haleakala | Pan-STARRS 1 | · | 850 m | MPC · JPL |
| 674741 | 2015 RZ_{254} | — | February 21, 2007 | Mount Lemmon | Mount Lemmon Survey | · | 2.2 km | MPC · JPL |
| 674742 | 2015 RH_{255} | — | April 22, 2002 | Palomar | NEAT | · | 2.7 km | MPC · JPL |
| 674743 | 2015 RE_{258} | — | December 3, 2008 | Mount Lemmon | Mount Lemmon Survey | · | 720 m | MPC · JPL |
| 674744 | 2015 RH_{259} | — | April 15, 2013 | Haleakala | Pan-STARRS 1 | · | 2.7 km | MPC · JPL |
| 674745 | 2015 RT_{259} | — | August 29, 2009 | Kitt Peak | Spacewatch | · | 3.0 km | MPC · JPL |
| 674746 | 2015 RN_{260} | — | January 21, 2012 | Mayhill-ISON | L. Elenin | · | 3.9 km | MPC · JPL |
| 674747 | 2015 RQ_{260} | — | February 8, 2008 | Mount Lemmon | Mount Lemmon Survey | · | 1.8 km | MPC · JPL |
| 674748 | 2015 RN_{262} | — | September 6, 2015 | Catalina | CSS | · | 2.0 km | MPC · JPL |
| 674749 | 2015 RS_{262} | — | April 27, 2009 | Kitt Peak | Spacewatch | · | 1.3 km | MPC · JPL |
| 674750 | 2015 RU_{268} | — | October 13, 2006 | Kitt Peak | Spacewatch | · | 1.3 km | MPC · JPL |
| 674751 | 2015 RB_{269} | — | July 27, 2014 | Haleakala | Pan-STARRS 1 | · | 3.0 km | MPC · JPL |
| 674752 | 2015 RW_{272} | — | January 2, 2012 | Mount Lemmon | Mount Lemmon Survey | · | 1.6 km | MPC · JPL |
| 674753 | 2015 RB_{273} | — | March 5, 2006 | Kitt Peak | Spacewatch | EUP | 2.5 km | MPC · JPL |
| 674754 | 2015 RY_{273} | — | September 12, 2015 | Haleakala | Pan-STARRS 1 | EOS | 1.5 km | MPC · JPL |
| 674755 | 2015 RD_{275} | — | September 12, 2015 | Haleakala | Pan-STARRS 1 | · | 910 m | MPC · JPL |
| 674756 | 2015 RG_{284} | — | September 9, 2015 | Haleakala | Pan-STARRS 1 | PHO | 730 m | MPC · JPL |
| 674757 | 2015 RM_{284} | — | September 9, 2015 | Haleakala | Pan-STARRS 1 | · | 770 m | MPC · JPL |
| 674758 | 2015 RT_{286} | — | September 9, 2015 | Haleakala | Pan-STARRS 1 | · | 580 m | MPC · JPL |
| 674759 | 2015 RW_{289} | — | September 9, 2015 | Haleakala | Pan-STARRS 1 | · | 2.2 km | MPC · JPL |
| 674760 | 2015 RH_{291} | — | September 9, 2015 | Haleakala | Pan-STARRS 1 | · | 520 m | MPC · JPL |
| 674761 | 2015 RQ_{295} | — | February 14, 2013 | Haleakala | Pan-STARRS 1 | · | 750 m | MPC · JPL |
| 674762 | 2015 RE_{302} | — | September 9, 2015 | Haleakala | Pan-STARRS 1 | · | 550 m | MPC · JPL |
| 674763 | 2015 RR_{306} | — | September 9, 2015 | Haleakala | Pan-STARRS 1 | · | 2.1 km | MPC · JPL |
| 674764 | 2015 RW_{308} | — | September 6, 2015 | Haleakala | Pan-STARRS 1 | · | 2.3 km | MPC · JPL |
| 674765 | 2015 RZ_{309} | — | September 6, 2015 | Kitt Peak | Spacewatch | · | 2.3 km | MPC · JPL |
| 674766 | 2015 RK_{313} | — | September 9, 2015 | Haleakala | Pan-STARRS 1 | NYS | 930 m | MPC · JPL |
| 674767 | 2015 RE_{314} | — | September 9, 2015 | Haleakala | Pan-STARRS 1 | NYS | 660 m | MPC · JPL |
| 674768 | 2015 RE_{329} | — | December 8, 2010 | Mayhill-ISON | L. Elenin | · | 1.8 km | MPC · JPL |
| 674769 | 2015 RE_{338} | — | September 9, 2015 | Haleakala | Pan-STARRS 1 | · | 560 m | MPC · JPL |
| 674770 | 2015 RA_{339} | — | September 8, 2015 | XuYi | PMO NEO Survey Program | · | 3.3 km | MPC · JPL |
| 674771 | 2015 RS_{341} | — | September 6, 2015 | Haleakala | Pan-STARRS 1 | · | 2.3 km | MPC · JPL |
| 674772 | 2015 RC_{346} | — | September 8, 2015 | Haleakala | Pan-STARRS 1 | · | 2.4 km | MPC · JPL |
| 674773 | 2015 RG_{350} | — | September 10, 2015 | Haleakala | Pan-STARRS 1 | · | 2.5 km | MPC · JPL |
| 674774 | 2015 RW_{361} | — | September 9, 2015 | Haleakala | Pan-STARRS 1 | MAS | 510 m | MPC · JPL |
| 674775 | 2015 SC_{1} | — | October 1, 2005 | Catalina | CSS | · | 640 m | MPC · JPL |
| 674776 | 2015 SS_{1} | — | August 21, 2015 | Haleakala | Pan-STARRS 1 | · | 2.6 km | MPC · JPL |
| 674777 | 2015 SJ_{5} | — | September 16, 2006 | Catalina | CSS | · | 2.3 km | MPC · JPL |
| 674778 | 2015 SX_{5} | — | September 18, 2015 | Catalina | CSS | · | 1.8 km | MPC · JPL |
| 674779 | 2015 SF_{6} | — | August 25, 2004 | Kitt Peak | Spacewatch | · | 2.2 km | MPC · JPL |
| 674780 | 2015 SG_{8} | — | October 28, 2010 | Mount Lemmon | Mount Lemmon Survey | · | 2.6 km | MPC · JPL |
| 674781 | 2015 SH_{8} | — | September 18, 2015 | Catalina | CSS | · | 3.2 km | MPC · JPL |
| 674782 | 2015 SP_{9} | — | September 22, 2015 | Haleakala | Pan-STARRS 1 | H | 410 m | MPC · JPL |
| 674783 | 2015 SJ_{10} | — | September 10, 2015 | Haleakala | Pan-STARRS 1 | · | 2.7 km | MPC · JPL |
| 674784 | 2015 SN_{10} | — | April 4, 2014 | Haleakala | Pan-STARRS 1 | · | 600 m | MPC · JPL |
| 674785 | 2015 SV_{14} | — | November 8, 2010 | Mount Lemmon | Mount Lemmon Survey | · | 2.6 km | MPC · JPL |
| 674786 | 2015 SU_{15} | — | September 23, 2015 | Mount Lemmon | Mount Lemmon Survey | · | 1.6 km | MPC · JPL |
| 674787 | 2015 SR_{16} | — | September 24, 2015 | Catalina | CSS | PHO | 530 m | MPC · JPL |
| 674788 | 2015 SL_{18} | — | July 29, 2005 | Palomar | NEAT | (16286) | 2.5 km | MPC · JPL |
| 674789 | 2015 SR_{18} | — | November 11, 2004 | Kitt Peak | Spacewatch | · | 890 m | MPC · JPL |
| 674790 | 2015 SX_{18} | — | March 27, 2011 | Mount Lemmon | Mount Lemmon Survey | · | 750 m | MPC · JPL |
| 674791 | 2015 SB_{20} | — | September 7, 2004 | Socorro | LINEAR | · | 1.0 km | MPC · JPL |
| 674792 | 2015 SG_{20} | — | July 19, 2015 | Haleakala | Pan-STARRS 1 | PHO | 890 m | MPC · JPL |
| 674793 | 2015 SR_{21} | — | September 19, 2015 | Haleakala | Pan-STARRS 1 | H | 290 m | MPC · JPL |
| 674794 | 2015 SH_{22} | — | September 23, 2015 | Haleakala | Pan-STARRS 1 | H | 340 m | MPC · JPL |
| 674795 | 2015 SP_{22} | — | September 23, 2015 | Haleakala | Pan-STARRS 1 | · | 3.2 km | MPC · JPL |
| 674796 | 2015 SA_{23} | — | September 2, 2010 | Mount Lemmon | Mount Lemmon Survey | · | 1.5 km | MPC · JPL |
| 674797 | 2015 SH_{25} | — | December 10, 2010 | Mount Lemmon | Mount Lemmon Survey | · | 2.3 km | MPC · JPL |
| 674798 | 2015 SM_{25} | — | October 26, 2009 | Mount Lemmon | Mount Lemmon Survey | · | 3.7 km | MPC · JPL |
| 674799 | 2015 SR_{25} | — | September 25, 2015 | Mount Lemmon | Mount Lemmon Survey | · | 2.5 km | MPC · JPL |
| 674800 | 2015 SU_{25} | — | September 19, 1998 | Apache Point | SDSS Collaboration | · | 3.3 km | MPC · JPL |

== 674801–674900 ==
back to top

| Designation | | | Discovery | | | Properties | | Ref |
| Permanent | Provisional | Named after | Date | Site | Discoverer(s) | Category | Diam. | Ref |
|---|---|---|---|---|---|---|---|---|
| 674801 | 2015 SM_{26} | — | October 1, 2009 | Mount Lemmon | Mount Lemmon Survey | URS | 2.9 km | MPC · JPL |
| 674802 | 2015 SP_{26} | — | September 20, 2015 | Mount Lemmon | Mount Lemmon Survey | · | 2.1 km | MPC · JPL |
| 674803 | 2015 ST_{26} | — | April 8, 2008 | Kitt Peak | Spacewatch | · | 2.3 km | MPC · JPL |
| 674804 | 2015 SE_{29} | — | September 23, 2015 | Haleakala | Pan-STARRS 1 | · | 990 m | MPC · JPL |
| 674805 | 2015 SS_{29} | — | November 20, 2004 | Kitt Peak | Spacewatch | LIX | 2.4 km | MPC · JPL |
| 674806 | 2015 SB_{30} | — | July 27, 2009 | Kitt Peak | Spacewatch | · | 1.7 km | MPC · JPL |
| 674807 | 2015 SM_{30} | — | November 13, 2010 | Mount Lemmon | Mount Lemmon Survey | · | 2.9 km | MPC · JPL |
| 674808 | 2015 SB_{31} | — | September 23, 2015 | Haleakala | Pan-STARRS 1 | PHO | 750 m | MPC · JPL |
| 674809 | 2015 SD_{31} | — | September 18, 2015 | Catalina | CSS | · | 1.4 km | MPC · JPL |
| 674810 | 2015 SQ_{31} | — | September 23, 2015 | Haleakala | Pan-STARRS 1 | H | 370 m | MPC · JPL |
| 674811 | 2015 SQ_{32} | — | September 18, 2015 | Catalina | CSS | · | 590 m | MPC · JPL |
| 674812 | 2015 SX_{32} | — | September 23, 2015 | Haleakala | Pan-STARRS 1 | · | 620 m | MPC · JPL |
| 674813 | 2015 SY_{33} | — | September 23, 2015 | ISON-SSO | L. Elenin | · | 3.7 km | MPC · JPL |
| 674814 | 2015 SS_{37} | — | September 23, 2015 | Haleakala | Pan-STARRS 1 | · | 960 m | MPC · JPL |
| 674815 | 2015 SP_{40} | — | September 18, 2015 | Mount Lemmon | Mount Lemmon Survey | · | 2.6 km | MPC · JPL |
| 674816 | 2015 SD_{55} | — | September 19, 2015 | Haleakala | Pan-STARRS 1 | PHO | 740 m | MPC · JPL |
| 674817 | 2015 SQ_{55} | — | September 25, 2015 | Mount Lemmon | Mount Lemmon Survey | · | 3.1 km | MPC · JPL |
| 674818 | 2015 TO | — | February 1, 1995 | Kitt Peak | Spacewatch | PHO | 2.1 km | MPC · JPL |
| 674819 | 2015 TJ_{2} | — | May 28, 2008 | Kitt Peak | Spacewatch | VER | 2.1 km | MPC · JPL |
| 674820 | 2015 TH_{4} | — | October 3, 2003 | Kitt Peak | Spacewatch | H | 290 m | MPC · JPL |
| 674821 | 2015 TX_{4} | — | February 13, 2008 | Kitt Peak | Spacewatch | · | 2.2 km | MPC · JPL |
| 674822 | 2015 TE_{7} | — | September 5, 2015 | ISON-SSO | L. Elenin | · | 2.5 km | MPC · JPL |
| 674823 | 2015 TX_{8} | — | July 19, 2015 | Haleakala | Pan-STARRS 1 | · | 2.8 km | MPC · JPL |
| 674824 | 2015 TL_{9} | — | September 7, 2004 | Palomar | NEAT | · | 2.2 km | MPC · JPL |
| 674825 | 2015 TE_{10} | — | September 26, 2005 | Kitt Peak | Spacewatch | · | 1.9 km | MPC · JPL |
| 674826 | 2015 TH_{11} | — | May 21, 2014 | Haleakala | Pan-STARRS 1 | VER | 2.3 km | MPC · JPL |
| 674827 | 2015 TP_{11} | — | July 25, 2015 | Haleakala | Pan-STARRS 1 | · | 2.5 km | MPC · JPL |
| 674828 | 2015 TB_{12} | — | September 18, 2010 | Mount Lemmon | Mount Lemmon Survey | VER | 2.5 km | MPC · JPL |
| 674829 | 2015 TL_{12} | — | October 19, 2006 | Mount Lemmon | Mount Lemmon Survey | · | 2.0 km | MPC · JPL |
| 674830 | 2015 TB_{13} | — | July 25, 2015 | Haleakala | Pan-STARRS 1 | · | 700 m | MPC · JPL |
| 674831 | 2015 TX_{13} | — | October 8, 2008 | Kitt Peak | Spacewatch | · | 730 m | MPC · JPL |
| 674832 | 2015 TZ_{13} | — | October 25, 2005 | Kitt Peak | Spacewatch | · | 1.7 km | MPC · JPL |
| 674833 | 2015 TG_{14} | — | March 20, 2012 | Haleakala | Pan-STARRS 1 | · | 2.5 km | MPC · JPL |
| 674834 | 2015 TD_{15} | — | December 5, 2010 | Mount Lemmon | Mount Lemmon Survey | · | 2.9 km | MPC · JPL |
| 674835 | 2015 TJ_{15} | — | December 3, 2005 | Kitt Peak | Spacewatch | · | 2.7 km | MPC · JPL |
| 674836 | 2015 TU_{15} | — | January 27, 2007 | Kitt Peak | Spacewatch | · | 600 m | MPC · JPL |
| 674837 | 2015 TB_{17} | — | October 2, 2015 | Haleakala | Pan-STARRS 1 | · | 2.3 km | MPC · JPL |
| 674838 | 2015 TH_{17} | — | May 3, 2008 | Mount Lemmon | Mount Lemmon Survey | URS | 3.0 km | MPC · JPL |
| 674839 | 2015 TO_{17} | — | October 2, 2015 | Haleakala | Pan-STARRS 1 | ELF | 2.7 km | MPC · JPL |
| 674840 | 2015 TF_{19} | — | September 3, 2010 | Mount Lemmon | Mount Lemmon Survey | EOS | 1.9 km | MPC · JPL |
| 674841 | 2015 TR_{19} | — | October 12, 2010 | Mount Lemmon | Mount Lemmon Survey | · | 1.3 km | MPC · JPL |
| 674842 | 2015 TG_{20} | — | November 8, 2010 | Mount Lemmon | Mount Lemmon Survey | EOS | 1.8 km | MPC · JPL |
| 674843 | 2015 TY_{21} | — | May 7, 2014 | Haleakala | Pan-STARRS 1 | · | 2.5 km | MPC · JPL |
| 674844 | 2015 TG_{22} | — | September 26, 2011 | Kitt Peak | Spacewatch | · | 610 m | MPC · JPL |
| 674845 | 2015 TG_{25} | — | September 30, 2006 | Mount Lemmon | Mount Lemmon Survey | · | 2.4 km | MPC · JPL |
| 674846 | 2015 TW_{25} | — | January 30, 2012 | Mount Lemmon | Mount Lemmon Survey | · | 3.1 km | MPC · JPL |
| 674847 | 2015 TX_{26} | — | September 26, 2000 | Kitt Peak | Spacewatch | · | 970 m | MPC · JPL |
| 674848 | 2015 TH_{27} | — | August 30, 2009 | La Sagra | OAM | · | 3.8 km | MPC · JPL |
| 674849 | 2015 TK_{27} | — | October 8, 2008 | Mount Lemmon | Mount Lemmon Survey | · | 700 m | MPC · JPL |
| 674850 | 2015 TW_{28} | — | October 17, 2010 | Mount Lemmon | Mount Lemmon Survey | · | 2.5 km | MPC · JPL |
| 674851 | 2015 TZ_{31} | — | March 11, 2007 | Mount Lemmon | Mount Lemmon Survey | · | 2.4 km | MPC · JPL |
| 674852 | 2015 TB_{34} | — | October 17, 2010 | Mount Lemmon | Mount Lemmon Survey | · | 2.6 km | MPC · JPL |
| 674853 | 2015 TT_{34} | — | August 21, 2015 | Haleakala | Pan-STARRS 1 | · | 2.8 km | MPC · JPL |
| 674854 | 2015 TC_{35} | — | February 1, 2012 | Mount Lemmon | Mount Lemmon Survey | · | 3.0 km | MPC · JPL |
| 674855 | 2015 TN_{35} | — | October 5, 2015 | Haleakala | Pan-STARRS 1 | · | 2.1 km | MPC · JPL |
| 674856 | 2015 TT_{35} | — | November 12, 2010 | Mount Lemmon | Mount Lemmon Survey | · | 2.5 km | MPC · JPL |
| 674857 | 2015 TU_{39} | — | October 5, 2015 | Haleakala | Pan-STARRS 1 | · | 2.6 km | MPC · JPL |
| 674858 | 2015 TJ_{42} | — | October 5, 2015 | Haleakala | Pan-STARRS 1 | EOS | 1.7 km | MPC · JPL |
| 674859 | 2015 TR_{42} | — | May 21, 2014 | Haleakala | Pan-STARRS 1 | · | 1.4 km | MPC · JPL |
| 674860 | 2015 TF_{43} | — | October 17, 1995 | Kitt Peak | Spacewatch | EOS | 2.0 km | MPC · JPL |
| 674861 | 2015 TF_{47} | — | April 5, 2014 | Haleakala | Pan-STARRS 1 | · | 1.3 km | MPC · JPL |
| 674862 | 2015 TQ_{47} | — | September 11, 2015 | Haleakala | Pan-STARRS 1 | · | 590 m | MPC · JPL |
| 674863 | 2015 TR_{48} | — | July 25, 2015 | Haleakala | Pan-STARRS 1 | · | 2.4 km | MPC · JPL |
| 674864 | 2015 TE_{49} | — | February 6, 2014 | Mount Lemmon | Mount Lemmon Survey | · | 610 m | MPC · JPL |
| 674865 | 2015 TB_{51} | — | January 18, 2012 | Kitt Peak | Spacewatch | · | 2.7 km | MPC · JPL |
| 674866 | 2015 TH_{51} | — | March 6, 2013 | Haleakala | Pan-STARRS 1 | · | 1.9 km | MPC · JPL |
| 674867 | 2015 TP_{52} | — | December 25, 2005 | Mount Lemmon | Mount Lemmon Survey | · | 3.2 km | MPC · JPL |
| 674868 | 2015 TU_{53} | — | September 23, 2015 | Mount Lemmon | Mount Lemmon Survey | · | 3.4 km | MPC · JPL |
| 674869 | 2015 TT_{55} | — | July 28, 2009 | Kitt Peak | Spacewatch | · | 3.0 km | MPC · JPL |
| 674870 | 2015 TP_{57} | — | March 18, 2004 | Apache Point | SDSS Collaboration | · | 2.3 km | MPC · JPL |
| 674871 | 2015 TX_{57} | — | January 30, 2012 | Mount Lemmon | Mount Lemmon Survey | · | 2.8 km | MPC · JPL |
| 674872 | 2015 TE_{62} | — | January 10, 2007 | Mount Lemmon | Mount Lemmon Survey | EOS | 1.8 km | MPC · JPL |
| 674873 | 2015 TW_{63} | — | December 30, 2008 | XuYi | PMO NEO Survey Program | · | 830 m | MPC · JPL |
| 674874 | 2015 TJ_{64} | — | December 29, 2008 | Mount Lemmon | Mount Lemmon Survey | NYS | 790 m | MPC · JPL |
| 674875 | 2015 TS_{65} | — | July 4, 2014 | Haleakala | Pan-STARRS 1 | · | 1.6 km | MPC · JPL |
| 674876 | 2015 TU_{65} | — | October 24, 2011 | Haleakala | Pan-STARRS 1 | · | 860 m | MPC · JPL |
| 674877 | 2015 TV_{65} | — | October 7, 2004 | Anderson Mesa | LONEOS | · | 2.8 km | MPC · JPL |
| 674878 | 2015 TK_{67} | — | March 16, 2013 | Mount Lemmon | Mount Lemmon Survey | EUN | 1.1 km | MPC · JPL |
| 674879 | 2015 TR_{67} | — | April 16, 2013 | Haleakala | Pan-STARRS 1 | · | 3.4 km | MPC · JPL |
| 674880 | 2015 TG_{68} | — | August 25, 2004 | Kitt Peak | Spacewatch | V | 670 m | MPC · JPL |
| 674881 | 2015 TP_{69} | — | September 23, 1998 | Kitt Peak | Spacewatch | · | 2.5 km | MPC · JPL |
| 674882 | 2015 TT_{69} | — | October 29, 2008 | Kitt Peak | Spacewatch | · | 830 m | MPC · JPL |
| 674883 | 2015 TF_{71} | — | October 25, 2011 | Haleakala | Pan-STARRS 1 | · | 830 m | MPC · JPL |
| 674884 | 2015 TU_{72} | — | October 7, 2010 | Kitt Peak | Spacewatch | · | 1.7 km | MPC · JPL |
| 674885 | 2015 TB_{73} | — | September 26, 2011 | Mount Lemmon | Mount Lemmon Survey | · | 1.0 km | MPC · JPL |
| 674886 | 2015 TX_{75} | — | October 8, 2015 | Mount Lemmon | Mount Lemmon Survey | · | 630 m | MPC · JPL |
| 674887 | 2015 TH_{77} | — | October 8, 2015 | Mount Lemmon | Mount Lemmon Survey | · | 1.1 km | MPC · JPL |
| 674888 | 2015 TK_{78} | — | March 4, 2002 | Cima Ekar | ADAS | MAS | 720 m | MPC · JPL |
| 674889 | 2015 TO_{79} | — | October 8, 2015 | Haleakala | Pan-STARRS 1 | H | 440 m | MPC · JPL |
| 674890 | 2015 TY_{79} | — | July 4, 2014 | Haleakala | Pan-STARRS 1 | · | 2.3 km | MPC · JPL |
| 674891 | 2015 TW_{80} | — | September 20, 2011 | Catalina | CSS | · | 870 m | MPC · JPL |
| 674892 | 2015 TF_{81} | — | November 13, 2010 | Kitt Peak | Spacewatch | EOS | 1.8 km | MPC · JPL |
| 674893 | 2015 TH_{81} | — | September 9, 2015 | Haleakala | Pan-STARRS 1 | · | 480 m | MPC · JPL |
| 674894 | 2015 TT_{82} | — | November 8, 2007 | Kitt Peak | Spacewatch | · | 770 m | MPC · JPL |
| 674895 | 2015 TV_{82} | — | October 31, 2008 | Kitt Peak | Spacewatch | · | 480 m | MPC · JPL |
| 674896 | 2015 TV_{83} | — | November 1, 2008 | Mount Lemmon | Mount Lemmon Survey | V | 490 m | MPC · JPL |
| 674897 | 2015 TO_{84} | — | October 8, 2015 | Haleakala | Pan-STARRS 1 | · | 3.2 km | MPC · JPL |
| 674898 | 2015 TJ_{85} | — | November 20, 2001 | Socorro | LINEAR | DOR | 1.8 km | MPC · JPL |
| 674899 | 2015 TX_{85} | — | October 8, 2015 | Haleakala | Pan-STARRS 1 | · | 690 m | MPC · JPL |
| 674900 | 2015 TX_{86} | — | November 28, 2011 | Kitt Peak | Spacewatch | · | 1.2 km | MPC · JPL |

== 674901–675000 ==
back to top

| Designation | | | Discovery | | | Properties | | Ref |
| Permanent | Provisional | Named after | Date | Site | Discoverer(s) | Category | Diam. | Ref |
|---|---|---|---|---|---|---|---|---|
| 674901 | 2015 TN_{87} | — | April 13, 2013 | Haleakala | Pan-STARRS 1 | · | 2.7 km | MPC · JPL |
| 674902 | 2015 TJ_{88} | — | April 14, 2002 | Palomar | NEAT | · | 2.9 km | MPC · JPL |
| 674903 | 2015 TP_{88} | — | October 10, 2004 | Kitt Peak | Spacewatch | · | 890 m | MPC · JPL |
| 674904 | 2015 TG_{89} | — | June 6, 2014 | Haleakala | Pan-STARRS 1 | · | 2.9 km | MPC · JPL |
| 674905 | 2015 TJ_{89} | — | September 9, 2015 | Haleakala | Pan-STARRS 1 | · | 780 m | MPC · JPL |
| 674906 | 2015 TX_{90} | — | October 6, 2004 | Kitt Peak | Spacewatch | EOS | 1.7 km | MPC · JPL |
| 674907 | 2015 TE_{98} | — | August 31, 2011 | Haleakala | Pan-STARRS 1 | · | 1.1 km | MPC · JPL |
| 674908 | 2015 TS_{100} | — | October 8, 2015 | Haleakala | Pan-STARRS 1 | · | 2.1 km | MPC · JPL |
| 674909 | 2015 TA_{101} | — | November 12, 2010 | Mount Lemmon | Mount Lemmon Survey | EOS | 1.3 km | MPC · JPL |
| 674910 | 2015 TS_{101} | — | March 12, 2010 | Kitt Peak | Spacewatch | V | 490 m | MPC · JPL |
| 674911 | 2015 TW_{103} | — | May 29, 2008 | Mount Lemmon | Mount Lemmon Survey | · | 2.3 km | MPC · JPL |
| 674912 | 2015 TD_{104} | — | May 26, 2014 | Haleakala | Pan-STARRS 1 | · | 1.1 km | MPC · JPL |
| 674913 | 2015 TG_{104} | — | January 7, 2006 | Mount Lemmon | Mount Lemmon Survey | · | 2.4 km | MPC · JPL |
| 674914 | 2015 TK_{104} | — | October 13, 2001 | Kitt Peak | Spacewatch | · | 1.4 km | MPC · JPL |
| 674915 | 2015 TK_{106} | — | May 24, 2014 | Mount Lemmon | Mount Lemmon Survey | · | 1.0 km | MPC · JPL |
| 674916 | 2015 TY_{106} | — | September 26, 2011 | Haleakala | Pan-STARRS 1 | · | 900 m | MPC · JPL |
| 674917 | 2015 TO_{109} | — | February 5, 2009 | Kitt Peak | Spacewatch | · | 810 m | MPC · JPL |
| 674918 | 2015 TD_{110} | — | January 6, 2012 | Haleakala | Pan-STARRS 1 | · | 3.6 km | MPC · JPL |
| 674919 | 2015 TJ_{110} | — | October 8, 2015 | Haleakala | Pan-STARRS 1 | · | 640 m | MPC · JPL |
| 674920 | 2015 TC_{112} | — | September 18, 2009 | Kitt Peak | Spacewatch | · | 2.3 km | MPC · JPL |
| 674921 | 2015 TE_{112} | — | October 8, 2015 | Haleakala | Pan-STARRS 1 | · | 1.3 km | MPC · JPL |
| 674922 | 2015 TH_{112} | — | September 30, 2011 | Kitt Peak | Spacewatch | V | 440 m | MPC · JPL |
| 674923 | 2015 TP_{112} | — | August 24, 2011 | Haleakala | Pan-STARRS 1 | ERI | 1.1 km | MPC · JPL |
| 674924 | 2015 TC_{114} | — | October 8, 2015 | Haleakala | Pan-STARRS 1 | · | 810 m | MPC · JPL |
| 674925 | 2015 TL_{114} | — | October 8, 2015 | Haleakala | Pan-STARRS 1 | · | 990 m | MPC · JPL |
| 674926 | 2015 TA_{117} | — | December 21, 2005 | Catalina | CSS | · | 2.3 km | MPC · JPL |
| 674927 | 2015 TH_{119} | — | January 31, 2006 | Kitt Peak | Spacewatch | · | 3.2 km | MPC · JPL |
| 674928 | 2015 TO_{122} | — | December 2, 2010 | Catalina | CSS | · | 1.8 km | MPC · JPL |
| 674929 | 2015 TJ_{127} | — | December 25, 2011 | Marly | P. Kocher | · | 1.7 km | MPC · JPL |
| 674930 | 2015 TK_{127} | — | November 11, 2010 | Kitt Peak | Spacewatch | H | 340 m | MPC · JPL |
| 674931 | 2015 TG_{128} | — | July 7, 2005 | Mauna Kea | Veillet, C. | · | 2.0 km | MPC · JPL |
| 674932 | 2015 TW_{128} | — | August 29, 2009 | Kitt Peak | Spacewatch | EOS | 1.8 km | MPC · JPL |
| 674933 | 2015 TX_{128} | — | October 8, 2015 | Haleakala | Pan-STARRS 1 | · | 1.4 km | MPC · JPL |
| 674934 | 2015 TA_{129} | — | October 8, 2015 | Haleakala | Pan-STARRS 1 | · | 910 m | MPC · JPL |
| 674935 | 2015 TZ_{129} | — | April 17, 2013 | Haleakala | Pan-STARRS 1 | · | 2.2 km | MPC · JPL |
| 674936 | 2015 TS_{131} | — | May 7, 2011 | Mayhill-ISON | L. Elenin | · | 780 m | MPC · JPL |
| 674937 | 2015 TJ_{133} | — | December 6, 2010 | Mount Lemmon | Mount Lemmon Survey | · | 3.3 km | MPC · JPL |
| 674938 | 2015 TO_{137} | — | December 13, 2010 | Mount Lemmon | Mount Lemmon Survey | EOS | 1.8 km | MPC · JPL |
| 674939 | 2015 TS_{140} | — | September 12, 2015 | Haleakala | Pan-STARRS 1 | · | 900 m | MPC · JPL |
| 674940 | 2015 TD_{142} | — | February 25, 2012 | Mayhill-ISON | L. Elenin | · | 2.7 km | MPC · JPL |
| 674941 | 2015 TG_{142} | — | May 10, 2013 | Haleakala | Pan-STARRS 1 | VER | 2.3 km | MPC · JPL |
| 674942 | 2015 TX_{143} | — | October 8, 2015 | Haleakala | Pan-STARRS 1 | APO | 400 m | MPC · JPL |
| 674943 | 2015 TT_{144} | — | October 7, 2015 | WISE | WISE | · | 3.1 km | MPC · JPL |
| 674944 | 2015 TS_{145} | — | October 5, 2004 | Kitt Peak | Spacewatch | · | 2.5 km | MPC · JPL |
| 674945 | 2015 TF_{147} | — | November 18, 2008 | Catalina | CSS | · | 760 m | MPC · JPL |
| 674946 | 2015 TH_{147} | — | October 8, 2015 | ESA OGS | ESA OGS | · | 810 m | MPC · JPL |
| 674947 | 2015 TJ_{150} | — | September 10, 2015 | Haleakala | Pan-STARRS 1 | · | 2.5 km | MPC · JPL |
| 674948 | 2015 TN_{151} | — | September 11, 2015 | Haleakala | Pan-STARRS 1 | · | 2.4 km | MPC · JPL |
| 674949 | 2015 TV_{152} | — | October 11, 2006 | Kitt Peak | Spacewatch | · | 1.3 km | MPC · JPL |
| 674950 | 2015 TP_{153} | — | October 8, 2007 | Mount Lemmon | Mount Lemmon Survey | · | 940 m | MPC · JPL |
| 674951 | 2015 TA_{159} | — | August 27, 2005 | Palomar | NEAT | · | 580 m | MPC · JPL |
| 674952 | 2015 TL_{160} | — | March 9, 2008 | Kitt Peak | Spacewatch | · | 2.1 km | MPC · JPL |
| 674953 | 2015 TY_{160} | — | April 26, 2008 | Kitt Peak | Spacewatch | · | 2.7 km | MPC · JPL |
| 674954 | 2015 TP_{162} | — | August 26, 2005 | Palomar | NEAT | EOS | 1.5 km | MPC · JPL |
| 674955 | 2015 TC_{163} | — | July 1, 2011 | Kitt Peak | Spacewatch | · | 1.3 km | MPC · JPL |
| 674956 | 2015 TG_{163} | — | October 24, 2005 | Mauna Kea | A. Boattini | · | 1.3 km | MPC · JPL |
| 674957 | 2015 TL_{163} | — | February 26, 2008 | Mount Lemmon | Mount Lemmon Survey | · | 2.4 km | MPC · JPL |
| 674958 | 2015 TR_{167} | — | October 2, 2015 | Kitt Peak | Spacewatch | · | 990 m | MPC · JPL |
| 674959 | 2015 TW_{169} | — | April 30, 2014 | Haleakala | Pan-STARRS 1 | · | 1.3 km | MPC · JPL |
| 674960 | 2015 TH_{171} | — | October 22, 2005 | Kitt Peak | Spacewatch | · | 590 m | MPC · JPL |
| 674961 | 2015 TU_{171} | — | March 30, 2008 | Kitt Peak | Spacewatch | · | 2.2 km | MPC · JPL |
| 674962 | 2015 TE_{172} | — | October 9, 2015 | Haleakala | Pan-STARRS 1 | · | 810 m | MPC · JPL |
| 674963 | 2015 TF_{172} | — | May 20, 1996 | Kitt Peak | Spacewatch | · | 2.6 km | MPC · JPL |
| 674964 | 2015 TZ_{173} | — | October 9, 2015 | Haleakala | Pan-STARRS 1 | · | 630 m | MPC · JPL |
| 674965 | 2015 TF_{174} | — | December 29, 2005 | Mount Lemmon | Mount Lemmon Survey | V | 430 m | MPC · JPL |
| 674966 | 2015 TV_{179} | — | September 21, 2011 | Mount Lemmon | Mount Lemmon Survey | · | 860 m | MPC · JPL |
| 674967 | 2015 TX_{179} | — | December 25, 2010 | Mount Lemmon | Mount Lemmon Survey | · | 2.7 km | MPC · JPL |
| 674968 | 2015 TK_{180} | — | December 25, 2008 | La Sagra | OAM | NYS | 1.0 km | MPC · JPL |
| 674969 | 2015 TX_{180} | — | July 23, 2015 | Haleakala | Pan-STARRS 2 | · | 1.8 km | MPC · JPL |
| 674970 | 2015 TM_{182} | — | October 6, 2008 | Mount Lemmon | Mount Lemmon Survey | · | 730 m | MPC · JPL |
| 674971 | 2015 TQ_{182} | — | August 21, 2015 | Haleakala | Pan-STARRS 1 | · | 950 m | MPC · JPL |
| 674972 | 2015 TN_{183} | — | April 19, 2013 | Haleakala | Pan-STARRS 1 | ELF | 3.2 km | MPC · JPL |
| 674973 | 2015 TS_{183} | — | September 12, 2015 | Haleakala | Pan-STARRS 1 | LIX | 3.2 km | MPC · JPL |
| 674974 | 2015 TC_{190} | — | December 14, 2010 | Mount Lemmon | Mount Lemmon Survey | · | 3.7 km | MPC · JPL |
| 674975 | 2015 TK_{190} | — | April 3, 2011 | Haleakala | Pan-STARRS 1 | · | 640 m | MPC · JPL |
| 674976 | 2015 TP_{190} | — | January 19, 2013 | Mount Lemmon | Mount Lemmon Survey | · | 770 m | MPC · JPL |
| 674977 | 2015 TU_{191} | — | September 18, 2015 | Mount Lemmon | Mount Lemmon Survey | · | 2.8 km | MPC · JPL |
| 674978 | 2015 TK_{195} | — | September 24, 2015 | Catalina | CSS | · | 920 m | MPC · JPL |
| 674979 | 2015 TM_{195} | — | November 4, 2004 | Kitt Peak | Spacewatch | · | 900 m | MPC · JPL |
| 674980 | 2015 TH_{196} | — | September 6, 2015 | Haleakala | Pan-STARRS 1 | (69559) | 2.5 km | MPC · JPL |
| 674981 | 2015 TL_{196} | — | October 10, 2015 | Space Surveillance | Space Surveillance Telescope | AGN | 1.2 km | MPC · JPL |
| 674982 | 2015 TL_{197} | — | August 28, 2015 | Haleakala | Pan-STARRS 1 | · | 770 m | MPC · JPL |
| 674983 | 2015 TM_{198} | — | September 23, 2015 | Haleakala | Pan-STARRS 1 | T_{j} (2.96) | 2.9 km | MPC · JPL |
| 674984 | 2015 TP_{198} | — | August 12, 2015 | Haleakala | Pan-STARRS 1 | · | 840 m | MPC · JPL |
| 674985 | 2015 TU_{198} | — | August 12, 2015 | Haleakala | Pan-STARRS 1 | NYS | 750 m | MPC · JPL |
| 674986 | 2015 TA_{203} | — | October 10, 2015 | Catalina | CSS | · | 2.4 km | MPC · JPL |
| 674987 | 2015 TE_{203} | — | September 11, 2004 | Kitt Peak | Spacewatch | NYS | 830 m | MPC · JPL |
| 674988 | 2015 TG_{203} | — | March 7, 2013 | Mount Lemmon | Mount Lemmon Survey | · | 1.7 km | MPC · JPL |
| 674989 | 2015 TZ_{203} | — | September 9, 2015 | Haleakala | Pan-STARRS 1 | · | 2.7 km | MPC · JPL |
| 674990 | 2015 TJ_{204} | — | September 9, 2015 | Haleakala | Pan-STARRS 1 | · | 1.2 km | MPC · JPL |
| 674991 | 2015 TW_{204} | — | October 7, 2001 | Palomar | NEAT | AGN | 1.3 km | MPC · JPL |
| 674992 | 2015 TT_{205} | — | August 21, 2008 | Kitt Peak | Spacewatch | · | 700 m | MPC · JPL |
| 674993 | 2015 TW_{206} | — | March 3, 2013 | Kitt Peak | Spacewatch | · | 2.4 km | MPC · JPL |
| 674994 | 2015 TT_{208} | — | October 9, 2004 | Kitt Peak | Spacewatch | · | 850 m | MPC · JPL |
| 674995 | 2015 TY_{208} | — | August 17, 2009 | Catalina | CSS | · | 3.8 km | MPC · JPL |
| 674996 | 2015 TZ_{208} | — | February 8, 2013 | Kitt Peak | Spacewatch | BRG | 1.4 km | MPC · JPL |
| 674997 | 2015 TT_{209} | — | January 1, 2008 | Mount Lemmon | Mount Lemmon Survey | · | 1.2 km | MPC · JPL |
| 674998 | 2015 TE_{210} | — | July 28, 2011 | Haleakala | Pan-STARRS 1 | · | 840 m | MPC · JPL |
| 674999 | 2015 TZ_{210} | — | April 3, 2011 | Haleakala | Pan-STARRS 1 | · | 700 m | MPC · JPL |
| 675000 | 2015 TB_{211} | — | April 30, 2005 | Kitt Peak | Spacewatch | · | 430 m | MPC · JPL |

back to top
