= Diamond-like carbon =

Class of amorphous carbon material

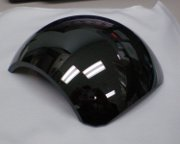
Dome coated with DLC for optical and tribological purposes.

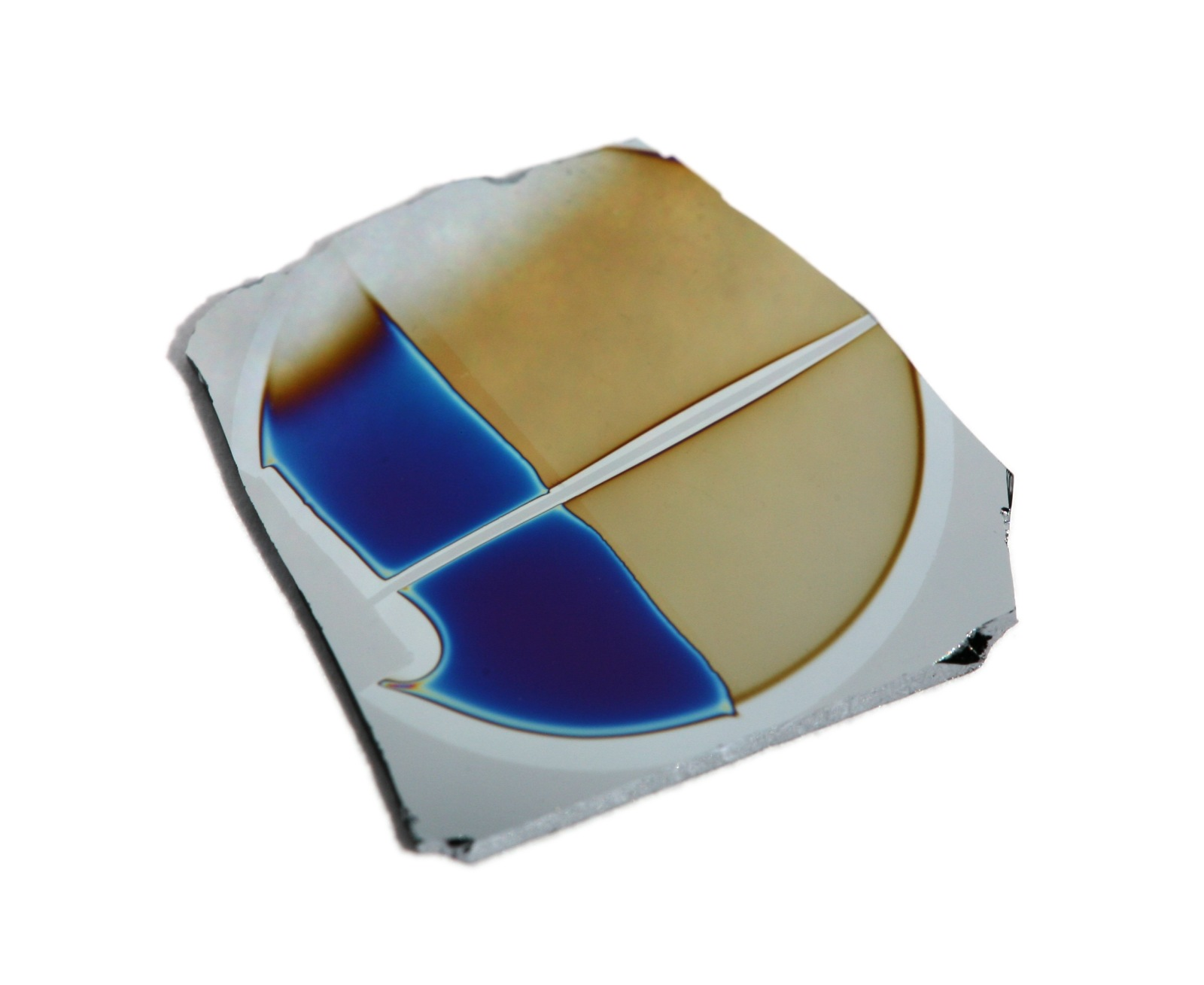
A ta-C thin film on silicon (15 mm diameter) exhibiting regions of 40 nm and 80 nm thickness.

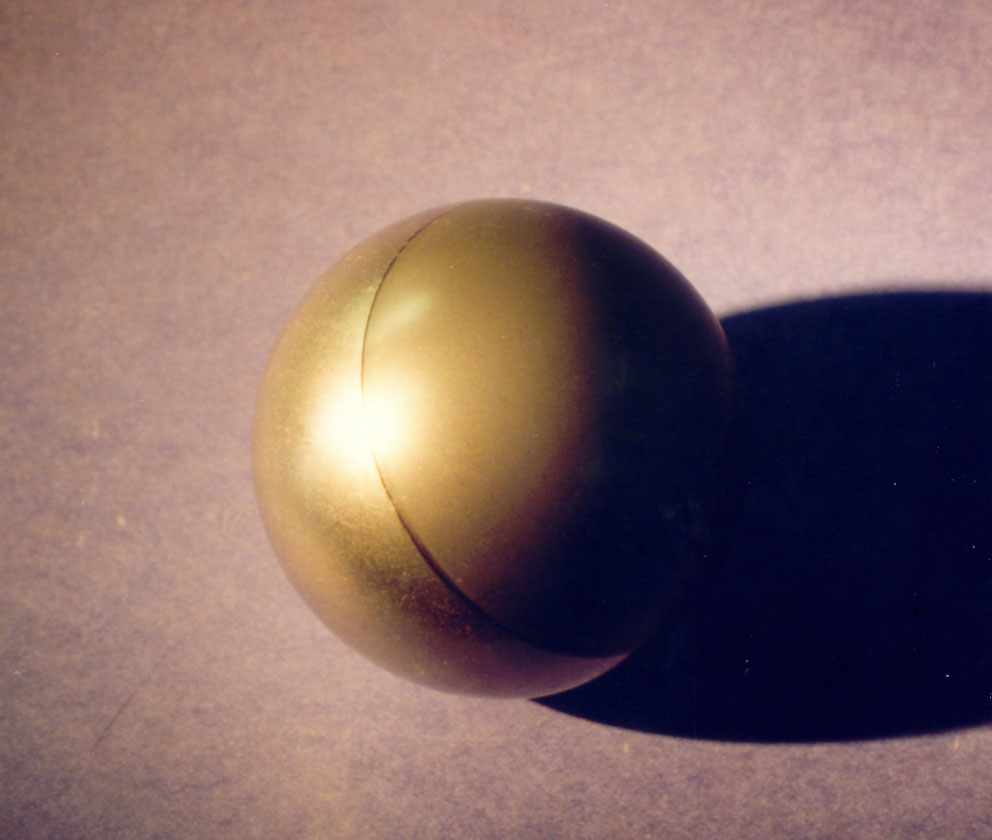
A Co-alloy valve part from a producing oil well (30 mm diameter), coated on the right side with ta-C, in order to test for added resistance to chemical and abrasive degradation in the working environment.

Diamond-like carbon (DLC) is a class of amorphous carbon materials that display some of the typical properties of diamond. DLC is usually applied as coatings to other materials that could benefit from such properties.

DLC exists in seven different forms. All seven contain significant amounts of sp^{3} hybridized carbon atoms. The reason that there are different types is that even diamond can be found in two crystalline polytypes. The more common one uses a cubic lattice, while the less common one, lonsdaleite, has a hexagonal lattice. By mixing these polytypes at the nanoscale, DLC coatings can be made that at the same time are amorphous, flexible, and yet purely sp^{3} bonded "diamond". The hardest, strongest, and slickest is tetrahedral amorphous carbon (ta-C). Ta-C can be considered to be the "pure" form of DLC, since it consists almost entirely of sp^{3} bonded carbon atoms. Other materials notably hydrogen and graphitic sp^{2} carbon are present in the other 6 forms usually as a result of the specific production process. The various forms can also be doped with elements such as silicon to impart other desirable properties.

The various forms of DLC can be applied to almost any material that is compatible with a vacuum environment.

== History ==
S. Aisenberg and R. Chabot are widely recognized as pioneers in the field of diamond-like carbon (DLC) research. In a seminal 1971 paper published in the Journal of Applied Physics, they detailed a novel ion-beam deposition technique used to create amorphous carbon films with properties remarkably similar to natural diamond.

In 2006, the market for outsourced DLC coatings was estimated as about €30,000,000 in the European Union.

In 2011, researchers at Stanford University announced a super-hard amorphous diamond under conditions of ultrahigh pressure. The diamond lacks the crystalline structure of diamond but has the light weight characteristic of carbon.

In 2021, Chinese researchers announced AM-III, a super-hard, fullerene-based form of amorphous carbon. It is also a semi-conductor with a bandgap range of 1.5 to 2.2 eV. The material demonstrated a hardness of 113 GPa on a Vickers hardness test vs diamonds rate at around 70 to 100 GPa. It was hard enough to scratch the surface of a diamond.

== Distinction from natural and synthetic diamond ==
Naturally occurring diamond is almost always found in the crystalline form with a purely cubic orientation of sp^{3} bonded carbon atoms. Sometimes there are lattice defects or inclusions of atoms of other elements that give color to the stone, but the lattice arrangement of the carbons remains cubic and bonding is purely sp^{3}. The internal energy of the cubic polytype is slightly lower than that of the hexagonal form and growth rates from molten material in both natural and bulk synthetic diamond production methods are slow enough that the lattice structure has time to grow in the lowest energy (cubic) form that is possible for sp^{3} bonding of carbon atoms. In contrast, DLC is typically produced by processes in which high energy precursive carbons (e.g. in plasmas, in filtered cathodic arc deposition, in sputter deposition and in ion beam deposition) are rapidly cooled or quenched on relatively cold surfaces. In those cases cubic and hexagonal lattices can be randomly intermixed, layer by atomic layer, because there is no time available for one of the crystalline geometries to grow at the expense of the other before the atoms are "frozen" in place in the material. Amorphous DLC coatings can result in materials that have no long-range crystalline order. Without long range order there are no brittle fracture planes, so such coatings are flexible and conformal to the underlying shape being coated, while still being as hard as diamond. In fact this property has been exploited to study atom-by-atom wear at the nanoscale in DLC.

== Production ==
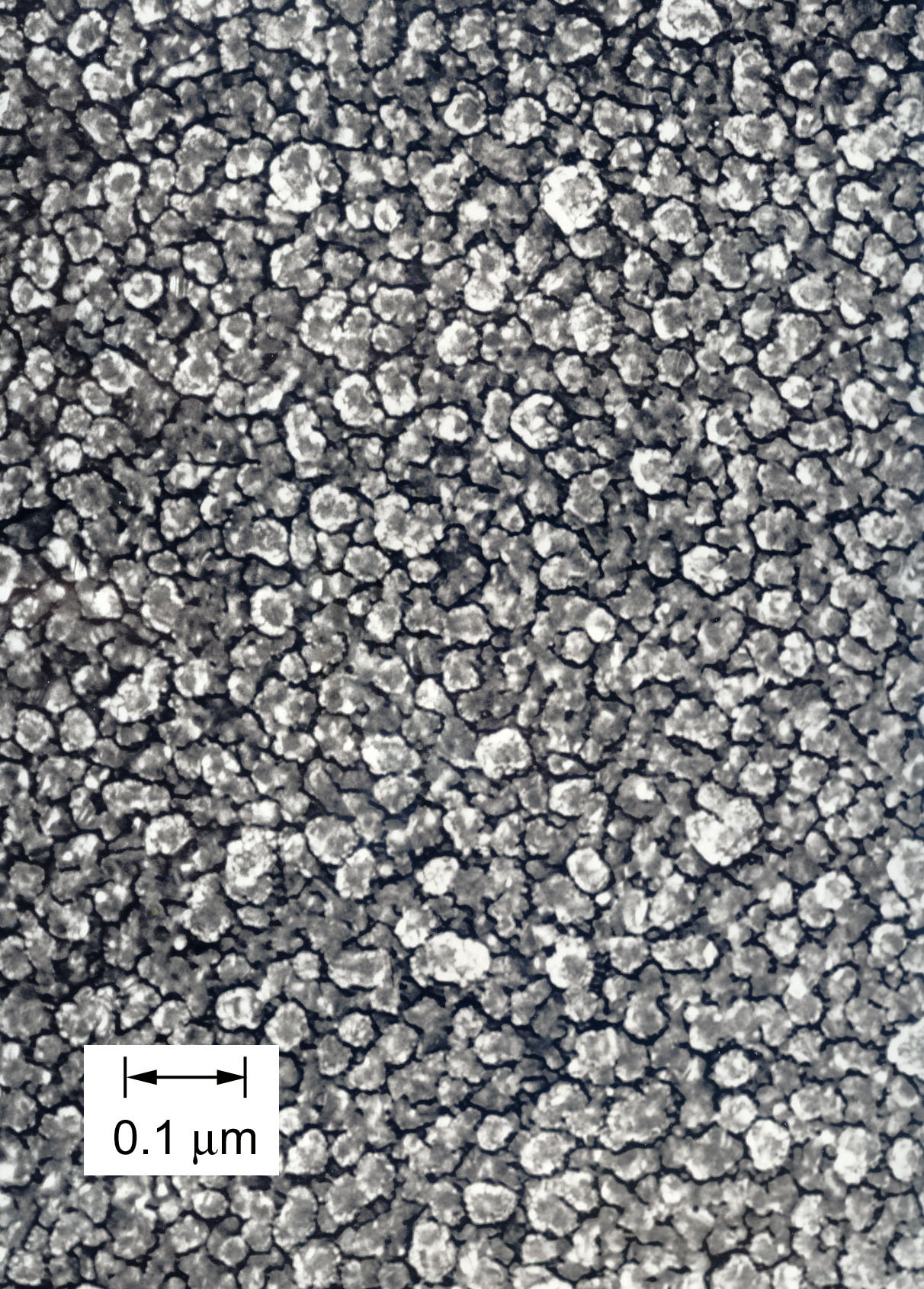
SEM image of a gold-coated replica of a ta-C "diamond-like" coating. Structural elements are not crystallites but are nodules of sp^{3}-bonded carbon atoms. The grains are so small that the surface appears mirror smooth to the eye.

There are several methods for producing DLC, which rely on the lower density of sp^{2} than sp^{3} carbon. So the application of pressure, impact, catalysis, or some combination of these at the atomic scale can force sp^{2} bonded carbon atoms closer together into sp^{3} bonds. This must be done vigorously enough that the atoms cannot simply spring back apart into separations characteristic of sp^{2} bonds. Usually techniques either combine such a compression with a push of the new cluster of sp^{3} bonded carbon deeper into the coating so that there is no room for expansion back to separations needed for sp^{2} bonding, or the new cluster is buried by the arrival of new carbon destined for the next cycle of impacts. It is reasonable to envisage the process as a "hail" of projectiles that produce localized, faster, nanoscale versions of the classic combinations of heat and pressure that produce natural and synthetic diamond. Because they occur independently at many places across the surface of a growing film or coating, they tend to produce an analog of a cobblestone street with the cobbles being nodules or clusters of sp^{3} bonded carbon. Depending upon the particular "recipe" being used, there are cycles of deposition of carbon and impact or continuous proportions of new carbon arriving and projectiles conveying the impacts needed to force the formation of the sp^{3} bonds. As a result, ta-C may have the structure of a cobblestone street, or the nodules may "melt together" to make something more like a sponge or the cobbles may be so small as to be nearly invisible to imaging. A classic "medium" morphology for a ta-C film is shown in the figure.

Diamond-like carbon can also be made from the Preceramic polymer poly(hydridocarbyne) through pyrolysis at atmospheric pressure, or through physical vapor deposition methods. Poly(hydridocarbyne) can be synthesized from haloforms in multiple ways, including the reduction of bromoform with NaK, or the electroinitiated polymerization of chloroform, with yields of 46-85% and 30-40% respectively. The electroinitiated polymerization method can also be generalized for other polycarbynes as well.

== Properties ==
As implied by the name, diamond-like carbon (DLC), the value of such coatings accrues from their ability to provide some of the properties of diamond to surfaces of almost any material. The primary desirable qualities are hardness, wear resistance, and slickness (DLC film friction coefficient against polished steel ranges from 0.05 to 0.20). DLC properties highly depends on plasma processing deposition parameters, like effect of bias voltage, DLC coating thickness, interlayer thickness, etc. Moreover, the heat treatment also change the coating properties such as hardness, toughness and wear rate.

However, which properties are added to a surface and to what degree depends upon which of the 7 forms are applied, and further upon the amounts and types of diluents added to reduce the cost of production. In 2006 the Association of German Engineers, VDI, the largest engineering association in Western Europe issued an authoritative report VDI2840 in order to clarify the existing multiplicity of confusing terms and trade names. It provides a unique classification and nomenclature for diamond-like-carbon (DLC) and diamond films. It succeeded in reporting all information necessary to identify and to compare different DLC films which are offered on the market. Quoting from that document:

These [sp^{3}] bonds can occur not only with crystals - in other words, in solids with long-range order - but also in amorphous solids where the atoms are in a random arrangement. In this case there will be bonding only between a few individual atoms and not in a long-range order extending over a large number of atoms. The bond types have a considerable influence on the material properties of amorphous carbon films. If the sp^{2} type is predominant the film will be softer, if the sp^{3} type is predominant the film will be harder.

A secondary determinant of quality was found to be the fractional content of hydrogen. Some of the production methods involve hydrogen or methane as a catalyst and a considerable percentage of hydrogen can remain in the finished DLC material. When it is recalled that the soft plastic, polyethylene is made from carbon that is bonded purely by the diamond-like sp^{3} bonds, but also includes chemically bonded hydrogen, it is not surprising to learn that fractions of hydrogen remaining in DLC films degrade them almost as much as do residues of sp^{2} bonded carbon. The VDI2840 report confirmed the utility of locating a particular DLC material onto a 2-dimensional map on which the X-axis described the fraction of hydrogen in the material and the Y-axis described the fraction of sp^{3} bonded carbon atoms. The highest quality of diamond-like properties was affirmed to be correlated with the proximity of the map point plotting the (X,Y) coordinates of a particular material to the upper left corner at (0,1), namely 0% hydrogen and 100% sp^{3} bonding. That "pure" DLC material is ta-C and others are approximations that are degraded by diluents such as hydrogen, sp^{2} bonded carbon, and metals. Valuable properties of materials that are ta-C, or nearly ta-C follow.

=== Hardness ===
STM image of surfaces at the edge of a 1 μm thick layer of ta-C "diamond-like" coating on 304 stainless steel after various durations of tumbling in a slurry of 240 mesh SiC abrasive. The first 100 min shows a burnishing away from the coating of an overburden of soft carbons than had been deposited after the last cycle of impacts converted bonds to sp^{3}. On the uncoated part of the sample, about 5 μm of steel were removed during subsequent tumbling while the coating completely protected the part of the sample it covered.

Within the "cobblestones", nodules, clusters, or "sponges" (the volumes in which local bonding is sp^{3}) bond angles may be distorted from those found in either pure cubic or hexagonal lattices because of intermixing of the two. The result is internal (compressive) stress that can appear to add to the hardness measured for a sample of DLC. Hardness is often measured by nanoindentation methods in which a finely pointed stylus of natural diamond is forced into the surface of a specimen. If the sample is so thin that there is only a single layer of nodules, then the stylus may enter the DLC layer between the hard cobblestones and push them apart without sensing the hardness of the sp^{3} bonded volumes. Measurements would be low. Conversely, if the probing stylus enters a film thick enough to have several layers of nodules so it cannot be spread laterally, or if it enters on top of a cobblestone in a single layer, then it will measure not only the real hardness of the diamond bonding, but an apparent hardness even greater because the internal compressive stress in those nodules would provide further resistance to penetration of the material by the stylus. Nanoindentation measurements have reported hardness as great as 50% more than values for natural crystalline diamond. Since the stylus is blunted in such cases or even broken, actual numbers for hardness that exceed that of natural diamond are meaningless. They only show that the hard parts of an optimal ta-C material will break natural diamond rather than the inverse. Nevertheless, from a practical viewpoint it does not matter how the resistance of a DLC material is developed, it can be harder than natural diamond in usage. One method of testing the coating hardness is by means of the Persoz pendulum.

In a microhardness test of a DLC coating (without metal added), a case-hardened 9310 bearing steel was tested using a diamond-tipped indenter tool supplied by Fisher Scientific International. The tool used a comparison of force applied to indentation depth, similar to the Rockwell Scale hardness measurement method. Microhardness testing of uncoated steel was limited to an indentation depth of approximately 1.2 microns. This same bearing steel was then coated with a 2.0 micron thickness DLC coating. Microhardness testing on the coated steel was then conducted, limiting indentation of the coating to a depth of approximately 0.15 microns, or 7.5 percent of the coating thickness. Measurements were repeated five times on uncoated steel and 12 times on coated steel. As a reference, the uncoated bearing steel had a hardness of Rockwell C 60. The average microhardness measured was 7,133 N/mm^{2} for the uncoated steel and 9,571 N/mm^{2} for the coated steel, suggesting the coating had a microhardness of approximately 34 percent harder than Rockwell C 60. A measurement of the plastic deformation, or permanent indentation scar, caused by the micro-indenter, indicated an elasticity of 35 percent for steel and 86 percent for the DLC. Measurement of plastic deformation is used for Vickers hardness measurements. As expected, the greater "closing" of the indentation scar for the coating suggested much higher Vickers hardness, in a ratio of greater than two times that of the uncoated steel, and therefore rendering Vickers hardness calculations not meaningful.

==== Bonding of DLC coatings ====
The same internal stress that benefits the hardness of DLC materials makes it difficult to bond such coatings to the substrates to be protected. The internal stresses try to "pop" the DLC coatings off of the underlying samples. This challenging downside of extreme hardness is answered in several ways, depending upon the particular "art" of the production process. The most simple is to exploit the natural chemical bonding that happens when carbon ions impact the surface of the item to be coated at high energies. If that item is made of a carbide-forming substance such as Ti or Fe in steel a layer of carbide will be formed that is later bonded to the DLC grown on top of it. Other methods of bonding include such strategies as depositing intermediate layers that have atomic spacings that grade from those of the substrate to those characteristic of sp^{3} bonded carbon. In 2006 there were as many successful recipes for bonding DLC coatings as there were sources of DLC.

=== Tribology ===
DLC coatings are often used to prevent wear due to their excellent tribological properties. DLC is very resistant to abrasive and adhesive wear making it suitable for use in applications that experience extreme contact pressure, both in rolling and sliding contact. DLC is often used to prevent wear on razor blades and metal cutting tools, including lathe inserts and milling cutters. DLC is used in bearings, cams, cam followers, and shafts in the automobile industry. The coatings reduce wear during the 'break-in' period, where drive train components may be starved for lubrication.

DLCs may also be used in chameleon coatings that are designed to prevent wear during launch, orbit, and re-entry of land-launched space vehicles. DLC provides lubricity at ambient atmosphere and at vacuum unlike graphite, which requires moisture to be lubricious. Isolated carbon particles embedded diamond-like carbon coatings are the recent development in this area. The wear rate of amorphous DLC can be reduced up to 60% by embedding isolated carbon nanoparticles embedded simultaneous to DLC deposition. The isolated particles were in-situ created through rapid plasma quenching with Helium pulses.

Despite the favorable tribological properties of DLC it must be used with caution on ferrous metals. If it is used at higher temperatures, the substrate or counter face may carburize, which could lead to loss of function due to a change in hardness. The final, end use temperature of a coated component should be kept below the temperature at which a PVC DLC coating is applied.

A new interface design between DLC-coated silicon wafer and metal is reported to increase the durability of DLC-coated silicon wafer against high contact stress from approximately 1.0 GPa to beyond 2.5 GPa.

=== Electrical ===
If a DLC material is close enough to ta-C on plots of bonding ratios and hydrogen content it can be an insulator with a high value of resistivity. Perhaps more interesting is that if prepared in the "medium" cobblestone version such as shown in the above figure, electricity is passed through it by a mechanism of hopping conductivity. In this type of conduction of electricity the electrons move by quantum mechanical tunneling between pockets of conductive material isolated in an insulator. The result is that such a process makes the material something like a semiconductor. Further research on electrical properties is needed to explicate such conductivity in ta-C in order to determine its practical value. However, a different electrical property of emissivity has been shown to occur at unique levels for ta-C. Such high values allow for electrons to be emitted from ta-C coated electrodes into vacuum or into other solids with application of modest levels of applied voltage. This has supported important advances in medical technology.

== Applications ==
Applications of DLC typically utilize the ability of the material to reduce abrasive wear. Tooling components, such as endmills, drill bits, dies and molds often use DLC in this manner. DLC is also used in the engines of modern supersport motorcycles, Formula 1 racecars, NASCAR vehicles, and as a coating on hard-disk platters and hard-disk read heads to protect against head crashes. Virtually all of the multi-bladed razors used for wet shaving have the edges coated with hydrogen-free DLC to reduce friction, preventing abrasion of sensitive skin. It is also being used as a coating by some weapon manufacturers/custom gunsmiths. Some forms have been certified in the EU for food service and find extensive uses in the high-speed actions involved in processing novelty foods such as potato chips and in guiding material flows in packaging foodstuffs with plastic wraps. DLC coats the cutting edges of tools for the high-speed, dry shaping of difficult exposed surfaces of wood and aluminium, for example on automobile dashboards. DLC coatings are widely used for lithium based energy storage batteries to improve their performance. DLC can increase retention capacity by 40% and cycle life by 400% for lithium batteries.

The wear, friction, and electrical properties of DLC make it an appealing material for medical applications. DLC has proved to have excellent bio-compatibility as well. This has enabled many medical procedures, such as percutaneous coronary intervention employing brachytherapy to benefit from the unique electrical properties of DLC. At low voltages and low temperatures electrodes coated with DLC can emit enough electrons to be arranged into disposable, micro-X-ray tubes as small as the radioactive seeds that are introduced into arteries or tumors in conventional brachytherapy. The same dose of prescribed radiation can be applied from the inside, out with the additional possibility to switch on and off the radiation in the prescribed pattern for the X-rays being used. DLC has proved to be an excellent coating to prolong the life of and reduce complications with replacement hip joints and artificial knees. It also has been successfully applied to coronary artery stents, reducing the incidence of thrombosis. The implantable human heart pump can be considered the ultimate biomedical application where DLC coating is used on blood contacting surfaces of the key components of the device. At hardness index, soft DLC coatings have shown better biocompatibility levels than hard DLC coatings, which may help to choose appropriate DLC coating for specific biomechanical applications, such as load-carrying or non-load carrying implants.

== Environmental benefits of durable products ==
The increase in lifetime of articles coated with DLC that wear out because of abrasion can be described by the formula f = (g)^{μ}, where g is a number that characterizes the type of DLC, the type of abrasion, the substrate material and μ is the thickness of the DLC coating in μm. For "low-impact" abrasion (pistons in cylinders, impellers in pumps for sandy liquids, etc.), g for pure ta-C on 304 stainless steel is 66. This means that one-μm thickness (that is ≈5% of the thickness of a human hair-end) would increase service lifetime for the article it coated from a week to over a year and two-μm thickness would increase it from a week to 85 years. These are measured values; though in the case of the 2 μm coating the lifetime was extrapolated from the last time the sample was evaluated until the testing apparatus itself wore out.

There are environmental arguments that a sustainable economy ought to encourage products to be engineered for durability—in other words, to have planned durability (the opposite of planned obsolescence).

Currently there are about 100 outsource vendors of DLC coatings that are loaded with amounts of graphite and hydrogen and so give much lower g-numbers than 66 on the same substrates.

== See also ==
- Chemical vapor deposition
- Cathodic arc deposition
- Poly(hydridocarbyne)
