= Hills cloud =

Vast, theoretical circumstellar disc

Artist's view of the theoretical Oort cloud, Hills cloud, and Kuiper belt (inset)

In astronomy, the Hills cloud (also called the inner Oort cloud and inner cloud) is a theoretical vast circumstellar disc, interior to the Oort cloud and roughly aligned with the solar ecliptic plane, whose outer border would be located at around 20,000 to 30,000 astronomical units (AU) from the Sun, and whose inner border, less well defined, is hypothetically located at 250–1500 AU, well beyond planetary and Kuiper belt object orbits—but distances might be much greater. If it exists, the Hills cloud likely contains roughly five times as many comets as the Oort cloud.

== Overview ==
The need for the Hills cloud hypothesis is intimately connected with the dynamics of the Oort cloud: Oort cloud comets are continually perturbed in their environment. A non-negligible fraction leaves the Solar System, or tumbles into the inner system where they evaporate, fall into the Sun, or collide with or are ejected by the giant planets. Hence, the Oort cloud should have been depleted long ago, but it is still well supplied with comets.

The Hills cloud hypothesis addresses the persistence of the Oort cloud by postulating a densely populated, inner-Oort region—the "Hills cloud". Objects ejected from the Hills cloud are likely to end up in the classical Oort cloud region, maintaining the Oort cloud. It is likely that the Hills cloud has the largest concentration of comets in the whole Solar System.

The existence of the Hills cloud is plausible, since many bodies have been found there already. It should be denser than the Oort cloud. Gravitational interaction with the closest stars and tidal effects from the galaxy have given circular orbits to the comets in the Oort cloud, which may not be the case for the comets in the Hills cloud. The Hills cloud's total mass is unknown; some scientists think it would be many times more massive than the outer Oort cloud.

== History ==
=== Original Oort cloud model ===
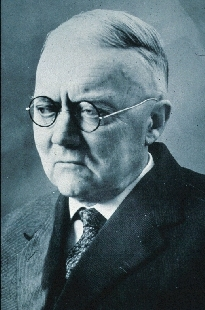
Ernst Öpik

Between 1932 and 1981, astronomers believed that the Oort cloud proposed by Ernst Öpik and Jan Oort, and the Kuiper belt were the only reserves of comets in the Solar System.

In 1932, Estonian astronomer Ernst Öpik hypothesized that comets were rooted in a cloud orbiting the outer boundary of the Solar System. In 1950, this idea was revived independently by Dutch astronomer Jan Oort to explain an apparent contradiction: Comets are destroyed after several passes through the inner Solar System, so if any had existed for several billion years (since the beginning of the Solar System), no more could be observed now.

Oort selected 46 comets for his study that were best observed between 1850 and 1952. The distribution of the reciprocal of the semi-major axes showed a maximum frequency which suggested the existence of a reservoir of comets between 40,000 and 150,000 AU (0.6 and 2.4 ly) away. This reservoir, located at the limits of the Sun's sphere of influence, would be subject to stellar disturbances, likely to expel cloud comets outwards or impel them inwards.

== New model ==
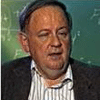
Jack G. Hills, the astronomer who first proposed the Hills cloud

In the 1980s, astronomers realized that the main cloud could have an internal section that would start at about 3,000 AU from the Sun and continue up to the classic cloud at 20,000 AU. Most estimates place the population of the Hills cloud at about 20 trillion (about five to ten times that of the outer cloud), although the number could be ten times greater than that.

The main model of an "inner cloud" was proposed in 1981 by the astronomer Jack G. Hills, from the Los Alamos Laboratory, who gave the region its name. He calculated that the passage of a star near the Solar System could have triggered a "comet rain," thereby causing extinctions on Earth.

His research suggested that the orbits of most cloud comets have a semi-major axis of 10,000 AU, much closer to the Sun than the proposed distance of the Oort cloud. Moreover, the influence of the surrounding stars and that of the galactic tide should have sent the Oort cloud comets either closer to the Sun or outside of the Solar System. To account for these issues, Hills proposed the presence of an inner cloud, which would have tens or hundreds of times as many comet nuclei as the outer halo. Thus, it would be a possible source of new comets to resupply the tenuous outer cloud.

In the following years other astronomers searched for the Hills cloud and studied long-period comets. This was the case with Sidney van den Bergh and Mark E. Bailey, who each suggested the Hills cloud's structure in 1982 and 1983, respectively. In 1986, Bailey stated that the majority of comets in the Solar System were located not in the Oort cloud area, but closer and in an internal cloud, with an orbit with a semi-major axis of 5,000 AU. The research was further expanded upon by studies of Victor Clube and Bill Napier (1987), and by R. B. Stothers (1988).

However, the Hills cloud gained major interest in 1991, when scientists resumed Hills' theory. (Note: The renewed interest excluded papers written by Martin Duncan, Thomas Quinn, and Scott Tremaine in 1987, which extended Hills' hypothesis with additional research.)

== Characteristics ==
=== Structure and composition ===
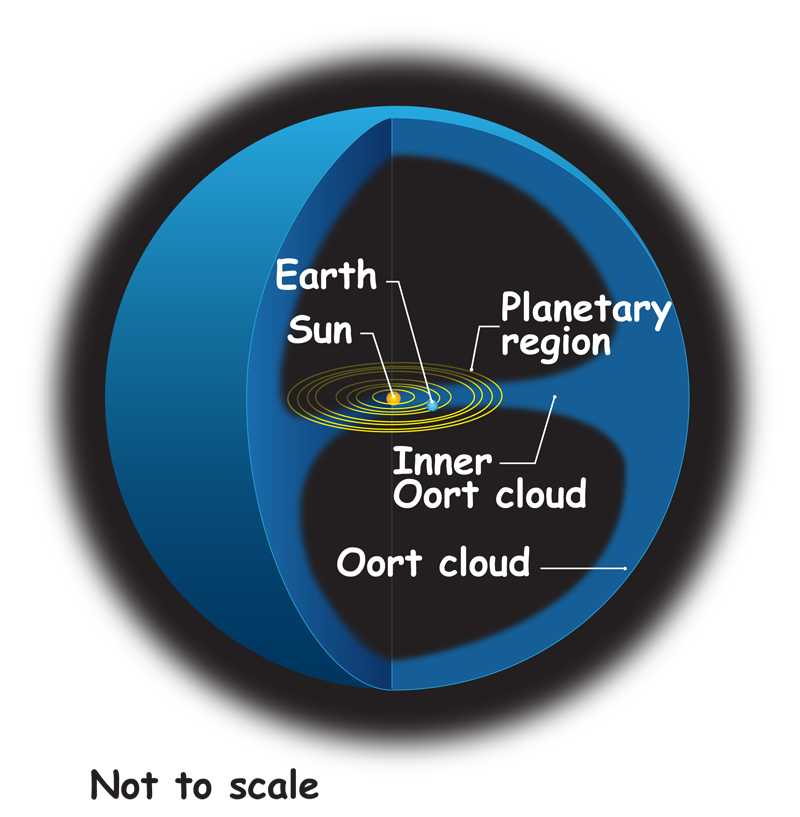
Interior and exterior Oort cloud

Oort cloud comets are constantly disturbed by their surroundings and distant objects. A significant number either leave the Solar System or go much closer to the Sun. The Oort cloud should therefore have broken apart long ago, but it still remains intact. The Hills cloud proposal could provide an explanation; J. G. Hills and other scientists suggest that it could replenish the comets in the outer Oort cloud.

It is also likely that the Hills cloud is the largest concentration of comets across the Solar System. The Hills cloud should be much denser than the outer Oort cloud: If it exists, it is somewhere between 5,000 and 20,000 AU in size. In contrast, the Oort cloud is between 20,000 and 50,000 AU (0.3 and 0.8 ly) in size.

The mass of the Hills cloud is not known. Some scientists believe it could be five times more massive than the Oort cloud. Mark E. Bailey estimates the mass of the Hills cloud to be 13.8 Earth masses, if the majority of the bodies are located at 10,000 AU.

If the analyses of comets are representative of the whole, the vast majority of Hills cloud objects consists of various ices, such as water, methane, ethane, carbon monoxide and hydrogen cyanide. However, the discovery of the object 1996 PW, an asteroid on a typical orbit of a long-period comet, suggests that the cloud may also contain rocky objects.

The carbon analysis and isotopic ratios of nitrogen firstly in the comets of the families of the Oort cloud and the other in the body of the Jupiter area shows little difference between the two, despite their distinctly remote areas. This suggests that both come from a protoplanetary disk, a conclusion also supported by studies of comet cloud sizes and the recent impact study of comet Tempel 1.

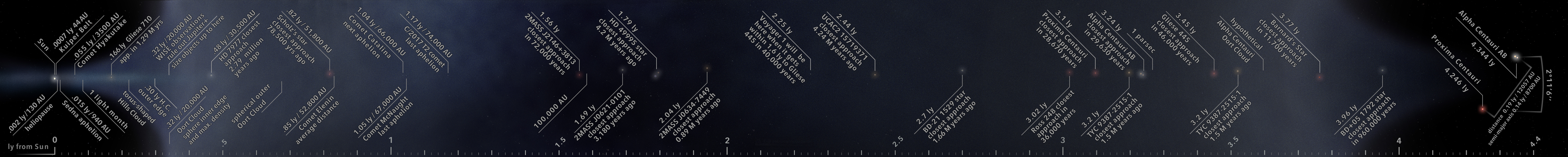
Schematic view to scale of known astronomical objects within 4.5 light years of the Sun. The Hills cloud is shown here as an aqua green line (cross-section of its torus shape).

=== Formation ===
Many scientists think that the Hills cloud formed from a close (800 AU) encounter between the Sun and another star within the first 800 million years of the Solar System, which could explain the eccentric orbit of 90377 Sedna, which should not be where it is, being neither influenced by Jupiter nor Neptune, nor tidal effects. It is then possible that the Hills cloud would be "younger" than the Oort cloud. However, only Sedna and two other sednoids (2012 VP_{113} and 541132 Leleākūhonua) bear those irregularities; for (87269) 2000 OO67 and (308933) 2006 SQ372 this theory is not necessary, because both orbit close to the Solar System's gas giants.

== Possible Hills cloud objects ==
Name	Diameter (km)	Perihelion (AU)	Aphelion (AU)	Discovery
2012 VP113	315 to 640	80.5	445	2012
(90377) Sedna	995 to 1,060	76.1	935	2003
(87269) 2000 OO67	28 to 87	20.8	1,014.2	2000
(308933) 2006 SQ372	50 to 100	24.17	2,005.38	2006
(541132) Leleākūhonua	200 to 248	64.94	2123	2015

Bodies in the Hills cloud are made mostly of water ice, methane and ammonia. Astronomers suspect many long-period comets originate from the Hills cloud, such as Comet Hyakutake.

In their article announcing the discovery of Sedna, Mike Brown and his colleagues asserted that they observed the first Oort cloud object. They observed that, unlike scattered disc objects like Eris, Sedna's perihelion (76 AU) was too remote for the gravitational influence of Neptune to have played a role in its evolution. The authors regarded Sedna as an "inner Oort cloud object", located along the ecliptic and placed between the Kuiper belt and the more spherical part of the Oort cloud. However, Sedna is much closer to the Sun than expected for objects in the Hills cloud and its inclination is close to that of the planets and the Kuiper belt.

Considerable mystery surrounds (528219) 2008 KV42, with its retrograde orbit that could make it originate from the Hills cloud or perhaps the Oort cloud. The same goes for damocloids, whose origins are doubtful, such as the namesake for this category, 5335 Damocles.

=== Comets ===
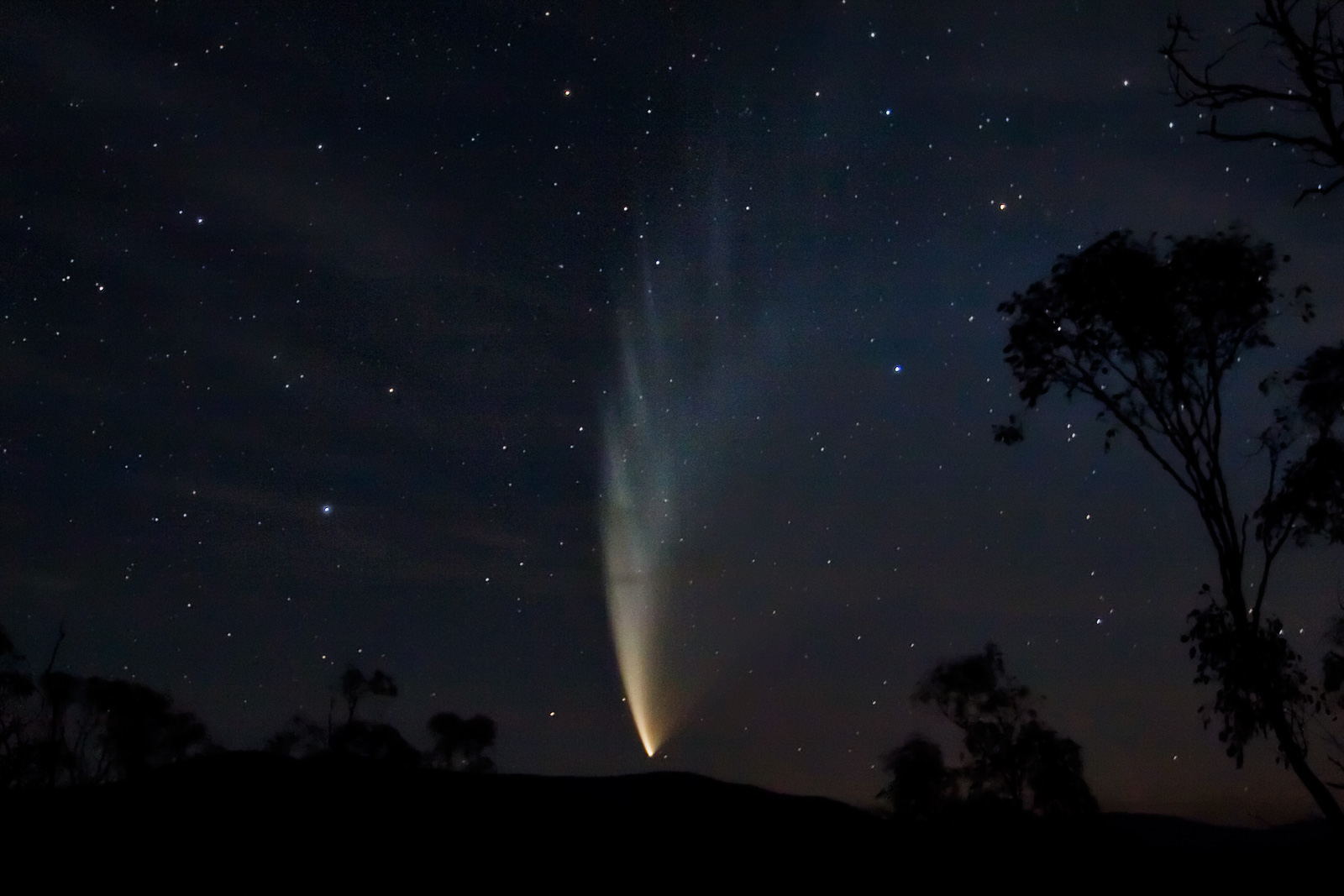
Comet McNaught

Astronomers suspect that several comets come from the same region as the Hills cloud; in particular, they focus on those with aphelia greater than 1,000 AU (which are thus from a farther region than the Kuiper belt), but less than 10,000 AU (or they would otherwise be too close to the outer Oort cloud).

Some famous comets reach great distances and are candidates for Hills cloud objects. For example, Comet Lovejoy, discovered on 15 March 2007 by Australian astronomer Terry Lovejoy, had an inbound aphelion distance of around 1,800 AU. Comet Hyakutake, discovered in 1996 by amateur astronomer Yuji Hyakutake, has an outbound aphelion of 3,500 AU. Comet McNaught, discovered on 7 August 2006 in Australia by Robert H. McNaught, became one of the brightest comets of recent decades, with an aphelion of 4,100 AU. Comet Machholz, discovered on 27 August 2004 by amateur astronomer Donald Machholz, came from about 5,000 AU.

=== Sedna ===
Sedna is a dwarf planet discovered by Michael E. Brown, Rob Trujillo and David L. Rabinowitz on 14 November 2003. Spectroscopic measures show that its surface composition is similar to that of other trans-Neptunian objects: It is mainly composed of a mixture of water ices, methane, and nitrogen with tholins. Its surface is one of the reddest in the Solar System.

This may be the first detection of an object originating from the Hills cloud, depending on the definition used. The area of the Hills cloud is defined as any objects with orbits measuring between 1,500 and 10,000 AU.

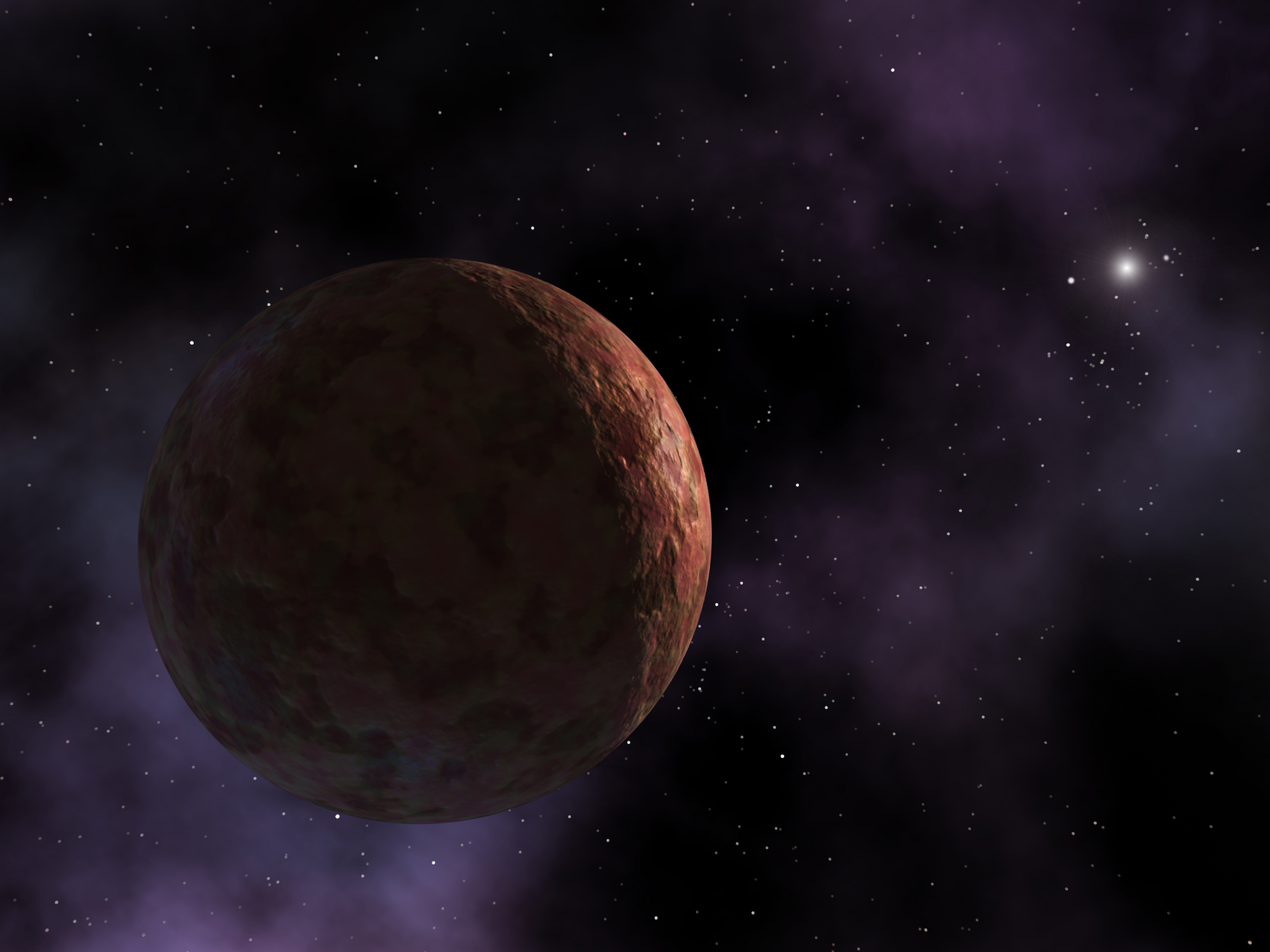
Artist's impression of Sedna

Sedna is, however, much closer than the supposed distance of the Hills cloud. The dwarf planet discovered at a distance of about 13 billion kilometres (87 AU) from the Sun, travels in an elliptical orbit of 11,400 years with a perihelion point of only 76 AU from the Sun during its closest approach (the next to occur in 2076), and travels out to 936 AU at its farthest point.

However, Sedna is not considered a Kuiper belt object, because its orbit does not bring it into the region of the Kuiper belt at 50 AU. Sedna is a "detached object", and thus is not in a resonance with Neptune.

=== 2012 VP_{113} ===
The trans-Neptunian object 2012 VP113 was announced on 26 March 2014 and has a similar orbit to Sedna with a perihelion point significantly detached from Neptune. Its orbit lies between 80 and 400 AU from the Sun.
