= (523622) 2007 TG422 =

Trans-Neptunian object

(523622) 2007 TG_{422}
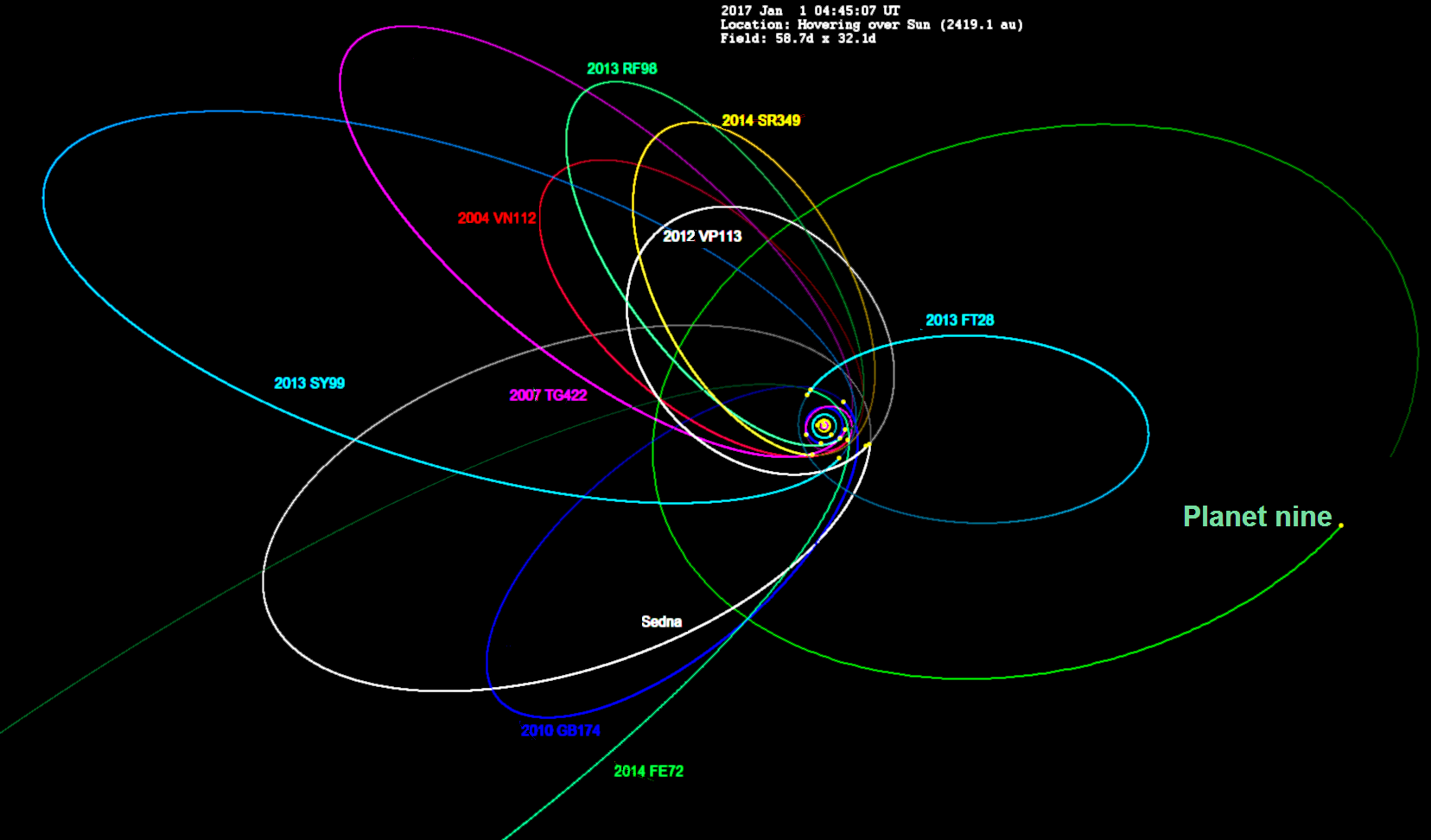
- Orbital diagram of extreme trans-Neptunian objects, including 2007 TG_{422}, together with the hypothetical Planet Nine

Discovery
- Discovered by: A. C. Becker; A. W. Puckett; J. Kubica
- Discovery site: APO
- Discovery date: 3 October 2007

Designations
- Minor planet category: TNO; SDO; ESDO; p-DP; distant

Orbital characteristics
- Epoch 27 April 2019 (JD 2458600.5)
- Uncertainty parameter 1
- Observation arc: 13.14 yr (4,800 d)
- Aphelion: 910.01 AU
- Perihelion: 35.532 AU
- Semi-major axis: 472.77 AU
- Eccentricity: 0.9248
- Orbital period (sidereal): 10279.78 yr (3,754,688 d)
- Mean anomaly: 0.4774°
- Mean motion: 0° 0^{m} 0.36^{s} / day
- Inclination: 18.620°
- Longitude of ascending node: 112.84°
- Argument of perihelion: 285.54°

Physical characteristics
- Mean diameter: 222 km; 330 km
- Geometric albedo: 0.04 (est.)
- Spectral type: blue; B–I = 1.900±0.020; B–R = 1.390±0.040; R–I = 0.510±0.040; V–R = 0.510±0.040
- Apparent magnitude: 22.4
- Absolute magnitude (H): 6.5

(523622) 2007 TG_{422} is a trans-Neptunian object on a highly eccentric orbit in the scattered disc region at the edge of Solar System. Approximately 260 kilometers (160 miles) in diameter, it was discovered on 3 October 2007 by astronomers Andrew Becker, Andrew Puckett and Jeremy Kubica during the Sloan Digital Sky Survey at Apache Point Observatory in New Mexico, United States. It belongs to a group of objects studied in 2014, which led to the proposition of the hypothetical Planet Nine.

== Orbit and classification ==
2007 TG_{422} orbits the Sun at a distance of 35.5–910 AU once every 10279 years and 9 months (3,754,688 days; semi-major axis of 473 AU). Its orbit has an exceptionally high eccentricity of 0.92 and an inclination of 19° with respect to the ecliptic.

2007 TG_{422} is an extended scattered disc object, as its large aphelion distance is similar to that of the detached objects such as the sednoids (e.g. 90377 Sedna), its perihelion distance, however, is much lower and still just inside the gravitational influence of Neptune. The object came to perihelion in 2005 at a heliocentric distance of 35.5 AU, and is currently 37.9 AU from the Sun. It was in the constellation of Taurus until 2018, and came to opposition 29 November 2017. The body's observation arc begins at Apache Point in September 2007, one month prior to its official discovery observation. It has since been observed over a hundred times and has an orbital uncertainty of 1.

=== Unstable heliocentric solutions ===
Year (Note: Heliocentric solution unstable due to the changing position of Jupiter over Jupiter's 12 year orbit which perturbs the eccentricity of the two-body solution of the Sun+asteroid. Barycentric solutions are more stable for objects that take thousands of years to orbit the Sun.) (epoch)	Aphelion (AU)	Orbital period years
28 August 2007	932	10652
30 September 2012	1099	13512
16 February 2017	917	10399
26 June 2018	901	10143
Stable; Barycentric; 2017	970	11300

Given the orbital eccentricity of this object, different epochs can generate quite different heliocentric unperturbed two-body best-fit solutions to the aphelion (maximum distance from the Sun) of this object. (Note: Read osculating orbit for more details about heliocentric unperturbed two-body solutions) With a 2007 epoch the object had an approximate period of about 10,611 years with aphelion at 930 AU. But using a 2012 epoch shows a period of about 13,512 years with aphelion at 1099 AU. For objects at such high eccentricity, the Sun's barycentric coordinates are more stable than heliocentric coordinates. Using JPL Horizons with an observed orbital arc of 5 years, the barycentric orbital elements for epoch 2008-May-14 generate a semi-major axis of 503 AU and a period of 11,300 years. For comparison, Sedna has a barycentric semi-major axis of 506 AU and a period of 11,400 years. Both (308933) 2006 SQ372 and (87269) 2000 OO67 take longer than Sedna and 2007 TG_{422} to orbit the Sun using barycentric coordinates.

== Numbering and naming ==
This minor planet was numbered by the Minor Planet Center on 25 September 2018 (M.P.C. 111778). As of 2025, it has not been named.

== Physical characteristics ==
2007 TG_{422} is expected to have a low albedo (see below) due to its blue (neutral) color.

=== Diameter and albedo ===
According to Johnston's Archive and to Michael Brown, 2007 TG_{422} measures 222 and 331 kilometers in diameter, based on an absolute magnitude of 6.5 and an assumed standard albedo of 0.09 and 0.04 for the body's surface, respectively. As of 2018, no rotational lightcurve has been obtained from photometric observations. The body's rotation period, pole and shape remain unknown.

== Comparison ==
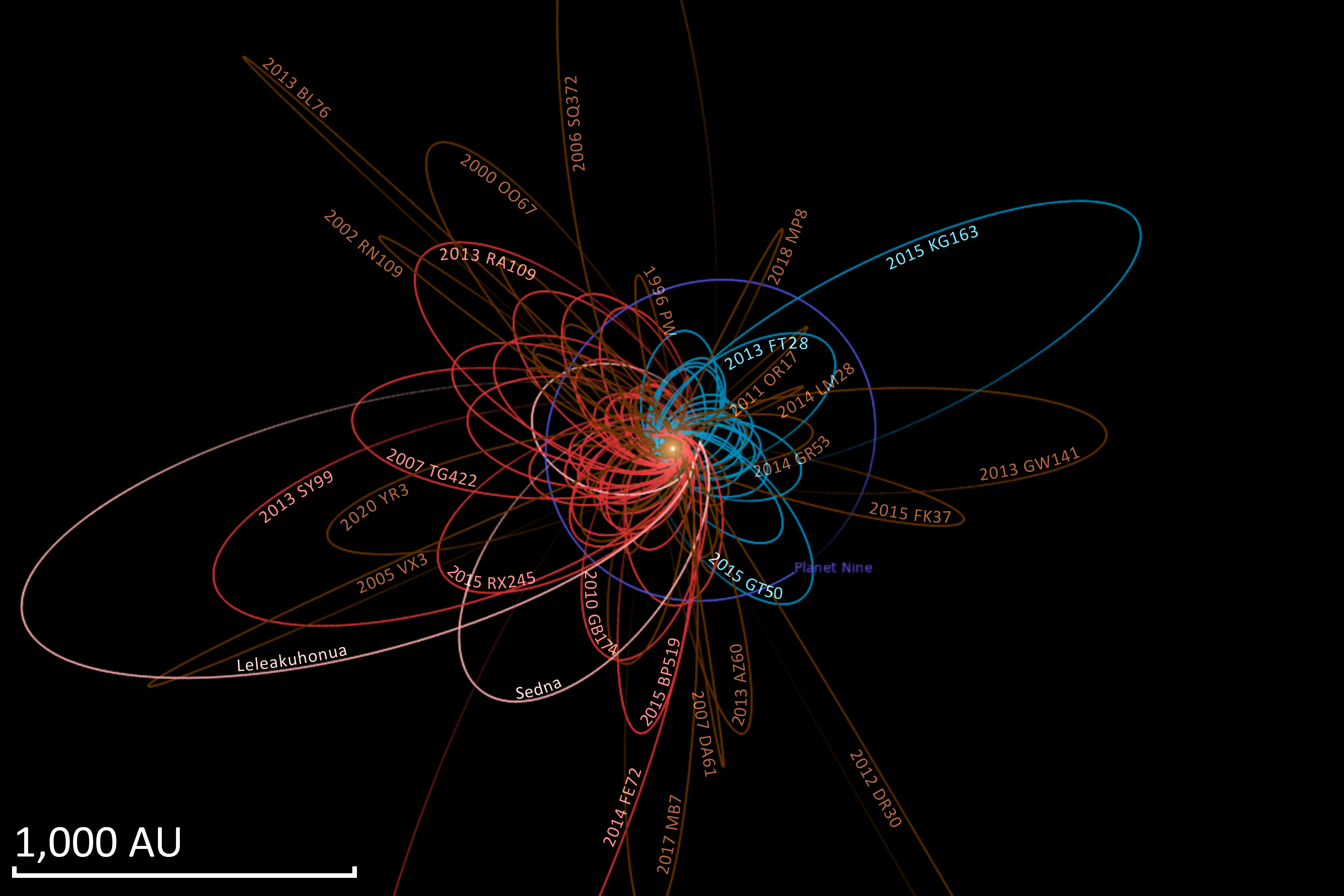
The orbits of Sedna, 2012 VP113, Leleākūhonua, and other very distant objects along with the predicted orbit of Planet Nine. The three sednoids (pink) along with the red-colored extreme trans-Neptunian object (eTNO) orbits are suspected to be aligned with the hypothetical Planet Nine while the blue-colored eTNO orbits are anti-aligned. The highly elongated orbits colored brown include centaurs and damocloids with large aphelion distances over 200 AU.
