= Barycenter =

Center of mass of multiple bodies orbiting each other

Animation of barycenters

Two bodies with similar mass, like the 90 Antiope asteroid system

Two bodies with slightly different masses, like Pluto and Charon

Two bodies with significant difference in masses, like Earth and the Moon

Two bodies with an extreme difference in mass, like the Sun and Earth

Two bodies with the same mass with eccentric elliptic orbits, common for binary stars, like Alpha Centauri

In astronomy, the barycenter (or barycentre; from Ancient Greek βάρος (báros) 'weight' and κέντρον (kéntron) 'center') is the center of mass around which two or more bodies orbit. A barycenter is a dynamical point, not a physical object. It is an important concept in fields such as astronomy and astrophysics. The distance from a body's center of mass to the barycenter can be calculated as a two-body problem.

If one of the two orbiting bodies is much more massive than the other and the bodies are relatively close to one another, the barycenter will typically be located within the more massive object. In this case, rather than the two bodies appearing to orbit a point between them, the less massive body will appear to orbit about the more massive body, while the more massive body might be observed to wobble slightly. This is the case for the Earth–Moon system, whose barycenter is located on average 4,671 km (2,902 mi) from Earth's center, which is 74% of Earth's radius of 6,378 km (3,963 mi). When the two bodies are of similar masses, the barycenter will generally be located between them and both bodies will orbit around it. This is the case for Pluto and Charon, one of Pluto's natural satellites, as well as for many binary asteroids and binary stars. When the less massive object is far away, the barycenter can be located outside the more massive object. This is the case for Jupiter and the Sun; despite the Sun being a thousand times more massive than Jupiter, their barycenter is slightly outside the Sun due to the relatively large distance between them.

In astronomy, barycentric coordinates are non-rotating coordinates with the origin at the barycenter of two or more bodies. The International Celestial Reference System (ICRS) is a barycentric coordinate system centered on the Solar System's barycenter.

== Two-body problem ==
The barycenter is one of the foci of the elliptical orbit of each body. This is an important concept in the fields of astronomy and astrophysics. In a simple two-body case, the distance from the center of the primary to the barycenter, r_{1}, is given by:
$$r_1 = a \cdot \frac{m_2}{m_1 + m_2} = \frac{a}{1 + \frac{m_1}{m_2}}$$
where:

- r_{1} is the distance from body 1's center to the barycenter;
- a is the distance between the centers of the two bodies; and
- m_{1} and m_{2} are the masses of the two bodies.

The semi-major axis of the secondary's orbit, r_{2}, is given by r_{2} = a − r_{1}.

When the barycenter is located within the more massive body, that body will appear to "wobble" rather than to follow a discernible orbit.

=== Primary–secondary examples ===
The following table sets out some examples from the Solar System. Figures are given rounded to three significant figures. The terms "primary" and "secondary" are used to distinguish between involved participants, with the larger being the primary and the smaller being the secondary.

- m_{1} is the mass of the primary in Earth masses (M_{🜨})
- m_{2} is the mass of the secondary in Earth masses (M_{🜨})
- a (km) is the average orbital distance between the centers of the two bodies
- r_{1} (km) is the distance from the center of the primary to the barycenter
- R_{1} (km) is the radius of the primary
- r_{1}/R_{1} a value less than one means the barycenter lies inside the primary

Primary–secondary examples
Primary	Secondary	m_{1} (M_{🜨})	m_{2} (M_{🜨})	a (km)	r_{1} (km)	R_{1} (km)	r_{1}/R_{1}
Earth	Moon	1	0.0123	384,400	4,671	6,371	0.733 (Note: The Earth has a perceptible "wobble". Also see tides.)
Pluto	Charon	0.0021	0.000254 (0.121 M_{♇})	19,600	2,110	1,188.3	1.78 (Note: Pluto and Charon are sometimes considered a binary system because their barycenter does not lie within either body.)
Sun	Earth	333,000	1	150,000,000 (1 AU)	449	695,700	0.000645 (Note: The Sun's wobble is barely perceptible.)
Sun	Jupiter	333,000	318 (0.000955 M_{☉})	778,000,000 (5.20 AU)	742,370	695,700	1.07 (Note: The Sun orbits a barycenter just above its surface.)
Sun	Saturn	333,000	95.2	1,433,530,000 (9.58 AU)	409,700	695,700	0.59

=== Example with the Sun ===
Motion of the Solar System's barycenter relative to the Sun

The center of the Solar System according to the position of the planets (Jupiter, Saturn, Uranus, Neptune)

If m_{1} ≫ m_{2} – which is true for the Sun and any planet – then the ratio r_{1}/R_{1} approximates to:
$$\frac{a}{R_1} \cdot \frac{m_2}{m_1}.$$

Hence, the barycenter of the Sun–planet system will lie outside the Sun only if:
$$\begin{align}
{a \over R_\odot} \cdot {m_\mathrm{planet} \over M_\odot} &> 1 \\
\implies \; {a \cdot m_\mathrm{planet}} &> {R_\odot \cdot M_\odot} \\
&\approx 2.3 \times 10^{11} \; M_\oplus \; \mbox{km} \\
&\approx 1530 \; M_\oplus \; \mbox{AU};
\end{align}$$
that is, where the planet is massive and far from the Sun.

If Jupiter had Mercury's orbit (57,900,000 km, 0.387 AU), the Sun–Jupiter barycenter would be approximately 55,000 km from the center of the Sun (r_{1}/R_{1} ≈ 0.08). But even if the Earth had Eris's orbit (1.02×10^{10} km, 68 AU), the Sun–Earth barycenter would still be within the Sun (just over 30,000 km from the center).

To calculate the actual motion of the Sun, only the motions of the four giant planets (Jupiter, Saturn, Uranus, Neptune) need to be considered. The contributions of all other planets, dwarf planets, etc. are negligible. If the four giant planets were on a straight line on the same side of the Sun, the combined center of mass would lie at about 1.17 solar radii, or just over 810,000 km, above the Sun's surface.

The calculations above are based on the mean distance between the bodies and yield the mean value r_{1}. But all celestial orbits are elliptical, and the distance between the bodies varies between the apses, depending on the eccentricity, e. Hence, the position of the barycenter varies too, and it is possible in some systems for the barycenter to be sometimes inside and sometimes outside the more massive body. This occurs where:
$$\frac{1}{1-e} > \frac{r_1}{R_1} > \frac{1}{1+e}.$$

The Sun–Jupiter system, with e_{Jupiter} = 0.0484, just fails to qualify: 1.05 < 1.07 > 0.954.

== Relativistic corrections ==
In classical mechanics (Newtonian gravitation), this definition simplifies calculations and introduces no known problems. In general relativity (Einsteinian gravitation), complications arise because, while it is possible, within reasonable approximations, to define the barycenter, we find that the associated coordinate system does not fully reflect the inequality of clock rates at different locations. Brumberg explains how to set up barycentric coordinates in general relativity.

The coordinate systems involve a world-time, i.e. a global time coordinate that could be set up by telemetry. Individual clocks of similar construction will not agree with this standard, because they are subject to differing gravitational potentials or move at various velocities, so the world-time must be synchronized with some ideal clock that is assumed to be very far from the whole self-gravitating system. This time standard is called Barycentric Coordinate Time (TCB).

== Selected barycentric orbital elements ==
Barycentric osculating orbital elements for some objects in the Solar System are as follows:

Barycentric osculating orbital elements for selected Solar System objects
Object	Semi-major axis (in AU)	Apoapsis (in AU)	Orbital period (in years)
C/2006 P1 (McNaught)	2,050	4,100	92,600
C/1996 B2 (Hyakutake)	1,700	3,410	70,000
C/2006 M4 (SWAN)	1,300	2,600	47,000
(308933) 2006 SQ372	799	1,570	22,600
(87269) 2000 OO67	549	1,078	12,800
90377 Sedna	506	937	11,400
(523622) 2007 TG422	501	967	11,200

For objects at such high eccentricity, barycentric coordinates are more stable than heliocentric coordinates for a given epoch because the barycentric osculating orbit is not as greatly affected by where Jupiter is on its 11.8 year orbit.

== See also ==
- Barycentric Dynamical Time
- Centers of gravity in non-uniform fields
- Center of mass
- Lagrange point
- Mass point geometry
- Roll center
- Weight distribution
