= Amorphous carbon =

Carbon that has no crystalline structure

Amorphous carbon is free, reactive carbon that has no crystalline structure. Amorphous carbon materials may be stabilized by terminating dangling-π bonds with hydrogen. As with other amorphous solids, some short-range order can be observed. Amorphous carbon is often abbreviated to aC for general amorphous carbon, aC:H or HAC for hydrogenated amorphous carbon, or to ta-C for tetrahedral amorphous carbon (also called diamond-like carbon).

== In mineralogy ==
In mineralogy, amorphous carbon is the name used for coal, carbide-derived carbon, and other impure forms of carbon that are neither graphite nor diamond. In a crystallographic sense, however, the materials are not truly amorphous but rather polycrystalline materials of graphite or diamond within an amorphous carbon matrix. Commercial carbon also usually contains significant quantities of other elements, which may also form crystalline impurities.

== In modern science ==
With the development of modern thin film deposition and growth techniques in the latter half of the 20th century, such as chemical vapour deposition, sputter deposition, and cathodic arc deposition, it became possible to fabricate truly amorphous carbon materials.

True amorphous carbon has localized π electrons (as opposed to the aromatic π bonds in graphite), and its bonds form with lengths and distances that are inconsistent with any other allotrope of carbon. It also contains a high concentration of dangling bonds; these cause deviations in interatomic spacing (as measured using diffraction) of more than 5% as well as noticeable variation in bond angle.

The properties of amorphous carbon films vary depending on the parameters used during deposition. The primary method for characterizing amorphous carbon is through the ratio of sp^{2} to sp^{3} hybridized bonds present in the material. Graphite consists purely of sp^{2} hybridized bonds, whereas diamond consists purely of sp^{3} hybridized bonds. Materials that are high in sp^{3} hybridized bonds are referred to as tetrahedral amorphous carbon, owing to the tetrahedral shape formed by sp^{3} hybridized bonds, or as diamond-like carbon (owing to the similarity of many physical properties to those of diamond).

Experimentally, sp^{2} to sp^{3} ratios can be determined by comparing the relative intensities of various spectroscopic peaks (including EELS, XPS, and Raman spectroscopy) to those expected for graphite or diamond. In theoretical works, the sp^{2} to sp^{3} ratios are often obtained by counting the number of carbon atoms with three bonded neighbors versus those with four bonded neighbors. (This technique requires deciding on a somewhat arbitrary metric for determining whether neighboring atoms are considered bonded or not, and is therefore merely used as an indication of the relative sp^{2}-sp^{3} ratio.)

Although the characterization of amorphous carbon materials by the sp^{2}-sp^{3} ratio may seem to indicate a one-dimensional range of properties between graphite and diamond, this is most definitely not the case. Research is currently ongoing into ways to characterize and expand on the range of properties offered by amorphous carbon materials.

All practical forms of hydrogenated carbon (e.g. smoke, chimney soot, mined coal such as bitumen and anthracite) contain large amounts of polycyclic aromatic hydrocarbon tars, and are therefore almost certainly carcinogenic.

== Q-carbon ==
Q-carbon, short for quenched carbon, is claimed to be a type of amorphous carbon that is ferromagnetic, electrically conductive, harder than diamond, and able to exhibit high-temperature superconductivity. A research group led by Professor Jagdish Narayan and graduate student Anagh Bhaumik at North Carolina State University announced the discovery of Q-carbon in 2015. They have published numerous papers on the synthesis and characterization of Q-carbon, but years later, there is no independent experimental confirmation of this substance and its properties.

According to the researchers, Q-carbon exhibits a random amorphous structure that is a mix of 3-way (sp^{2}) and 4-way (sp^{3}) bonding, rather than the uniform sp^{3} bonding found in diamonds. Carbon is melted using nanosecond laser pulses, then quenched rapidly to form Q-carbon, or a mixture of Q-carbon and diamond. Q-carbon can be made to take multiple forms, from nanoneedles to large-area diamond films. The researchers also reported the creation of nitrogen-vacancy nanodiamonds and Q-boron nitride (Q-BN), as well as the conversion of carbon into diamond and h-BN into c-BN at ambient temperatures and air pressures. The group obtained patents on q-materials and intended to commercialize them.

In 2018, a team at University of Texas at Austin used simulations to propose theoretical explanations of the reported properties of Q-carbon, including the record high-temperature superconductivity, ferromagnetism and hardness. However, their simulations have not been verified by other researchers.

== See also ==
- Glassy carbon
- Diamond-like carbon
- Carbon black
- Soot
- Carbon
