= C/2006 M4 (SWAN) =

Non-periodic comet

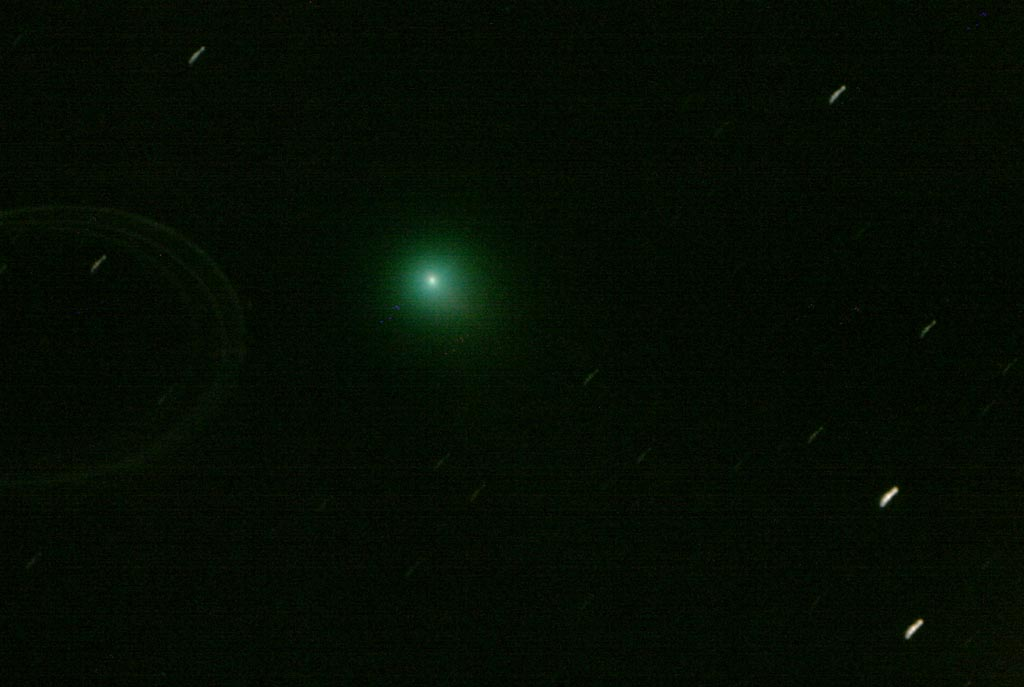
- Comet SWAN in an outburst as photographed on 22 October 2006

Discovery
- Discovered by: Robert D. Matson; Michael Mattiazzo
- Discovery site: SOHO (SWAN)
- Discovery date: 20 June 2006

Orbital characteristics
- Epoch: 10 November 2006 (JD 2454049.5)
- Orbit type: Oort cloud
- Aphelion: ~9,800 AU (inbound); ~2,640 AU (outbound)
- Perihelion: 0.783 AU
- Semi-major axis: 1,300 AU
- Eccentricity: 0.9998
- Orbital period: ~340,000 years (inbound); ~48,000 years (outbound)
- Inclination: 111.82°
- Longitude of ascending node: 148.73°
- Argument of periapsis: 62.594°
- Last perihelion: 28 September 2006
- Earth MOID: 0.070 AU
- Jupiter MOID: 1.089 AU

Physical characteristics
- Comet total magnitude (M1): 11.0
- Apparent magnitude: 4.0 (2006 apparition)

C/2006 M4 (SWAN) is a non-periodic comet discovered in late June 2006 by Robert D. Matson of Irvine, California and Michael Mattiazzo of Adelaide, South Australia in publicly available images of the Solar and Heliospheric Observatory (SOHO). These images were captured by the Solar Wind ANisotropies (SWAN) Lyman-alpha all-sky camera on board the SOHO. The comet was officially announced after a ground-based confirmation by Robert McNaught (Siding Spring Survey) on July 12.

Although perihelion was reached on 28 September 2006, the comet flared dramatically from an outburst, resulting in its apparent magnitude to increase from 7.0 to 4.0 on 24 October 2006, becoming barely visible with the naked eye. The comet later experienced a disruption event on its plasma tail caused by an encounter with a high-speed stream in the solar wind.

== Orbit ==
Comet C/2006 M4 is in a hyperbolic trajectory (with an osculating eccentricity larger than 1) during its passage through the inner Solar System. After leaving the influence of the planets, the eccentricity will drop below 1 and it will remain bound to the Solar System as an Oort cloud comet.

Given the extreme orbital eccentricity of this object, different epochs can generate quite different heliocentric unperturbed two-body best-fit solutions to the aphelion distance of this object. For objects at such high eccentricity, the Suns barycentric coordinates are more stable than heliocentric coordinates. Using JPL Horizons, the barycentric orbital elements for epoch 2013-May-14 generate a semi-major axis of about 1,300 AU (190 billion km) and a period of about 48,000 years.

== Physical characteristics ==
Volatile organic emissions from the comet showed an abundance of H_{2}O, CO, CH_{3}OH, CH_{4}, and C_{2}H_{6}, with trace amounts of HCN and CN within its coma.
