= Sedna (dwarf planet) =

Distant body in the outer Solar System

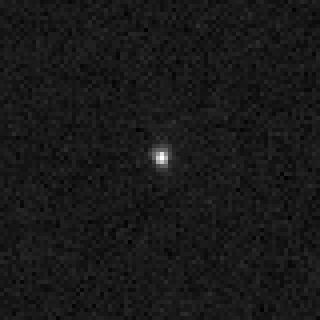
- Low-resolution image of Sedna by the Hubble Space Telescope, March 2004

Discovery
- Discovered by: Michael Brown; Chad Trujillo; David Rabinowitz
- Discovery site: Palomar Observatory
- Discovery date: 14 November 2003

Designations
- Pronunciation: /ˈsɛdnə/
- Named after: Sedna (Inuit goddess of sea and marine animals)
- Alternative designations: (90377) Sedna; 2003 VB_{12}
- Minor planet category: TNO · detached sednoid dwarf planet
- Adjectives: Sednian
- Symbol: (mostly astrological)

Orbital characteristics (barycentric)
- Epoch 31 May 2020 (JD 2458900.5)
- Uncertainty parameter 2
- Observation arc: 35.43 years
- Earliest precovery date: 25 September 1990
- Aphelion: 937 AU (140 billion km) or 0.015 ly (Note: Given the orbital eccentricity of this object, different epochs can generate quite different heliocentric unperturbed two-body best-fit solutions to the orbital period. Using a 1990 epoch, Sedna has a 12,100-year orbit, but using a 2019 epoch Sedna has a 10,500-year orbit. For objects at such high eccentricity, the Solar System's barycenter (Sun+Jupiter) generates solutions that are more stable than heliocentric solutions. Using JPL Horizons, the barycentric orbital period is consistently about 11,388 years, with a variation of 2 years over the next two centuries.)
- Perihelion: 76.19 AU (11.4 billion km)
- Semi-major axis: 506 AU (76 billion km) or 0.007 ly
- Eccentricity: 0.8496
- Orbital period (sidereal): 12679 yr (barycentric)
- Orbital period (synodic): 11,408 Gregorian years
- Average orbital speed: 0.99 km/s
- Mean anomaly: 358.596°
- Mean motion: 0° 0^{m} 0.28^{s} / day
- Inclination: 11.925°
- Longitude of ascending node: 144.506°
- Time of perihelion: ≈ 18 July 2076
- Argument of perihelion: 311.099°
- Known satellites: 0

Physical characteristics
- Mean diameter: 995±80 km 906+314 −258 km > 1025±135 km (occultation chord)
- Synodic rotation period: 10.273±0.002 h (~18 h less likely)
- Geometric albedo: 0.410+0.393 −0.186
- Temperature: ≈ 12 K (see note)
- Spectral type: (red) B−V=1.24; V−R=0.78
- Apparent magnitude: 20.8 (opposition); 20.5 (perihelic)
- Absolute magnitude (H): 1.56±0.01; 1.50

Sedna (minor-planet number 90377) is a dwarf planet in the outermost reaches of the Solar System, orbiting the Sun far beyond the orbit of Neptune. It was discovered in 2003, and is roughly 1,000 km in diameter. Spectroscopic analysis has revealed its surface to be a mixture of the solid ices of water, carbon dioxide, and ethane, along with sedimentary deposits of methane-derived, reddish-colored tholins, a chemical makeup similar to the surfaces of other trans-Neptunian objects. Sedna is not expected to have a substantial atmosphere. Within the range of uncertainty, it is tied with Ceres in the asteroid belt as the largest dwarf planet not known to have a moon. Owing to its lack of known moons, Sedna's mass and density remain unknown.

Sedna takes approximately 11,400 years to complete one orbit around the Sun. Its orbit is one of the widest known in the Solar System. Its aphelion is located 937 astronomical units (AU) away, about 19 times farther than that of Pluto. Sedna's orbit is also one of the most elliptical discovered, with an eccentricity of 0.85. As of 2026, Sedna is 83.0 AU (12.4 billion km) from the Sun, 2.5 times as far away as Neptune.

Upon its discovery, Sedna was initially classified as a member of the scattered disc, a group of objects sent into high-eccentricity orbits by the gravitational influence of Neptune. Some astronomers instead referred to it as the first known member of the inner Oort cloud, as its perihelion at 76.2 AU (11.4 billion km) is far too distant for it to have been scattered by any of the known planets. It has since become the prototype of a new class of objects characterized by highly eccentric orbits with very distant perihelia, the sednoids. The astronomer Michael E. Brown, co-discoverer of Sedna, has argued that its unusual orbit could provide information on the early evolution of the Solar System. Sedna might have been perturbed into its orbit through a close gravitational encounter with the hypothetical Planet Nine.

== History ==
=== Discovery ===
Sedna (provisionally designated 2003 VB_{12}) was discovered by Michael Brown (Caltech), Chad Trujillo (Gemini Observatory), and David Rabinowitz (Yale University) on 14 November 2003. The discovery formed part of a survey begun in 2001 with the Samuel Oschin telescope at Palomar Observatory near San Diego, California, using Yale's 160-megapixel Palomar Quest camera. On that day, an object was observed to move by 4.6 arcseconds over 3.1 hours relative to stars, which indicated that its distance was about 100 AU. Follow-up observations were made in November–December 2003 with the SMARTS (Small and Medium Research Telescope System) at Cerro Tololo Inter-American Observatory in Chile, the Tenagra IV telescope in Nogales, Arizona, and the Keck Observatory on Mauna Kea in Hawaii. Combined with precovery observations taken at the Samuel Oschin telescope in August 2003, and by the Near-Earth Asteroid Tracking consortium in 2001–2002, these observations allowed the accurate determination of its orbit. The calculations showed that the object was moving along a distant and highly eccentric orbit, at a distance of 90.3 AU from the Sun. Precovery images have since been found in the Palomar Digitized Sky Survey dating back to 25 September 1990.

=== Naming ===
Brown initially nicknamed Sedna "The Flying Dutchman", or "Dutch", after a legendary ghost ship, because its slow movement had initially masked its presence from his team. He eventually settled on the official name after the goddess Sedna from Inuit mythology, partly because he mistakenly thought the Inuit were the closest polar culture to his home in Pasadena, and partly because the name, unlike Quaoar, would be easily pronounceable by English speakers. Brown further justified his choice of naming by stating that the goddess Sedna's traditional location at the bottom of the Arctic Ocean reflected Sedna's large distance from the Sun. He suggested to the International Astronomical Union's (IAU) Minor Planet Center that any objects discovered in Sedna's orbital region in the future should be named after mythical entities in Arctic mythologies.

The team made the name "Sedna" public before the object had been officially numbered, which caused some controversy among the community of amateur astronomers. Brian Marsden, the head of the Minor Planet Center, stated that such an action was a violation of protocol, and that some members of the IAU might vote against it. One amateur astronomer, Reiner Stoss, unsuccessfully attempted to name one of his asteroid discoveries "Sedna" (after the singer Katy Sedna) in protest of Brown's premature naming. Despite the complaints by amateur astronomers, no objection was raised to Brown's name by members of the IAU and no competing names were suggested for Brown's object. The IAU's Committee on Small Body Nomenclature accepted the name in September 2004, and considered that, in similar cases of extraordinary interest, it might in the future allow names to be announced before they were officially numbered.

Sedna has no symbol in astronomical literature, as the usage of planetary symbols is discouraged in astronomy. Unicode includes a symbol ⟨⟩ (U+2BF2), but this is mostly used among astrologers. The symbol is a monogram of Inuktitut: ᓴᓐᓇ Sanna, the modern pronunciation of Sedna's name.

== Orbit and rotation ==
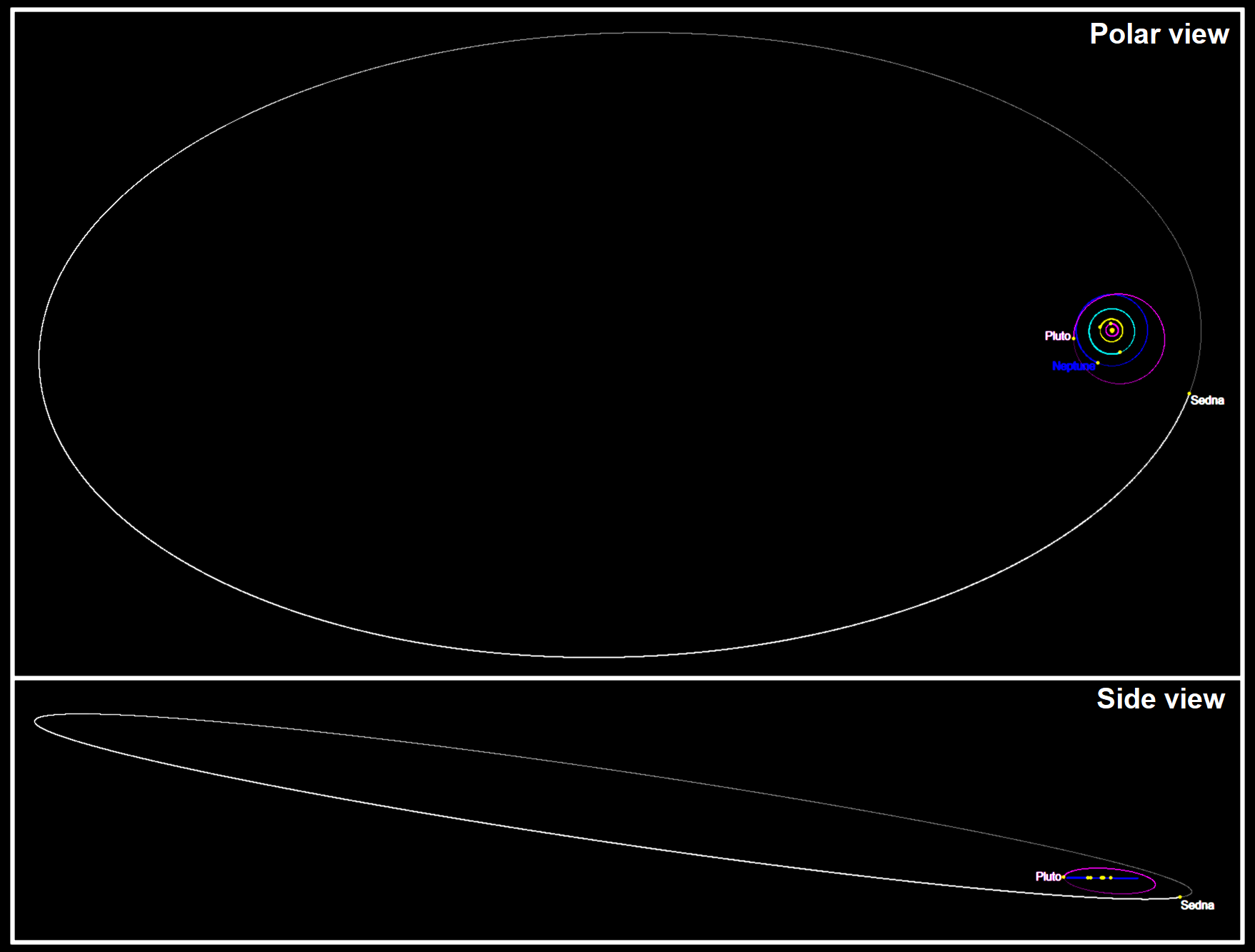
The orbit of Sedna set against the orbits of outer Solar System objects (top and side views, Pluto's orbit is purple, Neptune's is blue)

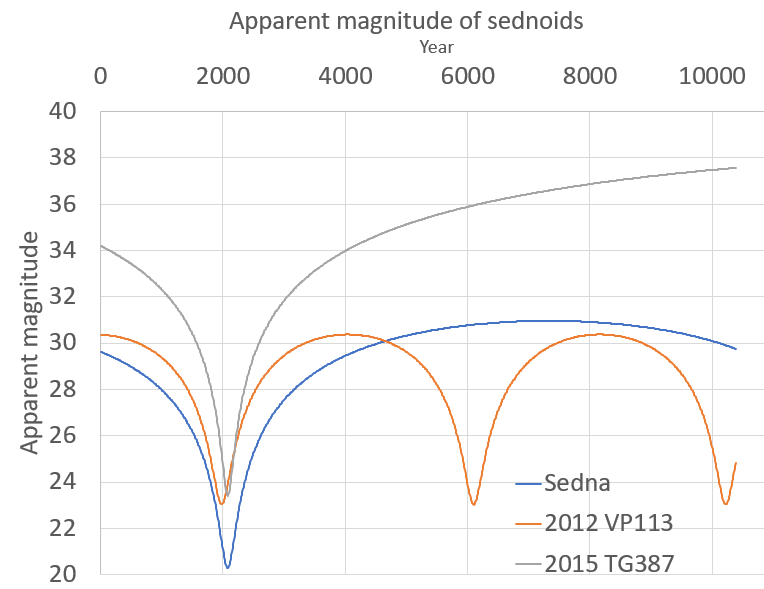
The 10,000 year apparent magnitudes of Sedna and two other sednoids

Sedna has the longest orbital period of any known object in the Solar System of its size or larger with an orbital period of around 11,400 years. Its orbit is extremely eccentric, with an aphelion of approximately 937 AU and a perihelion of 76.19 AU. Near aphelion, Sedna is one of the coldest places in the Solar System, located far past the termination shock, where temperatures never exceed −240 °C (−400.0 °F) due to its extreme distance. At aphelion, the Sun as viewed from Sedna is a particularly bright star, among the other stars, in the otherwise black sky, being about 45% as bright as the full moon as seen from Earth. Its perihelion was the largest for any known Solar System object until the discovery of the sednoid 2012 VP113. At its aphelion, Sedna orbits the Sun at a meagre 377 m/s, 1.3% that of Earth's average orbital speed.

When Sedna was first discovered, it was 89.6 AU away from the Sun, approaching perihelion, and was the most distant object in the Solar System observed. Sedna was later surpassed by Eris, which was detected by the same survey near its aphelion at 97 AU. Because Sedna is near perihelion as of 2024, both Eris and Gonggong are farther from the Sun, at 96 AU and 89 AU respectively, than Sedna at 84 AU, despite both of their semi-major axes being shorter than Sedna's. The orbits of some long-period comets extend further than that of Sedna; they are too dim to be discovered except when approaching perihelion in the inner Solar System. As Sedna nears its perihelion in mid-2076, (Note: Different programs using different epochs and/or data sets will produce slightly different dates for Sedna's perihelion as they generate instantaneous unperturbed 2-body solutions. Using a 2026 epoch, the JPL Small-Body Database has a perihelion date of 23 November 2076. Using a 1990 epoch the Lowell DES has perihelion on 2479285.9863 (14 December 2075). As of 2021, the JPL Horizons (using much more accurate numerical integration) indicates a perihelion date of 18 July 2076.) the Sun will appear merely as a very bright pinpoint in its sky, too far away to be visible as a disc to the naked eye.

When first discovered, Sedna was thought to have an unusually long rotational period (20 to 50 days). It was initially speculated that Sedna's rotation was slowed by the gravitational pull of a large binary companion, similar to Pluto's moon Charon. However, a search for such a satellite by the Hubble Space Telescope in March 2004 found no such objects. (Note: The HST search found no satellite candidates to a limit of about 500 times fainter than Sedna (Brown and Suer 2007).) Subsequent measurements from the MMT telescope showed that Sedna in reality has a much shorter rotation period of about 10 hours, more typical for a body its size. It could rotate in about 18 hours instead, but this is thought to be unlikely.

== Physical characteristics ==
Comparison of sizes, albedos, and colors of various large trans-Neptunian objects with sizes of >700 km. Sedna is shown on the middle row, third from the left. The light and dark colored arcs represent uncertainties of the object's size.

Sedna photographed in color by Apache Point Observatory's Sloan Digital Sky Survey on 11 and 12 October 2005, showing the object's slow movement across the sky

In visible light, Sedna has an absolute magnitude of about 1.8 and an estimated albedo (reflectivity) of around 0.41, which gives it a diameter of approximately 1000 km. At the time of discovery it was the brightest object found in the Solar System since Pluto in 1930. In 2004, the discoverers placed an upper limit of 1,800 km on its diameter; after observations by the Spitzer Space Telescope, this was revised downward by 2007 to less than 1,600 km. In 2012, measurements from the Herschel Space Observatory suggested that Sedna's diameter was 995 ± 80 km, which would make it smaller than Pluto's moon Charon. Australian observations of a stellar occultation by Sedna in 2013 produced similar results on its diameter, giving chord lengths 1025±135 km and 1305±565 km. The size of this object suggests it could have undergone differentiation and may have a sub-surface liquid ocean and possibly geologic activity.

As Sedna has no known moons, the direct determination of its mass is as yet impossible without either sending a space probe or perhaps locating a nearby object which is gravitationally perturbed by the dwarf planet. It is the largest trans-Neptunian Sun-orbiting object not known to have a natural satellite. As of 2024, observations from the Hubble Space Telescope in 2004 have been the only published attempt to find a satellite, and it is possible that a satellite could have been lost in the glare from Sedna itself.

Observations from the SMARTS telescope show that Sedna, in visible light, is one of the reddest objects known in the Solar System, nearly as red as Mars. Its deep red spectral slope is indicative of high concentrations of organic material on its surface. Chad Trujillo and his colleagues suggest that Sedna's dark red color is caused by an extensive surface coating of hydrocarbon sludge, termed tholins. Tholins are a reddish-colored, amorphous, and heterogeneous organic mixture hypothesized to have been transmuted from simpler organic compounds, following billions of years of continuous exposure to ultraviolet radiation, interstellar particles, and other harsh environs as the dwarf planet either comes close to the Sun or transits interstellar space. Its surface is homogeneous in color and spectrum; this may be because Sedna, unlike objects nearer the Sun, is rarely impacted by other bodies, which would expose bright patches of fresh icy material like that on 8405 Asbolus. Sedna and two other very distant objects – (308933) 2006 SQ372 and (87269) 2000 OO67 – share their color with outer classical Kuiper belt objects and the centaur 5145 Pholus, suggesting a similar region of origin.

Trujillo and colleagues have placed upper limits on Sedna's surface composition of 60% for methane ice and 70% for water ice. The presence of methane further supports the existence of tholins on Sedna's surface, as methane is among the organic compounds capable of giving rise to tholins. Barucci and colleagues compared Sedna's spectrum with that of Triton and detected weak absorption bands belonging to methane and nitrogen ices. From these observations, they suggested the following model of the surface: 24% Triton-type tholins, 7% amorphous carbon, 10% nitrogen ices, 26% methanol, and 33% methane. The detection of methane and water ice was confirmed in 2006 by the Spitzer Space Telescope mid-infrared photometry. The European Southern Observatory's Very Large Telescope observed Sedna with the SINFONI near-infrared spectrometer, finding indications of tholins and water ice on the surface.

In 2022, low-resolution near-infrared (0.7–5 μm) spectroscopic observations by the James Webb Space Telescope (JWST) revealed the presence of significant amounts of ethane ice (C_{2}H_{6}) and of complex organics on the surface of Sedna. The JWST spectra also contain evidence of the existence of small amounts of ethylene (C_{2}H_{4}), acetylene (C_{2}H_{2}) and possibly carbon dioxide (CO_{2}). On the other hand little evidence of the existence of methane (CH_{4}) and nitrogen ices was found at variance with the earlier observations.

The possible presence of nitrogen on the surface suggests that, at least for a short time, Sedna may have a tenuous atmosphere. During the 200-year portion of its orbit near perihelion, the maximum temperature on Sedna should exceed 35.6 K (−237.6 °C), the transition temperature between alpha-phase solid N_{2} and the beta-phase seen on Triton. At 38 K, the N_{2} vapor pressure would be 14 microbar (1.4 Pa). The weak methane absorption bands indicate that methane on Sedna's surface is ancient, as opposed to being freshly deposited. This finding indicates that Sedna's surface never reaches a temperature high enough for methane on the surface to evaporate and subsequently fall back as snow, which happens on Triton and probably on Pluto.

== Origin ==
In their paper announcing the discovery of Sedna, Brown and his colleagues described it as the first observed body belonging to the Oort cloud, the hypothetical cloud of comet-like objects thought to exist out to nearly a light-year from the Sun. They observed that, unlike scattered disc objects such as Eris, Sedna's perihelion (76 AU) is too distant for it to have been scattered by the gravitational influence of Neptune. Because it is considerably closer to the Sun than was expected for an Oort cloud object, and has an inclination roughly in line with the planets and the Kuiper belt, they described the dwarf planet as being an "inner Oort cloud object", situated in the disc reaching from the Kuiper belt to the spherical part of the cloud.

If Sedna formed in its current location, the Sun's original protoplanetary disc must have extended as far as 75 AU into space. On top of that, Sedna's initial orbit must have been approximately circular, otherwise its formation by the accretion of smaller bodies into a whole would not have been possible, because the large relative velocities between planetesimals would have been too disruptive. Therefore, it must have been tugged into its current eccentric orbit by a gravitational interaction with another body. In their initial paper, Brown, Rabinowitz and colleagues suggested three possible candidates for the perturbing body: an unseen planet beyond the Kuiper belt, a single passing star, or one of the young stars embedded with the Sun in the stellar cluster in which it formed.

Brown and his team favored the hypothesis that Sedna was lifted into its current orbit by a star from the Sun's birth cluster, arguing that Sedna's aphelion of about 1,000 AU, which is relatively close compared to those of long-period comets, is not distant enough to be affected by passing stars at their current distances from the Sun. They propose that Sedna's orbit is best explained by the Sun having formed in an open cluster of several stars that gradually disassociated over time. That hypothesis has also been advanced by both Alessandro Morbidelli and Scott Jay Kenyon. Computer simulations by Julio A. Fernandez and Adrian Brunini suggest that multiple close passes by young stars in such a cluster would pull many objects into Sedna-like orbits. A study by Morbidelli and Levison suggested that the most likely explanation for Sedna's orbit was that it had been perturbed by a close (approximately 800 AU) pass by another star in the first 100 million years or so of the Solar System's existence.

The trans-Neptunian planet hypothesis has been advanced in several forms by numerous astronomers, including Rodney Gomes and Patryk Lykawka. One scenario involves perturbations of Sedna's orbit by a hypothetical planetary-sized body in the inner Oort cloud. In 2006, simulations suggested that Sedna's orbital traits could be explained by perturbations of a Jupiter-mass (M_{J}) object at 5,000 AU (or less), a Neptune-mass object at 2,000 AU, or even an Earth-mass object at 1,000 AU. Computer simulations by Patryk Lykawka have indicated that Sedna's orbit may have been caused by a body roughly the size of Earth, ejected outward by Neptune early in the Solar System's formation and currently in an elongated orbit between 80 and 170 AU from the Sun. Brown's various sky surveys have not detected any Earth-sized objects out to a distance of about 100 AU. It's a possibility that such an object may have been scattered out of the Solar System after the formation of the inner Oort cloud.

Caltech researchers Konstantin Batygin and Michael Brown have hypothesized the existence of a super-Earth planet in the outer Solar System—Planet Nine—to explain the orbits of a group of extreme trans-Neptunian objects that includes Sedna. This planet would be perhaps six times as massive as Earth. It would have a highly eccentric orbit, and its average distance from the Sun would be about 15 times that of Neptune (which orbits at an average distance of 30.1 astronomical units (4.50×10^{9} km)). Accordingly, its orbital period would be approximately 7,000 to 15,000 years.

Morbidelli and Kenyon have suggested that Sedna did not originate in the Solar System, but was captured by the Sun from a passing extrasolar planetary system, specifically that of a brown dwarf about 1/20th the mass of the Sun (M_{☉}) or a main-sequence star 80 percent more massive than the Sun, which, owing to its larger mass, may now be a white dwarf. In either case, the stellar encounter had likely occurred within 100 million years after the Sun's formation. Stellar encounters during this time would have minimal effect on the Oort cloud's final mass and population since the Sun had excess material for replenishing the Oort cloud.

== Population ==
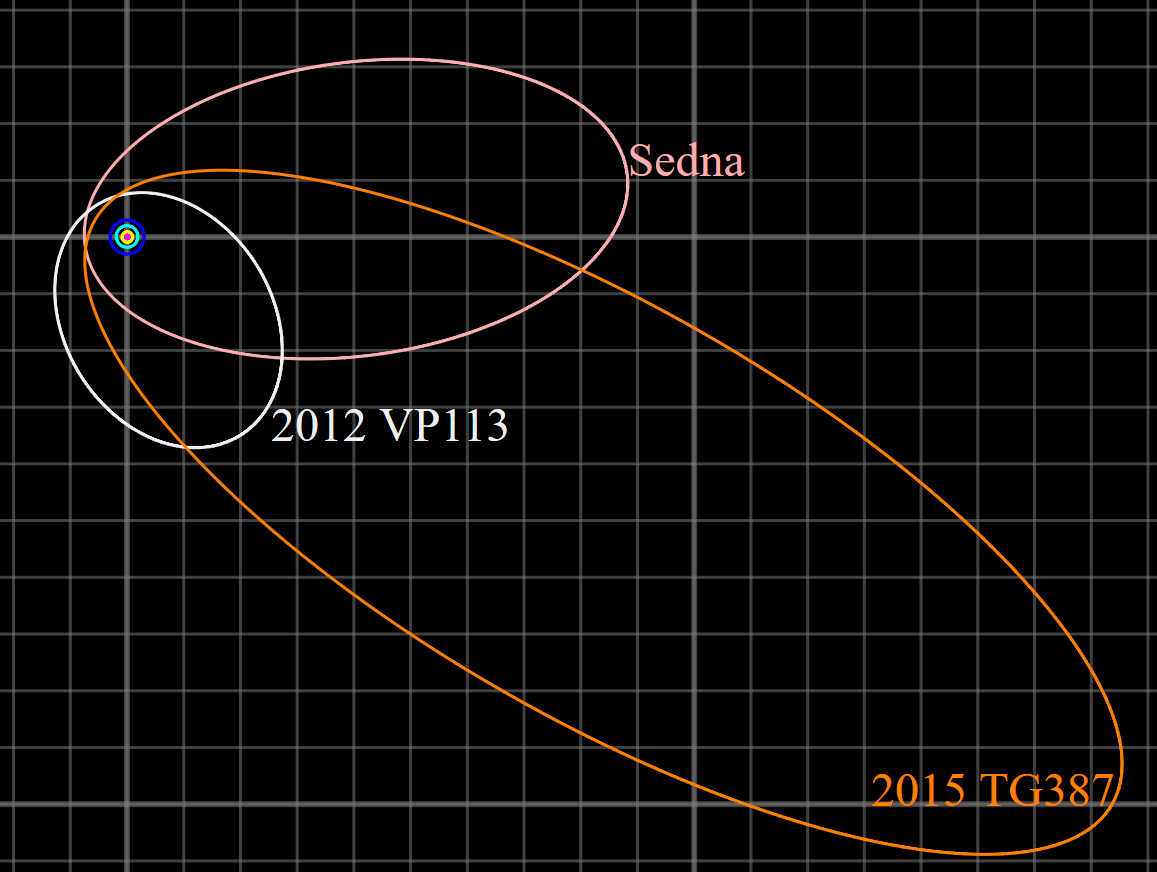
Orbit diagram of Sedna, 2012 VP113, and Leleākūhonua (2015 TG_{387}) with 100 AU grids for scale

Sedna's highly elliptical orbit, and thus a narrow temporal window for detection and observation with currently available technology, means that the probability of its detection was roughly 1 in 80. Unless its discovery were a fluke, it is expected that another 40–120 Sedna-sized objects with roughly the same orbital parameters would exist in the outer solar system.

In 2007, astronomer Megan Schwamb outlined how each of the proposed mechanisms for Sedna's extreme orbit would affect the structure and dynamics of any wider population. If a trans-Neptunian planet was responsible, all such objects would share roughly the same perihelion (about 80 AU). If Sedna was captured from another planetary system that rotated in the same direction as the Solar System, then all of its population would have orbits on relatively low inclinations and have semi-major axes ranging from 100 to 500 AU. If it rotated in the opposite direction, then two populations would form, one with low and one with high inclinations. The perturbations from passing stars would produce a wide variety of perihelia and inclinations, each dependent on the number and angle of such encounters.

A larger sample of objects with Sedna's extreme perihelion may help in determining which scenario is most likely. "I call Sedna a fossil record of the earliest Solar System", said Brown in 2006. "Eventually, when other fossil records are found, Sedna will help tell us how the Sun formed and the number of stars that were close to the Sun when it formed." A 2007–2008 survey by Brown, Rabinowitz, and Megan Schwamb attempted to locate another member of Sedna's hypothetical population. Although the survey was sensitive to movement out to 1,000 AU and discovered the likely dwarf planet Gonggong, it detected no new sednoid. Subsequent simulations incorporating the new data suggested about 40 Sedna-sized objects probably exist in this region, with the brightest being about Eris's magnitude (−1.0).

In 2014, Chad Trujillo and Scott Sheppard announced the discovery of 2012 VP113, an object half the size of Sedna, a 4,200-year orbit similar to Sedna's, and a perihelion within Sedna's range of roughly 81 AU; they speculated that this similarity of orbits may be due to the gravitational shepherding effect of a trans-Neptunian planet. Another high-perihelion trans-Neptunian object was announced by Sheppard and colleagues in 2018, provisionally designated 2015 TG_{387} and now named Leleākūhonua. With a perihelion of 65 AU and an even more distant orbit with a period of 40,000 years, its longitude of perihelion (the location where it makes its closest approach to the Sun) appears to be aligned with the directions of both Sedna and 2012 VP_{113}, strengthening the case for an apparent orbital clustering of trans-Neptunian objects suspected to be influenced by a hypothetical distant planet, dubbed Planet Nine. In a study detailing Sedna's population and Leleākūhonua's orbital dynamics, Sheppard concluded that the discovery implies a population of about 2 million inner Oort Cloud objects larger than 40 km, with a total mass in the range of 1×10^{22} kg (several times the mass of the asteroid belt and 80% the mass of Pluto).

Sedna was recovered from Transiting Exoplanet Survey Satellite data in 2020, as part of preliminary work for an all-sky survey searching for Planet Nine and other as-yet-unknown trans-Neptunian objects.

== Classification ==
The discovery of Sedna renewed the old question of just which astronomical objects ought to be considered planets, and which ones ought not to be. On 15 March 2004, articles on Sedna in the popular press reported that a tenth planet had been discovered. This question was resolved for many astronomers by applying the International Astronomical Union's definition of a planet, adopted on 24 August 2006, which mandated that a planet must have cleared the neighborhood around its orbit. Sedna is not expected to have cleared its neighborhood; quantitatively speaking, its Stern–Levison parameter is estimated to be much less than 1. (Note: The Stern–Levison parameter (Λ) as defined by Alan Stern and Harold F. Levison in 2002 determines if an object will eventually clear its orbital neighborhood of small bodies. It is defined as the object's fraction of solar mass (i.e. the object's mass divided by the Sun's mass) squared, divided by its semi-major axis to the 3/2 power, times a constant 1.7×10^{16}.^{(see equation 4)} If an object's Λ is greater than 1, then that object will eventually clear its neighborhood, and it can be considered for planethood. Using the unlikely highest estimated mass for Sedna of 2×10^{21} kg, Sedna's Λ is (2×10^{21}/1.9891×10^{30})^{2} / 519^{3/2} × 1.7×10^{16} = 1.44×10^{−6}. This is much less than 1, so Sedna is not a planet by this criterion.) The IAU also adopted dwarf planet as a term for the largest non-planets (despite the name) that, like planets, are in hydrostatic equilibrium and thus can display planet-like geological activity, yet have not cleared their orbital neighborhoods. Sedna is bright enough, and therefore large enough, that it is expected to be in hydrostatic equilibrium. Hence, astronomers generally consider Sedna a dwarf planet. The list of dwarf planets recognized by the IAU has not changed since 2006, even though Sedna is considered to be one by most astronomers.

Besides its physical classification, Sedna is also categorized according to its orbit. The Minor Planet Center, which officially catalogs the objects in the Solar System, designates Sedna only as a trans-Neptunian object (as it orbits beyond Neptune), as does the JPL Small-Body Database. The question of a more precise orbital classification has been much debated, and many astronomers have suggested that the sednoids, together with similar objects such as 2000 CR105, be placed in a new category of distant objects named extended scattered disc objects (E-SDO), detached objects, distant detached objects (DDO), or scattered-extended in the formal classification by the Deep Ecliptic Survey.

== Exploration ==
A concept mission, called TEASPOON, proposes a launch in May 2033, with a Jupiter flyby to slingshot the probe to the outer Solar System, and arrive at Sedna by June 2059, to execute a high-speed flyby of Sedna.

Sedna will come to perihelion around July 2076. This close approach to the Sun provides a window of opportunity for studying it that will not occur again for more than 11 millennia. Because Sedna spends much of its orbit beyond the heliopause, the point at which the solar wind gives way to the interstellar particle wind, examining Sedna's surface would provide unique information on the effects of interstellar radiation, as well as the properties of the solar wind at its farthest extent. It was calculated in 2011 that a flyby mission to Sedna could take 24.48 years using a Jupiter gravity assist, based on launch dates of 6 May 2033 or 23 June 2046. Sedna would be either 77.27 or 76.43 AU from the Sun when the spacecraft arrives near the end of 2057 or 2070, respectively. Other potential flight trajectories involve gravity assists from Venus, Earth, Saturn, and Neptune as well as Jupiter. Research at the University of Tennessee has also examined the potential for a lander. A 2025 study found ways to shorten the travel time. It found that a fusion rocket could carry a large spacecraft into orbit around Sedna in 10 years, while a solar sail could fly past the object in 7 years with a much smaller payload, allowing an arrival decades before perihelion.
