= (308933) 2006 SQ372 =

Trans-Neptunian object and highly eccentric centaur

(308933) 2006 SQ_{372}
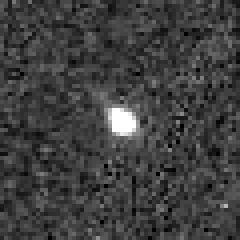
- Hubble Space Telescope image of 2006 SQ_{372} taken in 2009

Discovery
- Discovered by: A. C. Becker; A. W. Puckett; J. Kubica
- Discovery site: APO
- Discovery date: 27 September 2006

Designations
- Minor planet category: TNO · centaur · distant
- Symbol: (Astrological)

Orbital characteristics
- Epoch 23 March 2018 (JD 2458200.5)
- Uncertainty parameter 1
- Observation arc: 9.86 yr (3,602 days)
- Aphelion: 1,785.882 AU (267.1641 Tm)
- Perihelion: 24.1420436 AU (3.61159832 Tm)
- Semi-major axis: 905.0119510 AU (135.38786083 Tm)
- Eccentricity: 0.9733241
- Orbital period (sidereal): 27226 yr
- Mean anomaly: 0.1796°
- Mean motion: 0° 0^{m} 0^{s} / day
- Inclination: 19.496°
- Longitude of ascending node: 197.34°
- Argument of perihelion: 122.28°
- Neptune MOID: 1.4692 AU (219.79 Gm)

Physical characteristics
- Mean diameter: 60–140 km 122 km 124 km
- Geometric albedo: 0.08 (estimate)
- Spectral type: IR-RR; B–R = 1.62
- Absolute magnitude (H): 7.8 · 8.0

(308933) 2006 SQ_{372} is a trans-Neptunian object and highly eccentric centaur on a cometary-like orbit in the outer region of the Solar System, approximately 123 kilometers (76 miles) in diameter. It was discovered through the Sloan Digital Sky Survey by astronomers Andrew Becker, Andrew Puckett and Jeremy Kubica on images first taken on 27 September 2006 (with precovery images dated to 13 September 2005).

== Orbit ==
=== Orbital characteristics ===
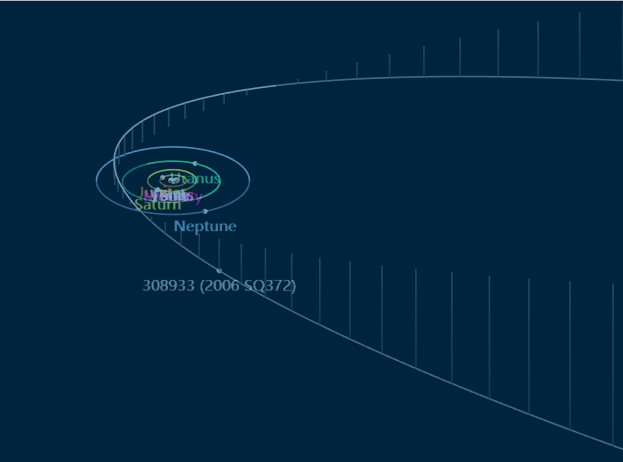
Diagram of the orbit of 2006 SQ_{372}

2006 SQ_{372} has a highly eccentric orbit, crossing that of Neptune near perihelion but bringing it more than 1,500 AU from the Sun at aphelion. It takes about 22,500 years to orbit the barycenter of the Solar System. The large semi-major axis makes it similar to (87269) 2000 OO67 and Sedna.

=== Perturbation ===
The orbit of 2006 SQ_{372} currently comes closer to Neptune than any of the other giant planets. More than half of the simulations of this object show that it gets too close to either Uranus or Neptune within the next 180 million years, sending it in a currently unknown direction. This makes it difficult to classify this object as only a centaur or a scattered disc object. The Minor Planet Center, which officially catalogues all trans-Neptunian objects, lists centaurs and SDOs together. (29981) 1999 TD10 is another such object that blurs the two categories.

Baricentric orbital elements

- aphelion (Q) = 1570 AU^{[a]} (Heliocentric 2006 AU)
- semimajor =736.67 AU^{[a]} (Heliocentric 1015 AU)
- period = 22,466 yr^{[a]} (Heliocentric 32,347 yr)

Given the extreme orbital eccentricity of this object, different epochs can generate quite different heliocentric unperturbed two-body best-fit solutions to the aphelion distance (maximum distance) of this object.^{[b]} With a 2005 epoch the object had an approximate period of about 22,000 years with aphelion at 1557 AU. But using a 2011 epoch shows a period of about 32,000 years with aphelion at 2006 AU. For objects at such high eccentricity, the Sun's barycentric coordinates are more stable than heliocentric coordinates. Using JPL Horizons with an observed orbital arc of only 2.9 years, the barycentric orbital elements for epoch 2008-May-14 generate a semi-major axis of 796 AU and a period of 22,466 years.

== Physical characteristics ==
With an absolute magnitude (H) of 8.1, it is estimated to be about 60 to 140 km in diameter. Michael Brown estimates that it has an albedo of 0.08 which would give a diameter of around 110 km. The object could possibly be a comet.

== Origin ==
The discoverers hypothesize that the object could come from the Hills cloud, but other scientists like the California Institute of Technology's Michael Brown also consider other possibilities, including the theory "it may have formed from debris just beyond Neptune [in the Kuiper belt] and been 'kicked' into its distant orbit by a planet like Neptune or Uranus".

== Comparison ==
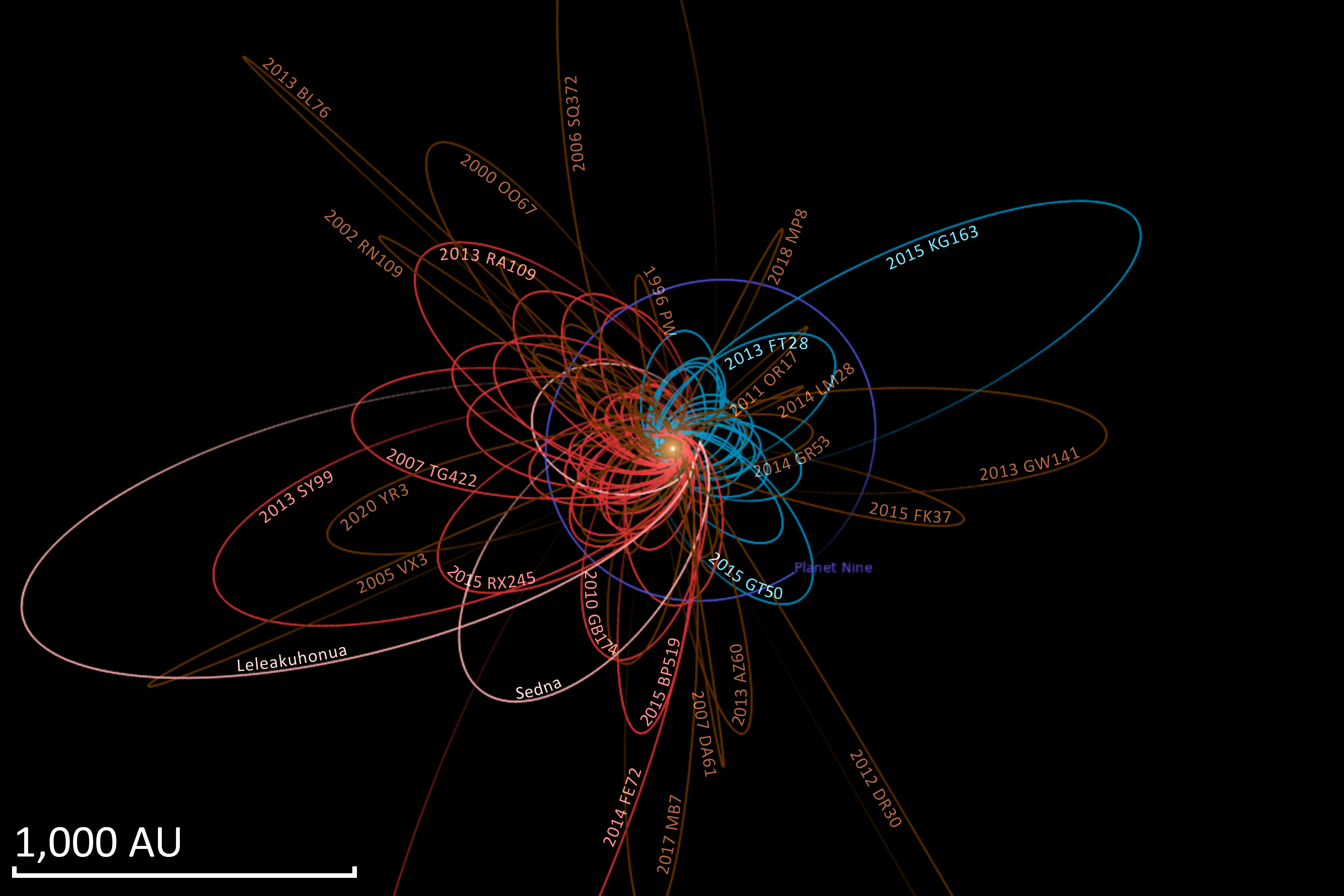
The orbits of Sedna, 2012 VP113, Leleākūhonua, and other very distant objects along with the predicted orbit of Planet Nine. The three sednoids (pink) along with the red-colored extreme trans-Neptunian object (eTNO) orbits are suspected to be aligned with the hypothetical Planet Nine while the blue-colored eTNO orbits are anti-aligned. The highly elongated orbits colored brown include centaurs and damocloids with large aphelion distances over 200 AU.

== See also ==
- (523622) 2007 TG422
- (29981) 1999 TD_{10}
- (87269) 2000 OO67
- List of Solar System objects by greatest aphelion

== Notes ==
1. Solution using the Solar System Barycenter
2. Read osculating orbit for more details about heliocentric unperturbed two-body solutions
