= Chameleon coating =

Adaptive adhesive coating

Chameleon coating, also known as nano composite tribological coating, is an adaptive adhesive that uses nanotechnology to adjust to environmental fluctuations to make living conditions more suitable to the object that the coat has been applied to.

== Purpose ==
The purpose of chameleon coating is to provide optimal performance of material in any environment. The idea is that when a sudden change in the environment occurs the particular nano coating will change its chemical properties to better suit itself in the environment in order to avoid wear due to friction and abrasion. Chameleon coating is supposed to resolve the issues with fluid hydraulics where atmospheric pressure changes under different environments. The chemical properties of fluid hydraulics alter under different atmospheric pressure because liquids and gases expand and condense under different pressures. Thus the goal of chameleon coating is to provide the same lubrication in machines from fluids such as oil but without the drawbacks of the coating or lubrication deteriorating under variable environments.

== Development ==
The beginning of chameleon coating was not always nanoscaled until recent developments in nanoengineering. Before the use of nano films (coatings), the films used to provide the beneficiary aspects of the coating would break down easier and faster due to consistent wear and tear. The use of the nano thin films helped control dislocating formation of the film and helped reduce the shear rate (rate at which the film deteriorated) due to abrasion and wear several folds over. The term “chameleon coating” was used in analogy to the actual coating of a chameleon where the coat of a chameleon is able to adapt to its environment as a defense mechanism to avoid predators and increase its chances of survival. The use of diamond-like carbon for short is generally one of the nano films used to inhibit abrasion. A possible nano film that could be used to counteract temperature changes are the pure metals Ag (silver) and Au (gold). Silver and gold can withstand high temperatures and remain soft, which is desirable for coating properties. Using a lattice matrix (a template for the coating using the basket weave design), nano engineers are able to utilize properties of the diamond-like carbons and pure metals to make chameleon coatings more adaptable at even more varied environments.

== Applications ==
The most common application for chameleon coating is in aerospace technology, where the environment is always changing due to changes in altitude. On the earth the air is humid, and temperature varies only slightly in comparison to other environments like space. The use of oil for reduced friction and wear, and lubrication applies to those ambient conditions only found on earth. When the frontier changes from atmosphere to orbit, temperatures can range from -150 °C to nearly 200 °C many of these lubrications break down at accelerated rates and thus become useless. Space satellites are under such conditions where liquid lubrication is useless as many liquid lubricants become prone to volatilization due to extremely low pressures - from nearly 100 kPa at launch, to 10 nPa in orbit. With the help of chameleon coating, the life expectancy of satellites range from 15 to about 30 years. Chameleon coatings are also often used on hypersonic and reusable launch vehicles that require lubrication in ambient atmosphere, vacuum (space), and during re-entry (high temperature). A typical multilayer coating may use a molybdenum disulfide or diamond-like carbon for low friction at ambient conditions. A layer of teflon may be used for vacuum service along with a silver or gold containing layer for high temperature lubricity.
