= Poly(hydridocarbyne) =

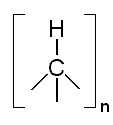

Identifiers
ChemSpider	none

Properties
Chemical formula	[HC]n
Molar mass	200,000 to 100 million daltons
Melting point	decomposes @ 100 °C
Boiling point	N/A
- Except where otherwise noted, data are given for materials in their standard state (at 25 °C [77 °F], 100 kPa). Infobox references

Poly(hydridocarbyne) (PHC) is one of a class of carbon-based random network polymers primarily composed of tetrahedrally hybridized carbon atoms, each having one hydride substituent, exhibiting the generic formula [HC]n. PHC is made from bromoform, a liquid halocarbon that is commercially manufactured from methane. At room temperature, poly(hydridocarbyne) is a dark brown powder. It can be easily dissolved in a number of solvents (tetrahydrofuran, ether, toluene etc.), forming a colloidal suspension that is clear and non-viscous, which may then be deposited as a film or coating on various substrates. Upon thermolysis in argon at atmospheric pressure and temperatures of 110 °C to 1000 °C, decomposition of poly(hydridocarbyne) results in hexagonal diamond (lonsdaleite).

More recently poly(hydridocarbyne) has been synthesized by a much simpler method using electrolysis of chloroform (May 2008) and hexachloroethane (June 2009).

The novelty of PHC (and its related polymer poly(methylsilyne)) is that the polymer may be readily fabricated into various forms (e.g. films, fibers, plates) and then thermolyzed into a final hexagonal diamond ceramic.

== See also ==
- Carbyne, for name origin
