= Lonsdaleite =

Hexagonal lattice allotrope of carbon

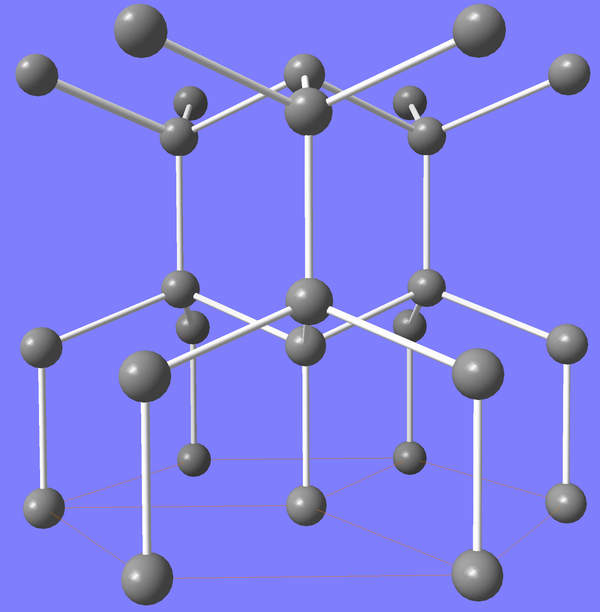
- Crystal structure of lonsdaleite

General
- Category: Minerals
- Formula: C
- IMA symbol: Lon
- Strunz classification: 1.CB.10b
- Crystal system: Hexagonal
- Crystal class: Dihexagonal dipyramidal (6/mmm); H-M symbol: (6/m 2/m 2/m)
- Space group: P6_{3}/mmc
- Unit cell: a = 2.51 Å, c = 4.12 Å; Z = 4

Structure
- Jmol (3D): Interactive image

Identification
- Color: Gray in crystals, pale yellowish to brown in broken fragments
- Crystal habit: Cubes in fine-grained aggregates
- Mohs scale hardness: 7–8 (for impure specimens)
- Luster: Adamantine
- Diaphaneity: Transparent
- Specific gravity: 3.2
- Optical properties: Uniaxial (+/−)
- Refractive index: n = 2.404

Lonsdaleite (named in honour of Kathleen Lonsdale), also called hexagonal diamond in reference to the crystal structure, is an allotrope of carbon with a hexagonal lattice, as opposed to the cubical lattice of conventional diamond. It is found in nature in meteorite debris; when meteors containing graphite strike the Earth, the immense heat and stress of the impact transforms the graphite into diamond, but retains graphite's hexagonal crystal lattice. Lonsdaleite was first identified in 1967 from the Canyon Diablo meteorite, where it occurs as microscopic crystals mixed in with ordinary diamond.

It is translucent and brownish-yellow and has an index of refraction of 2.40–2.41 and a specific gravity of 3.2–3.3. Its hardness is theoretically superior to that of cubic diamond (up to 58% more), according to computational simulations, but natural specimens exhibited somewhat lower hardness through a large range of values (from 7–8 on Mohs hardness scale). The cause is speculated to be due to the samples having been riddled with lattice defects and impurities.

In addition to meteorite deposits, hexagonal diamond has been synthesized in the laboratory (1966 or earlier; published in 1967) by compressing and heating graphite either in a static press or using explosives, albeit in fragmentary state. The first bulk synthesis of hexagonal diamond in pure form was reported in 2025.

== Hardness ==
According to the conventional interpretation of the results of examining the meagre samples collected from meteorites or manufactured in the lab, lonsdaleite has a hexagonal unit cell, related to the diamond unit cell in the same way that the hexagonal and cubic close packed crystal systems are related. Its diamond structure can be considered to be made up of interlocking rings of six carbon atoms, in the chair conformation. In lonsdaleite, some rings are in the boat conformation instead. At nanoscale dimensions, cubic diamond is represented by diamondoids while hexagonal diamond is represented by wurtzoids.

In diamond, all the carbon-to-carbon bonds, both within a layer of rings and between them, are in the staggered conformation, thus causing all four cubic-diagonal directions to be equivalent; whereas in lonsdaleite the bonds between layers are in the eclipsed conformation, which defines the axis of hexagonal symmetry.

Mineralogical simulation predicts lonsdaleite to be 58% harder than diamond on the <100> face, and to resist indentation pressures of 152 GPa, whereas diamond would break at 97 GPa. This is yet exceeded by IIa (the purest natural) diamond's <111> tip hardness of 167 GPa.

The extrapolated properties of lonsdaleite have been questioned in 2014, particularly its superior hardness, since specimens under crystallographic inspection have not shown a bulk hexagonal lattice structure, but instead a conventional cubic diamond dominated by structural defects that include hexagonal sequences. A 2015 quantitative analysis of the X-ray diffraction data of lonsdaleite has shown that about equal amounts of hexagonal and cubic stacking sequences are present. Consequently, it has been suggested that "stacking disordered diamond" is the most accurate structural description of lonsdaleite. On the other hand, 2016–2017 shock experiments with in situ X-ray diffraction show strong evidence for creation of relatively pure lonsdaleite in dynamic high-pressure environments comparable to meteorite impacts.

In 2025, Chinese scientists measured the material properties of their bulk-synthesized lonsdaleite. It has an asymptotic (at 9.8 N) Vickers hardness of 114±6.4 GPa along the axial direction and 106±5.7 GPa along the radial direction, which is comparable to that of natural diamond (about 110 Gpa on the {100} plane). Using ultrasound the Young's modulus was measured at 1229±15 GPa, and the shear modulus at 516±18 GPa, slightly higher than that of single-crystal (100) cubic diamond. This confirms that lonsdaleite is stiffer than cubic diamond.

== Chemical properties ==
Hexagonal diamond starts oxidizing at 1,121 K (848 °C; 1,558 °F), which is higher than that of other diamond types.

== Occurrence ==
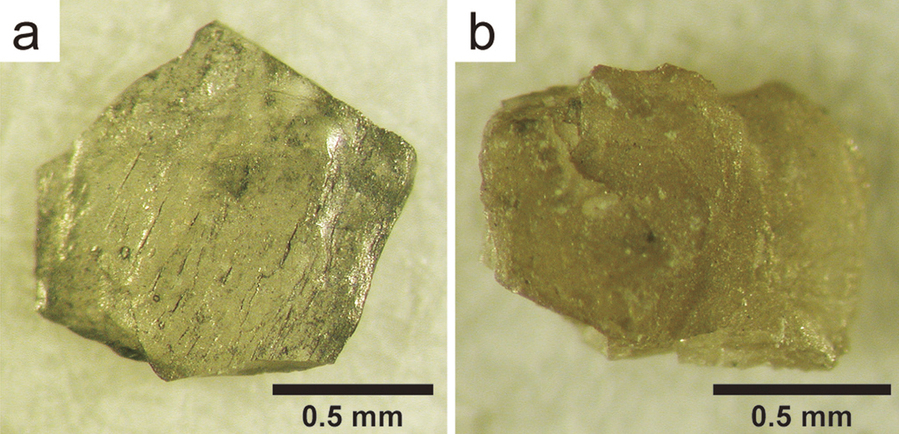
Diamond samples from the Popigai impact structure: (a) is pure diamond, while (b) is diamond with some lonsdaleite impurities.

Lonsdaleite occurs as microscopic crystals associated with diamond in several meteorites: Canyon Diablo, Kenna, and Allan Hills 77283. It is also naturally occurring in non-bolide diamond placer deposits in the Sakha Republic. Claims of Lonsdaleite and other nanodiamonds in a layer of the Greenland ice sheet that could be of Younger Dryas age have not been confirmed and are now disputed. Lonsdaleite was found in local peat deposits is claimed as evidence for the Tunguska event being caused by a meteor.

== Manufacture ==
In addition to laboratory synthesis by compressing and heating graphite either in a static press or using explosives, lonsdaleite has also been produced by chemical vapor deposition, and also by the thermal decomposition of a polymer, poly(hydridocarbyne), at atmospheric pressure, under argon atmosphere, at 1,000 °C (1,832 °F).

In 2020, researchers at Australian National University found by accident they were able to produce lonsdaleite at room temperatures using a diamond anvil cell.

In 2019 and 2020, some Italian researchers, journalists, and a professor of Classics at the University of Bologna argued in books, on television, and in newspapers that hexagonal diamond had been found in the carbon ink used on a papyrus manuscript, claiming that this proved the ink had been produced by a 19th-century forger, Constantine Simonides. After 2020, no one returned to these claims.

In 2021, Washington State University's Institute for Shock Physics published a paper stating that they created lonsdaleite crystals large enough to measure their stiffness, confirming that they are stiffer than common cubic diamonds. However, the explosion used to create these crystals also destroys them nanoseconds later, providing just enough time to measure stiffness with lasers.

In July 2025, Chinese researchers reported the successful synthesis of high-purity lonsdaleite crystals, ranging from micrometre to millimetre in size, by compressing ultrapure graphite single crystals under precisely controlled high-pressure, high-temperature, and quasi-hydrostatic conditions. The work, published in Nature, is regarded as the first clear laboratory production of bulk hexagonal diamond, which is predicted to have greater hardness and thermal stability than conventional cubic diamond.

== Scams ==
Since the characteristics of lonsdaleite are unknown to most people outside of scientists trained in geology and mineralogy, the names "lonsdaleite" and "hexagonal diamond" have frequently been used in the fraudulent sale of ceramic artifacts passed off as meteorites on online e-commerce sites and at street fairs and street markets, with prices ranging from a few dollars to thousands of dollars.

== See also ==
- Aggregated diamond nanorod – Nanocrystalline form of diamond
- Glossary of meteoritics
- List of minerals
- List of minerals named after people
