= Persoz pendulum =

Persoz pendulum

A Persoz pendulum is a device used for measuring hardness of materials. The instrument consists of a pendulum which is free to swing on two balls resting on a coated test panel. The pendulum hardness test is based on the principle that the amplitude of the pendulum's oscillation will decrease more quickly when supported on a softer surface. The hardness of any given coating is given by the number of oscillations made by the pendulum within the specified limits of amplitude determined by accurately positioned photo sensors. An electronic counter records the number of swings made by the pendulum

== Construction ==
Persoz pendulum device

The pendulum consists of balls which rest on the coating under test and form the fulcrum. The Persoz pendulum is very similar to the Konig pendulum. Both employ the same principle, that is the softer the coating the more the pendulum oscillations are damped and the shorter the time needed for the amplitude of oscillation to be reduced by a specified amount. The two pendulums differ in shape, mass and oscillation time, and there is no general relationship between the results obtained using the two pieces of equipment. In either case, the test simply involves noting the time in seconds for the amplitude of swing to decrease from either 6 to 3 degrees (Konig pendulum) or 12 to 4 degrees (Persoz pendulum).
