= Nanoneedle =

Needles in the nanometer size range

Nanoneedles may be conical or tubular needles in the nanometre size range, made from silicon or boron-nitride with a central bore of sufficient size to allow the passage of large molecules, or solid needles useful in Raman spectroscopy, light-emitting diodes (LED) and laser diodes.

== Usage ==
=== Impalefection ===
In 2005, the Research Institute for Cell Engineering at Japan's National Institute of Advanced Industrial Science and Technology (AIST) and Tokyo University of Agriculture and Technology used nanoneedles controlled by an atomic force microscope (AFM) to penetrate the nucleus of living cells and insert molecules of nucleic acid, proteins or possibly to carry out cell surgery. The technique can accurately establish the position of the needle by monitoring the force exerted. Cells to be used for tracking, diagnosing, and treatment of illness may be removed from the body and replaced after being injected. The 100 nm diameter needles were cut from silicon AFM tips using focused ion-beam etching.

In 2009, researchers at the University of Illinois produced a 50 nm diameter boron-nitride nanoneedle with a thin coating of gold, suitable for biophysical research. Its diameter allows easy penetration of cell walls in order to deliver organic matter or fluorescent quantum dots into the cytoplasm or the nucleus. It may also be used as electrochemical probe or optical biosensor in a cellular environment.

=== Atomic Force Microscopy ===
The University of California, Berkeley in 2008 produced gallium arsenide (GaAs) nanoneedles which emit extremely bright light, though not yet lasers, when optically pumped. With a length of 3–4 micrometres, they taper to tips of 2–5 nm across. In addition to optoelectronic devices, the needles will be useful in atomic force microscopy (AFM), and can be easily grown in arrays. Such AFM arrays, besides producing near-atomic resolution images of surfaces, could lead to new forms of data storage by direct manipulation of atoms. The needles may also find a use in tip-enhanced Raman spectroscopy, a process in which molecular energy levels are measured by comparing the frequency of incident light with that of outgoing light. A sharp needle tip allows for a more precise examination of the sample, down perhaps to that of single molecules.

=== Biomedical research ===
Research at the department of NanoMedicine and Biomedical Engineering at the University of Texas in 2010 created a new type of nanoneedle using silicon. A solution of hydrogen peroxide produces porous needles – their porosity is controlled along their length by altering the concentration of peroxide over time. The coloured porous needles are constructed to biodegrade over a predictable period, and have a surface area 120 times that of equivalent solid wires, making them useful as drug-delivery vehicles. Since porous silicon does not harm cells, the needles may also be used to tag cells and monitor chemical reactions.

== Ethical considerations ==
A note of caution was sounded by Martin A. Philbert, professor of toxicology at the University of Michigan, Ann Arbor. "The ability to manipulate nanometer-scale materials at the molecular level holds the promise of conferring specificity of cellular delivery and the reduction of collateral nuisance injury to neighboring cells. In the context of environmental health, the scientific community will have to pay close attention to those physicochemical properties of engineered nanomaterials that defeat or circumvent normal cellular processes and lend themselves to indiscriminate penetration of biological barriers, tissues, and cellular systems."
