= Point plotting =

Point plotting is an elementary mathematical skill required in analytic geometry. Invented by René Descartes and originally used to locate positions on military maps, this skill is now assumed of everyone who wants to locate grid on any map, for example, 7A.

Using point plotting, one associates an ordered pair of real numbers (x, y) with a point in the plane in a one-to-one manner. As a result, one obtains the 2-dimensional Cartesian coordinate system.

To be able to plot points, one needs to first decide on a point in plane which will be called the origin, and a couple of perpendicular lines, called the x and y axes, as well as a preferred direction on each of the lines. Usually one chooses the x axis pointing right and the y axis pointing up, and these will be named the positive directions. Also, one picks a segment in the plane which is declared to be of unit length. Using rotated versions of this segment, one can measure distances along the x and y axes.

Having the origin and the axes in place, given a pair (x, y) of real numbers, one considers the point on the x axis at distance |x| from the origin and along the positive direction if x≥0, and the other direction otherwise. In the same way one picks the point on the y axis corresponding to the number y. The line parallel to the y axis going through the first point and the line parallel to the x axis going through the second point will intersect at precisely one point, which will be called the point with coordinates (x, y).

== See also ==
- Cartesian coordinate system
- Graph of a function
