= (87269) 2000 OO67 =

Trans-Neptunian object

(87269) 2000 OO_{67}
Discovery
- Discovered by: Cerro Tololo Obs.
- Discovery site: Cerro Tololo Obs.
- Discovery date: 29 July 2000

Designations
- Minor planet category: TNO · centaur (DES)

Orbital characteristics
- Epoch 13 January 2016 (JD 2457400.5)
- Uncertainty parameter 2
- Observation arc: 2187 days (5.99 yr)
- Earliest precovery date: 29 July 2000
- Aphelion: 1,041.743 AU (155.8425 Tm)
- Perihelion: 20.7305754 AU (3.10124994 Tm)
- Semi-major axis: 531.2369251 AU (79.47191283 Tm)
- Eccentricity: 0.9609768
- Orbital period (sidereal): 11760.29 yr (4295446.2 d)
- Average orbital speed: 0.88 km/s
- Mean anomaly: 0.328967°
- Mean motion: 0° 0^{m} 0.302^{s} / day
- Inclination: 20.0729°
- Longitude of ascending node: 142.391°
- Argument of perihelion: 212.345°
- Uranus MOID: 1.82 AU (0.272 Tm)
- T_{Jupiter}: 5.265

Physical characteristics
- Mean diameter: 64 km (est. at 0.09)
- Temperature: ~12 K
- Absolute magnitude (H): 9.2

(87269) 2000 OO_{67} is a trans-Neptunian object, approximately 64 kilometers (40 miles) in diameter, on a highly eccentric orbit in the outermost region of the Solar System. It was discovered by astronomers at the Chilean Cerro Tololo Inter-American Observatory on 29 July 2000.

== Description ==
At aphelion it is over 1,000 AU from the Sun and, with a perihelion of 21 AU, almost crosses the orbit of Uranus at closest approach. Astronomers with the Deep Ecliptic Survey classify it as a centaur rather than a trans-Neptunian object. 2000 OO_{67} came to perihelion in April 2005.

== Comparison ==
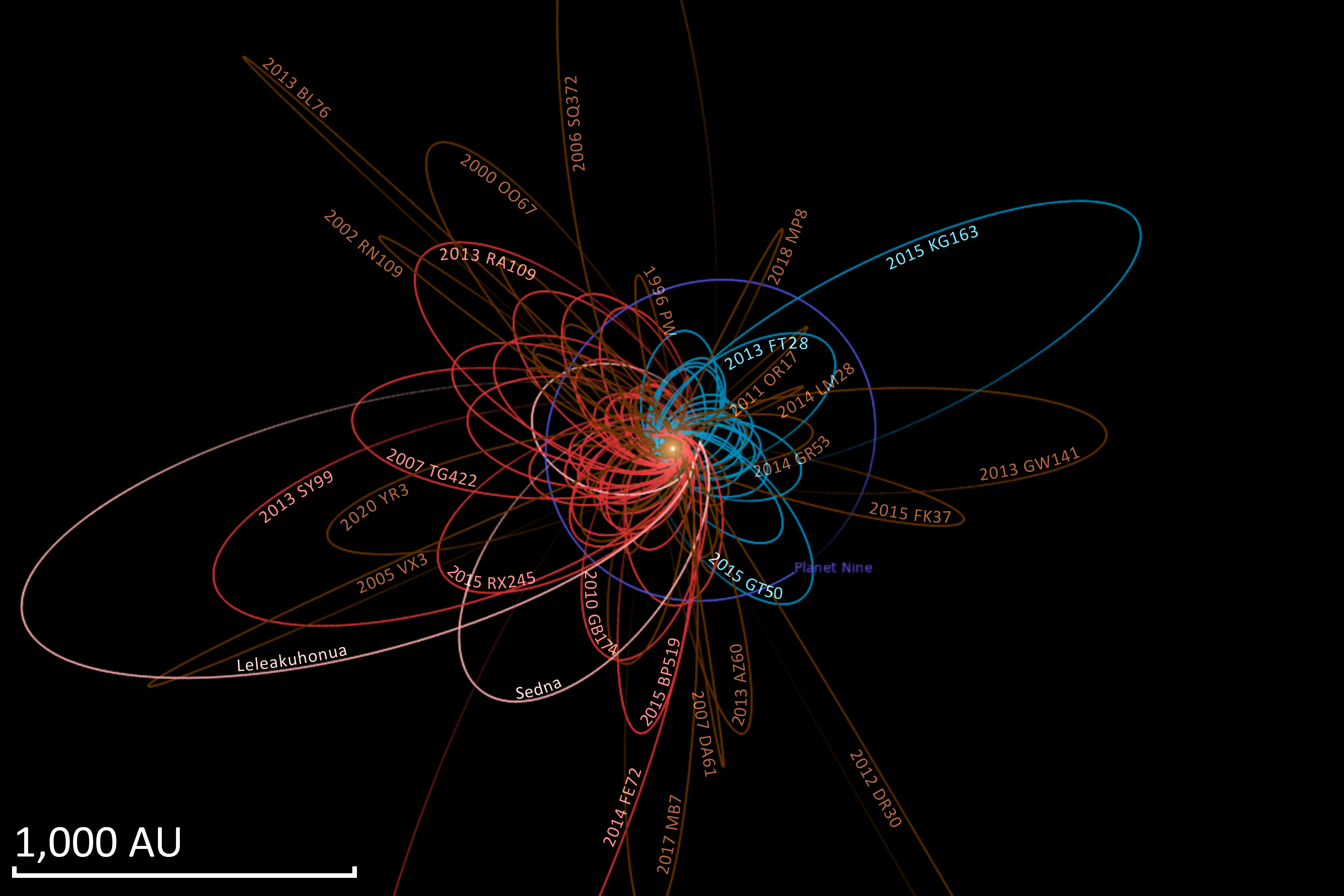
The orbits of Sedna, 2012 VP113, Leleākūhonua, and other very distant objects along with the predicted orbit of Planet Nine. The three sednoids (pink) along with the red-colored extreme trans-Neptunian object (eTNO) orbits are suspected to be aligned with the hypothetical Planet Nine while the blue-colored eTNO orbits are anti-aligned. The highly elongated orbits colored brown include centaurs and damocloids with large aphelion distances over 200 AU.

== See also ==
- 2005 VX3
- (308933) 2006 SQ372
- (523622) 2007 TG422
- TAU (spacecraft) (probe designed to go 1000 AU in 50 years)
- List of Solar System objects by greatest aphelion
