= HD 106906 b =

Exoplanet in the constellation Crux

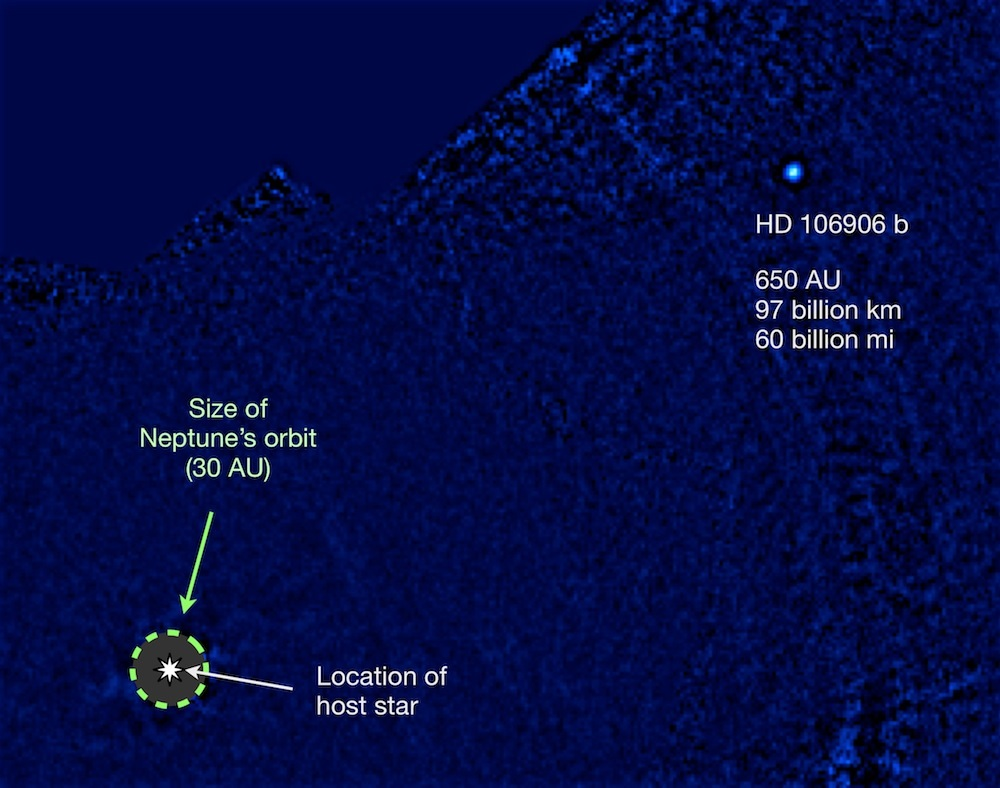
- The star HD 106906 and the planet HD 106906 b, with Neptune's orbit for comparison

Discovery
- Discovered by: Vanessa Bailey, et al.
- Discovery site: Magellan Telescopes at the Las Campanas Observatory in Chile
- Discovery date: December 4, 2013 (published)
- Detection method: Direct imaging

Orbital characteristics
- Semi-major axis: 850+560 −260 AU
- Eccentricity: 0.44+0.28 −0.31
- Orbital period (sidereal): 15,000+17,000 −6,400
- Inclination: 56°+12° −21°
- Star: HD 106906

Physical characteristics
- Mean radius: 1.56+0.04 −0.05 R_{J}
- Mass: 11±2 M_{Jup}
- Temperature: ≈1,800 K (1,500 °C; 2,800 °F)

HD 106906 b is a directly imaged planetary-mass companion and exoplanet orbiting the star HD 106906, in the constellation Crux at about 336 ± 13 light-years (103 ± 4 pc) from Earth. It is estimated to be about eleven times the mass of Jupiter and is located about 738 AU away from its host star. HD 106906 b is an oddity; while its mass estimate is nominally consistent with identifying it as an exoplanet, it appears at a much wider separation from its parent star than thought possible for in-situ formation from a protoplanetary disk.

== Description ==
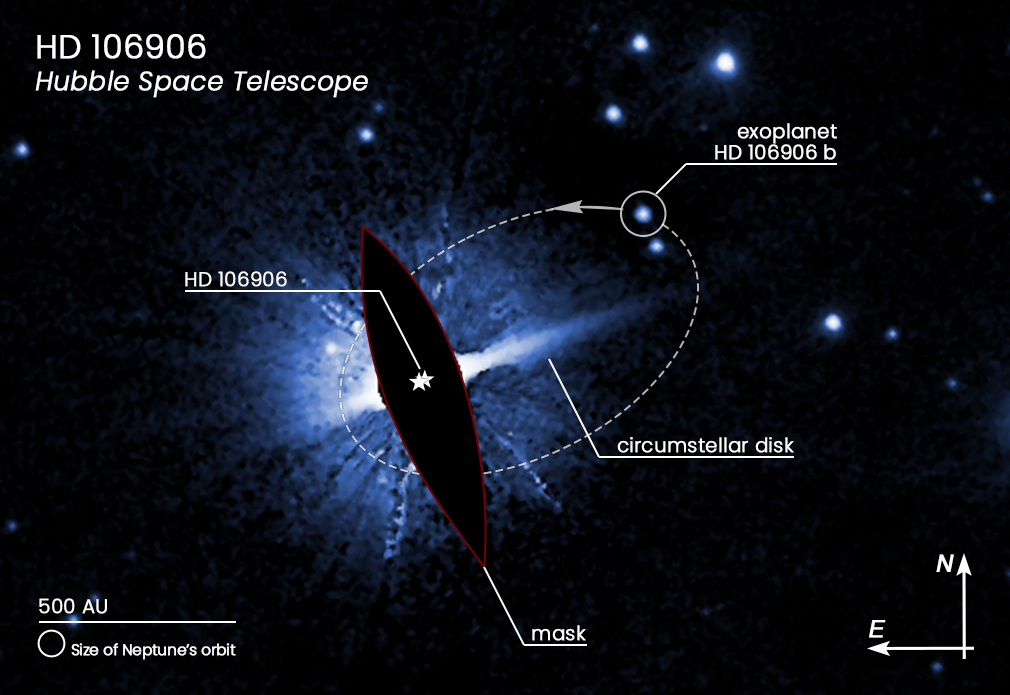
A possible orbit of the 11 M_{J} exoplanet HD 106906 b

HD 106906 b is the only known companion orbiting HD 106906, a spectroscopic binary star composed of two F5V main-sequence stars with a combined mass of 2.71 M_{☉}. Based on the star's luminosity and temperature, the system is estimated to be about 13±2 million years old. The system is a likely member of the Scorpius–Centaurus association. The star is surrounded by a debris disk oriented 21 degrees away from HD 106906 b; this disk is about 65 AU (10 billion km; 6 billion mi) from the binary on its interior and ranges asymmetrically from approximately 120 to 550 AU (18 to 82 billion km; 11 to 51 billion mi) from the binary at its outer edge. Based on its near-infrared spectral-energy distribution, its age, and relevant evolutionary models, HD 106906 b is estimated to be 11±2 M_{Jup}, with a surface temperature of 1,800 K (1,500 °C; 2,800 °F). A spectrum with Magellan does show a spectral type of L2.5 ±1 and intermediate gravity. A high-signal-to-noise spectrum was taken with VLT/SINFONI, which resulted in a spectral type of L1.5 ± 1.0 and a temperature of 1820 ± 240 K. Depending on its formation it has a mass of 11.9+1.7
−0.8 M_{J} (hot start) or 14.0+0.2
−0.5 M_{J} (cold start). The high surface temperature, a relic of its recent formation, gives it a luminosity of about 0.02% of the Sun's. While its mass and temperature are similar to other planetary-mass companions/exoplanets like beta Pictoris b or 1RXS J160929.1−210524 b, its projected separation from the star is much larger, about 738 AU (110 billion km; 69 billion mi), (Note: This distance is about 24.5 times the separation of Neptune from the Sun, or about 3/4 that of Sedna at aphelion.) giving it one of the widest orbits of any currently known planetary-mass companions.

The discovery team evaluated the possibility that HD 106906 b is not gravitationally bound to HD 106906, but is seen close to it along our line of sight and moving in the same direction by chance. The odds of such a coincidence were found to be less than 0.01%.

== Discovery ==
Observation of star HD 106906 began in 2005, utilizing the Magellan Telescopes at the Las Campanas Observatory in the Atacama Desert of Chile, some eight years before the companion was discovered. The initial interest in HD 106906 A was directed largely to the debris disk surrounding the star, a pre-main-sequence member of Lower Centaurus–Crux. On December 4, 2013, University of Arizona graduate student Vanessa Bailey, leader of an international team of astronomers, detailed the discovery of HD 106906 b with a paper first published as a preprint on the arXiv and later as a refereed article in The Astrophysical Journal Letters.

== Possible formation mechanism ==
The discovery team and astronomers worldwide were puzzled by HD 106906 b's extreme separation from its host star, because it is not considered possible that a star's protoplanetary disk could be extensive enough to permit formation of gas giants at such a distance. To account for the separation, it is theorized that the companion formed independently from its star as part of a binary system. This proposal is somewhat problematic in that the mass ratio of ~140:1 is not in the range expected from this process; binary stars typically do not exceed a ratio of 10:1. This is still considered preferable, however, to the alternate theory that the companion formed closer to its primary and then was scattered to its present distance by gravitational interaction with another orbital object. This second companion would need to have a mass greater than that of HD 106906 b, and the discovery team found no such object beyond 35 AU from the primary. Additionally, the scattering process would have likely disrupted the protoplanetary disk.

Subsequently, astronomer Paul Kalas and colleagues discovered that Hubble Space Telescope images show a highly asymmetric shape to the debris disk beyond a radius of 200 AU, supporting the hypothesis of a dynamical upheaval that involved the planet and another perturber, such as a second planet in the system or a close encounter with a passing star. One theory modeled the planet as originating in a disk close to the central binary, migrating inward to an unstable resonance with the binary, and then evolving rapidly to a highly eccentric orbit. The planet would be ejected unless its periastron distance was increased away from the binary, such as by a gravitational encounter with a passing star during apastron. An analysis of the motions of 461 nearby stars using Gaia observations revealed two (HIP 59716 and HIP 59721, a possible loosely bound binary system) that passed within 1 pc (3.3 ly) of HD 106906 between 2 and 3 million years ago. These stars, however, likely had a closest passage far too distant to significantly interfere in the debris disk or the companion.

The first orbit for the planet was determined in 2020, finding a semi-major axis of 850 astronomical units, an orbital period of 15,000 years, an eccentricity of 0.44, and an orbital inclination relative to HD 106906's debris disk of 36 or 40°. These parameters are similar to the estimated for the hypothetical Planet Nine. These measurements were consistent with the hypothesis that HD 106906 b formed in the protoplanetary disk, being ejected by dynamical interactions and stabilized by nearby stars, or that it was captured by another star, or as a rogue planet.

Polarimetric observations published in 2021 found that the debris disk has an asymmetrical shape and is unusually eccentric. Planet-disk interactions are likely to blame, suggesting that HD 106906 b likely formed in an inner orbit and was ejected.

A subsequent 2021 found that the rotational axis of HD 106906 b is misaligned with both its orbit around the binary and possibly with the circumstellar disk. These misaligments point to a formation through gravitational instability, either in a circumstellar disk or a molecular cloud, since formation through either mechanism would naturally result in a randomly oriented spin axis. The planet may have formed in situ or as a captured rogue planet. Thus, the formation of HD 106906 b would be similar to that of stars.

The formation mechanism was re-evaluated in a 2023 publication. In situ formation (i.e. with the current orbital elements) was rejected, as HD 106906 b's inclined orbit would introduce a warp the debris disk which is not observed. They proposed a formation scenario where the planet formed in an orbit aligned with the debris disk, but was inclined after an encounter with a rogue planet.

Using archival spectral data a team found a C/O=0.53+0.15
−0.25 for HD 106906 b, consistent with the stellar association its host star formed in. This is consistent with stellar-like formation for the companion. This makes it unlikely that it formed like a planet in a disk around the binary.

== Public reaction ==
In 2009, IAU stated that it had no plans to assign names to extrasolar planets, considering it impractical. However, in August 2013 the IAU changed its stance, inviting members of the public to suggest names for exoplanets.

A petition had been launched asking the International Astronomical Union (IAU) to name the companion Gallifrey, after the homeworld of The Doctor on the British science fiction series Doctor Who. The petition gathered over 139,000 signatures. In January 2014, however, it was agreed by the IAU not to accept the petition's goal to name it Gallifrey, as the petition did not follow the public policy of the IAU that a discussion between the public and IAU should be started before naming any spatial entity, and that this policy was not respected.

== See also ==
- DT Virginis, a planetary mass object which orbits a binary star, it has the farthest known orbit of a known circumbinary object
- GU Piscium b, an exoplanet orbiting GU Piscium at a distance of 2000 AU and period of 80,000 years in the AB Doradus moving group
- Gliese 900 b, a planetary mass object with the widest discovered orbit
