= (505478) 2013 UT15 =

Extreme trans-Neptunian object

(505478) 2013 UT_{15}
Discovery
- Discovered by: OSSOS
- Discovery site: Mauna Kea Obs.
- Discovery date: 2 August 2013

Designations
- Alternative designations: o3L83
- Minor planet category: TNO · SDO detached · distant

Orbital characteristics
- Epoch 4 September 2017 (JD 2458000.5)
- Uncertainty parameter 4
- Observation arc: 4.08 yr (1,489 days)
- Aphelion: 347.97 AU
- Perihelion: 43.853 AU
- Semi-major axis: 195.91 AU
- Eccentricity: 0.7762
- Orbital period (sidereal): 2742.19 yr (1,001,586 days)
- Mean anomaly: 353.50°
- Mean motion: 0° 0^{m} 1.44^{s} / day
- Inclination: 10.682°
- Longitude of ascending node: 191.97°
- Argument of perihelion: 252.40°

Physical characteristics
- Dimensions: 243 km estimate); 260 km (est. at 0.08); 340 km estimate)
- Geometric albedo: 0.04 (estimate); 0.09 (assumed)
- Spectral type: BB (estimate)
- Absolute magnitude (H): 6.2951 · 6.4

(505478) 2013 UT_{15} is an extreme trans-Neptunian object from the scattered disc, located in the outermost regions of the Solar System, approximately 260 kilometers (160 miles) in diameter. It was discovered on 2 August 2013, by astronomers of the Outer Solar System Origins Survey at Mauna Kea Observatory, Hawaii, United States.

== Orbit ==
With a semi-major axis of 196 AU, 2013 UT_{15} orbits the Sun at a distance of 43.9–348 AU once every 2,742 years. Its orbit has an eccentricity of 0.78 and an inclination of 11° with respect to the ecliptic. It has a similar orbit to (148209) 2000 CR105, except for a smaller inclination.

2013 UT_{15} belongs to a small number of detached objects with perihelion distances of 30 AU or more, and semi-major axes of 150 AU or more. Such objects can not reach such orbits without some perturbing object, which leads to the speculation of Planet Nine.

== Physical characteristics ==
=== Spectral type ===
The object is estimated to have a bluish spectra (BB).

=== Diameter ===
2013 UT_{15} has been estimated to measure 243 and 340 kilometers in diameter, based on an assumed albedo of 0.09 and 0.04, respectively. A generic magnitude-to-diameter conversion gives a mean-diameter of 260 kilometers, using a typical albedo of 0.08 and a published absolute magnitude of 6.2951.

== Numbering and naming ==
2013 UT_{15} was numbered (505478) by the Minor Planet Center on 4 November 2017 (M.P.C. 107067). As of 2025, this minor planet has not received a name.
