= Planet Nine =

Hypothetical Solar System planet

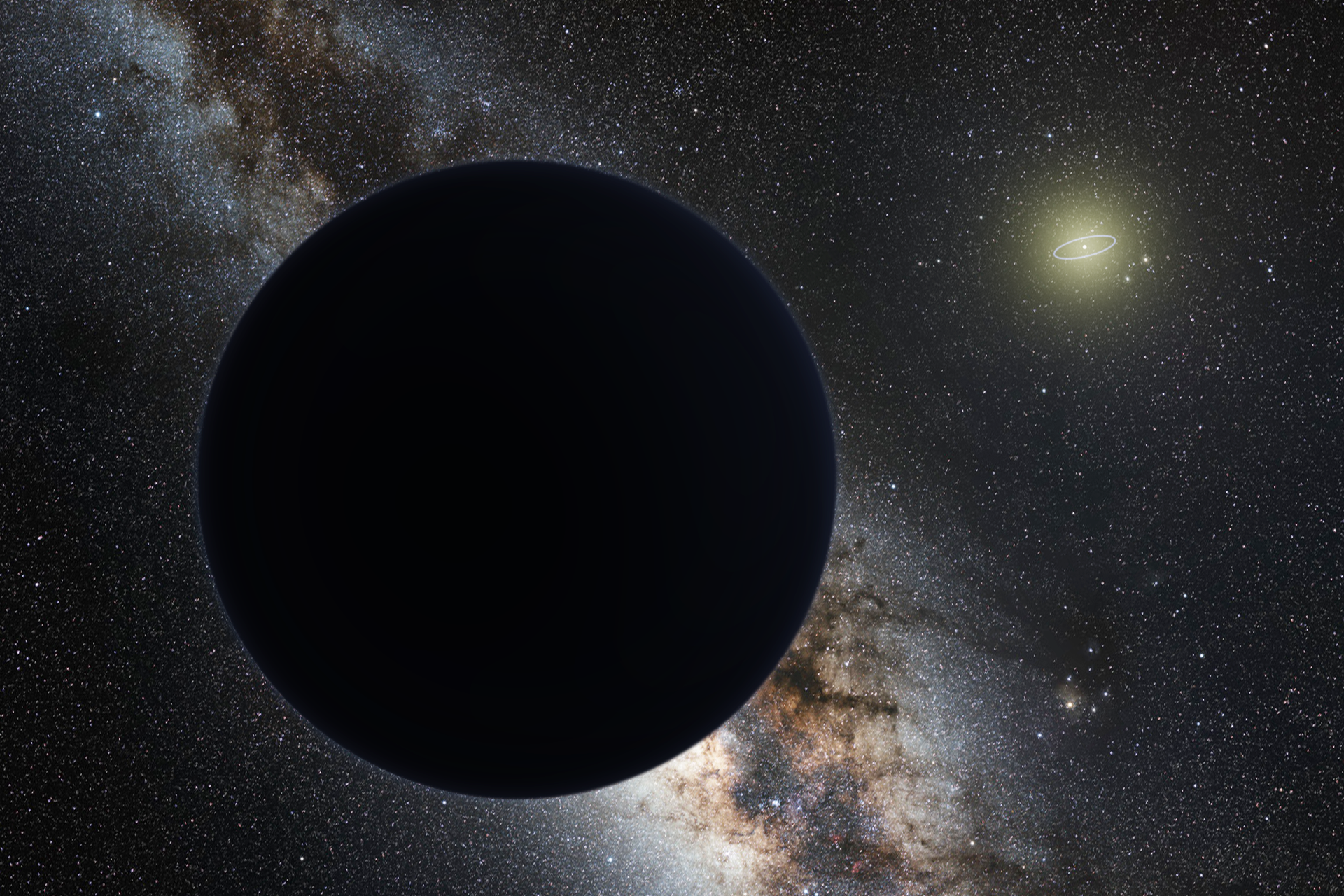
- Artist's impression of Planet Nine eclipsing the central Milky Way, with the Sun in the distance; Neptune's orbit is shown as a small ellipse around the Sun (See labelled version)

Orbital characteristics
- Aphelion: 370±30 AU
- Perihelion: 200±50 AU
- Semi-major axis: 290±30 AU
- Eccentricity: 0.29±0.13
- Orbital period (sidereal): 4,940+790 −750 yr (Note: As of 2024 the semi-major axis of Planet Nine is estimated by Siraj, Chyba and Tremaine to be 290 AU, with a margin or error of ±30 allowing for a range between 260 and 320 AU; this implies that the planet has an orbital period of 4,190 (260^{1.5}) to 5,720 (320^{1.5}) years.)
- Inclination: 6.8°±5.0°
- Argument of perihelion: 150° (est.)

Physical characteristics
- Mass: 4.4±1.1 M_{🜨}
- Apparent magnitude: ≈21

Planet Nine is a hypothetical ninth planet in the outer region of the Solar System. Its gravitational effects could explain the peculiar clustering of orbits for a group of extreme trans-Neptunian objects (ETNOs)—bodies beyond Neptune that orbit the Sun at distances averaging more than 250 astronomical units (AU). These ETNOs tend to make their closest approaches to the Sun in one sector, and their orbits are similarly tilted. These alignments suggest that an undiscovered planet may be shepherding the orbits of the most distant known Solar System objects. Nonetheless, some astronomers question this conclusion and instead assert that the clustering of the ETNOs' orbits is due to observational biases stemming from the difficulty of discovering and tracking these objects during much of the year.

Based on earlier considerations, this hypothetical super-Earth-to-mini-Neptune sized planet would have had a predicted mass of five to ten times that of the Earth, and an elongated orbit 400–800 AU. The orbit estimation was refined in 2021, resulting in a somewhat smaller semimajor axis of 380^{+140}_{−80} AU. This was shortly thereafter updated to 460 ^{+160}_{−100} AU, and to 290±30 AU in 2025. Astronomers Konstantin Batygin and Michael Brown have suggested that Planet Nine may be the core of a giant planet that was ejected from its original orbit by Jupiter during the genesis of the Solar System. Others suggest that the planet was captured from another star, was once a rogue planet, or that it formed on a distant orbit and was pulled into an eccentric orbit by a passing star.

Although sky surveys such as Wide-field Infrared Survey Explorer (WISE) and Pan-STARRS did not detect Planet Nine, they have not ruled out the existence of a Neptune-diameter object in the outer Solar System. The ability of these past sky surveys to detect Planet Nine was dependent on its location and characteristics. Further surveys of the remaining regions were conducted using NEOWISE and are ongoing using the 8-meter Subaru Telescope. Unless Planet Nine is observed, its existence remains purely conjectural. Several alternative hypotheses have been proposed to explain the observed clustered distribution of trans-Neptunian objects (TNOs).

Subsequent discoveries of objects including 2017 OF201 and 2023 KQ14 have challenged the hypothesis, as their orbits are not aligned with the other TNOs and would be unstable if Planet Nine were present.

== History ==
Following the discovery of Neptune in 1846, there was considerable speculation that another planet might exist beyond its orbit. The best-known of these theories predicted the existence of a distant planet that was influencing the orbits of Uranus and Neptune. After extensive calculations, Percival Lowell predicted the possible orbit and location of the hypothetical trans-Neptunian planet and began an extensive search for it in 1906. He called the hypothetical object Planet X, a name previously used by Gabriel Dallet. Clyde Tombaugh continued Lowell's search and in 1930 discovered Pluto, but it was soon determined to be too small to qualify as Lowell's Planet X. After Voyager 2's flyby of Neptune in 1989, the difference between Uranus' predicted and observed orbit was determined to have been due to the use of a previously inaccurate mass of Neptune.

Attempts to detect planets beyond Neptune by indirect means such as orbital perturbation date to before the discovery of Pluto. Among the first was George Forbes who postulated the existence of two trans-Neptunian planets in 1880. One would have an average distance from the Sun, or semi-major axis, of 100 AU, 100 times that of the Earth. The second would have a semi-major axis of 300 AU. Forbes' work is considered similar to more recent Planet Nine theories in that the planets would be responsible for a clustering of the orbits of several objects, in this case the clustering of aphelion distances of periodic comets near about 100–300 AU. This is similar to how the aphelion distances of Jupiter-family comets cluster near its orbit.

The discovery of Sedna, a dwarf planet with a highly peculiar orbit in 2003, led to speculation that it had encountered a massive body other than one of the known planets. Sedna's orbit is detached, with a perihelion distance of 76 AU that is too large to be due to gravitational interactions with Neptune. Several authors have proposed that Sedna entered this orbit after encountering a massive body such as an unknown planet on a distant orbit, a member of the open cluster that formed with the Sun, or another star that later passed near the Solar System. The announcement in March 2014 of the discovery of 2012 VP113, a second sednoid in a similar orbit but with a perihelion distance of 80 AU led to renewed speculation that an unknown super-Earth yet remains in the distant Solar System.

At a conference in 2012, Rodney Gomes proposed that an undetected planet was responsible for the orbits of some ETNOs with detached orbits and the large semi-major axis Centaurs, small Solar System bodies that cross the orbits of the giant planets. The proposed Neptune-massed planet would be in a distant (a ≈ 1500 AU), eccentric (e ≈ 0.4), and steeply inclined (i ≈ 40°) orbit. Like Planet Nine it would cause the perihelia of objects with semi-major axes greater than 300 AU to oscillate, delivering some into planet-crossing orbits and others into detached orbits like that of Sedna. The joint work with Soares and Brasser was published in 2015.

In 2014, astronomers Chad Trujillo and Scott S. Sheppard noted the similarities in the orbits of Sedna and 2012 VP_{113} and several other ETNOs. They proposed that an unknown planet in a circular orbit between 200 and 300 AU was perturbing their orbits. Later that year, Raúl and Carlos de la Fuente Marcos argued that two massive planets in orbital resonance were necessary to produce the similarities of so many orbits, 13 known at the time. Using a larger sample of 39 ETNOs, they estimated that the nearer planet had a semi-major axis in the range of 300–400 AU, a relatively low eccentricity, and an inclination of nearly 14°.

== Batygin and Brown hypothesis ==
Brown had led a team which discovered and identified many TNOs throughout the 2000s. They were the first to catalog many of the objects which would later be used as evidence for Planet Nine.

In early 2016, California Institute of Technology's Batygin and Brown described how the similar orbits of six ETNOs could be explained by Planet Nine and proposed a possible orbit for the planet. This hypothesis could also explain ETNOs with orbits perpendicular to the inner planets and others with extreme inclinations, and had been offered as an explanation of the tilt of the Sun's axis.

=== Orbit ===
Planet Nine was initially hypothesized to follow an elliptical orbit around the Sun with an eccentricity of 0.2–0.5, and its semi-major axis was estimated to be 400–800 AU, (Note: A range of semi-major axes extending from 400–1000 AU produce the observed clustering in simulations.) roughly 13–26 times the distance from Neptune to the Sun. It would take the planet between 10000 – 20000 years to make one full orbit around the Sun, and its inclination to the ecliptic, the plane of the Earth's orbit, was projected to be 15° to 25°. (Note: The New Yorker put the average orbital distance of Planet Nine into perspective with an apparent allusion to one of the magazine's most famous cartoons, View of the World from 9th Avenue: "If the Sun were on Fifth Avenue and Earth were one block west, Jupiter would be on the West Side Highway, Pluto would be in Montclair, New Jersey, and the new planet would be somewhere near Cleveland.") The aphelion, or farthest point from the Sun, would be in the general direction of the constellation of Taurus, whereas the perihelion, the nearest point to the Sun, would be in the general direction of the southerly areas of Serpens (Caput), Ophiuchus, and Libra. Brown thinks that if Planet Nine exists, a probe could reach it in as little as 20 years by using a powered slingshot trajectory around the Sun.

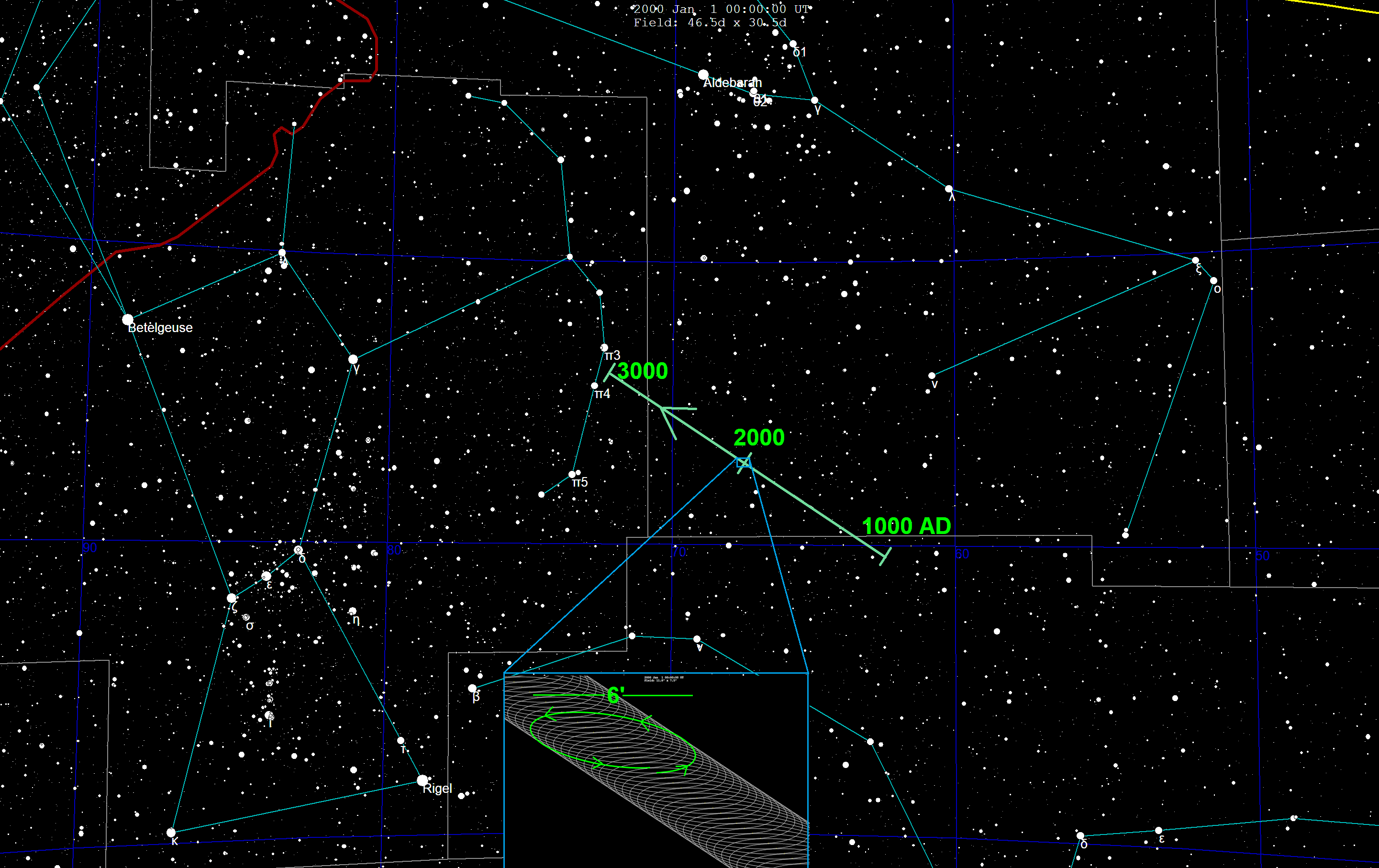
One hypothetical path through the sky of Planet Nine near aphelion crossing Orion west to east with about 2000 years of motion. It is derived from that employed in the artistic conception on Brown's blog.

=== Mass and radius ===
Planet Nine is estimated to have 5–10 times the mass and 2–4 times the radius of the Earth. Brown thinks that if Planet Nine exists, its mass is sufficient to clear its orbit of large bodies in 4.5 billion years, the age of the Solar System, and that its gravity dominates the outer edge of the Solar System, which is sufficient to make it a planet by current definitions. Astronomer Jean-Luc Margot has also stated that Planet Nine satisfies his criteria and would qualify as a planet if and when it is detected.

Later simulations by Amir Siraj and colleagues in 2025 have refined estimates of the planet's mass to 4.4 ± 1.1 times that of Earth.

==== Internal composition ====
Given a hypothesized ~10 Earth masses and using a theory of exoplanet sizes in the Kepler-454 system, Esther Linder and Christoph Mordasini assumed that Planet Nine's radius would be 3.66 times that of Earth's (23,300 km versus 6,378 km), and that its internal composition would be similar to Uranus and Neptune's: Planet Nine would likely have a hydrogen-helium atmosphere averaging 47 kelvins, with a core composed of iron and a mantle filled with magnesium silicate and water ice.

However, Siraj et al. (2025) suggest that Planet Nine's mass and orbital characteristics would render its composition closer to that of a rocky planet like Earth.

=== Origin ===
Several possible origins for Planet Nine have been examined, including its ejection from the neighborhood of the known giant planets, capture from another star, and in situ formation. In their initial article, Batygin and Brown proposed that Planet Nine formed closer to the Sun and was ejected into a distant eccentric orbit following a close encounter with Jupiter or Saturn during the nebular epoch. Then, either the gravity of a nearby star or drag from the gaseous remnants of the solar nebula reduced the eccentricity of its orbit. This process raised its perihelion, leaving it in a very wide but stable orbit beyond the influence of the other planets.

The odds of this occurring has been estimated at a few percent. If it had not been flung into the Solar System's farthest reaches, Planet Nine could have accreted more mass from the proto-planetary disk and developed into the core of a gas giant or ice giant. Instead, its growth was halted early, leaving it with a lower mass than Uranus or Neptune.

Dynamical friction from a massive belt of planetesimals also could have enabled Planet Nine's capture into a stable orbit. Recent models propose that a 60–130 M_{🜨} disk of planetesimals could have formed as the gas was cleared from the outer parts of the proto-planetary disk. As Planet Nine passed through this disk its gravity would alter the paths of the individual objects in a way that reduced Planet Nine's velocity relative to it. This would lower the eccentricity of Planet Nine and stabilize its orbit. If this disk had a distant inner edge, 100–200 AU, a planet encountering Neptune would have a 20% chance of being captured in an orbit similar to that proposed for Planet Nine, with the observed clustering more likely if the inner edge is at 200 AU. Unlike the gas nebula, the planetesimal disk is likely to have been long lived, potentially allowing a later capture.

An encounter with another star could also alter the orbit of a distant planet, shifting it from a circular to an eccentric orbit. The in situ formation of a planet at this distance would require a very massive and extensive disk, or the outward drift of solids in a dissipating disk forming a narrow ring from which the planet accreted over a billion years. If a planet formed at such a great distance while the Sun was in its original cluster, the probability of it remaining bound to the Sun in a highly eccentric orbit is roughly 10%. However, while the Sun remained in the open cluster where it formed, any extended disk would have been subject to gravitational disruption by passing stars and by mass loss due to photoevaporation.

Planet Nine could have been captured from outside the Solar System during a close encounter between the Sun and another star. If a planet was in a distant orbit around this star, three-body interactions during the encounter could alter the planet's path, leaving it in a stable orbit around the Sun. A planet originating in a system without Jupiter-massed planets could remain in a distant eccentric orbit for a longer time, increasing its chances of capture. The wider range of possible orbits would reduce the odds of its capture in a relatively low inclination orbit to 1–2%. Amir Siraj and Avi Loeb found that the odds of the Sun capturing Planet Nine increases by 20× if the Sun once had a distant, equal-mass binary companion. This process could also occur with rogue planets, but the likelihood of their capture is much smaller, with only 0.05–0.10% being captured in orbits similar to that proposed for Planet Nine.

=== Evidence ===
The gravitational influence of Planet Nine would explain four peculiarities of the Solar System:

- the clustering of the orbits of ETNOs;
- the high perihelia of objects like Sedna that are detached from Neptune's influence;
- the high inclinations of ETNOs with orbits roughly perpendicular to the orbits of the eight known planets;
- high-inclination trans-Neptunian objects (TNOs) with semi-major axis less than 100 AU.

Planet Nine was initially proposed to explain the clustering of orbits, via a mechanism that would also explain the high perihelia of objects like Sedna. The evolution of some of these objects into perpendicular orbits was unexpected, but found to match objects previously observed. The orbits of some objects with perpendicular orbits were later found to evolve toward smaller semi-major axes when the other planets were included in simulations. Although other mechanisms have been offered for many of these peculiarities, the gravitational influence of Planet Nine is the only one that explains all four. The gravity of Planet Nine would also increase the inclinations of other objects that cross its orbit, however, which could leave the scattered disk objects, bodies orbiting beyond Neptune with semi-major axes greater than 50 AU, and short-period comets with a broader inclination distribution than is observed. Previously Planet Nine was hypothesized to be responsible for the 6° tilt of the Sun's axis relative to the orbits of the planets, but recent updates to its predicted orbit and mass limit this shift to ≈1°.

==== Observations ====
Diagram illustrating the true anomaly, argument of periapsis, longitude of ascending node, and inclination of a celestial body.

The clustering of the orbits of TNOs with large semi-major axes was first described by Trujillo and Sheppard, who noted similarities between the orbits of Sedna and 2012 VP_{113}. Without the presence of Planet Nine, these orbits should be distributed randomly, without preference for any direction. Upon further analysis, Trujillo and Sheppard observed that the arguments of perihelion of 12 TNOs with perihelia greater than 30 AU and semi-major axes greater than 150 AU were clustered near 0°, meaning that they rise through the ecliptic when they are closest to the Sun. Trujillo and Sheppard proposed that this alignment was caused by a massive unknown planet beyond Neptune via the Kozai mechanism. For objects with similar semi-major axes the Kozai mechanism would confine their arguments of perihelion near to either 0° or 180°. This confinement allows objects with eccentric and inclined orbits to avoid close approaches to the planet because they would cross the plane of the planet's orbit at their closest and farthest points from the Sun, and cross the planet's orbit when they are well above or below its orbit. Trujillo and Sheppard's hypothesis about how the objects would be aligned by the Kozai mechanism has been supported by further analysis and evidence.

Batygin and Brown, looking to refute the mechanism proposed by Trujillo and Sheppard, also examined the orbits of the TNOs with large semi-major axes. After eliminating the objects in Trujillo and Sheppard's original analysis that were unstable due to close approaches to Neptune or were affected by Neptune's mean-motion resonances, Batygin and Brown determined that the arguments of perihelion for the remaining six objects (Sedna, 2012 VP_{113}, 474640 Alicanto, 2010 GB174, 2000 CR_{105}, and 2010 VZ_{98}) were clustered around 318°±8°. This finding did not agree with how the Kozai mechanism would tend to align orbits with arguments of perihelion at 0° or 180°. (Note: Two types of protection mechanisms are possible: 1. For bodies whose values of a and e are such that they could encounter the planets only near perihelion (or aphelion), such encounters may be prevented by the high inclination and the libration of ω about 90° or 270° (even when the encounters occur, they do not affect much the minor planet's orbit due to comparatively high relative velocities).; 2. Another mechanism is viable when at low inclinations when ω oscillates around 0° or 180° and the minor planet's semi-major axis is close to that of the perturbing planet: In this case the °node crossing occurs always near perihelion and aphelion, far from the planet itself, provided the eccentricity is high enough and the orbit of the planet is almost circular.)

Orbital correlations among six distant trans-Neptunian objects led to the hypothesis. (See: Final frame orbits.)

Batygin and Brown also found that the orbits of the six ETNOs with semi-major axis greater than 250 AU and perihelia beyond 30 AU (Sedna, 2012 VP_{113}, Alicanto, 2010 GB_{174}, 2007 TG422, and 2013 RF98) were aligned in space with their perihelia in roughly the same direction, resulting in a clustering of their longitudes of perihelion, the location where they make their closest approaches to the Sun. The orbits of the six objects were also tilted with respect to that of the ecliptic and approximately coplanar, producing a clustering of their longitudes of ascending nodes, the directions where they each rise through the ecliptic. They determined that there was only a 0.007% likelihood that this combination of alignments was due to chance. These six objects had been discovered by six different surveys on six telescopes. That made it less likely that the clumping might be due to an observation bias such as pointing a telescope at a particular part of the sky. The observed clustering should be smeared out in a few hundred million years due to the locations of the perihelia and the ascending nodes changing, or precessing, at differing rates due to their varied semi-major axes and eccentricities. (Note: The precession rate is slower for objects with larger semi-major axes and inclinations and with smaller eccentricities: $\dot{\varpi}=\frac{3}{4} \sqrt{\frac{GM}{a^3}} \frac{1}{(1-e^2)^2}\sum_{k=5}^8 \frac{m_k a_k^2}{M a^2}cos^2(i)$ where $m_k a_k$ are the masses and semi-major axes of the planets Jupiter through Neptune.) This indicates that the clustering could not be due to an event in the distant past, for example a passing star, and is most likely maintained by the gravitational field of an object orbiting the Sun.

Two of the six objects (2013 RF_{98} and Alicanto) also have very similar orbits and spectra. This has led to the suggestion that they were a binary object disrupted near aphelion during an encounter with a distant object. The disruption of a binary would require a relatively close encounter, which becomes less likely at large distances from the Sun.

In a later article Trujillo and Sheppard noted a correlation between the longitude of perihelion and the argument of perihelion of the TNOs with semi-major axes greater than 150 AU. Those with a longitude of perihelion of 0–120° have arguments of perihelion between 280 and 360°, and those with longitude of perihelion between 180° and 340° have arguments of perihelion between 0° and 40°. The statistical significance of this correlation was 99.99%. They suggested that the correlation is due to the orbits of these objects avoiding close approaches to a massive planet by passing above or below its orbit.

A 2017 article by Carlos and Raúl de la Fuente Marcos noted that distribution of the distances to the ascending nodes of the ETNOs, and those of centaurs and comets with large semi-major axes, may be bimodal. They suggest it is due to the ETNOs avoiding close approaches to a planet with a semi-major axis of 300–400 AU. With more data (40 objects), the distribution of mutual nodal distances of the ETNOs shows a statistically significant asymmetry between the shortest mutual ascending and descending nodal distances that may not be due to observational bias but likely the result of external perturbations. In 2025, astronomers reported a Sedna-like trans-Neptunian object, 2023 KQ_{14} ('Ammonite'), its longitude of perihelion lies opposite that of previously known sednoids, filling a perihelion gap and remaining stable over 4.5 Gyr in simulations. These findings show that, if a distant planet exists, it favors a more remote (~500 AU) orbit than closer configurations.

The extreme trans-Neptunian object orbits

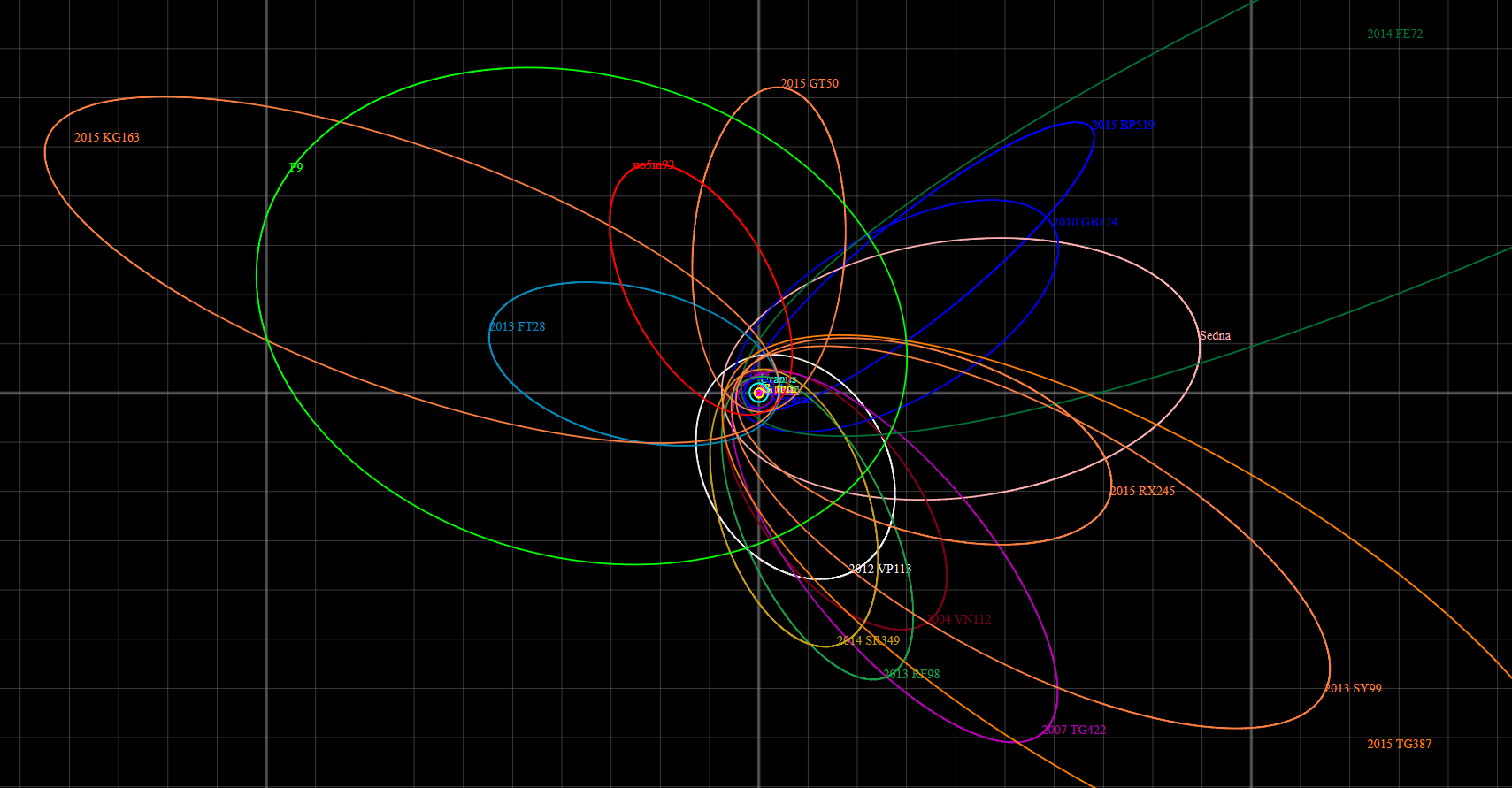
Six original and eight additional ETNO objects orbits with current positions near their perihelion in purple, with hypothetical Planet Nine orbit in green

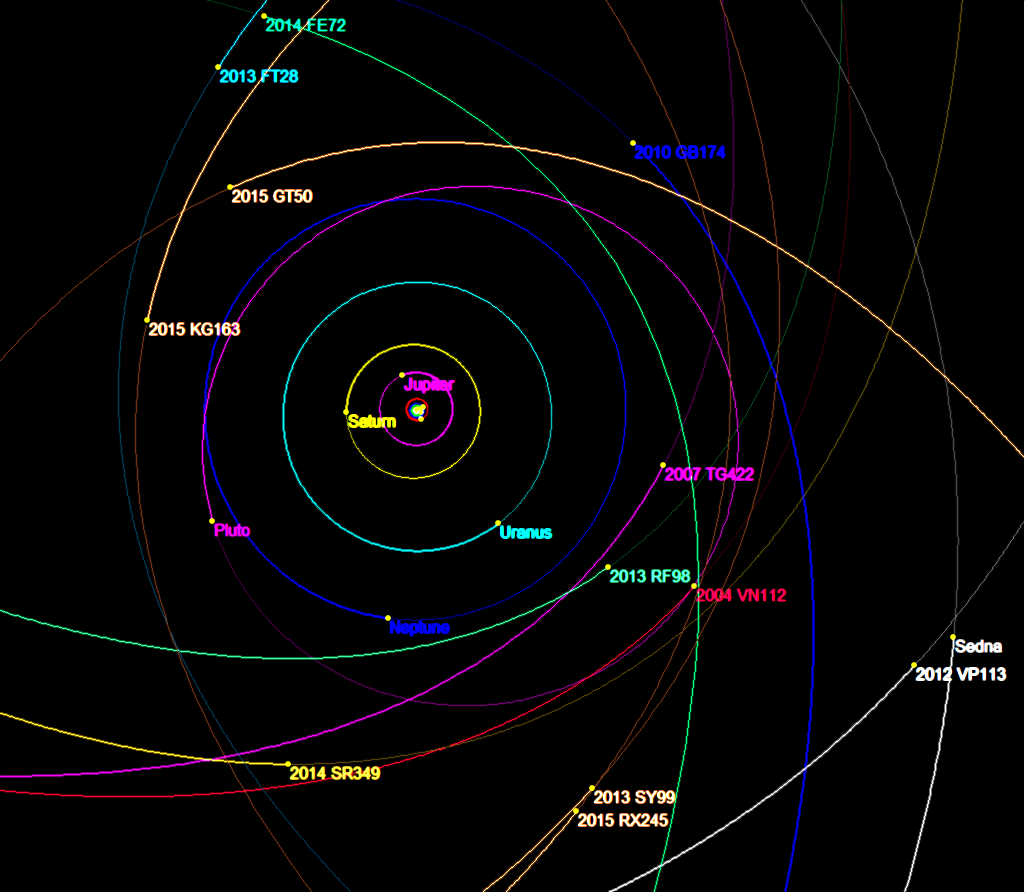
Close up view of 13 ETNO current positions

==== Simulations ====
The clustering of the orbits of ETNOs and raising of their perihelia is reproduced in simulations that include Planet Nine. In simulations conducted by Batygin and Brown, swarms of scattered disk objects with semi-major axes up to 550 AU that began with random orientations were sculpted into roughly collinear and coplanar groups of spatially confined orbits by a massive distant planet in a highly eccentric orbit. This left most of the objects' perihelia pointed in similar directions and the objects' orbits with similar tilts. Many of these objects entered high-perihelion orbits like Sedna and, unexpectedly, some entered perpendicular orbits that Batygin and Brown later noticed had been previously observed.

In their original analysis Batygin and Brown found that the distribution of the orbits of the first six ETNOs was best reproduced in simulations using a 10 M_{🜨} (Note: Batygin and Brown provide an order of magnitude estimate for the mass.: If M_{9} were equal to 0.1 M_{🜨}, then the dynamical evolution would proceed at an exceptionally slow rate, and the lifetime of the Solar System would likely be insufficient for the required orbital sculpting to transpire.; If M_{9} were equal to 1 M_{🜨}, then long-lived apsidally anti-aligned orbits would indeed occur, but removal of unstable orbits would happen on a much longer timescale than the current evolution of the Solar System. Hence, even though they would show preference for a particular apsidal direction, they would not exhibit true confinement like the data.; They also note that M_{9} greater than 10 M_{🜨} would imply a longer semi-major axis.; Hence they estimate that the mass of the object is likely in the range of 5–15 M_{🜨}.) planet in the following orbit: (Note: calculated values in parentheses.)

- semi-major axis a ≈ 700 AU (orbital period 700^{1.5} = 18520 years)
- eccentricity e ≈ 0.6, (perihelion ≈ 280 AU, aphelion ≈ 1120 AU)
- inclination i ≈ 30° to the ecliptic
- longitude of the ascending node Ω ≈ 100°. (Note: The average of longitude of the ascending node for the six objects is about 102°. In a blog published later, Batygin and Brown constrained their estimate of the longitude of the ascending node to 94°.)
- argument of perihelion ω ≈ 140° and longitude of perihelion ϖ ≡ ω + Ω ≈ 240°

These parameters for Planet Nine produce different simulated effects on TNOs. Objects with semi-major axis greater than 250 AU are strongly anti-aligned with Planet Nine, with perihelia opposite Planet Nine's perihelion. Objects with semi-major axes between 150 and 250 AU are weakly aligned with Planet Nine, with perihelia in the same direction as Planet Nine's perihelion. Little effect is found on objects with semi-major axes less than 150 AU. The simulations also revealed that objects with semi-major axes greater than 250 AU could have stable, aligned orbits if they had lower eccentricities. These objects have yet to be observed.

Other possible orbits for Planet Nine were also examined, with semi-major axes between 400 AU and 1500 AU, eccentricities up to 0.8, and a wide range of inclinations. These orbits yield varied results. Batygin and Brown found that orbits of the ETNOs were more likely to have similar tilts if Planet Nine had a higher inclination, but anti-alignment also decreased. Simulations by Becker et al. showed that their orbits were more stable if Planet Nine had a smaller eccentricity, but that anti-alignment was more likely at higher eccentricities. Lawler et al. found that the population captured in orbital resonances with Planet Nine was smaller if it had a circular orbit, and that fewer objects reached high inclination orbits. Investigations by Cáceres et al. showed that the orbits of the ETNOs were better aligned if Planet Nine had a lower perihelion orbit, but its perihelion would need to be higher than 90 AU. Later investigations by Batygin et al. found that higher eccentricity orbits reduced the average tilts of the ETNOs' orbits. While there are many possible combinations of orbital parameters and masses for Planet Nine, none of the alternative simulations were better at predicting the observed alignment of the original ETNOs. The discovery of additional distant Solar System objects would allow astronomers to make more accurate predictions about the orbit of the hypothesized planet. These may also provide further support for, or refutation of, the Planet Nine hypothesis.

Simulations that included the migration of giant planets resulted in a weaker alignment of the ETNOs' orbits. The direction of alignment also switched, from more aligned to anti-aligned with increasing semi-major axis, and from anti-aligned to aligned with increasing perihelion distance. The latter would result in the sednoids' orbits being oriented opposite most of the other ETNOs.

==== Interactions of Planet Nine with ETNOs ====
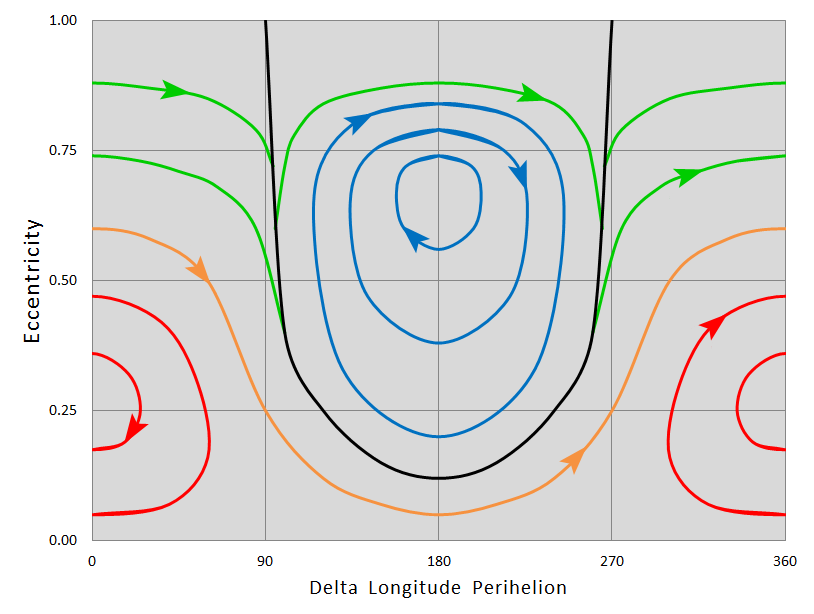
Long term evolution of ETNOs induced by Planet Nine for objects with semi-major axis of 250 AU. Blue: anti-aligned, Red: aligned, Green: metastable, Orange: circulating. Crossing orbits above black line. (Note: Similar figures in articles by Beust and Batygin and Morbidelli are plots of the Hamiltonian, showing combinations of orbital eccentricities and orientations that have equal energy. If there are no close encounters with Planet Nine, which would change the energy of the orbit, the object's orbital elements remain on one of these curves as the orbits evolve.)

Planet Nine modifies the orbits of ETNOs via a combination of effects. On very long timescales Planet Nine exerts a torque on the orbits of the ETNOs that varies with the alignment of their orbits with Planet Nine's. The resulting exchanges of angular momentum cause the perihelia to rise, placing them in Sedna-like orbits, and later fall, returning them to their original orbits after several hundred million years. The motion of their directions of perihelion also reverses when their eccentricities are small, keeping the objects anti-aligned, see blue curves on diagram, or aligned, red curves. On shorter timescales mean-motion resonances with Planet Nine provides phase protection, which stabilizes their orbits by slightly altering the objects' semi-major axes, keeping their orbits synchronized with Planet Nine's and preventing close approaches. The gravity of Neptune and the other giant planets, and the inclination of Planet Nine's orbit, weaken this protection. This results in a chaotic variation of semi-major axes as objects hop between resonances, including high-order resonances such as 27:17, on million-year timescales. The mean-motion resonances may not be necessary for the survival of ETNOs if they and Planet Nine are both on inclined orbits. The orbital poles of the objects precess around, or circle, the pole of the Solar System's Laplace plane. At large semi-major axes the Laplace plane is warped toward the plane of Planet Nine's orbit. This causes orbital poles of the ETNOs on average to be tilted toward one side and their longitudes of ascending nodes to be clustered.

In 2024, Brown and Batygin completed a simulation which showed that the presence of Planet Nine, over time, would increase the eccentricities of a significant subset of objects with semi-major axes above 100 AU until their perihelion reduced under 30 AU, which would mean that their orbits cross that of Neptune. They also conducted a survey of Neptune-crossing objects with inclinations below 40 degrees and semi-major axes between 100 and 1000 AU and argued that the results aligned with the presence of Planet Nine, which would produce a ratio of Neptune-crossers to objects with a perihelion beyond Neptune's orbit of 3%, compared to 0.5% in the absence of Planet Nine.

==== Objects in perpendicular orbits with large semi-major axis ====
The orbits of five of the objects with high-inclination orbits (nearly perpendicular to the ecliptic) are shown here as cyan ellipses with the hypothetical Planet Nine in orange.

Planet Nine can deliver ETNOs into orbits roughly perpendicular to the ecliptic. Several objects with high inclinations, greater than 50°, and large semi-major axes, above 250 AU, have been observed. These orbits are produced when some low inclination ETNOs enter a secular resonance with Planet Nine upon reaching low eccentricity orbits. The resonance causes their eccentricities and inclinations to increase, delivering the ETNOs into perpendicular orbits with low perihelia where they are more readily observed. The ETNOs then evolve into retrograde orbits with lower eccentricities, after which they pass through a second phase of high eccentricity perpendicular orbits, before returning to low eccentricity and inclination orbits. The secular resonance with Planet Nine involves a linear combination of the orbit's arguments and longitudes of perihelion: Δϖ – 2ω . Unlike the Kozai mechanism this resonance causes objects to reach their maximum eccentricities when in nearly perpendicular orbits. In simulations conducted by Batygin and Morbidelli this evolution was relatively common, with 38% of stable objects undergoing it at least once. The arguments of perihelion of these objects are clustered near or opposite Planet Nine's and their longitudes of ascending node are clustered around 90° in either direction from Planet Nine's when they reach low perihelia. This is in rough agreement with observations with the differences attributed to distant encounters with the known giant planets.

==== Orbits of high-inclination objects ====
A population of high-inclination TNOs with semi-major axes less than 100 AU may be generated by the combined effects of Planet Nine and the other giant planets. The ETNOs that enter perpendicular orbits have perihelia low enough for their orbits to intersect those of Neptune or the other giant planets. An encounter with one of these planets can lower an ETNO's semi-major axis to below 100 AU, where the object's orbits is no longer controlled by Planet Nine, leaving it in an orbit like 2008 KV42. The predicted orbital distribution of the longest lived of these objects is nonuniform. Most would have orbits with perihelia ranging from 5 AU to 35 AU and inclinations below 110°; beyond a gap with few objects are would be others with inclinations near 150° and perihelia near 10 AU. Previously it was proposed that these objects originated in the Oort cloud, a theoretical cloud of icy planetesimals surrounding the Sun at distances of 2,000 to 200,000 AU. In simulations without Planet Nine an insufficient number are produced from the Oort cloud relative to observations, however. A few of the high-inclination TNOs may become retrograde Jupiter Trojans.

==== Oort cloud and comets ====
Planet Nine would alter the source regions and the inclination distribution of comets. In simulations of the migration of the giant planets described by the Nice model fewer objects are captured in the Oort cloud when Planet Nine is included. Other objects would be captured in a cloud of objects dynamically controlled by Planet Nine. This Planet Nine cloud, made up of the ETNOs and the perpendicular objects, would extend from semi-major axes of 200–3000 AU and contain roughly 0.3–0.4 M_{🜨}. When the perihelia of objects in the Planet Nine cloud drop low enough for them to encounter the other planets some would be scattered into orbits that enter the inner Solar System where they could be observed as comets. If Planet Nine exists these would make up roughly one third of the Halley-type comets. Interactions with Planet Nine would also increase the inclinations of the scattered disk objects that cross its orbit. This could result in more with moderate inclinations of 15–30° than are observed. The inclinations of the Jupiter-family comets derived from that population would also have a broader inclination distribution than is observed. Recent estimates of a smaller mass and eccentricity for Planet Nine would reduce its effect on these inclinations.

==== 2019 estimate ====
In February 2019, the total of ETNOs that fit the original hypothesis of having semi-major axis of over 250 AU had increased to fourteen objects. The orbit parameters for Planet Nine favored by Batygin and Brown after an analysis using these objects were:

- semi-major axis of 400–500 AU;
- orbital eccentricity of 0.15–0.3;
- orbital inclination around 20°;
- mass of about 5 M_{🜨}.

==== 2021 estimate ====
In August 2021, Batygin and Brown reanalyzed the data related to ETNO observations while accounting for observational biases, they found that observations were more likely in some directions than others. They stated that the orbital clustering observed "remains significant at a 99.6% confidence level". Combining observational biases with numerical simulations, they predicted the characteristics of Planet Nine:

- semi-major axis of 380^{+140}_{−80} AU (300–520 AU);
- perihelion of 300^{+85}_{−60} AU (240–385 AU);
- orbital inclination of 16±5° (11°–21°);
- mass of 6.2^{+2.2}_{−1.3} Earth masses (M_{9} ≈ 4.9–8.4 M_{⊕}).

=== Reception ===
Batygin was cautious in interpreting the results of the simulation developed for his and Brown's research article, saying, "Until Planet Nine is caught on camera it does not count as being real. All we have now is an echo." In 2016, Brown put the odds for the existence of Planet Nine at about 90%. Greg Laughlin, one of the few researchers who knew in advance about this article, gives an estimate of 68.3%. Other skeptical scientists demand more data in terms of additional KBOs to be analyzed or final evidence through photographic confirmation. Brown, though conceding the skeptics' point, still thinks that there is enough data to mount a search for a new planet.

The Planet Nine hypothesis is supported by several astronomers and academics. In January 2016 Jim Green, director of NASA's Science Mission Directorate, said, "the evidence is stronger now than it's been before". But Green also cautioned about the possibility of other explanations for the observed motion of distant ETNOs and, quoting Carl Sagan, he said, "extraordinary claims require extraordinary evidence." Massachusetts Institute of Technology Professor Tom Levenson concluded that, for now, Planet Nine seems the only satisfactory explanation for everything now known about the outer regions of the Solar System. Astronomer Alessandro Morbidelli, who reviewed the research article for The Astronomical Journal, concurred, saying, "I don't see any alternative explanation to that offered by Batygin and Brown."

Astronomer Renu Malhotra remains agnostic about Planet Nine, but noted that she and her colleagues have found that the orbits of ETNOs seem tilted in a way that is difficult to otherwise explain. "The amount of warp we see is just crazy," she said. "To me, it's the most intriguing evidence for Planet Nine I've run across so far."

Other experts have varying degrees of skepticism. American astrophysicist Ethan Siegel, who previously speculated that planets may have been ejected from the Solar System during an early dynamical instability, is skeptical of the existence of an undiscovered planet in the Solar System. In a 2018 article discussing a survey that did not find evidence of clustering of the ETNOs' orbits, he suggests the previously observed clustering could have been the result of observational bias and claims most scientists think Planet Nine does not exist. Planetary scientist Hal Levison thinks that the chance of an ejected object ending up in the inner Oort cloud is about 2%, and speculates that many objects must have been thrown past the Oort cloud if one has entered a stable orbit.

Further skepticism about the Planet Nine hypothesis arose in 2020, based on results from the Outer Solar System Origins Survey and the Dark Energy Survey, with the OSSOS documenting over 800 trans-Neptunian objects and the DES discovering 316 new ones. Both surveys adjusted for observational bias and concluded that of the objects observed there was no evidence for clustering. The authors go further to explain that practically all objects' orbits can be explained by physical phenomena rather than a ninth planet as proposed by Brown and Batygin. An author of one of the studies, Samantha Lawler, said the hypothesis of Planet Nine proposed by Brown and Batygin "does not hold up to detailed observations" pointing out the much larger sample size of 800 objects compared to the much smaller 14 and that conclusive studies based on said objects were "premature". She went further to explain the phenomenon of these extreme orbits could be due to gravitational occultation from Neptune when it migrated outwards earlier in the Solar System's history.

== Alternative hypotheses ==
=== Missing planet from Nice model ===
Planet Nine has been proposed as a potential remnant of the early Solar System's evolution. According to the Five-planet Nice model, the early Solar System contained five giant planets: Jupiter, Saturn, Uranus, Neptune, and a fifth, now-missing ice giant. Simulations of the Nice model suggest that gravitational interactions among these planets, coupled with interactions with a disk of planetesimals, led to the ejection of the fifth giant from the Solar System approximately 4 billion years ago. Some researchers propose that Planet Nine could be this fifth giant, lingering in a distant, eccentric orbit far beyond Neptune instead of being entirely ejected from the Solar System. This hypothesis aligns with observations suggesting Planet Nine's orbit would be stable over the Solar System's lifetime, supporting its survival as an outer-system object.

The hypothesis that Planet Nine may be the fifth giant is bolstered by its proposed mass and orbital characteristics, which are consistent with those of an ice giant. Numerical simulations of the Nice model show that the ejection of the fifth giant often leaves a gravitational signature in the form of altered orbits for the remaining planets and small bodies. The observed clustering of certain trans-Neptunian objects (TNOs) has been cited as indirect evidence of Planet Nine's gravitational influence, possibly originating from its early interactions with the outer Solar System.

=== Temporary or coincidental clustering ===
The results of the Outer Solar System Survey (OSSOS) suggest that the observed clustering is the result of a combination of observational bias and small number statistics. OSSOS, a well-characterized survey of the outer Solar System with known biases, observed eight objects with semi-major axis a > 150 AU with orbits oriented in a wide range of directions. After accounting for the observational biases of the survey, no evidence for the arguments of perihelion (ω) clustering identified by Trujillo and Sheppard was seen, (Note: Of the eight objects with a semi-major axis a > 150 AU, OSSOS found three with arguments of perihelion (ω) outside the cluster previously identified by Trujillo and Sheppard (2014): 2015 GT50, 2015 KH163, and 2013 UT15.) and the orientation of the orbits of the objects with the largest semi-major axis was statistically consistent with being random. Pedro Bernardinelli and his colleagues also found that the orbital elements of the ETNOs found by the Dark Energy Survey showed no evidence of clustering. However, they also noted that the sky coverage and number of objects found were insufficient to show that there was no Planet Nine. A similar result was found when these two surveys were combined with a survey by Trujillo and Sheppard. These results differed from an analysis of discovery biases in the previously observed ETNOs by Mike Brown. He found that after observation biases were accounted for, the clustering of longitudes of perihelion of 10 known ETNOs would be observed only 1.2% of the time if their actual distribution was uniform. When combined with the odds of the observed clustering of the arguments of perihelion, the probability was 0.025%. A later analysis of the discovery biases of fourteen ETNOs used by Brown and Batygin determined the probability of the observed clustering of the longitudes of perihelion and the orbital pole locations to be 0.2%.

Simulations of 15 known objects evolving under the influence of Planet Nine also revealed differences from observations. Cory Shankman and his colleagues included Planet Nine in a simulation of many clones (objects with similar orbits) of 15 objects with semi-major axis a > 150 AU and perihelion ω > 30 AU. (Note: A link to the plots of the orbital evolution of all 15 is included in the arxiv version of the article.) While they observed alignment of the orbits opposite that of Planet Nine's for the objects with semi-major axis greater than 250 AU, clustering of the arguments of perihelion was not seen. Their simulations also showed that the perihelia of the ETNOs rose and fell smoothly, leaving many with perihelion distances between 50 and 70 AU where none had been observed, and predicted that there would be many other unobserved objects. These included a large reservoir of high-inclination objects that would have been missed due to most observations being at small inclinations, and a large population of objects with perihelia so distant that they would be too faint to observe. Many of the objects were also ejected from the Solar System after encountering the other giant planets. The large unobserved populations and the loss of many objects led Shankman et al. to estimate that the mass of the original population was tens of Earth masses, requiring that a much larger mass had been ejected during the early Solar System. (Note: Shankman et al. estimated the mass of this population at tens of Earth masses, and that hundreds to thousands of Earth masses would need to be ejected from the vicinity of the giant planets for this mass to have remained. In the Nice model 20–50 Earth masses is estimated to have been ejected, a significant mass is also ejected from the neighborhoods of the giant planets during their formation.) Shankman et al. concluded that the existence of Planet Nine is unlikely and that the currently observed alignment of the existing ETNOs is a temporary phenomenon that will disappear as more objects are detected.

=== Inclination instability in a massive disk ===
Ann-Marie Madigan and Michael McCourt postulate that an inclination instability in a distant massive belt hypothetically termed a Zderic-Madigan, or ZM belt is responsible for the alignment of the arguments of perihelion of the ETNOs. An inclination instability could occur in such a disk of particles with high eccentricity orbits (e > 0.6) around a central body, such as the Sun. The self-gravity of this disk would cause its spontaneous organization, increasing the inclinations of the objects and aligning the arguments of perihelion, forming it into a cone above or below the original plane. This process would require an extended time and significant mass of the disk, on the order of a billion years for a 1–10 Earth-mass disk. Ann-Marie Madigan argues that some already discovered trans-Neptunian objects like Sedna and 2012 VP113 may be members of this disk. If this is the case there would likely be thousands of similar objects in the region. Mike Brown considers Planet Nine a more probable explanation, noting that current surveys have not revealed a large enough scattered-disk to produce an "inclination instability". In Nice model simulations of the Solar System that included the self-gravity of the planetesimal disk an inclination instability did not occur. Instead, the simulation produced a rapid precession of the objects' orbits and most of the objects were ejected on too short of a timescale for an inclination instability to occur.

Madigan and colleagues have shown that the inclination instability would require 20 Earth masses in a disk of objects with semi-major axes of a few hundred AU. An inclination instability in this disk could also reproduce the observed gap in the perihelion distances of the extreme TNOs, and the observed apsidal alignment following the inclination instability given sufficient time. Simulations show that the Vera C. Rubin Observatory Legacy Survey of Space and Time (LSST) project should be able to supply strong evidence for or against the ZM belt.

=== Shepherding by a massive disk ===
Antranik Sefilian and Jihad Touma propose that a massive disk of moderately eccentric TNOs is responsible for the clustering of the longitudes of perihelion of the ETNOs. This disk would contain 10 Earth-mass of TNOs with aligned orbits and eccentricities that increased with their semi-major axes ranging from zero to 0.165. The gravitational effects of the disk would offset the forward precession driven by the giant planets so that the orbital orientations of its individual objects are maintained. The orbits of objects with high eccentricities, such as the observed ETNOs, would be stable and have roughly fixed orientations, or longitudes of perihelion, if their orbits were anti-aligned with this disk. Although Brown thinks the proposed disk could explain the observed clustering of the ETNOs, he finds it implausible that the disk could survive over the age of the Solar System. Batygin thinks that there is insufficient mass in the Kuiper belt to explain the formation of the disk, and asks "why would the protoplanetary disk end near 30 AU and restart beyond 100 AU?"

=== Planet in lower-eccentricity orbit ===
Proposed resonant objects for a > 150 AU, q > 40 AU
Body	Barycentric period (years)	Ratio
2013 GP136	1,830	9:1
2000 CR105	3,304	5:1
2012 VP113	4,300	4:1
474640 Alicanto	5,900	3:1
2010 GB174	6,500	5:2
90377 Sedna	≈ 11,400	3:2
Hypothetical planet	≈ 17,000	1:1 (by definition)

The Planet Nine hypothesis includes a set of predictions about the mass and orbit of the planet. An alternative hypothesis predicts a planet with different orbital parameters. Renu Malhotra, Kathryn Volk, and Xianyu Wang have proposed that the four detached objects with the longest orbital periods, those with perihelia beyond 40 AU and semi-major axes greater than 250 AU, are in n:1 or n:2 mean-motion resonances with a hypothetical planet. Two other objects with semi-major axes greater than 150 AU are also potentially in resonance with this planet. Their proposed planet could be on a lower eccentricity, low inclination orbit, with eccentricity e < 0.18 and inclination i ≈ 11°. The eccentricity is limited in this case by the requirement that close approaches of 2010 GB_{174} to the planet be avoided. If the ETNOs are in periodic orbits of the third kind, (Note: This is often referred (perhaps erroneously) to as Kozai within mean-motion resonance.) with their stability enhanced by the libration of their arguments of perihelion, the planet could be in a higher inclination orbit, with i ≈ 48°. Unlike Batygin and Brown, Malhotra, Volk and Wang do not specify that most of the distant detached objects would have orbits anti-aligned with the massive planet.

=== Alignment due to the Kozai mechanism ===
Trujillo and Sheppard argued in 2014 that a massive planet in a circular orbit with an average distance between 200 AU and 300 AU was responsible for the clustering of the arguments of perihelion of twelve TNOs with large semi-major axes. Trujillo and Sheppard identified a clustering near zero degrees of the arguments of perihelion of the orbits of twelve TNOs with perihelia greater than 30 AU and semi-major axes greater than 150 AU. After numerical simulations showed that the arguments of perihelion should circulate at varying rates, leaving them randomized after billions of years, they suggested that a massive planet in a circular orbit at a few hundred astronomical units was responsible for this clustering. This massive planet would cause the arguments of perihelion of the TNOs to librate about 0° or 180° via the Kozai mechanism so that their orbits crossed the plane of the planet's orbit near perihelion and aphelion, the closest and farthest points from the planet. In numerical simulations including a 2–15 Earth mass body in a circular low-inclination orbit between 200 AU and 300 AU the arguments of perihelia of Sedna and 2012 VP_{113} librated around 0° for billions of years (although the lower perihelion objects did not) and underwent periods of libration with a Neptune mass object in a high inclination orbit at 1,500 AU. Another process such as a passing star would be required to account for the absence of objects with arguments of perihelion near 180°. (Note: Assuming that the orbital elements of these objects have not changed, Jílková et al. proposed an encounter with a passing star might have helped acquire these objects – dubbed sednitos (ETNOs with q > 30 and a > 150) by them. They also predicted that the sednitos region is populated by 930 planetesimals and the inner Oort cloud acquired ≈440 planetesimals through the same encounter.)

These simulations showed the basic idea of how a single large planet can shepherd the smaller TNOs into similar types of orbits. They were basic proof of concept simulations that did not obtain a unique orbit for the planet as they state there are many possible orbital configurations the planet could have. Thus they did not fully formulate a model that successfully incorporated all the clustering of the ETNOs with an orbit for the planet. But they were the first to notice there was a clustering in the orbits of TNOs and that the most likely reason was from an unknown massive distant planet. Their work is very similar to how Alexis Bouvard noticed Uranus' motion was peculiar and suggested that it was likely gravitational forces from an unknown 8th planet, which led to the discovery of Neptune.

Raúl and Carlos de la Fuente Marcos proposed a similar model but with two distant planets in resonance. An analysis by Carlos and Raúl de la Fuente Marcos with Sverre J. Aarseth confirmed that the observed alignment of the arguments of perihelion could not be due to observational bias. They speculated that instead it was caused by an object with a mass between that of Mars and Saturn that orbited at some 200 AU from the Sun. Like Trujillo and Sheppard they theorized that the TNOs are kept bunched together by a Kozai mechanism and compared their behavior to that of Comet 96P/Machholz under the influence of Jupiter. They also struggled to explain the orbital alignment using a model with only one unknown planet, and therefore suggested that this planet is itself in resonance with a more-massive world about 250 AU from the Sun. In their article, Brown and Batygin noted that alignment of arguments of perihelion near 0° or 180° via the Kozai mechanism requires a ratio of the semi-major axes nearly equal to one, indicating that multiple planets with orbits tuned to the data set would be required, making this explanation too unwieldy.

=== Primordial black hole ===
In 2019, Jakub Scholtz and James Unwin proposed that a primordial black hole was responsible for the clustering of the orbits of the ETNOs. Their analysis of OGLE gravitational lensing data revealed a population of planetary mass objects in the direction of the galactic bulge more numerous than the local population of stars. They propose that instead of being free-floating planets, these objects are primordial black holes. Since their estimate of the size of this population is greater than the estimated population of free-floating planets from planetary formation models, they argue that the capture of a hypothetical primordial black hole would be more probable than the capture of a free-floating planet. This could also explain why an object responsible for perturbing the orbits of the ETNOs, if it exists, has yet to be seen. A detection method was proposed in the paper, stating that the black hole is too cold to be detected over the CMB, but interaction with surrounding dark matter would produce gamma rays detectable by the FERMILAT. Konstantin Batygin commented on this, saying while it is possible for Planet Nine to be a primordial black hole, there is currently not enough evidence to make this idea more plausible than any other alternative. Edward Witten proposed a fleet of probes accelerated by radiation pressure that could discover a Planet Nine primordial black hole's location, however Thiem Hoang and Avi Loeb showed that any signal would be dominated by noise from the interstellar medium. Amir Siraj and Avi Loeb proposed a method for the Vera C. Rubin Observatory to detect flares from any low-mass black hole in the outer Solar System, including a possible Planet Nine primordial black hole.

A 2023 paper suggests that Planet Nine may be an axion star; in that case, it would be difficult to distinguish from a primordial black hole.

=== Modified Newtonian dynamics ===
In 2023, it was shown that a gravity theory known as modified Newtonian dynamics (MOND), which attempts to explain galactic rotation without invoking dark matter, can provide an alternative explanation using secular approximations. It predicts that the major axes of the KBO orbits will be aligned with the direction toward the Galactic Center and that the orbits cluster in phase space, in agreement with observations.

== Detection attempts ==
=== Visibility and location ===
Due to its extreme distance from the Sun, Planet Nine would reflect little sunlight, potentially evading telescope sightings. It is expected to have an apparent magnitude fainter than 22, making it at least 600 times fainter than Pluto. (Note: The 8 meter Subaru Telescope has achieved a 27.7 magnitude photographic limit with a ten-hour exposure, which is about 100 times dimmer than Planet Nine is expected to be. For comparison, the Hubble Space Telescope has detected objects as faint as 31st magnitude with an exposure of about 2 million seconds (555 hours) during Hubble Ultra-Deep Field photography. Hubble's field of view is very narrow, as is the Keck Observatory's Large Binocular Telescope. Brown hopes to make a request for use of the Hubble Space Telescope the day the planet is spotted.) If Planet Nine exists and is close to perihelion, astronomers could identify it based on existing images. At aphelion, the largest telescopes would be required, but if the planet is currently located in between, many observatories could spot Planet Nine. Statistically, the planet is more likely to be close to its aphelion at a distance greater than 600 AU. This is because objects move more slowly when near their aphelion, in accordance with Kepler's second law. A 2019 study estimated that Planet Nine, if it exists, may be smaller and closer than originally thought. This would make the hypothetical planet brighter and easier to spot, with an apparent magnitude of 21–22. Observation and analysis of the orbital dynamics of Kuiper Belt objects constrain the possible orbital parameters of a Planet Nine, and at the current rate of new observations, University of Michigan professor Fred Adams believes enough data will have been gathered to pinpoint Planet Nine or rule out its existence by 2035.

=== Searches of existing data ===
The search of databases of stellar objects by Batygin and Brown has already excluded much of the sky along Planet Nine's predicted orbit. The remaining regions include the direction of its aphelion, where it would be too faint to be spotted by these surveys, and near the plane of the Milky Way, where it would be difficult to distinguish from the numerous stars. This search included the archival data from the Catalina Sky Survey to magnitude 21–22, Pan-STARRS to magnitude 21.5, and infrared data from the Wide-field Infrared Survey Explorer (WISE) satellite. In 2021, they also searched the first three years of data from the Zwicky Transient Facility (ZTF) without identifying Planet Nine. The search of the ZTF data alone has ruled out 56% of the parameter space for possible Planet Nine positions. As a result of ruling out mostly objects with small semi-major axes, the expected orbit of Planet Nine was pushed slightly further away.

Other researchers have been conducting searches of existing data. David Gerdes, who helped develop the camera used in the Dark Energy Survey, claims that software designed to identify distant Solar System objects such as 2014 UZ224 could find Planet Nine if it was imaged as part of that survey, which covered a quarter of the southern sky. Michael Medford and Danny Goldstein, graduate students at the University of California, Berkeley, are also examining archived data using a technique that combines images taken at different times. Using a supercomputer they will offset the images to account for the calculated motion of Planet Nine, allowing many faint images of a faint moving object to be combined to produce a brighter image. A search combining multiple images collected by WISE and NEOWISE data has also been conducted without detecting Planet Nine. This search covered regions of the sky away from the galactic plane at the "W1" wavelength (the 3.4 μm wavelength used by WISE) and is estimated to be able to detect a 10-Earth mass object out to 800–900 AU.

Malena Rice and Gregory Laughlin applied a targeted shift-stacking search algorithm to analyze data from TESS sectors 18 and 19 looking for Planet Nine and candidate outer Solar System objects. Their search generated no serious evidence for the presence of a distant planet, but it produced 17 new outer Solar System body candidates located at geocentric distances in the range 80–200 AU, that need follow-up observations with ground-based telescope resources for confirmation. Early results from a survey with WHT aimed at recovering these distant TNO candidates have failed to confirm two of them.

By 2022, a comparison between IRAS and AKARI data yielded no Planet Nine detection. It was noted that far-infrared data in the major portion of the sky are heavily contaminated by the emission from the galactic nebulae, making detection of Planet Nine thermal emission problematically close to the galactic plane or bulge.

A 2025 paper reported a possible detection of Planet Nine in Eridanus using IRAS and AKARI data.

=== Ongoing searches ===
Because the planet is predicted to be visible in the Northern Hemisphere, the primary search is expected to be carried out using the Subaru Telescope, which has both an aperture large enough to see faint objects and a wide field of view to shorten the search. Two teams of astronomers—Batygin and Brown, as well as Trujillo and Sheppard—are undertaking this search together, and both teams expect the search to take up to five years. Brown and Batygin initially narrowed the search for Planet Nine to roughly 2,000 square degrees of sky near Orion, a swath of space that Batygin thinks could be covered in about 20 nights by the Subaru Telescope. Subsequent refinements by Batygin and Brown have reduced the search space to 600–800 square degrees of sky. In December 2018, they spent four half–nights and three full nights observing with the Subaru Telescope.

A search for Planet Nine conducted in 2022 and 2023 at the Astrophysical Observatory of Javalambre returned no results.

=== Radiation ===
Although a distant planet such as Planet Nine would reflect little light, due to its large mass it would still be radiating the heat from its formation as it cools. At its estimated temperature of 47 K (−226.2 °C; −375.1 °F), the peak of its emissions would be at infrared wavelengths; its apparent magnitude in the V filter (540 nm wavelength) would be 21.7. This radiation signature could be detected by Earth-based submillimeter telescopes, such as ALMA, and a search could be conducted by cosmic microwave background experiments operating at mm wavelengths. (Note: It is estimated that to find Planet Nine, telescopes that can resolve a 30 mJy point source are needed, and that can also resolve an annual parallax motion of ≈5 arcminutes.) A search of part of the sky using archived data of the Atacama Cosmology Telescope has not detected Planet Nine. Jim Green of NASA's Science Mission Directorate is optimistic that it could be observed by the James Webb Space Telescope, the successor to the Hubble Space Telescope.

=== Citizen science ===
Backyard Worlds: Planet 9 is a NASA-funded citizen science project which is part of the Zooniverse web portal. It aims to discover new brown dwarfs, faint objects that are less massive than stars, some of which might be among the nearest neighbors of the Solar System, and might conceivably detect the hypothesized Planet Nine. The project's principal investigator is Marc Kuchner, an astrophysicist at NASA's Goddard Space Flight Center.

The Zooniverse "Catalina Outer Solar System Survey" project, operating from August 2020 to April 2023, was using archived data from the Catalina Sky Survey to search for TNOs. No new objects were discovered, but the project led to additional astrometry for existing objects.

== Attempts to predict location ==
=== Measurements of Saturn's orbit by the Cassini probe ===
Precise observations of Saturn's orbit using data from Cassini suggest that Planet Nine could not be in certain sections of its proposed orbit because its gravity would cause a noticeable effect on Saturn's position. This data neither proves nor disproves that Planet Nine exists.

An initial analysis by Fienga, Laskar, Manche, and Gastineau using Cassini data to search for Saturn's orbital residuals, small differences with its predicted orbit due to the Sun and the known planets, was inconsistent with Planet Nine being located with a true anomaly, the location along its orbit relative to perihelion, of −130° to −110° or −65° to 85°. The analysis, using Batygin and Brown's orbital parameters for Planet Nine, suggests that the lack of perturbations to Saturn's orbit is best explained if Planet Nine is located at a true anomaly of 117.8°+11°
−10°. At this location, Planet Nine would be approximately 630 AU from the Sun, with right ascension close to 2^{h} and declination close to −20°, in Cetus. In contrast, if the putative planet is near aphelion it would be located near right ascension 3.0^{h} to 5.5^{h} and declination −1° to 6°.

A later analysis of Cassini data by astrophysicists Matthew Holman and Matthew Payne tightened the constraints on possible locations of Planet Nine. Holman and Payne developed a more efficient model that allowed them to explore a broader range of parameters than the previous analysis. The parameters identified using this technique to analyze the Cassini data was then intersected with Batygin and Brown's dynamical constraints on Planet Nine's orbit. Holman and Payne concluded that Planet Nine is most likely to be located within 20° of RA = 40°, Dec = −15°, in an area of the sky near the constellation Cetus.

William Folkner, a planetary scientist at the Jet Propulsion Laboratory (JPL), has stated that the Cassini spacecraft was not experiencing unexplained deviations in its orbit around Saturn. An undiscovered planet would affect the orbit of Saturn, not Cassini. This could produce a signature in the measurements of Cassini, but JPL has seen no unexplained signatures in Cassini data.

=== Analysis of Pluto's orbit ===
An analysis in 2016 of Pluto's orbit by Holman and Payne found perturbations much larger than predicted by Batygin and Brown's proposed orbit for Planet Nine. Holman and Payne suggested three possible explanations: systematic errors in the measurements of Pluto's orbit; an unmodeled mass in the Solar System, such as a small planet in the range of 60–100 AU (potentially explaining the Kuiper cliff); or a planet more massive or closer to the Sun instead of the planet predicted by Batygin and Brown.

=== Orbits of nearly parabolic comets ===
An analysis of the orbits of comets with nearly parabolic orbits identifies five new comets with hyperbolic orbits that approach the nominal orbit of Planet Nine described in Batygin and Brown's initial article. If these orbits are hyperbolic due to close encounters with Planet Nine the analysis estimates that Planet Nine is currently near aphelion with a right ascension of 83–90° and a declination of 8–10°. Scott Sheppard, who is skeptical of this analysis, notes that many different forces influence the orbits of comets.

=== Occultations by Jupiter trojans ===
Malena Rice and Gregory Laughlin have proposed that a network of telescopes be built to detect occultations by Jupiter trojans. The timing of these occultations would provide precise astrometry of these objects enabling their orbits to be monitored for variations due to the tide from Planet Nine.

=== Possible encounter with interstellar meteor ===
In May 2022, it was suggested that the peculiar meteor CNEOS 2014-01-08 may have entered Earth-crossing orbit after a swing-by of Planet Nine. If that hypothesis is true, the trajectory back-tracing of CNEOS 2014-01-08 means Planet Nine may be currently located in the constellation of Aries, at right ascension 53±4.3°, and declination 9.2±1.3°.

== Attempts to predict the semi-major axis ==
An analysis by Sarah Millholland and Gregory Laughlin identified a pattern of commensurabilities (ratios between orbital periods of pairs of objects consistent with both being in resonance with another object) of the ETNOs. They identify five objects that would be near resonances with Planet Nine if it had a semi-major axis of 654 AU: Sedna (3:2), 474640 Alicanto (3:1), 2012 VP_{113} (4:1), 2000 CR105 (5:1), and 2001 FP185 (5:1). They identify this planet as Planet Nine but propose a different orbit with an eccentricity e ≈ 0.5, inclination i ≈ 30°, argument of perihelion ω ≈ 150°, and longitude of ascending node Ω ≈ 50° (the last differs from Brown and Batygin's value of 90°). (Note: A 3-D version of the image of the orbit and those of several ETNOs shown in figure 14 of "Constraints on Planet Nine's Orbit and Sky Position within a Framework of Mean-motion Resonances" is available.)

Carlos and Raúl de la Fuente Marcos also noted commensurabilities among the known ETNOs similar to that of the Kuiper belt, where accidental commensurabilities occur due to objects in resonances with Neptune. They found that some of these objects would be in 5:3 and 3:1 resonances with a planet that had a semi-major axis of ≈700 AU.

Three objects with smaller semi-major axes near 172 AU (2013 UH15, 2016 QV89 and (594337) 2016 QU_{89}) have also been proposed to be in resonance with Planet Nine. These objects would be in resonance and anti-aligned with Planet Nine if it had a semi-major axis of 315 AU, below the range proposed by Batygin and Brown. Alternatively, they could be in resonance with Planet Nine, but have orbital orientations that circulate instead of being confined by Planet Nine if it had a semi-major axis of 505 AU.

A later analysis by Elizabeth Bailey, Michael Brown, and Konstantin Batygin found that if Planet Nine is in an eccentric and inclined orbit the capture of many of the ETNOs in higher-order resonances and their chaotic transfer between resonances prevent the identification of Planet Nine's semi-major axis using current observations. They also determined that the odds of the first six objects observed being in N/1 or N/2 period ratios with Planet Nine are less than 5% if it has an eccentric orbit.

A 2025 study by Amir Siraj, Christopher F. Chyba, and Scott Tremaine using an expanded sample of 51 ETNOs to inform 300 simulations in the Rebound program, proposed new orbital characteristics for Planet Nine: that its semi-major axis is 290±30 AU, its eccentricity is 0.29 ± 0.13, and its inclination is roughly 6°. The authors noted that it would put Planet Nine in the field of view of the Rubin Observatory's early observations.

The recent discoveries of object 2017 OF201 is inconsistent with existence of Planet Nine: its orbit does not cluster with other TNOs. Similarly the orbit of Sedna-like TNO 2023 KQ_{14} conflicts with the clustering, and its stability over billions of years implies that any Planet Nine would need orbit the Sun at a farther distance of a = 500+170
−120 AU.

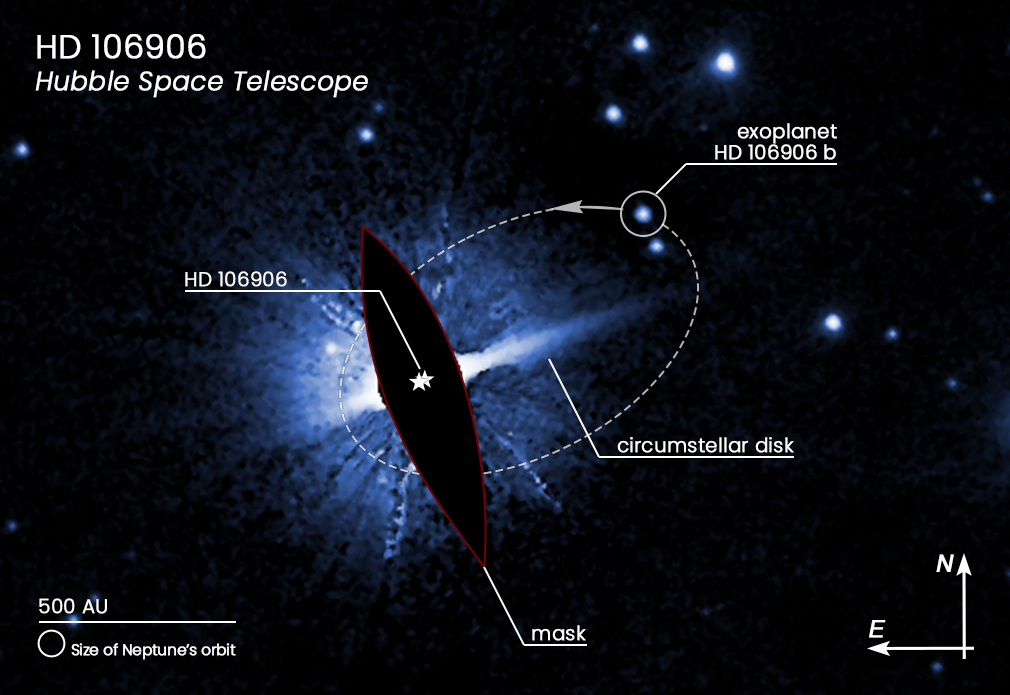
A possible orbit of the 11-Jupiter-mass exoplanet HD 106906 b. Its orbit may share similarities with that of Planet Nine.

In late 2020 it was discovered that HD 106906 b, a candidate exoplanet, had an eccentric orbit that took it outside the debris disk of its binary host stars. Its orbit appears to be similar to the predictions made for Planet Nine's semi-major axis and it may serve as a proxy for Planet Nine that helps explain how such planetary orbits evolve, although this exoplanet is well over ten times as massive as Jupiter.

== Naming ==
Planet Nine does not have an official name and will not receive one unless its existence is confirmed via imaging. Only two planets, Uranus and Neptune, have been discovered in the Solar System during recorded history. However, many minor planets, including dwarf planets such as Pluto, asteroids, and comets have been discovered and named. Consequently, there is a well-established process for naming newly discovered Solar System objects. If Planet Nine is observed, the International Astronomical Union will certify a name, with priority usually given to a name proposed by its discoverers. It is likely to be a name chosen from Roman or Greek mythology.

In their original article, Batygin and Brown simply referred to the object as "perturber", and only in later press releases did they use "Planet Nine". They have also used the names "Jehoshaphat" and "George" (a humorous variant of William Herschel's proposed name for Uranus) for Planet Nine. Brown stated: "We actually call it Phattie (Note: Most news outlets reported the name as Phattie (a slang term for "cool" or "awesome"; also, a marijuana cigarette) but The New Yorker quote cited above uses "fatty" in what appears to be a nearly unique variation. The apparently correct spelling has been substituted.) when we're just talking to each other." In 2018, Batygin also informally suggested, based on a petition on Change.org, to name the planet after singer David Bowie, and to name any potential moons of the planet after characters from Bowie's song catalogue, such as Ziggy Stardust and Major Tom.

Jokes have been made connecting "Planet Nine" to Ed Wood's 1959 science-fiction horror film Plan 9 from Outer Space. In connection with the Planet Nine hypothesis, the film title found its way into academic discourse. In 2016, an article titled Planet Nine from Outer Space about the hypothesized planet in the outer region of the Solar System was published in Scientific American. Several conference talks since then have used the same word play, as did a lecture by Mike Brown given in 2019.

Persephone, the wife of the deity Pluto, had been a popular name commonly used in science fiction for a planet beyond Neptune, most notably in the works of Arthur C. Clarke and Larry Niven. However, it is unlikely that Planet Nine or any other conjectured planet beyond Neptune will be given the name Persephone once its existence is confirmed, as it is already the name for asteroid 399 Persephone. In 2017 and again in 2025, physicist Lorenzo Iorio informally suggested to name the hypothetical planet as "Telisto", from the ancient Greek word "τήλιστος" for "farthest" or "most remote". Another classical mythological name, suggested by Jet Propulsion Laboratory physicist Makan Mohageg, is Chronos, after the Greek personification of time; Mohageg's method of finding Planet Nine would revolve around precision timing.

In 2018, planetary scientist Alan Stern objected to the name Planet Nine, saying, "It is an effort to erase Clyde Tombaugh's legacy and it's frankly insulting", suggesting the name Planet X until its discovery. He signed a statement with 34 other scientists saying, "We further believe the use of this term [Planet Nine] should be discontinued in favor of culturally and taxonomically neutral terms for such planets, such as Planet X, Planet Next, or Giant Planet Five." According to Brown, "'Planet X' is not a generic reference to some unknown planet, but a specific prediction of Lowell's which led to the (accidental) discovery of Pluto. Our prediction is not related to this prediction."

== See also ==
- Hypothetical planets of the Solar System
- Nemesis (hypothetical star)
- Planets beyond Neptune
- Tyche (hypothetical planet)
- Five-planet Nice model
- 2017 OF201
