= CFBDSIR 2149−0403 =

Celestial object in the constellation Aquarius

CFBDSIR J214947.2-040308.9
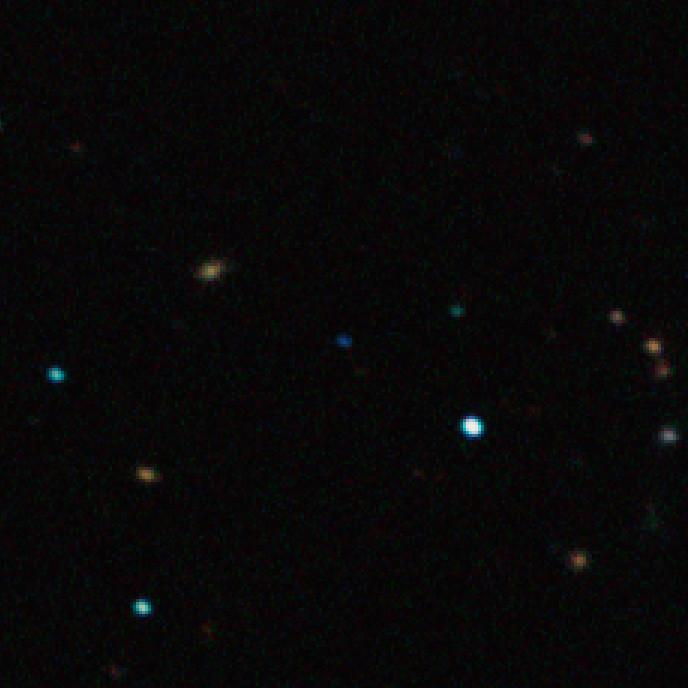
- The small blue dot (click to enlarge) in the center of this infrared image from the New Technology Telescope is CFBDSIR J214947.2-040308.9.

Discovery
- Discovered by: Philippe Delorme; Jonathan Gagné; Lison Malo; Céline Reylé; Étienne Artigau; Loïc Albert; Thierry Forveille; Xavier Delfosse; France Allard; Derek Homeier
- Discovery date: 2012
- Detection method: Direct imaging

Physical characteristics
- Mean radius: 1.07 or 0.811–1.271 R_{J}
- Mass: 2–40 M_{J}
- Surface gravity: log g = 3.5 – 4.5 cgs
- Temperature: 775 K (500 °C)
- Spectral type: T7

CFBDSIR 2149-0403 (full designation CFBDSIR J214947.2-040308.9) is a free-floating planetary-mass object or possibly a high-metallicity, low-mass brown dwarf in the constellation Aquarius. Originally, it was thought to be part of the AB Doradus moving group (ABDMG) as indicated by its position and proper motion, but the same team that discovered the object and conjectured its membership in the group has now rejected that hypothesis due to newer measurements. Without that membership, the age and mass of the object cannot be constrained.

== Discovery ==
CFBDSIR 2149-0403 was discovered by the Canada-France Brown Dwarfs Survey, a near-infrared sky survey, and confirmed by WISE data. Philippe Delorme, of the Institute of Planetology and Astrophysics of Grenoble in France and his team, including researchers at Université de Montréal in Canada, detected CFBDSIR2149's infrared signature using the Canada-France-Hawaii Telescope. They then examined the body's properties with the European Southern Observatory's Very Large Telescope in Chile.

== Distance ==
If this object is actually a rogue planet (which has not been decisively demonstrated), then it is among the closest that has ever been spotted. An estimate assuming it to be part of the AB Doradus moving group would result in a distance of 40±4 parsecs (130±13 light-years) from Earth.

In 2016, a parallax measurement of CFBDSIR 2149-0403 resulted in a distance of 54.6±5.4 parsecs (178±18 light-years).

== Age and characteristics ==
In the discovery paper, CFBDSIR 2149-0403 was claimed to possibly be a kinematic member of the AB Doradus moving group (ABDMG). The ABDMG appears to be similar in age to the Pleiades, which has a lithium-depletion boundary age of 130±20 Myr. If so, this object would be likely a free-floating planet with a mass lower than the limit for deuterium burning (roughly 13 M_{J}).

However, a subsequent analysis by the discoverers ruled out the possibility that it is part of this moving group (and other moving groups). Therefore, there is no way to constrain its mass and status unless assuming age values; estimates are either under 500 million years as a rogue planet with mass between 2 and 13 Jupiter masses, or else a two- to three-billion-year-old brown dwarf with mass between 2 and 40 Jupiter masses. The object shows signs of low gravity (brighter K band in the near-infrared), which could be attributable to youth.

Spectroscopic observations give CBFDSIR 2149-0403 a spectral type of T7, classifying it as a late T dwarf.

== Atmosphere ==
This video shows an artist's impression of the free-floating planet CFBDSIR J214947.2-040308.9.

Spectroscopy observations have found light absorption by gaseous methane and water in the object's atmosphere.

== See also ==
- GU Piscium b, an exoplanet orbiting GU Piscium at a distance of 2000 AU and period of 163,000 years in the AB Doradus moving group
- 2MASS J1119–1137, a similar binary rogue exoplanet discovered in 2016
