= 2013 UH15 =

Extreme trans-Neptunian object

2013 UH_{15}
Discovery
- Discovered by: (first observed only); Las Campanas Obs.
- Discovery site: Las Campanas Obs.
- Discovery date: 29 October 2013

Designations
- Minor planet category: TNO · ESDO distant · ETNO

Orbital characteristics
- Epoch 27 April 2019 (JD 2458600.5)
- Uncertainty parameter 5
- Observation arc: 1.96 yr (717 d)
- Aphelion: 305.39 AU
- Perihelion: 35.018 AU
- Semi-major axis: 170.20 AU
- Eccentricity: 0.7943
- Orbital period (sidereal): 2221 yr (811,042 d)
- Mean anomaly: 353.91°
- Mean motion: 0° 0^{m} 1.44^{s} / day
- Inclination: 26.090°
- Longitude of ascending node: 176.55°
- Argument of perihelion: 282.97°
- Neptune MOID: 12.9 AU

Physical characteristics
- Mean diameter: 128 km (est.); 130 km (est.)
- Geometric albedo: 0.08 (assumed); 0.09 (assumed)
- Absolute magnitude (H): 7.7

2013 UH_{15} is an extreme trans-Neptunian object from the extended scattered disc in the outermost region of the Solar System, approximately 130 kilometers (81 miles) in diameter. It was first observed on 29 October 2013, by astronomers at the Las Campanas Observatory in the southern Atacama Desert of Chile. The detached extended scattered disc object (ESDO) is on a highly eccentric orbit and belongs to the extreme trans-Neptunian objects.

== Orbit and classification ==
2013 UH_{15} orbits the Sun at a distance of 35.0–305 AU once every 2221 years (811,042 days; semi-major axis of 170.2 AU). Its orbit has an exceptionally high eccentricity of 0.79 and an inclination of 26° with respect to the ecliptic. The body's observation arc begins with its official first observation at Las Campanas in October 2013. It has a minimum orbital intersection distance with Neptune of 12.9 AU.

It belongs to a small group of detached objects with perihelion distances of 30 AU or more, and semi-major axes of 150 AU or more. These extreme trans-Neptunian objects (ETNOs) can not reach such orbits without some perturbing object, which leads to the speculation of Planet Nine.

== Numbering and naming ==
As of 2025, this minor planet has neither been numbered nor named by the Minor Planet Center. The official discoverers will be defined when the object is numbered.

== Physical characteristics ==
According to Johnston's Archive and to American astronomer Michael Brown, 2013 UH_{15} measures 128 and 130 kilometers in diameter based on an assumed albedo of 0.09 and 0.08, respectively. Due to its small size, it is listed as "probably not" a dwarf planet (100–200 km) on Michael Brown's website, which uses a 5-class taxonomic system that ranges from "nearly certainly" to "possibly" for potential dwarf planet candidates. As of 2018, no rotational lightcurve has been obtained from photometric observations. The body's rotation period, pole and shape remain unknown.

== See also ==
- List of unnumbered trans-Neptunian objects § 2013 UH15
