= AB Doradus =

Pre-main sequence star system in the constellation Dorado

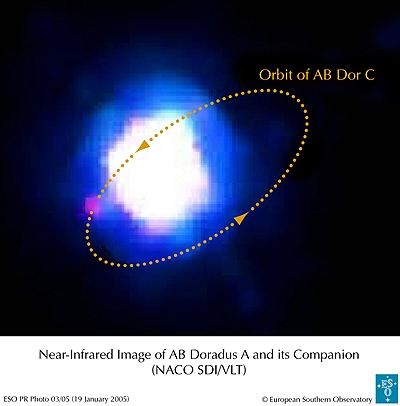
- AB Doradus with the orbit of C in yellow

Observation data Epoch J2000 Equinox ICRS
- Constellation: Dorado
- Right ascension: 05^{h} 28^{m} 44.8489^{s}
- Declination: −65° 26′ 54.946″
- Apparent magnitude (V): 6.98−7.06 / 13.0

Characteristics

AB Dor AC
- Spectral type: K0V + M8
- U−B color index: +0.37
- B−V color index: +0.86±0.02
- Variable type: Flare star

AB Dor B
- Spectral type: M5 + M5-6

Astrometry
Radial velocity (R_{v})	32.40 ± 2.2 km/s
Proper motion (μ)	RA: 33.16 mas/yr Dec.: 150.83 mas/yr
Parallax (π)	65.93±0.57 mas
Distance	49.5 ± 0.4 ly (15.2 ± 0.1 pc)
Absolute magnitude (M_{V})	5.86

Orbit
Primary	AB Dor Ba
Name	AB Dor Bb
Period (P)	0.986 ± 0.008 yr
Semi-major axis (a)	0.052 ± 0.002″
Eccentricity (e)	0.6 ± 0.1
Inclination (i)	121 ± 5°
Longitude of the node (Ω)	270 ± 15°
Periastron epoch (T)	2003.68 ± 0.05
Argument of periastron (ω) (secondary)	54 ± 20°

Orbit
Primary	AB Dor A
Name	AB Dor C
Period (P)	12.895 yr
Semi-major axis (a)	0.304″
Eccentricity (e)	0.281
Inclination (i)	63.0°
Longitude of the node (Ω)	159.2°
Periastron epoch (T)	B 1991.822
Argument of periastron (ω) (secondary)	157.3°

Details

AB Dor A
Mass	0.86 M_{☉}
Radius	0.96±0.06 R_{☉}
Temperature	5,250 K
Rotation	0.5148 days
Age	50 Myr

AB Dor C
Mass	0.090±0.008 M_{☉}
Radius	0.178 (Note: Applying the Stefan–Boltzmann law with a nominal solar effective temperature of 5,772 K: $$\sqrt{\biggl(\frac{5,772}{2,925}\biggr)^4 \cdot 0.0021} = 0.1784\ R_\odot$$.) R_{☉}
Luminosity	0.0021±0.0005 L_{☉}
Temperature	2925+170 −145 K
Age	25–120 Myr

AB Dor Ba
Mass	0.28 ± 0.05 M_{☉}

AB Dor Bb
Mass	0.25 ± 0.05 M_{☉}

Other designations
- AB Dor, CD−65° 332, HD 36705, HIP 25647

Database references
SIMBAD	data
ARICNS	data

AB Doradus is a pre-main-sequence quadruple star system in the constellation Dorado. The primary is a flare star that shows periodic increases in activity.

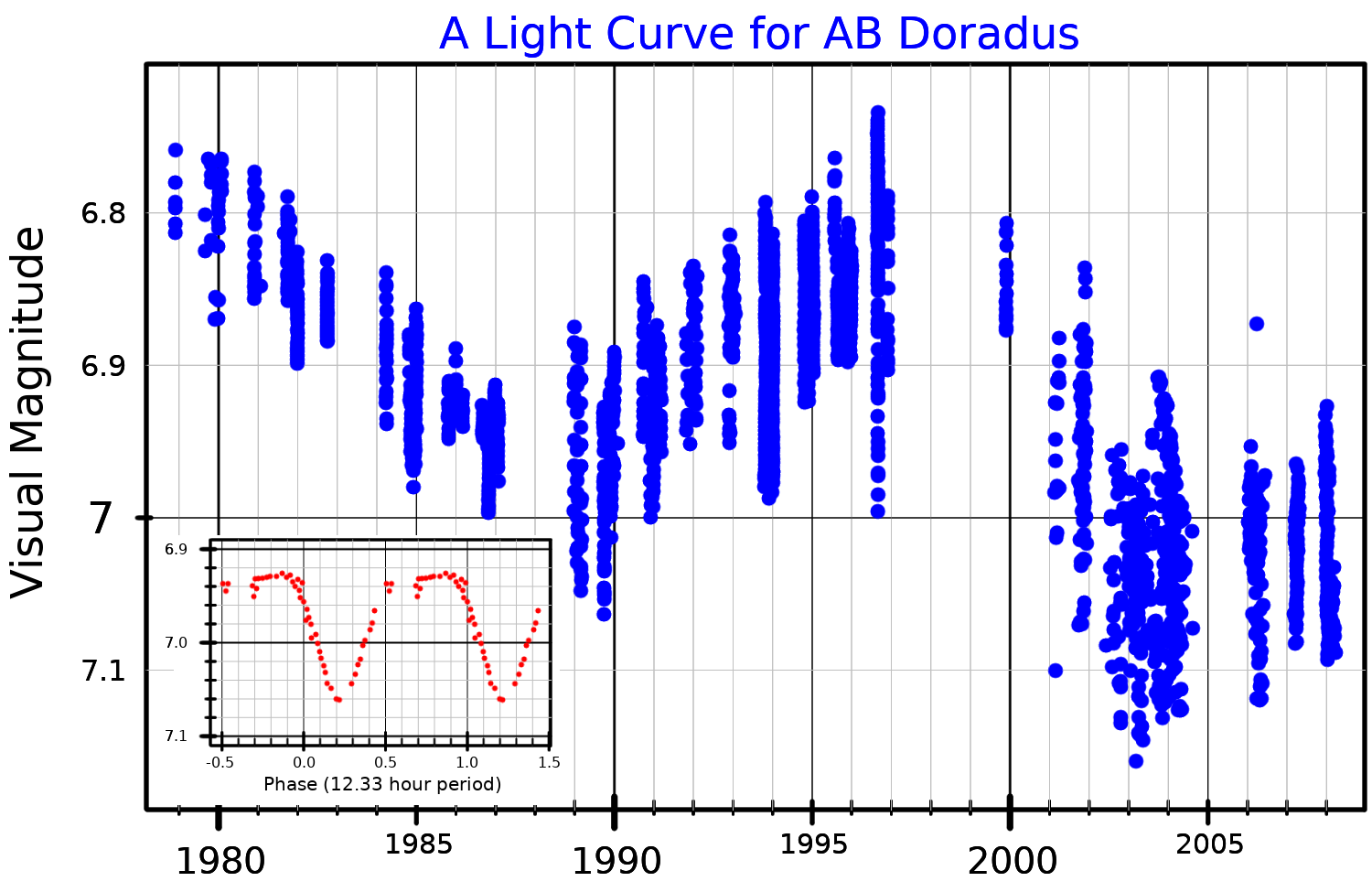
A visual band light curve for AB Doradus. The main plot shows the long-term variability, and the inset shows the periodic variability (as of Oct/Nov 1989). Adapted from Innis et al. (2008) and Anders (1990).

The primary star in this system spins at a rate 50 times that of the Sun, and consequently has a strong magnetic field. It has a greater number of star spots than the Sun. These can cause the luminosity of the star to appear to vary over each orbital cycle. Measurements of the spin rate of this star at its equator have shown that it varies over time due to the effect of this magnetic field.

The system has four components consisting of a pair of binary star systems separated by an angle of about 9″. The binary star AB Doradus Ba/Bb orbits the primary AB Doradus A at an average distance of 135 astronomical units (AUs). AB Doradus C is a closer in companion that orbits the primary at a distance of 5.1 AU, and has an orbital period of 11.75 years.

AB Doradus C is among the lowest-mass stars ever found. At an estimated mass 93 times Jupiter's (0.0887 solar mass), it is near the limit of 75–83 Jupiter masses below which it would be classified as a brown dwarf. However, recent evidence indicates that the star may actually be a binary system itself, consisting of two brown dwarfs, AB Doradus Ca/Cb, with 72 and 13 Jupiter masses, respectively.

This system is a member of the eponymous AB Doradus Moving Group, a loose stellar association of about 30 stars that are all approximately the same age and moving in the same general direction. It is likely that all of these stars formed in the same giant molecular cloud.
