= HD 106906 =

Binary star in the constellation Crux

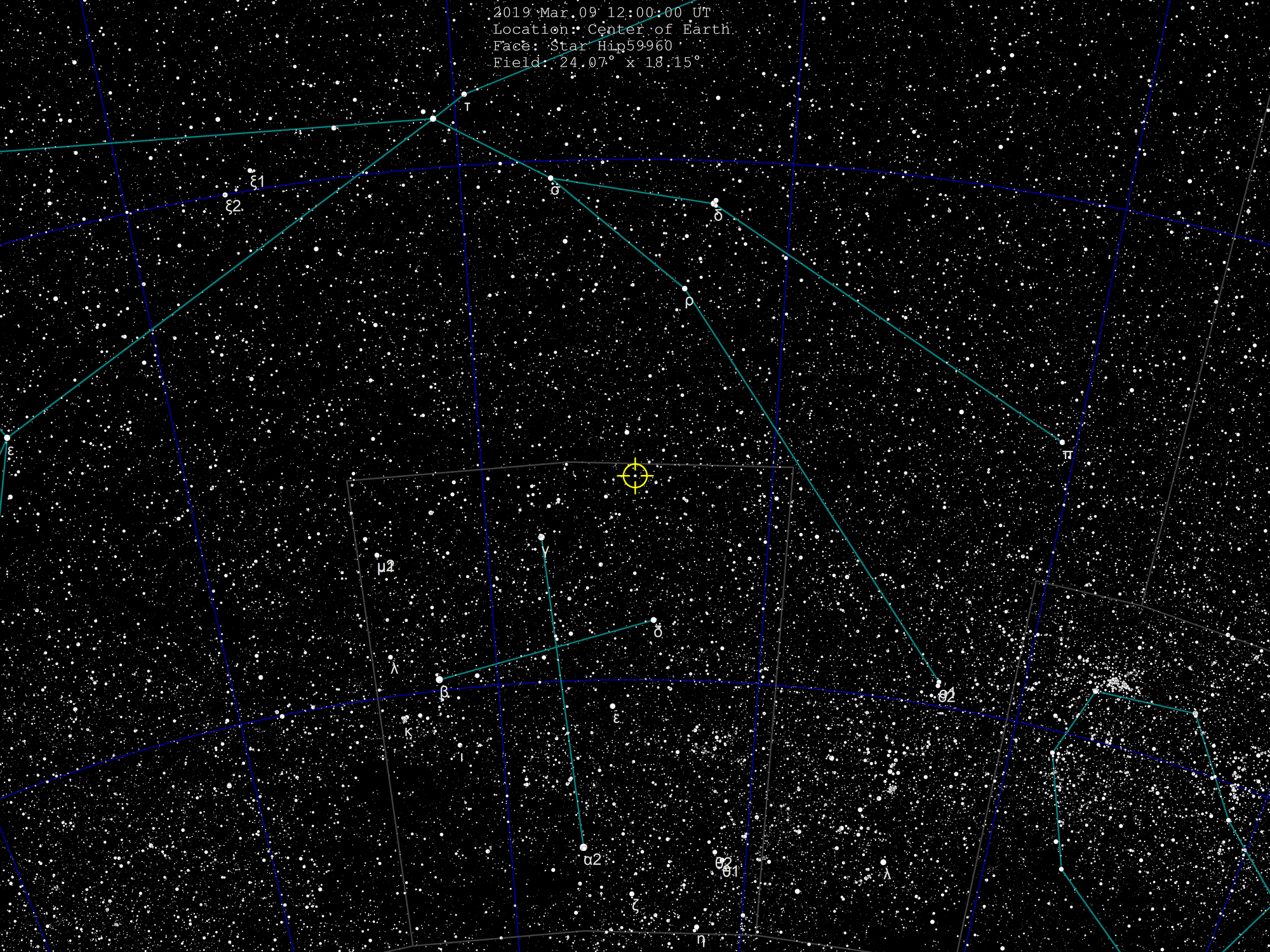
- Star map shows star position on the northern edge of the constellation Crux

Observation data Epoch J2000.0 Equinox ICRS
- Constellation: Crux
- Right ascension: 12^{h} 17^{m} 53.191430^{s}
- Declination: −55° 58′ 31.8904″
- Apparent magnitude (V): 7.80

Characteristics
- Evolutionary stage: pre-main sequence
- Spectral type: F5 V
- B−V color index: 0.458±0.003

Astrometry
Radial velocity (R_{v})	+10.2±1.7 km/s
Proper motion (μ)	RA: −39.014 mas/yr Dec.: −12.872 mas/yr
Parallax (π)	9.6774±0.0429 mas
Distance	337 ± 1 ly (103.3 ± 0.5 pc)
Absolute magnitude (M_{V})	+2.99

Details

A
Mass	1.35 M_{☉}
Age	13±2 Myr

B
Mass	1.35 M_{☉}
Age	13±2 Myr

Other designations
- CD−55°4537, HD 106906, HIP 59960, SAO 239819, 2MASS J12175319-5558319

Database references
SIMBAD	data

HD 106906 is a binary star system in the southern constellation of Crux. It is too faint to be visible to the naked eye, having a combined apparent visual magnitude of 7.80. The distance to this system is approximately 337 light years based on parallax, and it is receding from the Sun with a radial velocity of +10 km/s. It is a member of the Lower Centaurus–Crux group of the Scorpius–Centaurus OB association of co-moving stars.

This is a double-lined spectroscopic binary system consisting of two F-type main-sequence stars with similar masses and a matching stellar classification of F5 V. Their orbital period is less than 100 days.

== Planetary system ==
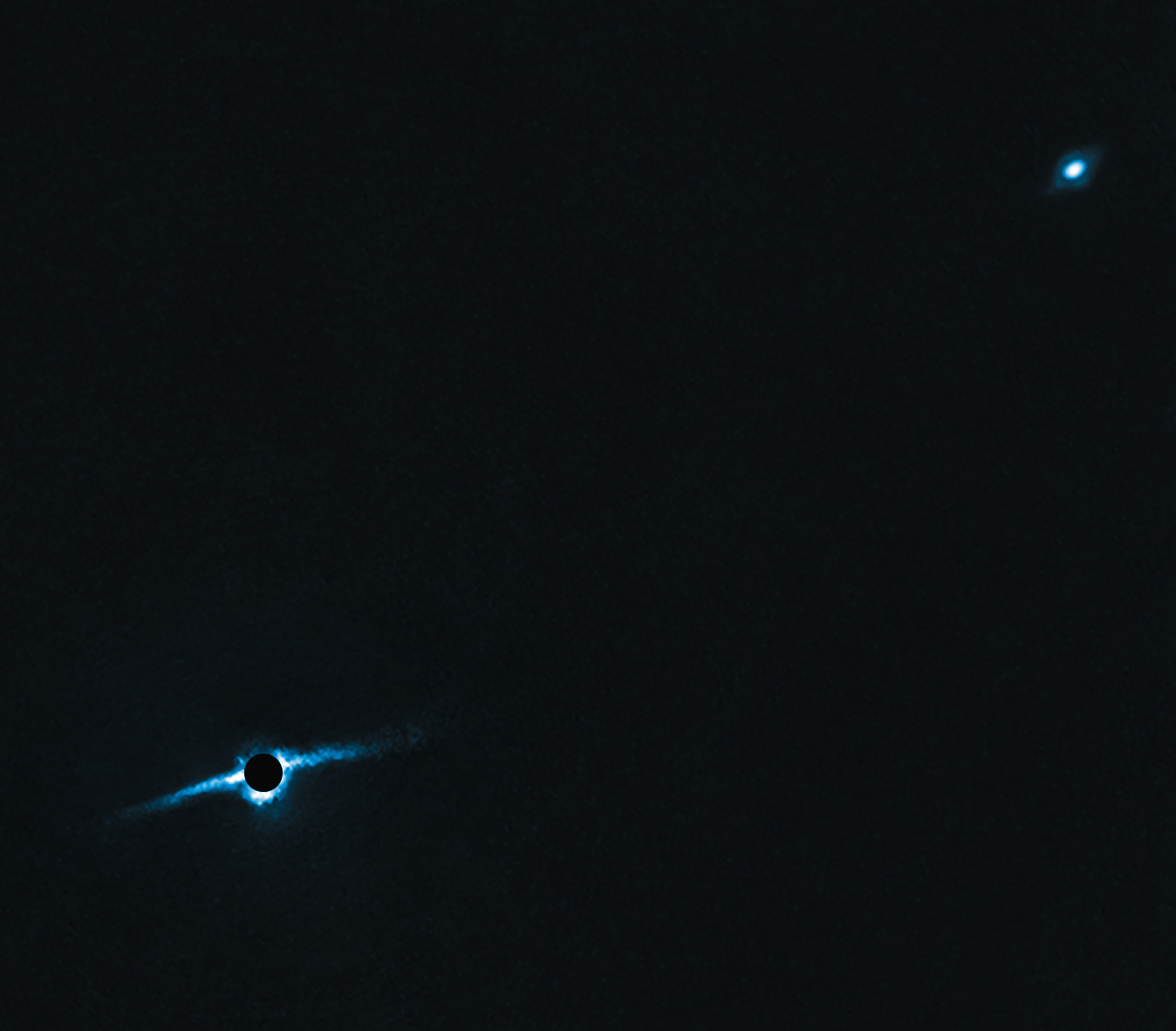
Edge-on disc of gas and dust present around the binary star system HD 106906

A distant circumbinary planet—HD 106906 b—is orbiting the pair at a projected separation of 732±30 AU with a period of at least 3,000 years. An infrared excess around the binary is coming from a circumstellar debris disk that is being viewed edge-on. This has a pronounced asymmetrical shape, extending 120 AU on the east side and out to 550 AU to the west. Planetary orbit is inclined to the debris disk by 39^{+20}_{−15} degrees, and planet itself is visible nearly pole-on, having a large axial tilt.

In 2026, a second companion, either a planet or brown dwarf orbiting much closer than HD 106906 b, was found using astrometry. The discovery of such a companion highligths the necessity of revising the orbital evolution of this system.

The HD 106906 planetary system
Companion (in order from star)	Mass	Semimajor axis (AU)	Orbital period (years)	Eccentricity	Inclination (°)	Radius
c	3–20 M_{J}	3–10	—	—	—	—
debris disk	65–550 AU				84.65 ± 0.35°	—
b	11 ± 2 M_{J}	~732 ± 30 AU	> 3000	—	64	1.54 ^{+0.04}_{−0.05} R_{J}
