= AB Doradus moving group =

Kinematic group of stars

AB Doradus Moving Group is a group of about 30 associated stars that are moving through space together with the star AB Doradus. A moving group is distinguished by its members having about the same age, composition (or metallicity) and motion through space. Hence they most likely formed in the same location.

This group is located about 20 parsecs from the Earth and is the closest known co-moving group. The average space velocity of this group has components of U = −8, V = −27 and W = −14 km/s. About 10 of these stars form a nuclear group within a volume roughly 10 parsecs across.

The proximity of this moving group makes it useful for studies of shared stellar properties, as well as detection of companions through direct imaging. These can be used for refinement of young stellar models, for example.

== Age ==
The age of the AB Dor Moving Group has been somewhat controversial, with quoted ages in the range of ~50 to ~150 Myr; recent work, however, seems to have converged on an age similar to that of the Pleiades (130 ± 20 Myr). Zuckerman & Song (2004) estimated an age of ~50 Myr for the AB Dor Moving Group, however this was only via comparison of age indicators to a single other group (the ~30 Myr-old Tucana group, which itself has a poorly determined age). Luhman, Stauffer, & Mamajek (2005) demonstrated that the AB Dor Moving Group and Pleiades open cluster have a similar pattern of Lithium depletion and color-magnitude diagram positions amongst their low-mass members, suggesting that the two groups were of similar age (~100-125 Myr). They also proposed that the similarity in space motions between the AB Dor group and Pleiades (within 2 km/s) hinted that the AB Dor group may have formed in the same star-forming complex that spawned the Pleiades cluster. Ortega et al. (2007) integrated the past Galactic orbits of the AB Dor Moving Group and the Pleiades cluster, and concluded that they were in close proximity 119 ± 20 Myr ago. The similarity of this kinematic age with the modern age of the Pleiades determined from the Lithium-depletion boundary method (130 ± 20 Myr), led these investigators to conclude that AB Dor Moving Group and Pleiades likely formed around the same time in the same star-forming complex.

In 2013, a color-magnitude analysis of the low-mass stars in the group by Barenfeld et al. (2013) found that the members of spectral type K6 and hotter appeared to be on the main sequence, whereas the cooler M-type stars are pre-main sequence - consistent with a lower limit on the age of the AB Dor Moving Group of >110 Myr. The latter study also concluded that some members of the moving group outside of the nucleus do not share a common chemical composition, implying that they are unrelated interlopers.

== Substellar members ==
- AB Doradus, the main star of the namesake moving group is suspected to contain 2 brown dwarfs namely AB Doradus Ca/Cb
- Bowler et al. (2012) discovered a ~30 Jupiter mass L0-type companion to the AB Dor Moving Group member 1RXS J235133.3+312720.
- In 2011, a brown dwarf with mass 31±8 M_{J} was discovered orbiting around the star CD−35 2722.
- In 2012, a group of astronomers announced the discovery of CFBDSIR 2149−0403, a purported "free-floating planet" between 4 and 7 times the mass of Jupiter that appeared to be part of the moving group. At the time of its discovery, it was the closest known rogue planet; there are a few other previously detected objects which might also be rogue planets, but astronomers are uncertain as to whether they are planets or brown dwarfs because their ages are unknown. These previous discoveries were discussed in the research paper in which CFBDSIR 2149-0403 was announced. At this time, however, there is no evidence that CFBDSIR 2149−0403 formed like a planet, and its status as a low-mass brown dwarf appears to be uncontroversial.
- In 2013, a superjovian planet was found orbiting a red dwarf 2MASS J01225093-2439505.
- In 2014, exoplanet GU Piscium b was discovered orbiting GU Piscium at a distance of 2000 AU and period of 80,000 years.
- In 2016, a superjovian planet was discovered orbiting 2MASS J22362452+4751425.

== See also ==
- List of nearby stellar associations and moving groups
- β Pictoris moving Group
- TW Hydrae association
- Ursa Major Moving Group
