= (148209) 2000 CR105 =

Trans-Neptunian object

(148209) 2000 CR_{105}
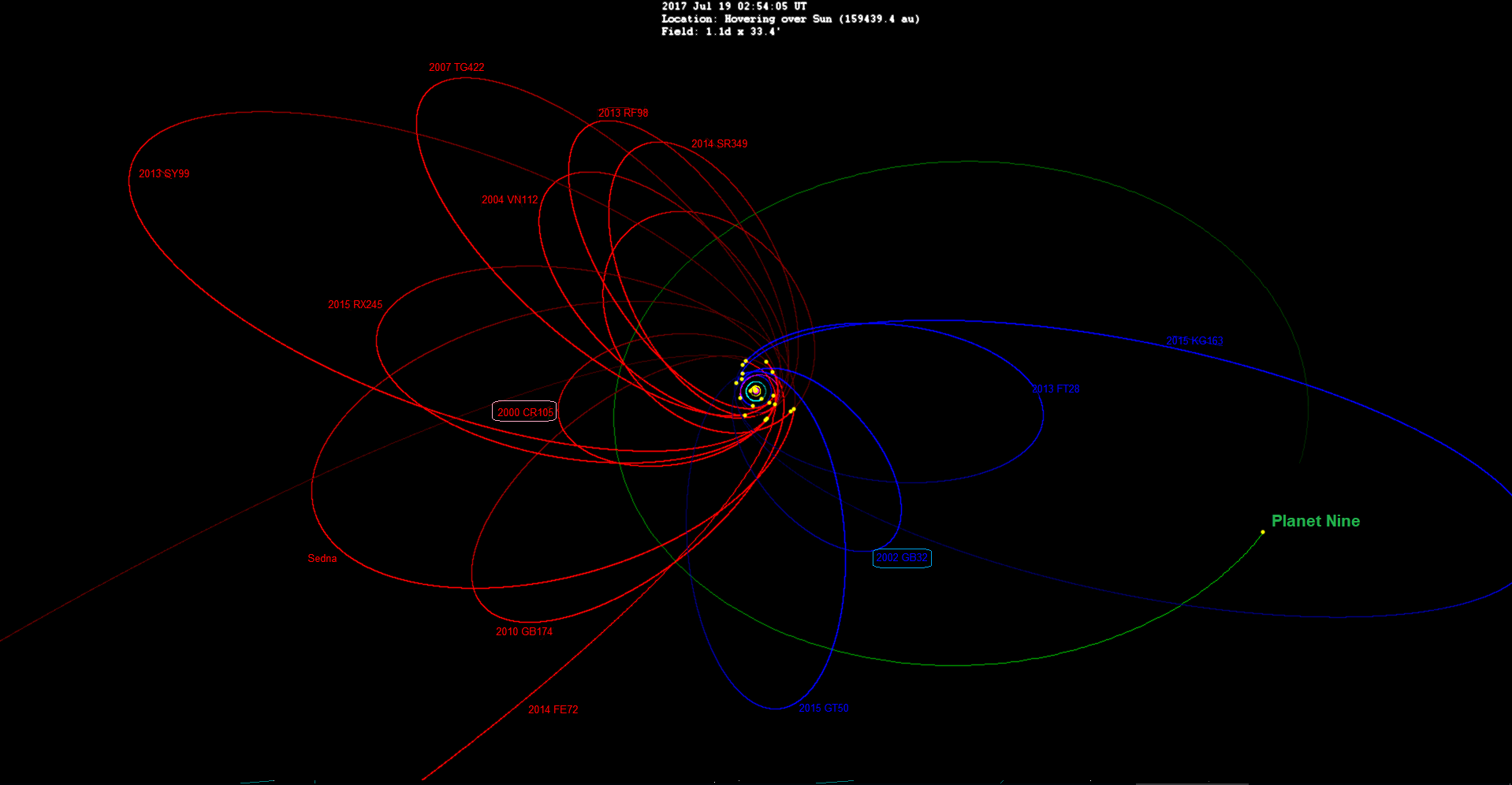
- 2000 CR_{105} is seen as a smaller orbit center left in red with hypothetical Planet Nine in green

Discovery
- Discovered by: Marc W. Buie
- Discovery date: 6 February 2000

Designations
- Alternative designations: (148209) 2000 CR_{105}
- Minor planet category: TNO; E-SDO; (detached object)

Orbital characteristics
- Epoch 21 November 2025 (JD 2461000.5)
- Uncertainty parameter 3
- Observation arc: 5547 days (15.19 yr)
- Earliest precovery date: 6 February 2000
- Aphelion: 413.29 AU (61.827 Tm) (Q)
- Perihelion: 44.117 AU (6.5998 Tm) (q)
- Semi-major axis: 228.70 AU (34.213 Tm) (a)
- Eccentricity: 0.8071 (e)
- Orbital period (sidereal): 3458.7±15.5 yr (1263306±5666 d); 3305 yr (barycentric)
- Mean anomaly: 6.289° (M)
- Mean motion: 0° 0^{m} 1.026^{s} / day (n)
- Inclination: 22.713° (i)
- Longitude of ascending node: 128.212° (Ω)
- Argument of perihelion: 316.919° (ω)

Physical characteristics
- Dimensions: 327 km; 223 km?
- Geometric albedo: 0.04 (assumed)
- Spectral type: Blue; B–V = 0.771±0.082; V–R = 0.509±0.048
- Apparent magnitude: 24.38
- Absolute magnitude (H): 6.14

(148209) 2000 CR_{105} is a trans-Neptunian object. Considered a detached object, it orbits the Sun in a highly eccentric orbit every 3,305 years at an average distance of 222 astronomical units (AU).

== Description ==
Mike Brown's website lists it with a diameter of 327 kilometres (203 mi) based on an assumed albedo of 0.04. The albedo is expected to be low because the object has a blue (neutral) color. However, if the albedo is higher, the object could easily be half that size.

2000 CR_{105} and Sedna differ from scattered-disc objects in that they are not within the gravitational influence of the planet Neptune even at their perihelion distances (closest approaches to the Sun). It is something of a mystery as to how these objects came to be in their current, far-flung orbits. Several hypotheses have been put forward:

- They were pulled from their original positions by a passing star.
- They were pulled from their original positions by a very distant, and as-yet-undiscovered (albeit unlikely), giant planet.
- They were pulled from their original positions by an undiscovered companion star orbiting the Sun such as Nemesis.
- They were captured from another planetary system during a close encounter early in the Sun's history. According to Kenyon and Bromley, there is a 15% probability that a star like the Sun had an early close encounter and a 1% probability that outer planetary exchanges would have happened. 2000 CR_{105} is estimated to be 2–3 times more likely to be a captured planetary object than Sedna.

2000 CR_{105} is the first object discovered in the Solar System to have a semi-major axis exceeding 150 AU, a perihelion beyond Neptune, and an argument of perihelion of 340°±55°. It may be influenced by Planet Nine.

== See also ==
- Planets beyond Neptune
- List of Solar System objects by greatest aphelion
