= GU Piscium b =

Planetary mass companion orbiting GU Piscium

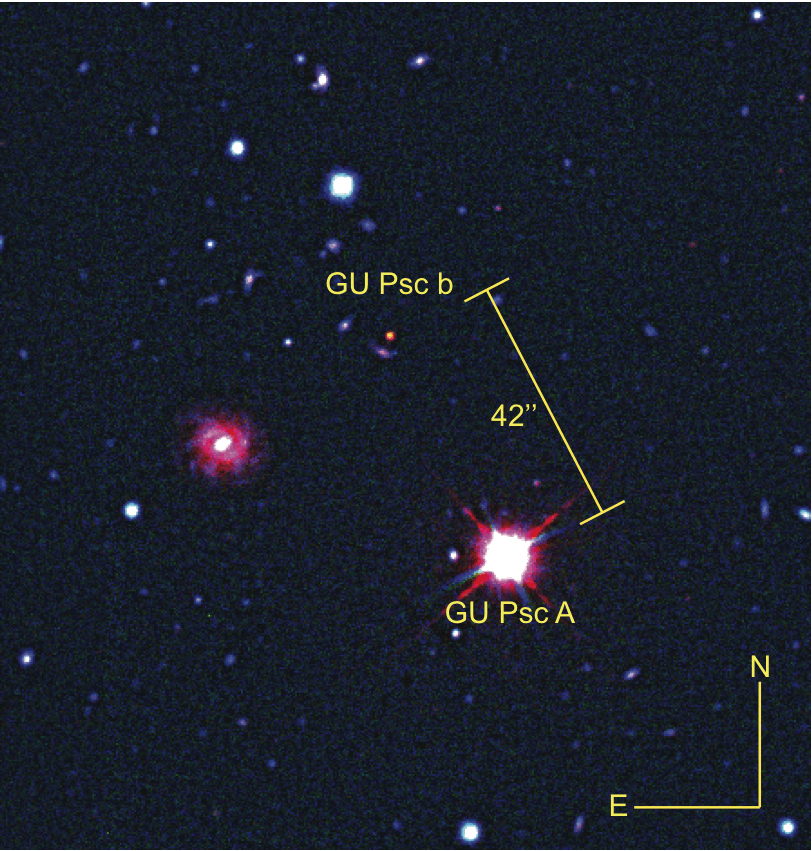
- The planet GU Piscium b and its star GU Piscium composed of visible and infrared images from the Gemini South telescope and an infrared image from the CFHT. Because infrared light is invisible to the naked eye, astronomers use a colour code in which infrared light is represented by the colour red. GU Piscium b is brighter in infrared than in other filters, which is why it appears red in this image.

Discovery
- Discovered by: Marie-Eve Naud, Étienne Artigau, Lison Malo, Loïc Albert, René Doyon, David Lafrenière, Jonathan Gagné, Didier Saumon, Caroline V. Morley, France Allard, Derek Homeier, Charles A. Beichman, Christopher R. Gelino, Anne Boucher

Orbital characteristics
- Semi-major axis: 2000 AU
- Orbital period (sidereal): 163,000 years (Note: There is a mistake in the press release Archived May 21, 2014, at the Wayback Machine, that was repeated by various media. Using Kepler's 3rd law and assuming a circular orbit with a mass of 0.3 times the mass of the Sun for the star, the correct estimation of the period for this planet is ~163,000yr, not 80,000yr.)
- Star: GU Piscium

Physical characteristics
- Mean radius: 1.24±0.04 R_{J}
- Mass: 9–13 M_{J}
- Temperature: 981±57 K

GU Piscium b (GU Psc b) is a directly imaged planetary-mass companion orbiting the star GU Piscium, with an extremely large orbit of 2,000 AU (3.0×10^{11} km), and an apparent angular separation of 42 arc seconds. The planet is located at right ascension 01^{h} 12^{m} 36.48^{s} declination +17° 04′ 31.8″ at a distance of 48 pc (160 ly).

== Properties ==
An orbital revolution around its parent star (which is 1/3 the mass of the Sun) or "year", would take approximately 163,000 years to complete, considering a circular orbit with 2000 AU as the semi-major axis. It is a gas giant located in the constellation of Pisces, 155 light-years from the Solar System, and estimated to have a mass nine to thirteen times that of Jupiter, and a surface temperature of 1000 K.

It is a relatively young stellar system, part of the AB Doradus moving group of ca. 30 main stars created from the same molecular cloud less than 100 million years ago, and the only one found among the 90 stars of the group examined.

The spectral type was initially determined to be T3.5 ±1. This team also found that it is a weak binary candidate. A later work found it more similar to known tight binary T-dwarfs and assigned a spectral type of T2+T8. This object was found to be variable. First a study with the Canada-France-Hawaii Telescope found a rotation period of around 6 hours and an amplitude of 4 ±1% on 2014 October 11. On two other occasions this object was not variable. Later the variability was studied with Hubble Space Telescope WFC3 at 1.1-1.67 μm. GU Psc b showed variability with an amplitude of 2.7% and a rotation period of around 8 hours. The largely gray light curve modulation show that this object has heterogeneous clouds.

== Discovery ==
The discovery was made by an international team of astronomers led by Marie-Eve Naud of the Université de Montréal in Quebec, combining observations from telescopes of the Gemini Observatory, the Mont Mégantic Observatory (OMM), the Canada–France–Hawaii Telescope (CFHT) and the W. M. Keck Observatory. Its large distance away from its parent star permitted the use of combined infrared and visible light images to detect it, a technique astronomers hope to reproduce to discover much closer planets with the Gemini Planet Imager (GPI) in Chile.

Near-infrared spectroscopy of the companion was obtained with the GNIRS spectrograph on the Gemini North Telescope, which shows evidence of low surface gravity confirming the planet's youth. Weak methane absorption was detected in H and K band corresponding to a spectral type of T3.5.

== See also ==
- List of exoplanet extremes
- List of directly imaged exoplanets
- CFBDSIR 2149−0403 - Possible rogue planet in the AB Doradus moving group
- WD 0806−661 B
