= GU Piscium =

Star in the constellation Pisces

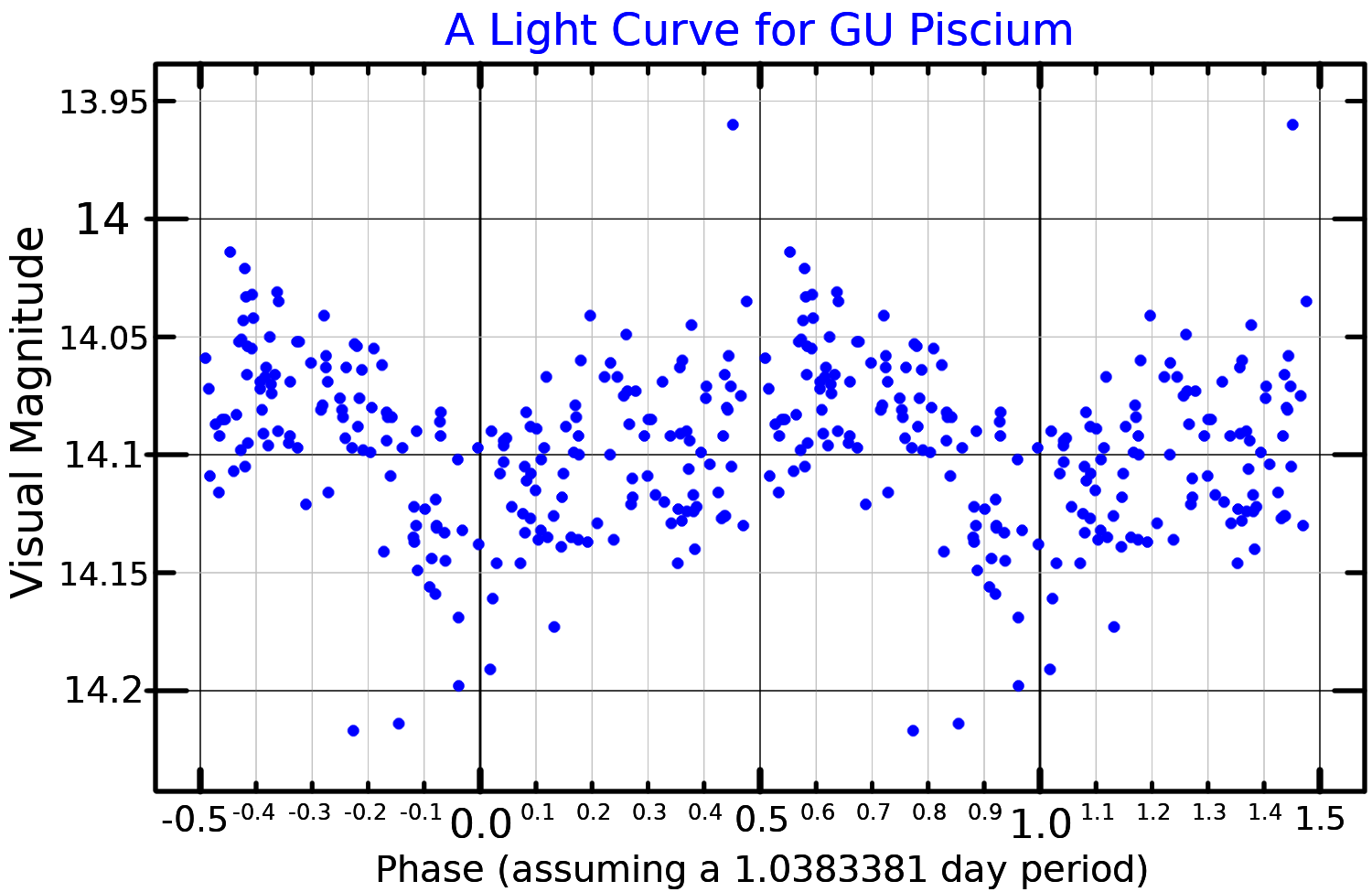
- A visual band light curve for GU Piscium, plotted from ASAS-SN data

Observation data Epoch J2000.0 Equinox J2000.0
- Constellation: Pisces
- Right ascension: 01^{h} 12^{m} 35.0519^{s}
- Declination: +17° 03′ 55.571″
- Apparent magnitude (V): 12.96 - 13.24

Characteristics
- Evolutionary stage: main sequence
- Spectral type: M3
- Variable type: RS CVn

Astrometry
Radial velocity (R_{v})	−1.5±0.5 km/s
Proper motion (μ)	RA: 96.642±0.127 mas/yr Dec.: −100.704±0.107 mas/yr
Parallax (π)	21.0019±0.0721 mas
Distance	155.3 ± 0.5 ly (47.6 ± 0.2 pc)

Details
Radius	0.54±0.04 R_{☉}
Surface gravity (log g)	4.75±0.07 cgs
Temperature	3250±32 K
Metallicity	−0.25±0.19
Rotational velocity (v sin i)	23.7±2.2 km/s

Other designations
- 1SWASP J011235.03+170355.7, 1RXS J011235.6+170401, GU Psc, 2MASS J01123504+1703557

Database references
SIMBAD	data

GU Piscium is a star in the constellation Pisces. An RS Canum Venaticorum variable, it ranges from magnitude 12.96 to 13.24 over 1.04 days. It is 48 Parsecs (155 light-years) distant from Earth. This star is also believed to be a member of the AB Doradus moving group with a membership probability of 96.9%.

== Planetary system ==
In 2014, it was found to have a gas giant planet—GU Piscium b—orbiting it.

The GU Piscium planetary system
Companion (in order from star)	Mass	Semimajor axis (AU)	Orbital period (years)	Eccentricity	Inclination (°)	Radius
b	9–13 M_{J}	2000	—	—	—	—
