= Effects of Planet Nine on trans-Neptunian objects =

The hypothetical Planet Nine would modify the orbits of extreme trans-Neptunian objects via a combination of effects. On very long timescales exchanges of angular momentum with Planet Nine cause the perihelia of anti-aligned objects to rise until their precession reverses direction, maintaining their anti-alignment, and later fall, returning them to their original orbits. On shorter timescales mean-motion resonances with Planet Nine provides phase protection, which stabilizes their orbits by slightly altering the objects' semi-major axes, keeping their orbits synchronized with Planet Nine's and preventing close approaches. The inclination of Planet Nine's orbit weakens this protection, resulting in a chaotic variation of semi-major axes as objects hop between resonances. The orbital poles of the objects circle that of the Solar System's Laplace plane, which at large semi-major axes is warped toward the plane of Planet Nine's orbit, causing their poles to be clustered toward one side.

== Apsidal anti-alignment ==
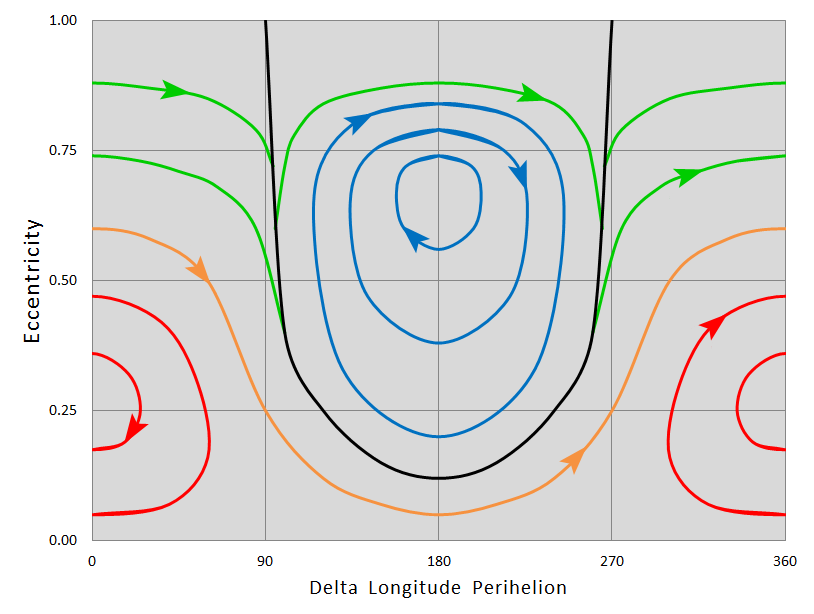
Secular evolution of eTNOs induced by Planet Nine for objects with semi-major axis of 250 AU. Blue:anti-aligned, Red:aligned, Green:metastable, Orange:circulating. Crossing orbits above black line. (Note: Similar figures in articles by Beust and Batygin and Morbidelli are plots of the Hamiltonian, showing combinations of orbital eccentricities and orientations that have equal energy. If there are no close encounters with Planet Nine, which would change the energy of the orbit, the object's orbital elements remain on one of these curves as the orbits evolve.)

The anti-alignment and the raising of the perihelia of extreme trans-Neptunian objects with semi-major axes greater than 250 AU is produced by the secular effects of Planet Nine. Secular effects act on timescales much longer than orbital periods so the perturbations two objects exert on each other are the average between all possible configurations. Effectively the interactions become like those between two wires of varying thickness, thicker where the objects spend more time, that are exerting torques on each other, causing exchanges of angular momentum but not energy. Thus secular effects can alter the eccentricities, inclinations and orientations of orbits but not the semi-major axes.

Exchanges of angular momentum with Planet Nine cause the perihelia of the anti-aligned objects to rise and fall while their longitudes of perihelion librate, or oscillate within a limited range of values. When the angle between an anti-aligned object's perihelion and Planet Nine's (delta longitude of perihelion on diagram) climbs beyond 180° Planet Nine exerts a positive average torque on the object's orbit. This torque increases the object's angular momentum (Note: Angular momentum in an elliptical orbit $L = \sqrt{G M m a (1-e^2)}$) from Planet Nine causing the eccentricity of its orbit to decline (see blue curves on diagram) and its perihelion to rise away from Neptune's orbit. The object's precession then slows and eventually reverses as its eccentricity declines. After delta longitude of perihelion drops below 180° the object begins to feel a negative average torque and loses angular momentum to Planet Nine causing its eccentricity grows and perihelion falls. When the object's eccentricity is once again large it precesses forward, returning the object to its original orbit after several hundred million years.

The behavior of the orbits of other objects varies with their initial orbits. Stable orbits exist for aligned objects with small eccentricities. Although objects in these orbits have high perihelia and have yet to be observed, they may have been captured at the same time as Planet Nine due to perturbations from a passing star. Aligned objects with lower perihelia are only temporarily stable, their orbits precess until parts of the orbits are tangent to that of Planet Nine, leading to frequent close encounters. After crossing this region the perihelia of their orbits decline, causing them to encounter the other planets, leading to their ejection. (Note: The observed aligned eTNOs are either objects recently scattered into large semi-major axis orbits or objects circulating while in mean motion resonance as discussed in the next section.)

The curves the orbits follow vary with semi-major axis of the object and if the object is in resonance. At smaller semi-major axes the aligned and anti-aligned regions shrink and eventually disappear below 150 AU, leaving typical Kuiper belt objects unaffected by Planet Nine. At larger semi-major axes the region with aligned orbits becomes narrower and the region with anti-aligned orbits becomes wider. These regions also shift to lower perihelia, with perihelia of 40 AU becoming stable for anti-aligned objects at semi-major axes greater than 1000 AU. The anti-alignment of resonant objects, for example if Sedna is in a 3:2 resonance with Planet Nine as proposed by Malhotra, Volk and Wang, is maintained by a similar evolution inside the mean-motion resonances. The objects behavior is more complex if Planet Nine and the eTNOs are in inclined orbits. Objects then undergo a chaotic evolution of their orbits, but spend much of their time in the aligned or anti-aligned orbits regions of relative stability associated with secular resonances.

== Evolution and long-term stability of anti-aligned orbits ==
An example of phase-protection in a mean-motion resonance: The orbital resonances of Orcus and Pluto in a rotating frame with a period equal to Neptune's orbital period. (Neptune is held stationary.)

The long term stability of anti-aligned extreme trans-Neptunian objects with orbits that intersect that of Planet Nine is due to their being captured in mean-motion resonances. Objects in mean-motion resonances with a massive planet are phase protected, preventing them from making close approaches to the planet. When the orbit of a resonant object drifts out of phase, (Note: Formally this is defined by the resonant angle: $\Phi_{\rm res} = \rm k\cdot\lambda - \rm l\cdot\lambda_{\rm P} - (\rm k-\rm l)\cdot\varpi$ where k and l are integers, λ and λ_{P}} are the mean longitudes of the object and the planet, and ϖ is the longitude of perihelion.) causing it to make closer approaches to a massive planet, the gravity of the planet modifies its orbit, altering its semi-major axis in the direction that reverses the drift. This process repeats as the drift continues in the other direction causing the orbit to appear to rock back and forth, or librate, about a stable center when viewed in a rotating frame of reference. In the example at right, when the orbit of a plutino drifts backward it loses angular momentum when it makes closer approaches ahead of Neptune, (Note: In a normal reference frame the plutino's orbit does not rock back and forth, instead when its period is greater than 3/2 that of Neptune it arrives later at perihelion when Neptune is closer.) causing its semi-major axis and period to shrink, reversing the drift.

In a simplified model where all objects orbit in the same plane and the giant planets are represented by rings, (Note: In this case a J2 quadrupolar gravitational moment is used to model the effects of the giant planets.) objects captured in strong resonances with Planet Nine could remain in them for the lifetime of the Solar System. At large semi-major axes, beyond a 3:1 resonance with Planet Nine, most of these objects would be in anti-aligned orbits. At smaller semi-major axes the longitudes of perihelia of an increasing number of objects could circulate, passing through all values ranging from 0° to 360°, without being ejected, (Note: The resonant angle for the circulating objects is $\phi_{\rm res} = \rm k\cdot\lambda_{\rm P9} - \rm l\cdot\lambda - \varpi - (\rm k-\rm l-1)\cdot\varpi_{\rm P9}$ i.e. $\phi_{\rm res} = \Phi_{\rm res} - \Delta\varpi$. As the resonant angle contains $\Delta\varpi$ the resonant angle can librate while the object's perihelion circulates.) reducing the fraction of objects that are anti-aligned. 2015 GT50 may be in one of these circulating orbits.

If this model is modified with Planet Nine and the eTNOs in inclined orbits the objects alternate between extended periods in stable resonances and periods of chaotic diffusion of their semi-major axes. The distance of the closest approaches varies with the inclinations and orientations of the orbits, in some cases weakening the phase protection and allowing close encounters. The close encounters can then alter the eTNO's orbit, producing stochastic jumps in its semi-major axis as it hops between resonances, including higher order resonances. This results in a chaotic diffusion of an object's semi-major axis until it is captured in a new stable resonance and the secular effects of Planet Nine shift its orbit to a more stable region. The chaotic diffusion reduces the range of longitudes of perihelion that anti-aligned objects can reach while remaining in stable orbits.

Neptune's gravity can also drive a chaotic diffusion of semi-major axes when all objects are in the same plane. Distant encounters with Neptune can alter the orbits of the eTNOs, causing their semi-major axes to vary significantly on million year timescales. These perturbations can cause the semi-major axes of the anti-aligned objects to diffuse chaotically while occasionally sticking in resonances with Planet Nine. At semi-major axes larger than Planet Nine's, where the objects spend more time, anti-alignment may be due to the secular effects outside mean-motion resonances.

The phase protection of Planet Nine's resonances stabilizes the orbits of objects that interact with Neptune via its resonances, for example 2013 FT28, or by close encounters for objects with low perihelia like 2007 TG422 and 2013 RF98. Instead of being ejected following a series of encounters these objects can hop between resonances with Planet Nine and evolve into orbits no longer interacting with Neptune. A shift in the position of Planet Nine in simulations from the location favored by an analysis of Cassini data to a position near aphelion has been shown to increase the stability of some of the observed objects, possibly due to this shifting the phases of their orbits to a stable range.

== Clustering of orbital poles (nodal alignment) ==
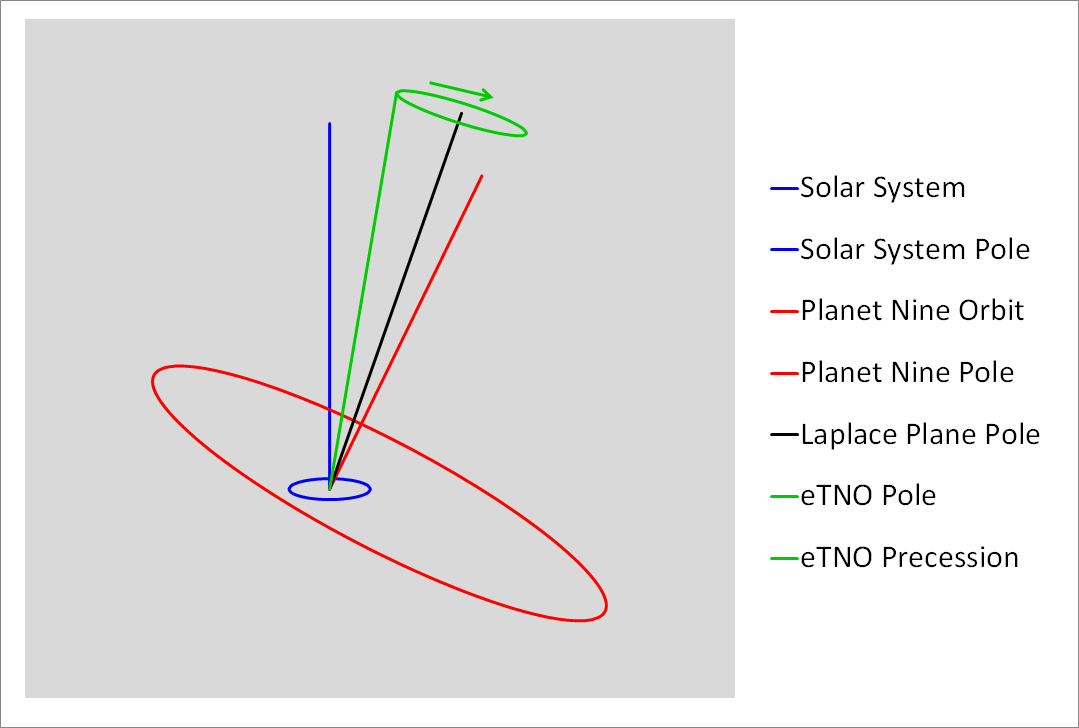
Tilting of Laplace Plane by Planet Nine

The clustering of the orbital poles, which produces an apparent clustering of the longitude of the ascending nodes and arguments of perihelion of the extreme TNOs, is the result of a warping of the Laplace plane of the Solar System toward that of Planet Nine's orbit. The Laplace plane defines the center around which the pole of an object's orbit precesses with time. At larger semi-major axes the angular momentum of Planet Nine causes the Laplace plane to be warped toward that of its orbit. (Note: At smaller semi-major axes the Laplace Plane is close to the invariable plane so the precession of the poles of typical Kuiper belt objects is unaffected by Planet Nine.) As a result, when the poles of the eTNO orbit precess around the Laplace plane's pole they tend to remain on one side of the ecliptic pole. For objects with small inclination relative to Planet Nine, which were found to be more stable in simulations, this off-center precession produces a libration of the longitudes of ascending nodes with respect to the ecliptic making them appear clustered. In simulations the precession is broken into short arcs by encounters with Planet Nine and the positions of the poles are clustered in an off-center elliptical region. In combination with the anti-alignment of the longitudes of perihelion this can also produce clustering of the arguments of perihelion. Node-crossings may also be avoided for enhanced stability.

== Objects in perpendicular orbits with large semi-major axis ==
The orbits of the five objects with high-inclination orbits (nearly perpendicular to the ecliptic) are shown here as cyan ellipses with the hypothetical Planet Nine in orange. Those of four are towards the left in this view, and that of one (2012 DR30) is towards the right, with an aphelion over 2,000 AU.

Planet Nine can deliver extreme trans-Neptunian objects into orbits roughly perpendicular to the plane of the Solar System. Several objects with high inclinations, greater than 50°, and large semi-major axes, above 250 AU, have been observed. Their high inclination orbits can be generated by a high order secular resonance with Planet Nine involving a linear combination of the orbit's arguments and longitudes of perihelion: Δϖ - 2ω. Low inclination eTNOs can enter this resonance after first reaching low eccentricity orbits. The resonance causes their eccentricities and inclinations to increase, delivering them into perpendicular orbits with low perihelia where they are more readily observed. The orbits then evolve into retrograde orbits with lower eccentricities after which they pass through a second phase of high eccentricity perpendicular orbits before returning to low eccentricity, low inclination orbits. Unlike the Kozai mechanism this resonance causes objects to reach their maximum eccentricities when in nearly perpendicular orbits. In simulations conducted by Batygin and Brown this evolution was relatively common, with 38% of stable objects undergoing it at least once. Saillenfest et al. also observed this behavior in their study of the secular dynamics of eTNOs and noted that it caused the perihelia to fall below 30 AU for objects with semi-major axes greater than 300 AU, and with Planet Nine in an inclined orbit it could occur for objects with semi-major axes as small as 150 AU. In simulations the arguments of perihelion of the objects with roughly perpendicular orbits and reaching low perihelia are clustered near or opposite Planet Nine's and their longitudes of ascending node are clustered around 90° in either direction from Planet Nine's. This is in rough agreement with observations with the differences attributed to distant encounters with the known giant planets. Nine high inclination objects with semi-major axes greater than 250 AU and perihelia beyond Jupiter's orbit are currently known:

High-inclination trans-Neptunian objects with a semi-major axis greater than 250 AU
Object	Orbit						Body	
Object	Perihelion (AU) Figure 9	Semimaj. (AU) Figure 9	Current distance from Sun (AU)	inc (°)	Eccen.	Arg. peri ω (°)	Mag.	Diam. (km)
2010 NV_{1}	9.4	323	14	141	0.97	133	22	20–45
2009 MS_{9}	11.1	348	12	68	0.97	129	21	30–60
2014 LM_{28}	16.8	268	17	85	0.94	38	22	46
2010 BK118	6.3	484	11	144	0.99	179	21	20–50
2013 BL76	8.5	1,213	11	99	0.99	166	21.6	15–40
2012 DR30	14	1,404	17	78	0.99	195	19.6	185
768325 Geyagugv	35.3	449	53	54	0.92	348	21.5	550
2015 RM_{306}	11.5	255	12	176	0.96	44	23	15–35
2020 YR_{3}	16.5	536	18	169	0.97	155	22	35–80

== Dynamically coherent bodies and disrupted binaries ==
The presence of one or more massive perturbers orbiting the Sun well beyond Pluto may lead to the appearance of dynamically coherent minor bodies, i.e. those with similar orbits within a population of otherwise uncorrelated objects, via binary dissociation. The fact is that dynamically correlated minor bodies seem to be ubiquitous among those in the outer Solar System. A well-known example is in the Haumea collisional family. Another, albeit less-studied case is that of Chiang's collisional family. At least one pair of extreme trans-Neptunian objects, the one made of 474640 Alicanto and 2013 RF98, exhibit both similar dynamics and physical properties. If there are no massive planets beyond Pluto, the orbits of the ETNOs must be randomized and the statistical distributions of some of their angular elements should be compatible with a uniform distribution. This has interesting implications on what it should and should not be observed when exploring the relationships between the orbits of the ETNOs. Favorable evidence is now mounting on the statistically significant deviations of the distribution of mutual nodal distances for this population. Such asymmetries are expected if massive perturbers (one or more) are present.

== Oort cloud and comets ==
Numerical simulations of the migration of the giant planets show that the number of objects captured in the Oort cloud is reduced if Planet Nine was in its predicted orbit at that time. This reduction of objects captured in the Oort cloud also occurred in simulations with the giant planets on their current orbits.

The inclination distribution of Jupiter-family (or ecliptic) comets would become broader under the influence of Planet Nine. Jupiter-family comets originate primarily from the scattering objects, trans-Neptunian objects with semi-major axes that vary over time due to distant encounters with Neptune. In a model including Planet Nine, the scattering objects that reach large semi-major axes dynamically interact with Planet Nine, increasing their inclinations. As a result, the population of the scattering objects, and the population of comets derived from it, is left with a broader inclination distribution. This inclination distribution is broader than is observed, in contrast to a five-planet Nice model without a Planet Nine that can closely match the observed inclination distribution.

In a model including Planet Nine, part of the population of Halley-type comets is derived from the cloud of objects that Planet Nine dynamically controls. This Planet Nine cloud is made up of objects with semi-major axes centered on that of Planet Nine that have had their perihelia raised by the gravitational influence of Planet Nine. The continued dynamical effects of Planet Nine drive oscillations of the perihelia of these objects, delivering some of them into planet-crossing orbits. Encounters with the other planets can then alter their orbits, placing them in low-perihelion orbits where they are observed as comets. The first step of this process is slow, requiring more than 100 million years, compared to comets from the Oort cloud, which can be dropped into low-perihelion orbits in one period. The Planet Nine cloud contributes roughly one-third of the total population of comets, which is similar to that without Planet Nine due to a reduced number of Oort cloud comets.
