= List of unnumbered trans-Neptunian objects: 2013 =

The following is a partial list of unnumbered trans-Neptunian objects for principal designations assigned within 2013. As of October 2026, it contains a total of 500 bodies. For more information see the description on the main page. Also see list for the previous and next year.

== 2013 ==
Designation	First Observed (discovered)		D (km)	Orbital description						Remarks	Refs
Designation	Date	Observer (Site)	D (km)	Class	a (AU)	e	i (°)	q (AU)	Q (AU)	Remarks	Refs
2013 AR_{183}	10 January 2013	Pan-STARRS 1 (F51)	230	res · 3:11	72.3	0.51	7	35.6	109.0	albedo: 0.126	MPC · JPL
2013 AZ60	10 January 2013	Mt. Lemmon Survey (G96)	62	centaur	428.1	0.98	17	7.9	848.3	albedo: 0.029; BRmag: 1.36	MPC · JPL
2013 BK_{78}	17 January 2013	Pan-STARRS 1 (F51)	17	centaur	38.4	0.79	2	8.3	68.5	albedo: 0.058	MPC · JPL
2013 BN_{27}	17 January 2013	Catalina Sky Survey (703)	2.4	damocloid	58.6	0.97	102	1.6	115.6	albedo: 0.048	MPC · JPL
2013 CG_{269}	4 February 2013	Cerro Tololo-DECam (W84)	133	cubewano (cold)?	43.8	0.07	2	40.6	46.9	albedo: 0.152	MPC · JPL
2013 EG_{191}	—	—	—	—	52.9	0.28	33	38.0	67.8	—	MPC · JPL
2013 EJ_{154}	6 March 2013	Pan-STARRS 1 (F51)	304	cubewano (hot)	44.1	0.12	10	39.0	49.2	albedo: 0.079	MPC · JPL
2013 EM_{149}	13 March 2013	M. W. Buie (695)	149	cubewano (cold)	45.2	0.06	3	42.6	47.8	binary: 90 km; albedo: 0.152	MPC · JPL
2013 EV_{134}	12 March 2013	M. W. Buie (695)	—	—	39.4	0.22	12	30.8	48.0	—	MPC · JPL
2013 FA_{28}	16 March 2013	S. S. Sheppard, C. A. Trujillo (807)	203	cubewano (cold)	44.1	0.04	2	42.4	45.9	albedo: 0.152	MPC · JPL
2013 FD_{28}	17 March 2013	Cerro Tololo Observatory, La Serena (807)	223	plutino	39.6	0.19	7	32.3	47.0	albedo: 0.074	MPC · JPL
2013 FG_{28}	17 March 2013	Cerro Tololo Observatory, La Serena (807)	140	SDO	54.4	0.34	21	36.0	72.8	albedo: 0.124	MPC · JPL
2013 FH_{28}	17 March 2013	Cerro Tololo Observatory, La Serena (807)	273	cubewano (hot)?	43.3	0.14	13	37.2	49.3	albedo: 0.079	MPC · JPL
2013 FK_{28}	16 March 2013	S. S. Sheppard (807)	126	cubewano (hot)?	43.0	0.12	12	38.1	48.0	albedo: 0.079	MPC · JPL
2013 FM_{28}	16 March 2013	S. S. Sheppard (807)	144	SDO	57.2	0.38	15	35.4	79.0	albedo: 0.124	MPC · JPL
2013 FQ28	17 March 2013	S. S. Sheppard, C. A. Trujillo (807)	226	SDO	62.4	0.27	26	45.7	79.2	albedo: 0.124	MPC · JPL
2013 FS28	5 May 2019	Cerro Tololo Observatory, La Serena (807)	395	SDO	136.8	0.74	13	35.9	237.6	albedo: 0.124	MPC · JPL
2013 FT28	16 March 2013	S. S. Sheppard (807)	137	EDDO	288.3	0.85	17	43.6	533.0	albedo: 0.124	MPC · JPL
2013 FU_{45}	—	—	—	—	51.3	0.27	12	37.4	65.2	—	MPC · JPL
2013 GA_{137}	4 April 2013	Outer Solar System Origins Survey (568)	86	cubewano (cold)	43.2	0.06	3	40.9	45.6	albedo: 0.152	MPC · JPL
2013 GB_{137}	4 April 2013	Outer Solar System Origins Survey (568)	86	cubewano (cold)	43.9	0.04	4	42.3	45.4	albedo: 0.152	MPC · JPL
2013 GB_{138}	9 April 2013	Outer Solar System Origins Survey (568)	118	cubewano (cold)	42.9	0.05	3	40.7	45.0	albedo: 0.152	MPC · JPL
2013 GC_{137}	4 April 2013	Outer Solar System Origins Survey (568)	86	cubewano (cold)	43.1	0.03	2	41.8	44.5	albedo: 0.152	MPC · JPL
2013 GC_{138}	9 April 2013	Outer Solar System Origins Survey (568)	117	cubewano (cold)	42.8	0.05	3	40.7	44.9	albedo: 0.152	MPC · JPL
2013 GD_{138}	9 April 2013	Outer Solar System Origins Survey (568)	111	cubewano (hot)	43.8	0.11	5	38.9	48.8	albedo: 0.079	MPC · JPL
2013 GE_{137}	4 April 2013	Outer Solar System Origins Survey (568)	81	plutino	39.3	0.26	4	29.2	49.4	albedo: 0.074	MPC · JPL
2013 GE_{138}	9 April 2013	Outer Solar System Origins Survey (568)	98	cubewano (cold)	44.1	0.06	3	41.6	46.5	albedo: 0.152	MPC · JPL
2013 GF_{137}	4 April 2013	Outer Solar System Origins Survey (568)	117	plutino	39.5	0.16	15	33.2	45.8	albedo: 0.074	MPC · JPL
2013 GF_{138}	9 April 2013	Outer Solar System Origins Survey (568)	118	cubewano (cold)	43.9	0.02	1	43.0	44.9	possible binary; albedo: 0.152	MPC · JPL
2013 GG_{137}	4 April 2013	Outer Solar System Origins Survey (568)	85	plutino	39.3	0.14	2	33.9	44.6	albedo: 0.074	MPC · JPL
2013 GG_{138}	9 April 2013	Outer Solar System Origins Survey (568)	222	cubewano (hot)?	47.4	0.03	25	46.1	48.7	albedo: 0.079	MPC · JPL
2013 GH_{137}	4 April 2013	Outer Solar System Origins Survey (568)	94	plutino	39.3	0.23	14	30.4	48.3	albedo: 0.074	MPC · JPL
2013 GJ_{137}	9 April 2013	Outer Solar System Origins Survey (568)	97	plutino	39.4	0.26	17	29.0	49.7	albedo: 0.074	MPC · JPL
2013 GJ_{138}	11 April 2013	Pan-STARRS 1 (F51)	129	centaur	123.0	0.79	28	26.1	219.9	albedo: 0.058	MPC · JPL
2013 GL_{137}	9 April 2013	Outer Solar System Origins Survey (568)	97	plutino	39.1	0.20	10	31.4	46.9	albedo: 0.074	MPC · JPL
2013 GM_{137}	4 April 2013	Outer Solar System Origins Survey (568)	164	cubewano (hot)?	44.0	0.08	23	40.6	47.5	albedo: 0.079	MPC · JPL
2013 GM_{158}	4 April 2013	Maunakea (568)	88	cubewano (cold)	43.5	0.02	3	42.8	44.1	albedo: 0.152	MPC · JPL
2013 GN_{158}	9 April 2013	Maunakea (568)	111	plutino	39.3	0.21	11	31.2	47.4	albedo: 0.074	MPC · JPL
2013 GO_{136}	9 April 2013	Outer Solar System Origins Survey (568)	84	other TNO	38.7	0.06	24	36.4	41.0	albedo: 0.13	MPC · JPL
2013 GO_{137}	4 April 2013	Outer Solar System Origins Survey (568)	154	cubewano (hot)?	41.3	0.09	29	37.7	45.0	albedo: 0.079	MPC · JPL
2013 GP_{137}	4 April 2013	Outer Solar System Origins Survey (568)	112	cubewano (cold)	43.6	0.02	2	42.6	44.7	albedo: 0.152	MPC · JPL
2013 GQ_{136}	9 April 2013	Outer Solar System Origins Survey (568)	165	cubewano (cold)	48.6	0.17	2	40.2	57.0	albedo: 0.152	MPC · JPL
2013 GR_{137}	9 April 2013	Outer Solar System Origins Survey (568)	78	cubewano (cold)	42.5	0.04	4	40.8	44.3	albedo: 0.152	MPC · JPL
2013 GS_{136}	4 April 2013	Outer Solar System Origins Survey (568)	75	res · 2:5	55.4	0.38	7	34.2	76.7	albedo: 0.126	MPC · JPL
2013 GS_{137}	9 April 2013	Outer Solar System Origins Survey (568)	94	cubewano (cold)	43.8	0.10	3	39.5	48.1	albedo: 0.152	MPC · JPL
2013 GU_{137}	9 April 2013	Outer Solar System Origins Survey (568)	103	cubewano (cold)	44.7	0.07	5	41.5	48.0	possible binary; albedo: 0.152	MPC · JPL
2013 GW_{141}	6 April 2013	Pan-STARRS 1 (F51)	131	centaur	566.3	0.96	32	23.5	1109.0	albedo: 0.058	MPC · JPL
2013 GX_{136}	9 April 2013	Outer Solar System Origins Survey (568)	82	twotino	47.9	0.25	1	35.9	59.8	albedo: 0.126	MPC · JPL
2013 GX_{137}	9 April 2013	Outer Solar System Origins Survey (568)	109	cubewano (cold)	43.2	0.06	4	40.8	45.6	possible binary; albedo: 0.152	MPC · JPL
2013 GY_{136}	9 April 2013	Outer Solar System Origins Survey (568)	104	res · 2:5	55.3	0.41	11	32.5	78.0	albedo: 0.126	MPC · JPL
2013 GY_{137}	9 April 2013	Outer Solar System Origins Survey (568)	143	cubewano (hot)	44.8	0.10	5	40.4	49.2	albedo: 0.079	MPC · JPL
2013 GZ_{137}	9 April 2013	Outer Solar System Origins Survey (568)	136	cubewano (hot)?	41.4	0.05	21	39.3	43.4	albedo: 0.079	MPC · JPL
2013 HG_{162}	16 April 2013	Pan-STARRS 1 (F51)	18	centaur	34.0	0.84	69	5.5	62.4	albedo: 0.058	MPC · JPL
2013 HR_{156}	19 April 2013	Outer Solar System Origins Survey (568)	120	cubewano (hot)?	45.6	0.19	20	37.0	54.2	albedo: 0.079	MPC · JPL
2013 HS_{150}	16 April 2013	DECam NEO Survey (W84)	2.6	damocloid	61.2	0.96	97	2.8	119.6	albedo: 0.048	MPC · JPL
2013 HS_{156}	19 April 2013	Outer Solar System Origins Survey (568)	94	cubewano (hot)?	45.5	0.17	8	37.6	53.5	albedo: 0.079	MPC · JPL
2013 HW_{156}	17 April 2013	Pan-STARRS 1 (F51)	154	plutino	39.5	0.25	10	29.9	49.2	albedo: 0.074	MPC · JPL
2013 JA_{65}	7 May 2013	Outer Solar System Origins Survey (568)	77	plutino	39.4	0.15	10	33.6	45.2	albedo: 0.074	MPC · JPL
2013 JB_{65}	7 May 2013	Outer Solar System Origins Survey (568)	102	plutino	39.3	0.19	25	31.9	46.6	albedo: 0.074	MPC · JPL
2013 JC_{65}	7 May 2013	Outer Solar System Origins Survey (568)	67	plutino	39.2	0.29	16	27.7	50.7	albedo: 0.074	MPC · JPL
2013 JC_{66}	11 May 2013	DECam (W84)	114	cubewano (hot)?	41.8	0.10	19	37.5	46.1	albedo: 0.079	MPC · JPL
2013 JD_{65}	7 May 2013	Outer Solar System Origins Survey (568)	112	plutino	39.2	0.09	13	35.7	42.8	albedo: 0.074	MPC · JPL
2013 JE_{65}	7 May 2013	Outer Solar System Origins Survey (568)	67	plutino	39.2	0.28	8	28.3	50.2	albedo: 0.074	MPC · JPL
2013 JE_{66}	11 May 2013	DECam (W84)	123	cubewano (hot)?	44.1	0.10	32	39.6	48.7	albedo: 0.079	MPC · JPL
2013 JF_{64}	7 May 2013	Outer Solar System Origins Survey (568)	52	res · 2:5	55.1	0.45	9	30.5	79.8	albedo: 0.126	MPC · JPL
2013 JF_{65}	7 May 2013	Outer Solar System Origins Survey (568)	71	plutino	39.2	0.17	8	32.4	46.1	albedo: 0.074	MPC · JPL
2013 JG_{65}	7 May 2013	Outer Solar System Origins Survey (568)	77	plutino	39.2	0.25	16	29.5	48.9	albedo: 0.074	MPC · JPL
2013 JH_{65}	8 May 2013	Outer Solar System Origins Survey (568)	64	plutino	39.1	0.28	8	28.0	50.1	albedo: 0.074	MPC · JPL
2013 JL_{64}	7 May 2013	Outer Solar System Origins Survey (568)	119	SDO	56.6	0.37	28	35.8	77.4	albedo: 0.124	MPC · JPL
2013 JM_{65}	7 May 2013	Outer Solar System Origins Survey (568)	171	cubewano (hot)	46.6	0.13	11	40.8	52.5	albedo: 0.079	MPC · JPL
2013 JO_{64}	7 May 2013	Outer Solar System Origins Survey (568)	86	SDO	141.6	0.75	9	35.1	248.1	albedo: 0.124	MPC · JPL
2013 JP_{64}	8 May 2013	Outer Solar System Origins Survey (568)	75	SDO	57.0	0.43	14	32.4	81.6	albedo: 0.124	MPC · JPL
2013 JQ_{64}	8 May 2013	Outer Solar System Origins Survey (568)	299	centaur	49.0	0.55	35	22.2	75.8	albedo: 0.058	MPC · JPL
2013 JQ_{65}	7 May 2013	Outer Solar System Origins Survey (568)	108	cubewano (hot)	44.1	0.12	8	38.7	49.5	albedo: 0.079	MPC · JPL
2013 JR_{64}	8 May 2013	Outer Solar System Origins Survey (568)	66	SDO	77.0	0.54	11	35.6	118.3	albedo: 0.124	MPC · JPL
2013 JR_{65}	8 May 2013	Outer Solar System Origins Survey (568)	124	cubewano (hot)?	46.0	0.19	12	37.5	54.5	albedo: 0.079	MPC · JPL
2013 JS_{64}	7 May 2013	Outer Solar System Origins Survey (568)	94	cubewano (hot)	42.4	0.05	10	40.5	44.3	albedo: 0.079	MPC · JPL
2013 JS_{65}	8 May 2013	Outer Solar System Origins Survey (568)	99	cubewano (hot)?	40.4	0.02	14	39.7	41.2	albedo: 0.079	MPC · JPL
2013 JT_{64}	7 May 2013	Maunakea (568)	82	cubewano (hot)?	42.4	0.19	10	34.5	50.3	albedo: 0.079	MPC · JPL
2013 JT_{65}	8 May 2013	Outer Solar System Origins Survey (568)	119	cubewano (hot)	46.5	0.20	9	37.2	55.7	albedo: 0.079	MPC · JPL
2013 JU_{63}	8 May 2013	Cerro Tololo Observatory, La Serena (807)	122	other TNO	48.4	0.26	4	36.0	60.9	albedo: 0.13	MPC · JPL
2013 JU_{64}	7 May 2013	Outer Solar System Origins Survey (568)	86	cubewano (hot)?	40.1	0.07	27	37.3	42.8	albedo: 0.079	MPC · JPL
2013 JV_{63}	8 May 2013	Cerro Tololo Observatory, La Serena (807)	237	cubewano (hot)?	46.3	0.22	8	36.3	56.3	albedo: 0.079	MPC · JPL
2013 JV_{64}	7 May 2013	Outer Solar System Origins Survey (568)	124	SDO	72.5	0.57	31	31.0	114.0	albedo: 0.124	MPC · JPL
2013 JW_{63}	8 May 2013	Cerro Tololo Observatory, La Serena (807)	473	cubewano (hot)	45.5	0.10	8	41.0	50.0	albedo: 0.079	MPC · JPL
2013 JW_{65}	11 May 2013	Pan-STARRS 1 (F51)	156	twotino	47.5	0.32	6	32.2	62.8	albedo: 0.126	MPC · JPL
2013 JX_{67}	8 May 2013	Maunakea (568)	216	cubewano (hot)	46.2	0.13	11	40.3	52.1	albedo: 0.079	MPC · JPL
2013 JY_{64}	8 May 2013	Maunakea (568)	94	cubewano (hot)?	43.1	0.06	8	40.7	45.6	albedo: 0.079	MPC · JPL
2013 JZ_{64}	7 May 2013	Outer Solar System Origins Survey (568)	74	plutino	39.3	0.23	10	30.2	48.3	albedo: 0.074	MPC · JPL
2013 LD_{16}	6 June 2013	Mt. Lemmon Survey (G96)	4	damocloid	78.2	0.97	155	2.5	153.8	albedo: 0.048; BRmag: 1.30	MPC · JPL
2013 LU_{35}	5 June 2013	New Horizons KBO Search (268)	50	cubewano (cold)	43.5	0.08	3	39.9	47.2	albedo: 0.152	MPC · JPL
2013 LY_{35}	12 June 2013	Pan-STARRS 1 (F51)	298	cubewano (hot)	42.5	0.05	9	40.2	44.7	albedo: 0.079	MPC · JPL
2013 LZ_{36}	9 June 2013	Pan-STARRS 1 (F51)	142	res · 2:5	55.0	0.34	14	36.4	73.7	albedo: 0.126	MPC · JPL
2013 MC_{12}	30 June 2013	Pan-STARRS 1 (F51)	—	—	44.4	0.18	2	36.4	52.4	—	MPC · JPL
2013 NE_{83}	14 July 2013	Cerro Tololo-DECam (W84)	86	other TNO	36.4	0.10	20	32.7	40.0	albedo: 0.13	MPC · JPL
2013 NF_{83}	14 July 2013	Cerro Tololo-DECam (W84)	92	other TNO	35.0	0.11	6	31.3	38.7	albedo: 0.13	MPC · JPL
2013 NG_{83}	14 July 2013	Cerro Tololo-DECam (W84)	98	other TNO	39.3	0.17	6	32.5	46.2	albedo: 0.13	MPC · JPL
2013 NH_{83}	14 July 2013	Cerro Tololo-DECam (W84)	209	other TNO	60.2	0.10	6	54.2	66.3	albedo: 0.13	MPC · JPL
2013 NM_{24}	14 July 2013	Pan-STARRS 1 (F51)	263	cubewano (hot)?	45.0	0.17	31	37.5	52.4	albedo: 0.079	MPC · JPL
2013 NU_{33}	14 July 2013	Pan-STARRS 1 (F51)	127	SDO	69.6	0.54	22	32.2	106.9	albedo: 0.124	MPC · JPL
2013 PD_{84}	9 August 2013	Pan-STARRS 1 (F51)	167	SDO	100.1	0.63	20	37.0	163.3	albedo: 0.124	MPC · JPL
2013 PS_{76}	9 August 2013	Outer Solar System Origins Survey (568)	108	cubewano (cold)?	43.7	0.14	3	37.5	49.9	albedo: 0.152	MPC · JPL
2013 PW_{74}	9 August 2013	Pan-STARRS 1 (F51)	128	other TNO	38.1	0.12	26	33.6	42.5	albedo: 0.13	MPC · JPL
2013 PX_{74}	9 August 2013	Pan-STARRS 1 (F51)	326	plutino	39.6	0.15	8	33.5	45.7	albedo: 0.074	MPC · JPL
2013 QP_{95}	30 August 2013	Dark Energy Survey (W84)	124	other TNO	40.9	0.17	25	33.8	48.0	albedo: 0.13; taxonomy: BB	MPC · JPL
2013 QQ_{95}	—	—	—	—	66.9	0.77	26	15.1	118.7	—	MPC · JPL
2013 QR_{99}	16 August 2013	DECam (W84)	164	cubewano (hot)?	41.0	0.04	32	39.3	42.6	albedo: 0.079	MPC · JPL
2013 QX_{103}	16 August 2013	DECam (W84)	98	SDO	50.2	0.26	33	37.2	63.3	albedo: 0.124	MPC · JPL
2013 RA_{156}	2 September 2013	DECam (W84)	141	centaur	31.1	0.08	13	28.5	33.6	albedo: 0.058	MPC · JPL
2013 RA_{157}	10 September 2013	DECam (W84)	76	SDO	55.1	0.40	38	33.2	77.0	albedo: 0.124	MPC · JPL
2013 RA_{158}	11 September 2013	DECam (W84)	131	cubewano (hot)?	45.9	0.17	19	38.3	53.5	albedo: 0.079	MPC · JPL
2013 RB_{109}	2 September 2013	Cerro Tololo-DECam (W84)	114	other TNO	40.3	0.11	23	35.8	44.8	albedo: 0.13	MPC · JPL
2013 RB_{156}	3 September 2013	DECam (W84)	107	other TNO	38.8	0.11	39	34.3	43.2	albedo: 0.13	MPC · JPL
2013 RB_{157}	10 September 2013	DECam (W84)	104	plutino	39.6	0.23	9	30.7	48.6	albedo: 0.074	MPC · JPL
2013 RB_{158}	11 September 2013	DECam (W84)	110	cubewano (hot)?	46.6	0.21	20	36.9	56.2	albedo: 0.079	MPC · JPL
2013 RB_{98}	1 September 2013	Dark Energy Survey (W84)	178	res · 3:5	42.5	0.26	22	31.4	53.5	albedo: 0.126	MPC · JPL
2013 RC_{109}	9 September 2013	Cerro Tololo-DECam (W84)	110	plutino	39.6	0.28	44	28.5	50.7	albedo: 0.074; taxonomy: IR	MPC · JPL
2013 RC_{156}	4 September 2013	DECam (W84)	117	SDO	170.7	0.78	35	37.4	304.0	albedo: 0.124	MPC · JPL
2013 RC_{157}	10 September 2013	DECam (W84)	81	plutino	39.5	0.26	13	29.4	49.5	albedo: 0.074	MPC · JPL
2013 RC_{158}	12 September 2013	Cerro Tololo-DECam (W84)	93	nep trj	30.2	0.06	7	28.5	31.9	albedo: 0.058	MPC · JPL
2013 RD_{109}	2 September 2013	Cerro Tololo-DECam (W84)	126	centaur	32.5	0.08	11	29.8	35.1	albedo: 0.058; taxonomy: BR	MPC · JPL
2013 RD_{124}	3 September 2013	DECam (W84)	206	cubewano (hot)?	42.8	0.09	15	38.8	46.8	albedo: 0.079	MPC · JPL
2013 RD_{156}	5 September 2013	DECam (W84)	205	cubewano (hot)?	46.8	0.08	29	43.3	50.3	albedo: 0.079	MPC · JPL
2013 RD_{157}	10 September 2013	DECam (W84)	108	res · 5:7	37.7	0.10	12	34.0	41.4	albedo: 0.126	MPC · JPL
2013 RD_{158}	12 September 2013	DECam (W84)	135	SDO	98.7	0.64	33	35.8	161.6	albedo: 0.124	MPC · JPL
2013 RD_{98}	12 September 2013	Dark Energy Survey (W84)	155	plutino	39.6	0.23	20	30.5	48.6	albedo: 0.074	MPC · JPL
2013 RE_{109}	2 September 2013	Cerro Tololo-DECam (W84)	205	res · 4:7	43.7	0.15	5	37.2	50.2	albedo: 0.126; taxonomy: RR	MPC · JPL
2013 RE_{124}	8 September 2013	DECam (W84)	150	SDO	121.0	0.67	32	40.1	202.0	albedo: 0.124	MPC · JPL
2013 RE_{156}	8 September 2013	DECam (W84)	169	cubewano (hot)?	40.5	0.04	13	38.9	42.1	albedo: 0.079	MPC · JPL
2013 RE_{157}	10 September 2013	DECam (W84)	165	cubewano (hot)?	46.1	0.13	36	39.9	52.2	albedo: 0.079	MPC · JPL
2013 RE_{158}	13 September 2013	DECam (W84)	142	centaur	47.9	0.40	28	29.0	66.8	albedo: 0.058	MPC · JPL
2013 RF_{109}	2 September 2013	Cerro Tololo-DECam (W84)	224	cubewano (hot)	43.0	0.07	10	40.1	45.8	albedo: 0.079; taxonomy: RR	MPC · JPL
2013 RF_{124}	11 September 2013	DECam (W84)	168	cubewano (cold)	43.5	0.04	4	41.9	45.0	albedo: 0.152	MPC · JPL
2013 RF_{156}	8 September 2013	DECam (W84)	172	plutino	39.4	0.26	7	29.2	49.5	albedo: 0.074	MPC · JPL
2013 RF_{157}	10 September 2013	DECam (W84)	80	res · 1:3	63.2	0.43	20	36.3	90.1	albedo: 0.126	MPC · JPL
2013 RF_{158}	13 September 2013	DECam (W84)	109	cubewano (hot)?	47.3	0.21	17	37.5	57.2	albedo: 0.079	MPC · JPL
2013 RF98	12 September 2013	Dark Energy Survey (W84)	66	ESDO	376.1	0.90	30	36.2	716.0	albedo: 0.124	MPC · JPL
2013 RG_{109}	2 September 2013	Cerro Tololo-DECam (W84)	139	other TNO	38.4	0.09	23	34.8	42.0	albedo: 0.13	MPC · JPL
2013 RG_{124}	13 September 2013	DECam (W84)	130	SDO	90.6	0.57	44	39.0	142.1	albedo: 0.124	MPC · JPL
2013 RG_{156}	8 September 2013	DECam (W84)	142	plutino	39.3	0.17	5	32.5	46.2	albedo: 0.074	MPC · JPL
2013 RG_{157}	10 September 2013	DECam (W84)	146	cubewano (hot)?	41.5	0.14	14	35.6	47.4	albedo: 0.079	MPC · JPL
2013 RG_{158}	13 September 2013	DECam (W84)	115	SDO	59.9	0.37	29	38.0	81.8	albedo: 0.124	MPC · JPL
2013 RH_{109}	8 September 2013	Cerro Tololo-DECam (W84)	113	res · 3:4	36.4	0.08	15	33.6	39.1	albedo: 0.126	MPC · JPL
2013 RH_{124}	10 September 2013	DECam (W84)	240	cubewano (hot)?	44.5	0.09	36	40.6	48.3	albedo: 0.079	MPC · JPL
2013 RH_{156}	8 September 2013	DECam (W84)	117	plutino	39.4	0.06	9	37.3	41.6	albedo: 0.074	MPC · JPL
2013 RH_{157}	10 September 2013	DECam (W84)	99	other TNO	38.7	0.04	5	37.3	40.1	albedo: 0.13	MPC · JPL
2013 RJ_{109}	8 September 2013	Cerro Tololo-DECam (W84)	186	cubewano (hot)?	43.4	0.13	20	37.5	49.2	albedo: 0.079; taxonomy: BR	MPC · JPL
2013 RJ_{124}	10 September 2013	DECam (W84)	181	cubewano (cold)	44.0	0.06	4	41.5	46.5	binary: 111 km; albedo: 0.152	MPC · JPL
2013 RJ_{158}	3 September 2013	DECam (W84)	149	SDO	89.5	0.63	17	33.2	145.8	albedo: 0.124	MPC · JPL
2013 RK_{109}	9 September 2013	Cerro Tololo-DECam (W84)	138	SDO	89.9	0.62	13	34.4	145.4	albedo: 0.124; taxonomy: IR	MPC · JPL
2013 RK_{124}	10 September 2013	DECam (W84)	149	plutino	39.6	0.18	7	32.4	46.9	albedo: 0.074	MPC · JPL
2013 RK_{158}	3 September 2013	DECam (W84)	172	cubewano (hot)?	44.5	0.12	34	39.0	49.9	albedo: 0.079	MPC · JPL
2013 RL_{109}	10 September 2013	Cerro Tololo-DECam (W84)	104	other TNO	40.1	0.20	14	32.1	48.1	albedo: 0.13	MPC · JPL
2013 RL_{124}	10 September 2013	Cerro Tololo-DECam (W84)	95	nep trj	30.2	0.03	10	29.4	31.1	albedo: 0.058	MPC · JPL
2013 RL_{157}	10 September 2013	DECam (W84)	110	SDO	55.3	0.30	21	38.9	71.8	albedo: 0.124	MPC · JPL
2013 RL_{158}	3 September 2013	DECam (W84)	153	cubewano (hot)?	40.3	0.06	15	38.0	42.6	albedo: 0.079	MPC · JPL
2013 RM_{109}	10 September 2013	Cerro Tololo-DECam (W84)	170	res · 5:11	50.8	0.22	14	39.5	62.1	albedo: 0.126; taxonomy: IR	MPC · JPL
2013 RM_{124}	11 September 2013	DECam (W84)	100	res · 1:5	88.3	0.60	14	35.3	141.3	albedo: 0.126	MPC · JPL
2013 RM_{157}	10 September 2013	DECam (W84)	173	SDO	56.8	0.35	14	37.0	76.5	albedo: 0.124	MPC · JPL
2013 RM_{158}	5 September 2013	DECam (W84)	195	cubewano (hot)?	43.6	0.10	18	39.2	48.0	albedo: 0.079	MPC · JPL
2013 RN_{109}	10 September 2013	Cerro Tololo-DECam (W84)	140	cubewano (hot)?	42.7	0.16	32	35.9	49.5	albedo: 0.079	MPC · JPL
2013 RN_{124}	11 September 2013	DECam (W84)	207	cubewano (hot)?	45.3	0.16	15	38.3	52.4	albedo: 0.079; taxonomy: BR	MPC · JPL
2013 RN_{158}	8 September 2013	DECam (W84)	83	other TNO	46.2	0.34	14	30.4	62.0	albedo: 0.13	MPC · JPL
2013 RO_{109}	11 September 2013	Cerro Tololo-DECam (W84)	141	cubewano (cold)	44.1	0.04	2	42.5	45.7	albedo: 0.152; taxonomy: RR	MPC · JPL
2013 RO_{124}	11 September 2013	DECam (W84)	120	other TNO	38.8	0.08	25	35.7	42.0	albedo: 0.13; taxonomy: BB	MPC · JPL
2013 RO_{156}	8 September 2013	DECam (W84)	99	cubewano (cold)	43.0	0.04	1	41.4	44.5	albedo: 0.152	MPC · JPL
2013 RO_{157}	10 September 2013	DECam (W84)	77	SDO	73.1	0.56	12	32.0	114.2	albedo: 0.124	MPC · JPL
2013 RO_{158}	11 September 2013	DECam (W84)	141	cubewano (hot)?	40.4	0.07	18	37.5	43.3	albedo: 0.079	MPC · JPL
2013 RP_{109}	11 September 2013	Cerro Tololo-DECam (W84)	152	cubewano (cold)	44.8	0.11	2	40.1	49.5	albedo: 0.152; taxonomy: RR	MPC · JPL
2013 RP_{124}	12 September 2013	DECam (W84)	185	cubewano (hot)?	45.8	0.19	32	36.9	54.7	albedo: 0.079	MPC · JPL
2013 RP_{156}	8 September 2013	DECam (W84)	123	other TNO	39.0	0.11	32	34.6	43.5	albedo: 0.13	MPC · JPL
2013 RP_{157}	10 September 2013	DECam (W84)	106	res · 3:5?	42.6	0.13	9	37.1	48.1	albedo: 0.126	MPC · JPL
2013 RP_{158}	2 September 2013	DECam (W84)	125	cubewano (cold)	44.3	0.06	0	41.8	46.8	albedo: 0.152	MPC · JPL
2013 RP_{98}	3 September 2013	DECam (W84)	176	cubewano (hot)?	42.9	0.13	13	37.2	48.6	albedo: 0.079; taxonomy: BB	MPC · JPL
2013 RQ_{109}	12 September 2013	Cerro Tololo-DECam (W84)	98	res · 3:4	36.6	0.16	15	30.9	42.3	albedo: 0.126; taxonomy: BB	MPC · JPL
2013 RQ_{124}	13 September 2013	DECam (W84)	184	cubewano (hot)?	46.7	0.17	22	38.9	54.5	albedo: 0.079	MPC · JPL
2013 RQ_{155}	1 September 2013	DECam (W84)	124	SDO	51.1	0.31	39	35.2	67.0	albedo: 0.124	MPC · JPL
2013 RQ_{156}	9 September 2013	DECam (W84)	194	plutino	39.5	0.12	12	34.7	44.4	albedo: 0.074	MPC · JPL
2013 RQ_{157}	11 September 2013	DECam (W84)	99	res · 3:4	36.3	0.07	16	33.6	39.0	albedo: 0.126	MPC · JPL
2013 RQ_{158}	10 September 2013	DECam (W84)	175	cubewano (hot)	45.5	0.08	8	42.0	49.0	albedo: 0.079	MPC · JPL
2013 RQ_{98}	1 September 2013	DECam (W84)	105	SDO	55.5	0.43	38	31.5	79.4	albedo: 0.124	MPC · JPL
2013 RR_{109}	11 September 2013	DECam (W84)	138	cubewano (cold)	47.9	0.06	4	45.2	50.7	albedo: 0.152	MPC · JPL
2013 RR_{124}	13 September 2013	DECam (W84)	151	cubewano (hot)?	41.7	0.06	45	39.0	44.4	albedo: 0.079	MPC · JPL
2013 RR_{155}	1 September 2013	DECam (W84)	158	SDO	61.8	0.39	34	37.9	85.7	albedo: 0.124	MPC · JPL
2013 RR_{156}	9 September 2013	DECam (W84)	211	SDO	62.8	0.21	30	49.4	76.2	albedo: 0.124	MPC · JPL
2013 RR_{157}	11 September 2013	DECam (W84)	113	other TNO	38.3	0.05	32	36.6	40.1	albedo: 0.13	MPC · JPL
2013 RR_{98}	13 September 2013	DECam (W84)	145	SDO	50.1	0.28	38	35.9	64.3	albedo: 0.124; taxonomy: RR	MPC · JPL
2013 RS_{109}	2 September 2013	DECam (W84)	134	cubewano (cold)	44.7	0.12	5	39.5	49.9	albedo: 0.152; taxonomy: BR	MPC · JPL
2013 RS_{124}	10 September 2013	DECam (W84)	88	other TNO	46.6	0.25	15	34.8	58.4	albedo: 0.13	MPC · JPL
2013 RS_{155}	1 September 2013	DECam (W84)	136	SDO	50.3	0.27	34	37.0	63.6	albedo: 0.124	MPC · JPL
2013 RS_{156}	9 September 2013	DECam (W84)	118	SDO	60.8	0.39	14	37.3	84.2	albedo: 0.124	MPC · JPL
2013 RS_{157}	11 September 2013	DECam (W84)	182	cubewano (hot)?	45.7	0.18	11	37.7	53.7	albedo: 0.079	MPC · JPL
2013 RT_{109}	10 September 2013	DECam (W84)	134	cubewano (hot)?	45.5	0.21	17	35.9	55.0	albedo: 0.079	MPC · JPL
2013 RT_{124}	10 September 2013	DECam (W84)	105	SDO	65.5	0.44	18	36.4	94.6	albedo: 0.124	MPC · JPL
2013 RT_{128}	10 September 2013	DECam (W84)	128	other TNO	40.4	0.11	24	36.1	44.6	albedo: 0.13	MPC · JPL
2013 RT_{155}	1 September 2013	DECam (W84)	198	SDO	103.2	0.65	26	35.7	170.7	albedo: 0.124	MPC · JPL
2013 RT_{156}	9 September 2013	DECam (W84)	204	SDO	55.0	0.34	23	36.3	73.8	albedo: 0.124	MPC · JPL
2013 RT_{157}	11 September 2013	DECam (W84)	161	cubewano (hot)	42.1	0.06	13	39.4	44.7	albedo: 0.079	MPC · JPL
2013 RT_{158}	11 September 2013	DECam (W84)	143	cubewano (cold)	44.3	0.08	1	40.9	47.8	albedo: 0.152	MPC · JPL
2013 RU_{124}	10 September 2013	DECam (W84)	157	other TNO	48.6	0.26	32	36.2	61.0	albedo: 0.13	MPC · JPL
2013 RU_{128}	11 September 2013	DECam (W84)	113	SDO	61.0	0.41	25	35.7	86.3	albedo: 0.124	MPC · JPL
2013 RU_{155}	2 September 2013	DECam (W84)	117	cubewano (cold)	44.0	0.08	2	40.4	47.7	albedo: 0.152	MPC · JPL
2013 RU_{156}	9 September 2013	DECam (W84)	92	SDO	56.9	0.38	12	35.4	78.4	albedo: 0.124	MPC · JPL
2013 RU_{157}	11 September 2013	DECam (W84)	220	cubewano (hot)?	43.4	0.19	33	35.4	51.4	albedo: 0.079	MPC · JPL
2013 RV_{124}	9 September 2013	DECam (W84)	317	cubewano (hot)?	44.6	0.11	43	39.9	49.3	albedo: 0.079	MPC · JPL
2013 RV_{128}	13 September 2013	DECam (W84)	118	SDO	56.7	0.33	8	37.9	75.6	albedo: 0.124	MPC · JPL
2013 RV_{155}	2 September 2013	DECam (W84)	172	cubewano (hot)?	41.1	0.06	28	38.5	43.7	albedo: 0.079	MPC · JPL
2013 RV_{156}	9 September 2013	DECam (W84)	104	res · 4:7	43.8	0.09	6	40.1	47.5	albedo: 0.126	MPC · JPL
2013 RV_{157}	11 September 2013	DECam (W84)	87	SDO	68.1	0.50	12	33.8	102.3	albedo: 0.124	MPC · JPL
2013 RW_{124}	2 September 2013	DECam (W84)	116	res · 3:4	36.7	0.07	5	34.2	39.1	albedo: 0.126; taxonomy: BR	MPC · JPL
2013 RW_{128}	10 September 2013	DECam (W84)	198	cubewano (hot)	45.5	0.13	6	39.4	51.6	albedo: 0.079	MPC · JPL
2013 RW_{156}	10 September 2013	DECam (W84)	145	cubewano (hot)?	40.7	0.09	16	37.1	44.2	albedo: 0.079	MPC · JPL
2013 RW_{157}	11 September 2013	DECam (W84)	95	other TNO	46.8	0.25	14	34.9	58.6	albedo: 0.13	MPC · JPL
2013 RX_{108}	2 September 2013	Cerro Tololo-DECam (W84)	176	cubewano (cold)	45.4	0.06	5	42.6	48.3	albedo: 0.152	MPC · JPL
2013 RX_{124}	3 September 2013	DECam (W84)	110	plutino	39.4	0.24	30	29.9	48.9	albedo: 0.074	MPC · JPL
2013 RX_{155}	2 September 2013	DECam (W84)	123	other TNO	46.8	0.26	28	34.7	59.0	albedo: 0.13	MPC · JPL
2013 RX_{156}	10 September 2013	DECam (W84)	113	cubewano (hot)?	44.9	0.19	31	36.3	53.4	albedo: 0.079	MPC · JPL
2013 RX_{157}	11 September 2013	DECam (W84)	141	cubewano (hot)	41.3	0.04	13	39.5	43.1	albedo: 0.079	MPC · JPL
2013 RY_{108}	10 September 2013	Cerro Tololo-DECam (W84)	139	centaur	45.9	0.47	11	24.5	67.3	albedo: 0.058	MPC · JPL
2013 RY_{155}	2 September 2013	DECam (W84)	137	res · 6:11	45.0	0.19	11	36.3	53.7	albedo: 0.126	MPC · JPL
2013 RY_{156}	10 September 2013	DECam (W84)	152	SDO	49.2	0.28	15	35.3	63.0	albedo: 0.124	MPC · JPL
2013 RY_{157}	11 September 2013	DECam (W84)	146	res · 4:7	43.7	0.11	2	38.9	48.5	albedo: 0.126	MPC · JPL
2013 RZ_{108}	10 September 2013	Cerro Tololo-DECam (W84)	90	res · 2:5	55.9	0.46	13	30.3	81.5	albedo: 0.126	MPC · JPL
2013 RZ_{155}	2 September 2013	DECam (W84)	146	other TNO	40.7	0.11	29	36.4	45.0	albedo: 0.13	MPC · JPL
2013 RZ_{156}	10 September 2013	DECam (W84)	129	cubewano (hot)?	41.2	0.06	26	38.8	43.5	albedo: 0.079	MPC · JPL
2013 SA_{101}	29 September 2013	Outer Solar System Origins Survey (568)	133	twotino	47.8	0.27	4	35.0	60.5	albedo: 0.126	MPC · JPL
2013 SA_{112}	28 September 2013	DECam (W84)	150	cubewano (hot)	43.3	0.08	12	39.8	46.9	albedo: 0.079	MPC · JPL
2013 SA_{113}	30 September 2013	DECam (W84)	124	cubewano (hot)?	40.4	0.04	21	38.7	42.1	albedo: 0.079	MPC · JPL
2013 SB_{101}	29 September 2013	Outer Solar System Origins Survey (568)	86	res · 4:7	43.8	0.12	2	38.6	49.0	albedo: 0.126	MPC · JPL
2013 SB_{112}	28 September 2013	DECam (W84)	79	other TNO	38.4	0.09	33	35.2	41.7	albedo: 0.13	MPC · JPL
2013 SB_{113}	30 September 2013	DECam (W84)	111	cubewano (cold)	45.7	0.10	3	41.4	50.1	albedo: 0.152	MPC · JPL
2013 SC_{101}	29 September 2013	Outer Solar System Origins Survey (568)	98	cubewano (cold)	42.7	0.04	2	41.2	44.3	albedo: 0.152	MPC · JPL
2013 SC_{112}	28 September 2013	DECam (W84)	174	cubewano (hot)	44.9	0.13	10	39.1	50.6	albedo: 0.079	MPC · JPL
2013 SD_{101}	29 September 2013	Outer Solar System Origins Survey (568)	118	cubewano (cold)	43.5	0.02	2	42.5	44.4	albedo: 0.152	MPC · JPL
2013 SD_{106}	30 September 2013	DECam (W84)	261	cubewano (hot)?	44.2	0.15	22	37.6	50.9	albedo: 0.079	MPC · JPL
2013 SD_{112}	28 September 2013	DECam (W84)	93	res · 4:5	34.9	0.07	5	32.5	37.3	albedo: 0.126	MPC · JPL
2013 SD_{113}	30 September 2013	DECam (W84)	141	cubewano (hot)?	46.0	0.14	20	39.6	52.4	albedo: 0.079	MPC · JPL
2013 SE_{101}	29 September 2013	Outer Solar System Origins Survey (568)	98	cubewano (cold)	44.3	0.08	1	40.8	47.8	albedo: 0.152	MPC · JPL
2013 SE_{106}	30 September 2013	DECam (W84)	120	cubewano (cold)	42.9	0.03	0	41.4	44.3	albedo: 0.152	MPC · JPL
2013 SE_{112}	29 September 2013	DECam (W84)	94	res · 3:5	42.4	0.13	7	36.9	47.8	albedo: 0.126	MPC · JPL
2013 SE_{113}	30 September 2013	DECam (W84)	74	res · 4:7	43.8	0.25	31	33.1	54.6	albedo: 0.126	MPC · JPL
2013 SE_{99}	29 September 2013	Dark Energy Survey (W84)	104	SDO	81.7	0.55	18	36.5	126.8	albedo: 0.124	MPC · JPL
2013 SF_{101}	29 September 2013	Outer Solar System Origins Survey (568)	94	cubewano (cold)	42.5	0.05	1	40.3	44.8	albedo: 0.152	MPC · JPL
2013 SF_{106}	24 September 2013	DECam (W84)	381	res · 1:4?	75.3	0.42	40	43.5	107.1	albedo: 0.126; taxonomy: IR	MPC · JPL
2013 SF_{112}	29 September 2013	DECam (W84)	112	cubewano (cold)	43.8	0.01	4	43.4	44.3	albedo: 0.152	MPC · JPL
2013 SF_{113}	30 September 2013	DECam (W84)	140	plutino	39.3	0.03	38	38.2	40.4	albedo: 0.074	MPC · JPL
2013 SG_{101}	29 September 2013	Outer Solar System Origins Survey (568)	82	cubewano (cold)	46.7	0.06	2	44.0	49.4	albedo: 0.152	MPC · JPL
2013 SG_{102}	30 September 2013	Cerro Tololo-DECam (W84)	184	cubewano (hot)	43.1	0.01	8	42.7	43.5	albedo: 0.079	MPC · JPL
2013 SG_{106}	28 September 2013	DECam (W84)	126	SDO	61.8	0.39	21	37.7	85.8	albedo: 0.124	MPC · JPL
2013 SG_{112}	29 September 2013	DECam (W84)	84	res · 4:7?	43.9	0.16	4	37.1	50.7	albedo: 0.126	MPC · JPL
2013 SG_{113}	29 September 2013	DECam (W84)	176	cubewano (hot)	46.6	0.18	8	38.4	54.9	albedo: 0.079	MPC · JPL
2013 SH_{102}	30 September 2013	Cerro Tololo-DECam (W84)	117	other TNO	38.0	0.05	19	36.1	39.9	albedo: 0.13	MPC · JPL
2013 SH_{106}	29 September 2013	DECam (W84)	99	twotino	48.0	0.22	16	37.6	58.5	albedo: 0.126	MPC · JPL
2013 SH_{112}	29 September 2013	DECam (W84)	114	cubewano (cold)	45.8	0.09	2	41.6	50.0	albedo: 0.152	MPC · JPL
2013 SH_{113}	28 September 2013	DECam (W84)	114	cubewano (cold)	45.5	0.08	1	41.8	49.2	albedo: 0.152	MPC · JPL
2013 SJ_{100}	29 September 2013	Outer Solar System Origins Survey (568)	103	cubewano (cold)	43.7	0.04	3	41.8	45.6	possible binary; albedo: 0.152	MPC · JPL
2013 SJ_{102}	28 September 2013	Cerro Tololo-DECam (W84)	116	res · 4:7	43.8	0.28	7	31.5	56.1	albedo: 0.126; taxonomy: RR	MPC · JPL
2013 SJ_{106}	29 September 2013	DECam (W84)	158	cubewano (cold)	44.5	0.03	3	43.1	46.0	albedo: 0.152; taxonomy: IR	MPC · JPL
2013 SJ_{112}	29 September 2013	DECam (W84)	124	cubewano (cold)	43.8	0.01	4	43.4	44.2	albedo: 0.152	MPC · JPL
2013 SK_{100}	29 September 2013	Outer Solar System Origins Survey (568)	114	SDO	62.2	0.27	26	45.5	78.9	albedo: 0.124	MPC · JPL
2013 SK_{102}	28 September 2013	Cerro Tololo-DECam (W84)	276	cubewano (hot)?	43.5	0.18	7	35.6	51.4	albedo: 0.079	MPC · JPL
2013 SK_{106}	30 September 2013	DECam (W84)	143	cubewano (cold)	44.7	0.03	1	43.6	45.9	albedo: 0.152; taxonomy: IR	MPC · JPL
2013 SK_{112}	29 September 2013	DECam (W84)	110	cubewano (cold)	44.2	0.08	2	40.9	47.5	albedo: 0.152	MPC · JPL
2013 SL_{100}	29 September 2013	Outer Solar System Origins Survey (568)	98	cubewano (cold)	43.9	0.06	3	41.2	46.7	possible binary; albedo: 0.152	MPC · JPL
2013 SL_{106}	29 September 2013	DECam (W84)	188	cubewano (hot)?	46.9	0.20	10	37.6	56.2	albedo: 0.079	MPC · JPL
2013 SL_{112}	29 September 2013	DECam (W84)	83	res · 4:5	35.0	0.09	2	31.8	38.1	albedo: 0.126	MPC · JPL
2013 SM_{100}	29 September 2013	Outer Solar System Origins Survey (568)	68	cubewano (cold)	45.5	0.13	2	39.6	51.4	albedo: 0.152	MPC · JPL
2013 SM_{102}	28 September 2013	Cerro Tololo-DECam (W84)	128	SDO	52.5	0.26	11	38.9	66.1	albedo: 0.124; taxonomy: IR	MPC · JPL
2013 SM_{106}	29 September 2013	DECam (W84)	146	cubewano (hot)?	45.5	0.17	17	37.6	53.4	albedo: 0.079	MPC · JPL
2013 SM_{112}	29 September 2013	DECam (W84)	136	cubewano (cold)	44.3	0.07	3	41.1	47.5	albedo: 0.152	MPC · JPL
2013 SN_{100}	29 September 2013	Outer Solar System Origins Survey (568)	113	cubewano (hot)	43.8	0.03	6	42.7	44.9	albedo: 0.079	MPC · JPL
2013 SN_{102}	29 September 2013	Cerro Tololo-DECam (W84)	124	SDO	68.0	0.44	5	38.1	98.0	albedo: 0.124	MPC · JPL
2013 SN_{106}	29 September 2013	DECam (W84)	190	cubewano (hot)	43.6	0.05	7	41.6	45.7	albedo: 0.079; taxonomy: IR	MPC · JPL
2013 SN_{112}	29 September 2013	DECam (W84)	180	cubewano (hot)	43.4	0.04	13	41.6	45.2	albedo: 0.079	MPC · JPL
2013 SO_{100}	29 September 2013	Outer Solar System Origins Survey (568)	103	cubewano (cold)	45.9	0.14	3	39.5	52.4	albedo: 0.152	MPC · JPL
2013 SO_{102}	29 September 2013	Cerro Tololo-DECam (W84)	142	plutino	39.6	0.22	10	30.7	48.5	albedo: 0.074; taxonomy: BR	MPC · JPL
2013 SO_{112}	30 September 2013	DECam (W84)	148	SDO	50.5	0.31	25	34.7	66.3	albedo: 0.124	MPC · JPL
2013 SP_{100}	29 September 2013	Outer Solar System Origins Survey (568)	82	res · 4:7?	43.9	0.14	8	37.9	49.9	albedo: 0.126	MPC · JPL
2013 SP_{102}	29 September 2013	Cerro Tololo-DECam (W84)	294	plutino	39.5	0.15	12	33.6	45.4	albedo: 0.074; taxonomy: BR	MPC · JPL
2013 SP_{112}	30 September 2013	DECam (W84)	103	res · 4:9?	51.7	0.22	39	40.5	62.9	albedo: 0.126	MPC · JPL
2013 SQ_{100}	29 September 2013	Outer Solar System Origins Survey (568)	94	twotino	47.9	0.25	13	35.9	60.0	albedo: 0.126	MPC · JPL
2013 SQ_{102}	29 September 2013	Cerro Tololo-DECam (W84)	212	SDO	91.3	0.62	30	35.1	147.5	albedo: 0.124	MPC · JPL
2013 SQ_{112}	30 September 2013	DECam (W84)	100	cubewano (hot)?	42.7	0.11	23	38.3	47.2	albedo: 0.079	MPC · JPL
2013 SR_{100}	29 September 2013	Outer Solar System Origins Survey (568)	180	cubewano (hot)?	45.7	0.18	24	37.5	53.9	albedo: 0.079	MPC · JPL
2013 SR_{102}	30 September 2013	Cerro Tololo-DECam (W84)	261	res · 3:7	52.8	0.39	30	32.5	73.0	albedo: 0.126	MPC · JPL
2013 SS_{100}	29 September 2013	Outer Solar System Origins Survey (568)	78	cubewano (cold)	44.0	0.08	3	40.3	47.8	albedo: 0.152	MPC · JPL
2013 SS_{102}	30 September 2013	Cerro Tololo-DECam (W84)	194	cubewano (hot)?	47.4	0.20	26	37.9	56.9	albedo: 0.079	MPC · JPL
2013 SS_{112}	30 September 2013	DECam (W84)	90	cubewano (hot)?	40.1	0.08	15	37.0	43.1	albedo: 0.079	MPC · JPL
2013 ST_{100}	29 September 2013	Outer Solar System Origins Survey (568)	104	cubewano (hot)?	41.1	0.07	15	38.3	43.8	albedo: 0.079	MPC · JPL
2013 ST_{102}	29 September 2013	Maunakea (568)	75	cubewano (cold)	44.0	0.08	3	40.6	47.5	albedo: 0.152	MPC · JPL
2013 ST_{112}	30 September 2013	DECam (W84)	124	cubewano (cold)	43.6	0.05	5	41.7	45.6	albedo: 0.152	MPC · JPL
2013 SU_{100}	29 September 2013	Outer Solar System Origins Survey (568)	108	res · 3:5	42.3	0.23	10	32.7	52.0	albedo: 0.126	MPC · JPL
2013 SU_{112}	30 September 2013	DECam (W84)	136	plutino	39.3	0.20	2	31.3	47.3	albedo: 0.074	MPC · JPL
2013 SV_{100}	29 September 2013	Outer Solar System Origins Survey (568)	98	cubewano (cold)	43.2	0.03	2	41.9	44.5	possible binary; albedo: 0.152	MPC · JPL
2013 SV_{112}	30 September 2013	DECam (W84)	129	cubewano (hot)?	44.0	0.16	32	37.1	50.9	albedo: 0.079	MPC · JPL
2013 SW_{100}	29 September 2013	Outer Solar System Origins Survey (568)	78	cubewano (cold)	42.8	0.01	1	42.3	43.3	albedo: 0.152	MPC · JPL
2013 SW_{112}	30 September 2013	DECam (W84)	115	cubewano (cold)	43.9	0.09	1	40.0	47.8	albedo: 0.152	MPC · JPL
2013 SX_{100}	29 September 2013	Outer Solar System Origins Survey (568)	94	cubewano (cold)	42.9	0.02	1	42.0	43.7	albedo: 0.152	MPC · JPL
2013 SX_{112}	30 September 2013	DECam (W84)	94	res · 3:7	53.1	0.27	2	38.8	67.4	albedo: 0.126	MPC · JPL
2013 SY_{100}	29 September 2013	Outer Solar System Origins Survey (568)	123	cubewano (hot)?	43.4	0.16	27	36.4	50.3	albedo: 0.079	MPC · JPL
2013 SY_{111}	24 September 2013	DECam (W84)	116	SDO	54.2	0.32	45	37.1	71.3	albedo: 0.124	MPC · JPL
2013 SY_{112}	30 September 2013	DECam (W84)	139	centaur	38.1	0.31	14	26.2	50.1	albedo: 0.058	MPC · JPL
2013 SY99	29 September 2013	Maunakea (568)	162	EDDO	811.1	0.94	4	49.9	1572.2	albedo: 0.124	MPC · JPL
2013 SZ_{100}	29 September 2013	Outer Solar System Origins Survey (568)	124	cubewano (hot)	43.7	0.07	9	40.7	46.7	albedo: 0.079	MPC · JPL
2013 SZ_{111}	28 September 2013	DECam (W84)	129	cubewano (hot)?	41.6	0.13	26	36.4	46.8	albedo: 0.079	MPC · JPL
2013 SZ_{112}	30 September 2013	DECam (W84)	113	cubewano (cold)	43.0	0.04	1	41.4	44.7	albedo: 0.152	MPC · JPL
2013 SZ_{99}	29 September 2013	Outer Solar System Origins Survey (568)	95	other TNO	38.4	0.01	20	37.9	38.9	albedo: 0.13	MPC · JPL
2013 TA_{172}	13 October 2013	Cerro Tololo-DECam (W84)	119	plutino	39.6	0.19	15	32.2	47.0	albedo: 0.074	MPC · JPL
2013 TA_{228}	4 October 2013	DECam (W84)	117	twotino	46.3	0.18	11	38.1	54.5	albedo: 0.126	MPC · JPL
2013 TA_{229}	13 October 2013	DECam (W84)	110	cubewano (hot)?	41.6	0.13	24	36.4	46.9	albedo: 0.079	MPC · JPL
2013 TB_{172}	13 October 2013	Cerro Tololo-DECam (W84)	123	cubewano (hot)?	43.2	0.20	12	34.7	51.7	albedo: 0.079	MPC · JPL
2013 TB_{187}	12 October 2013	DECam (W84)	158	centaur	77.9	0.79	51	16.4	139.5	albedo: 0.058	MPC · JPL
2013 TB_{188}	4 October 2013	DECam (W84)	114	plutino	39.7	0.17	15	33.2	46.3	albedo: 0.074	MPC · JPL
2013 TB_{228}	4 October 2013	DECam (W84)	65	res · 2:5	56.0	0.47	21	29.7	82.2	albedo: 0.126	MPC · JPL
2013 TB_{229}	13 October 2013	DECam (W84)	123	cubewano (cold)	43.6	0.02	4	42.8	44.4	albedo: 0.152	MPC · JPL
2013 TC_{172}	11 October 2013	Cerro Tololo-DECam (W84)	195	cubewano (hot)	43.7	0.05	8	41.6	45.8	albedo: 0.079	MPC · JPL
2013 TC_{187}	13 October 2013	DECam (W84)	138	res · 4:7	43.8	0.06	1	41.0	46.6	albedo: 0.126	MPC · JPL
2013 TC_{188}	3 October 2013	DECam (W84)	163	cubewano (hot)	44.5	0.12	11	39.0	49.9	albedo: 0.079; taxonomy: BR	MPC · JPL
2013 TC_{228}	4 October 2013	DECam (W84)	160	cubewano (hot)?	44.4	0.14	20	38.2	50.5	albedo: 0.079	MPC · JPL
2013 TC_{229}	13 October 2013	DECam (W84)	90	twotino	47.8	0.22	8	37.2	58.5	albedo: 0.126	MPC · JPL
2013 TD_{172}	13 October 2013	Cerro Tololo-DECam (W84)	195	cubewano (hot)?	42.7	0.16	11	35.6	49.7	albedo: 0.079; taxonomy: BR	MPC · JPL
2013 TD_{187}	13 October 2013	DECam (W84)	118	SDO	61.7	0.38	6	38.4	84.9	albedo: 0.124	MPC · JPL
2013 TD_{188}	13 October 2013	DECam (W84)	139	cubewano (cold)	43.9	0.08	5	40.3	47.4	albedo: 0.152	MPC · JPL
2013 TD_{228}	4 October 2013	DECam (W84)	84	twotino	47.9	0.32	15	32.5	63.2	albedo: 0.126	MPC · JPL
2013 TD_{229}	13 October 2013	DECam (W84)	126	cubewano (cold)?	43.8	0.09	4	40.0	47.6	albedo: 0.152	MPC · JPL
2013 TE_{172}	4 October 2013	Cerro Tololo-DECam (W84)	132	other TNO	48.5	0.26	30	35.7	61.3	albedo: 0.13; taxonomy: BR	MPC · JPL
2013 TE_{187}	13 October 2013	DECam (W84)	163	cubewano (cold)	44.6	0.08	3	40.9	48.3	albedo: 0.152	MPC · JPL
2013 TE_{188}	3 October 2013	DECam (W84)	110	plutino	39.7	0.24	9	30.4	49.1	albedo: 0.074	MPC · JPL
2013 TE_{228}	4 October 2013	DECam (W84)	210	plutino	39.4	0.17	10	32.6	46.1	albedo: 0.074	MPC · JPL
2013 TE_{229}	13 October 2013	DECam (W84)	74	plutino	39.5	0.20	4	31.4	47.6	albedo: 0.074	MPC · JPL
2013 TF_{172}	13 October 2013	Cerro Tololo-DECam (W84)	128	cubewano (cold)	43.8	0.03	3	42.6	45.1	albedo: 0.152; taxonomy: BR	MPC · JPL
2013 TF_{187}	13 October 2013	DECam (W84)	107	res · 4:7	43.7	0.18	2	36.0	51.4	albedo: 0.126	MPC · JPL
2013 TF_{188}	13 October 2013	DECam (W84)	153	cubewano (hot)?	45.8	0.19	11	37.2	54.5	albedo: 0.079	MPC · JPL
2013 TF_{228}	4 October 2013	DECam (W84)	108	other TNO	40.9	0.10	22	36.7	45.0	albedo: 0.13	MPC · JPL
2013 TF_{229}	13 October 2013	DECam (W84)	206	plutino	39.5	0.16	15	33.1	45.8	albedo: 0.074	MPC · JPL
2013 TG_{172}	3 October 2013	Cerro Tololo-DECam (W84)	85	twotino	48.1	0.32	5	32.6	63.5	albedo: 0.126	MPC · JPL
2013 TG_{187}	13 October 2013	DECam (W84)	109	twotino	47.5	0.25	6	35.6	59.5	albedo: 0.126	MPC · JPL
2013 TG_{228}	4 October 2013	DECam (W84)	96	twotino	47.9	0.17	19	39.8	56.0	albedo: 0.126	MPC · JPL
2013 TG_{229}	13 October 2013	DECam (W84)	134	cubewano (cold)	44.6	0.04	4	42.9	46.4	albedo: 0.152	MPC · JPL
2013 TH_{159}	3 October 2013	Dark Energy Survey (W84)	86	cubewano (hot)?	41.0	0.08	34	37.6	44.4	albedo: 0.079	MPC · JPL
2013 TH_{172}	3 October 2013	Cerro Tololo-DECam (W84)	104	res · 3:5	42.4	0.26	12	31.5	53.4	albedo: 0.126; taxonomy: RR	MPC · JPL
2013 TH_{187}	13 October 2013	DECam (W84)	117	cubewano (cold)	44.3	0.06	3	41.8	46.8	albedo: 0.152	MPC · JPL
2013 TH_{228}	4 October 2013	DECam (W84)	96	twotino	48.2	0.26	12	35.9	60.5	albedo: 0.126	MPC · JPL
2013 TH_{229}	13 October 2013	DECam (W84)	124	cubewano (cold)	42.9	0.04	4	41.2	44.6	albedo: 0.152	MPC · JPL
2013 TJ_{172}	3 October 2013	Cerro Tololo-DECam (W84)	159	SDO	52.3	0.29	27	36.9	67.7	albedo: 0.124	MPC · JPL
2013 TJ_{187}	13 October 2013	DECam (W84)	173	cubewano (hot)	42.8	0.10	11	38.6	47.0	albedo: 0.079	MPC · JPL
2013 TJ_{228}	11 October 2013	DECam (W84)	83	cubewano (cold)	45.3	0.13	2	39.4	51.3	albedo: 0.152	MPC · JPL
2013 TJ_{229}	13 October 2013	DECam (W84)	103	SDO	57.0	0.35	37	36.9	77.2	albedo: 0.124	MPC · JPL
2013 TK_{172}	4 October 2013	Cerro Tololo-DECam (W84)	187	cubewano (hot)?	46.6	0.20	13	37.1	56.0	albedo: 0.079	MPC · JPL
2013 TK_{187}	13 October 2013	DECam (W84)	151	res · 4:7	43.8	0.06	7	41.2	46.4	albedo: 0.126	MPC · JPL
2013 TK_{227}	2 October 2013	Cerro Tololo-DECam (W84)	73	nep trj	30.2	0.08	19	27.9	32.6	albedo: 0.058	MPC · JPL
2013 TK_{228}	12 October 2013	DECam (W84)	124	twotino	47.8	0.31	2	33.0	62.6	albedo: 0.126	MPC · JPL
2013 TL_{172}	13 October 2013	Cerro Tololo-DECam (W84)	143	cubewano (cold)	43.9	0.06	2	41.2	46.5	albedo: 0.152	MPC · JPL
2013 TL_{187}	13 October 2013	DECam (W84)	87	plutino	39.5	0.21	19	31.4	47.6	albedo: 0.074	MPC · JPL
2013 TL_{227}	2 October 2013	DECam (W84)	99	cubewano (hot)?	40.4	0.07	23	37.5	43.3	albedo: 0.079	MPC · JPL
2013 TL_{228}	12 October 2013	DECam (W84)	132	twotino	47.7	0.25	9	35.9	59.6	albedo: 0.126	MPC · JPL
2013 TM_{172}	13 October 2013	Cerro Tololo-DECam (W84)	103	res · 2:7?	70.0	0.48	13	36.5	103.6	albedo: 0.126	MPC · JPL
2013 TM_{187}	13 October 2013	DECam (W84)	75	res · 3:4	36.6	0.14	12	31.3	41.8	albedo: 0.126; taxonomy: RR	MPC · JPL
2013 TM_{227}	3 October 2013	DECam (W84)	99	plutino	39.5	0.20	7	31.6	47.3	albedo: 0.074	MPC · JPL
2013 TM_{228}	13 October 2013	DECam (W84)	97	cubewano (cold)	42.8	0.07	1	40.0	45.7	albedo: 0.152	MPC · JPL
2013 TM_{229}	13 October 2013	DECam (W84)	147	cubewano (cold)	43.5	0.06	4	40.8	46.1	albedo: 0.152	MPC · JPL
2013 TN_{187}	3 October 2013	DECam (W84)	109	res · 3:7	53.5	0.38	10	33.2	73.7	albedo: 0.126	MPC · JPL
2013 TN_{227}	3 October 2013	DECam (W84)	165	cubewano (hot)	43.5	0.02	5	42.9	44.2	albedo: 0.079	MPC · JPL
2013 TN_{228}	13 October 2013	DECam (W84)	103	res · 1:5?	89.5	0.63	19	33.2	145.8	albedo: 0.126	MPC · JPL
2013 TN_{229}	2 October 2013	DECam (W84)	143	cubewano (hot)?	45.5	0.23	18	35.2	55.8	albedo: 0.079	MPC · JPL
2013 TO_{187}	3 October 2013	DECam (W84)	116	plutino	39.5	0.19	9	31.8	47.2	albedo: 0.074	MPC · JPL
2013 TO_{228}	13 October 2013	DECam (W84)	122	cubewano (cold)	44.1	0.05	3	42.1	46.1	albedo: 0.152	MPC · JPL
2013 TO_{229}	3 October 2013	DECam (W84)	129	cubewano (cold)	43.9	0.04	1	42.2	45.6	albedo: 0.152	MPC · JPL
2013 TP_{187}	3 October 2013	DECam (W84)	142	SDO	80.3	0.52	31	38.3	122.3	albedo: 0.124	MPC · JPL
2013 TP_{227}	3 October 2013	DECam (W84)	136	cubewano (hot)	43.3	0.10	14	39.0	47.6	albedo: 0.079	MPC · JPL
2013 TP_{228}	13 October 2013	DECam (W84)	141	cubewano (cold)	45.2	0.05	3	43.1	47.3	albedo: 0.152	MPC · JPL
2013 TP_{229}	11 October 2013	DECam (W84)	128	cubewano (hot)?	42.8	0.15	23	36.5	49.0	albedo: 0.079	MPC · JPL
2013 TQ_{187}	3 October 2013	DECam (W84)	164	cubewano (hot)	43.7	0.10	10	39.5	48.0	albedo: 0.079; taxonomy: IR	MPC · JPL
2013 TQ_{227}	3 October 2013	DECam (W84)	149	cubewano (hot)	44.2	0.14	10	38.2	50.1	albedo: 0.079	MPC · JPL
2013 TQ_{228}	13 October 2013	DECam (W84)	108	res · 3:5	42.4	0.16	6	35.8	49.0	albedo: 0.126	MPC · JPL
2013 TQ_{229}	13 October 2013	DECam (W84)	120	plutino	39.5	0.16	6	33.2	45.8	albedo: 0.074	MPC · JPL
2013 TR_{187}	3 October 2013	DECam (W84)	117	SDO	61.5	0.40	14	36.8	86.2	albedo: 0.124	MPC · JPL
2013 TR_{227}	3 October 2013	DECam (W84)	127	plutino?	39.8	0.16	22	33.3	46.3	albedo: 0.074	MPC · JPL
2013 TS_{187}	13 October 2013	DECam (W84)	69	res · 4:5	35.0	0.10	5	31.5	38.4	albedo: 0.126	MPC · JPL
2013 TS_{227}	3 October 2013	DECam (W84)	135	centaur	33.8	0.33	24	22.7	44.8	albedo: 0.058	MPC · JPL
2013 TS_{228}	13 October 2013	DECam (W84)	98	cubewano (cold)	43.5	0.04	2	41.9	45.1	albedo: 0.152	MPC · JPL
2013 TS_{229}	4 October 2013	DECam (W84)	119	cubewano (cold)	44.3	0.08	1	41.0	47.6	albedo: 0.152	MPC · JPL
2013 TT_{187}	3 October 2013	DECam (W84)	165	cubewano (hot)?	44.2	0.12	19	39.1	49.4	albedo: 0.079	MPC · JPL
2013 TT_{227}	4 October 2013	DECam (W84)	117	cubewano (hot)	42.7	0.12	6	37.7	47.6	albedo: 0.079	MPC · JPL
2013 TT_{228}	13 October 2013	DECam (W84)	88	cubewano (cold)	44.0	0.07	1	40.9	47.1	albedo: 0.152	MPC · JPL
2013 TU_{187}	3 October 2013	DECam (W84)	135	plutino	39.5	0.16	15	33.0	45.9	albedo: 0.074; taxonomy: BB	MPC · JPL
2013 TU_{227}	4 October 2013	DECam (W84)	124	cubewano (hot)?	43.6	0.17	21	36.1	51.1	albedo: 0.079	MPC · JPL
2013 TU_{228}	13 October 2013	DECam (W84)	137	cubewano (cold)	45.6	0.07	3	42.4	48.7	albedo: 0.152	MPC · JPL
2013 TV_{187}	11 October 2013	DECam (W84)	177	plutino?	39.7	0.05	6	37.6	41.8	albedo: 0.074	MPC · JPL
2013 TV_{227}	4 October 2013	DECam (W84)	116	plutino	39.6	0.19	7	32.2	47.1	albedo: 0.074	MPC · JPL
2013 TV_{228}	13 October 2013	DECam (W84)	116	cubewano (cold)	42.6	0.03	3	41.1	44.0	albedo: 0.152	MPC · JPL
2013 TW_{187}	4 October 2013	DECam (W84)	115	cubewano (cold)	43.2	0.06	0	40.7	45.7	albedo: 0.152	MPC · JPL
2013 TW_{228}	13 October 2013	DECam (W84)	104	cubewano (cold)	43.6	0.05	3	41.2	45.9	albedo: 0.152	MPC · JPL
2013 TX_{171}	4 October 2013	Cerro Tololo-DECam (W84)	117	SDO	50.6	0.28	20	36.5	64.7	albedo: 0.124	MPC · JPL
2013 TX_{187}	12 October 2013	DECam (W84)	126	cubewano (cold)	43.0	0.05	1	40.9	45.0	albedo: 0.152	MPC · JPL
2013 TX_{227}	4 October 2013	DECam (W84)	95	res · 2:7	69.7	0.52	37	33.4	106.0	albedo: 0.126	MPC · JPL
2013 TX_{228}	13 October 2013	DECam (W84)	121	cubewano (cold)	43.4	0.03	3	42.2	44.6	albedo: 0.152	MPC · JPL
2013 TY_{171}	4 October 2013	Cerro Tololo-DECam (W84)	172	plutino	39.5	0.24	25	30.0	49.0	albedo: 0.074; taxonomy: RR	MPC · JPL
2013 TY_{187}	4 October 2013	DECam (W84)	223	cubewano (hot)	43.6	0.07	11	40.7	46.6	albedo: 0.079	MPC · JPL
2013 TY_{227}	4 October 2013	DECam (W84)	135	centaur	36.1	0.24	37	27.4	44.9	albedo: 0.058	MPC · JPL
2013 TY_{228}	13 October 2013	DECam (W84)	137	cubewano (cold)	45.1	0.14	5	38.9	51.4	albedo: 0.152	MPC · JPL
2013 TZ_{171}	4 October 2013	Cerro Tololo-DECam (W84)	159	cubewano (hot)?	45.7	0.20	16	36.7	54.6	albedo: 0.079; taxonomy: BR	MPC · JPL
2013 TZ_{187}	4 October 2013	Cerro Tololo-DECam (W84)	124	nep trj	30.3	0.07	13	28.2	32.4	albedo: 0.058	MPC · JPL
2013 TZ_{227}	4 October 2013	DECam (W84)	176	cubewano (hot)	43.4	0.06	9	40.8	46.1	albedo: 0.079	MPC · JPL
2013 TZ_{228}	13 October 2013	DECam (W84)	108	cubewano (cold)	44.0	0.04	4	42.2	45.8	albedo: 0.152	MPC · JPL
2013 UA_{17}	31 October 2013	Outer Solar System Origins Survey (568)	81	plutino	39.6	0.15	2	33.6	45.5	albedo: 0.074	MPC · JPL
2013 UA_{18}	31 October 2013	Outer Solar System Origins Survey (568)	124	cubewano (hot)	43.2	0.02	7	42.4	43.9	albedo: 0.079	MPC · JPL
2013 UB_{17}	31 October 2013	Outer Solar System Origins Survey (568)	149	res · 1:3?	62.7	0.29	33	44.7	80.6	albedo: 0.126	MPC · JPL
2013 UB_{18}	31 October 2013	Outer Solar System Origins Survey (568)	97	cubewano (cold)	45.3	0.04	4	43.6	47.0	albedo: 0.152	MPC · JPL
2013 UC_{18}	31 October 2013	Outer Solar System Origins Survey (568)	75	cubewano (cold)	42.9	0.04	3	41.3	44.6	albedo: 0.152	MPC · JPL
2013 UD_{17}	31 October 2013	Outer Solar System Origins Survey (568)	54	res · 2:5	55.8	0.40	26	33.6	78.0	albedo: 0.126	MPC · JPL
2013 UD_{18}	31 October 2013	Outer Solar System Origins Survey (568)	104	cubewano (cold)	45.1	0.10	3	40.5	49.8	albedo: 0.152	MPC · JPL
2013 UE_{17}	31 October 2013	Outer Solar System Origins Survey (568)	75	cubewano (cold)	43.2	0.05	1	41.3	45.1	albedo: 0.152	MPC · JPL
2013 UE_{18}	31 October 2013	Outer Solar System Origins Survey (568)	78	cubewano (cold)	45.5	0.09	2	41.3	49.7	albedo: 0.152	MPC · JPL
2013 UE_{31}	30 October 2013	DECam (W84)	236	cubewano (hot)?	47.1	0.20	39	37.7	56.6	albedo: 0.079; taxonomy: BB	MPC · JPL
2013 UF_{17}	31 October 2013	Outer Solar System Origins Survey (568)	81	plutino	39.6	0.25	17	29.6	49.6	albedo: 0.074	MPC · JPL
2013 UF_{18}	31 October 2013	Outer Solar System Origins Survey (568)	150	cubewano (hot)?	46.7	0.20	11	37.3	56.0	albedo: 0.079	MPC · JPL
2013 UF_{31}	27 October 2013	DECam (W84)	132	plutino	39.7	0.20	32	31.8	47.6	albedo: 0.074; taxonomy: BB	MPC · JPL
2013 UG_{17}	31 October 2013	Outer Solar System Origins Survey (568)	103	cubewano (hot)	43.9	0.08	8	40.4	47.3	albedo: 0.079	MPC · JPL
2013 UG_{18}	31 October 2013	Outer Solar System Origins Survey (568)	94	cubewano (cold)	44.9	0.11	1	40.1	49.6	albedo: 0.152	MPC · JPL
2013 UH15	29 October 2013	Las Campanas Observatory (304)	109	SDO	179.2	0.81	26	35.0	323.4	albedo: 0.124	MPC · JPL
2013 UH_{17}	31 October 2013	Outer Solar System Origins Survey (568)	59	twotino	48.0	0.31	9	33.3	62.7	albedo: 0.126	MPC · JPL
2013 UJ_{15}	28 October 2013	Las Campanas Observatory (304)	147	other TNO	52.3	0.29	33	37.4	67.3	albedo: 0.13	MPC · JPL
2013 UJ_{17}	31 October 2013	Outer Solar System Origins Survey (568)	75	plutino	39.7	0.19	7	32.2	47.2	albedo: 0.074	MPC · JPL
2013 UK_{15}	29 October 2013	Las Campanas Observatory (304)	236	twotino	48.1	0.20	12	38.6	57.6	albedo: 0.126	MPC · JPL
2013 UK_{17}	31 October 2013	Outer Solar System Origins Survey (568)	163	res · 4:7	43.8	0.29	25	31.3	56.3	albedo: 0.126	MPC · JPL
2013 UL_{17}	31 October 2013	Outer Solar System Origins Survey (568)	82	cubewano (cold)	42.8	0.03	2	41.8	43.9	albedo: 0.152	MPC · JPL
2013 UL_{49}	28 October 2013	DECam (W84)	205	cubewano (hot)	43.6	0.03	13	42.3	44.9	albedo: 0.079	MPC · JPL
2013 UM_{17}	31 October 2013	Outer Solar System Origins Survey (568)	127	cubewano (hot)	42.6	0.08	13	39.3	45.8	albedo: 0.079	MPC · JPL
2013 UN_{15}	31 October 2013	Maunakea (568)	118	cubewano (cold)	45.3	0.05	3	42.9	47.6	possible binary; albedo: 0.152	MPC · JPL
2013 UN_{17}	31 October 2013	Outer Solar System Origins Survey (568)	90	cubewano (cold)	43.7	0.03	3	42.5	44.8	albedo: 0.152	MPC · JPL
2013 UO_{15}	31 October 2013	Maunakea (568)	149	cubewano (cold)	43.4	0.05	4	41.5	45.4	possible binary; albedo: 0.152	MPC · JPL
2013 UO_{17}	31 October 2013	Outer Solar System Origins Survey (568)	83	res · 2:5	55.4	0.39	4	33.6	77.2	albedo: 0.126	MPC · JPL
2013 UP_{15}	31 October 2013	Maunakea (568)	106	cubewano (cold)	46.8	0.08	3	42.9	50.7	possible binary; albedo: 0.152	MPC · JPL
2013 UP_{17}	31 October 2013	Outer Solar System Origins Survey (568)	98	cubewano (cold)	44.0	0.05	1	41.8	46.2	albedo: 0.152	MPC · JPL
2013 UP_{44}	31 October 2013	Maunakea (568)	64	cubewano (cold)	46.1	0.14	3	39.9	52.4	albedo: 0.152	MPC · JPL
2013 UQ_{15}	31 October 2013	Outer Solar System Origins Survey (568)	261	cubewano (hot)?	42.9	0.11	27	38.1	47.6	albedo: 0.079	MPC · JPL
2013 UQ_{17}	31 October 2013	Outer Solar System Origins Survey (568)	64	res · 3:4	36.7	0.09	11	33.4	39.9	albedo: 0.126	MPC · JPL
2013 UR_{15}	31 October 2013	Outer Solar System Origins Survey (568)	33	centaur	56.4	0.72	22	15.7	97.1	albedo: 0.058	MPC · JPL
2013 UR_{17}	31 October 2013	Outer Solar System Origins Survey (568)	103	cubewano (cold)	44.5	0.07	3	41.2	47.8	possible binary; albedo: 0.152	MPC · JPL
2013 UR_{22}	31 October 2013	Maunakea (568)	91	cubewano (cold)	44.1	0.08	1	40.6	47.6	albedo: 0.152	MPC · JPL
2013 US_{15}	31 October 2013	Outer Solar System Origins Survey (568)	98	res · 3:4	36.5	0.07	2	33.8	39.2	albedo: 0.126	MPC · JPL
2013 US_{17}	31 October 2013	Outer Solar System Origins Survey (568)	83	cubewano (cold)	42.7	0.03	3	41.3	44.0	albedo: 0.152	MPC · JPL
2013 UT_{17}	31 October 2013	Outer Solar System Origins Survey (568)	98	cubewano (cold)	43.1	0.02	4	42.2	44.1	albedo: 0.152	MPC · JPL
2013 UT_{22}	29 October 2013	DECam (W84)	137	res · 3:5	42.5	0.21	29	33.5	51.5	albedo: 0.126; taxonomy: IR	MPC · JPL
2013 UV_{17}	31 October 2013	Outer Solar System Origins Survey (568)	107	plutino	39.5	0.18	2	32.5	46.5	albedo: 0.074	MPC · JPL
2013 UW_{16}	31 October 2013	Outer Solar System Origins Survey (568)	118	cubewano (cold)	44.5	0.08	2	41.1	47.9	binary: 76 km; albedo: 0.152	MPC · JPL
2013 UW_{17}	31 October 2013	Outer Solar System Origins Survey (568)	103	cubewano (cold)	45.5	0.01	2	44.8	46.1	albedo: 0.152	MPC · JPL
2013 UW_{18}	31 October 2013	Outer Solar System Origins Survey (568)	97	plutino	39.5	0.21	7	31.4	47.7	albedo: 0.074	MPC · JPL
2013 UX_{16}	31 October 2013	Outer Solar System Origins Survey (568)	123	plutino	39.3	0.24	4	30.0	48.5	albedo: 0.074	MPC · JPL
2013 UX_{17}	31 October 2013	Outer Solar System Origins Survey (568)	135	plutino	39.6	0.14	3	34.3	44.9	albedo: 0.074	MPC · JPL
2013 UX_{18}	31 October 2013	Outer Solar System Origins Survey (568)	130	cubewano (cold)	43.7	0.05	3	41.4	46.1	albedo: 0.152	MPC · JPL
2013 UY_{16}	31 October 2013	Outer Solar System Origins Survey (568)	103	cubewano (cold)	44.1	0.09	2	40.0	48.2	possible binary; albedo: 0.152	MPC · JPL
2013 UY_{17}	31 October 2013	Outer Solar System Origins Survey (568)	113	cubewano (cold)	44.4	0.05	5	42.2	46.6	albedo: 0.152	MPC · JPL
2013 UZ_{16}	31 October 2013	Outer Solar System Origins Survey (568)	102	other TNO	44.8	0.28	11	32.2	57.4	albedo: 0.13	MPC · JPL
2013 UZ_{17}	31 October 2013	Outer Solar System Origins Survey (568)	98	twotino	47.7	0.18	7	39.2	56.2	albedo: 0.126	MPC · JPL
2013 VA_{72}	4 November 2013	DECam (W84)	122	cubewano (hot)?	41.8	0.11	15	37.0	46.5	albedo: 0.079	MPC · JPL
2013 VB_{72}	4 November 2013	DECam (W84)	126	SDO	65.4	0.45	18	35.9	94.9	albedo: 0.124	MPC · JPL
2013 VC_{72}	4 November 2013	DECam (W84)	85	plutino	39.7	0.26	13	29.5	50.0	albedo: 0.074	MPC · JPL
2013 VD_{24}	6 November 2013	Dark Energy Survey (W84)	102	other TNO	53.2	0.18	19	43.6	62.9	albedo: 0.13	MPC · JPL
2013 VD_{72}	3 November 2013	DECam (W84)	80	twotino	48.2	0.29	22	34.4	61.9	albedo: 0.126	MPC · JPL
2013 VE_{72}	3 November 2013	DECam (W84)	99	res · 4:7?	43.7	0.28	14	31.3	56.1	albedo: 0.126	MPC · JPL
2013 VF_{24}	6 November 2013	Pan-STARRS 1 (F51)	110	plutino	39.8	0.33	20	26.6	53.0	albedo: 0.074	MPC · JPL
2013 VF_{72}	4 November 2013	DECam (W84)	173	plutino	39.5	0.09	27	35.8	43.2	albedo: 0.074	MPC · JPL
2013 VH_{72}	4 November 2013	DECam (W84)	128	cubewano (hot)	45.6	0.15	10	38.9	52.4	albedo: 0.079	MPC · JPL
2013 VK_{46}	8 November 2013	DECam (W84)	107	centaur	41.7	0.30	14	29.1	54.4	albedo: 0.058	MPC · JPL
2013 VL_{46}	8 November 2013	DECam (W84)	223	cubewano (hot)	45.7	0.10	7	41.1	50.3	albedo: 0.079	MPC · JPL
2013 VM_{46}	8 November 2013	DECam (W84)	72	res · 2:5	55.9	0.43	9	31.6	80.2	albedo: 0.126; taxonomy: IR	MPC · JPL
2013 VN_{46}	8 November 2013	DECam (W84)	94	plutino	39.6	0.24	8	30.0	49.2	albedo: 0.074	MPC · JPL
2013 VO_{46}	8 November 2013	DECam (W84)	100	twotino	48.2	0.30	12	33.9	62.6	albedo: 0.126	MPC · JPL
2013 VO_{71}	8 November 2013	DECam (W84)	225	cubewano (hot)?	44.1	0.15	16	37.5	50.7	albedo: 0.079	MPC · JPL
2013 VP_{46}	8 November 2013	DECam (W84)	101	twotino	48.0	0.27	13	35.1	60.9	albedo: 0.126	MPC · JPL
2013 VQ_{25}	3 November 2013	DECam (W84)	103	SDO	62.0	0.43	29	35.6	88.4	albedo: 0.124	MPC · JPL
2013 VQ_{46}	8 November 2013	DECam (W84)	153	plutino	39.4	0.24	10	30.1	48.7	albedo: 0.074	MPC · JPL
2013 VQ_{71}	8 November 2013	DECam (W84)	157	plutino	39.6	0.07	9	36.9	42.3	albedo: 0.074	MPC · JPL
2013 VR_{46}	13 November 2013	DECam (W84)	166	plutino	39.6	0.15	14	33.7	45.5	albedo: 0.074	MPC · JPL
2013 VR_{71}	8 November 2013	DECam (W84)	80	plutino	39.6	0.21	16	31.4	47.7	albedo: 0.074	MPC · JPL
2013 VS_{46}	13 November 2013	DECam (W84)	168	SDO	100.6	0.63	20	37.1	164.1	albedo: 0.124	MPC · JPL
2013 VS_{71}	8 November 2013	DECam (W84)	79	plutino	39.8	0.22	14	31.2	48.5	albedo: 0.074	MPC · JPL
2013 VT_{71}	8 November 2013	DECam (W84)	95	plutino	39.7	0.29	11	28.2	51.2	albedo: 0.074	MPC · JPL
2013 VU_{71}	8 November 2013	DECam (W84)	83	SDO	102.6	0.67	14	34.2	170.9	albedo: 0.124	MPC · JPL
2013 VV_{71}	13 November 2013	DECam (W84)	148	cubewano (hot)?	40.7	0.06	17	38.2	43.2	albedo: 0.079	MPC · JPL
2013 VW_{71}	8 November 2013	DECam (W84)	130	cubewano (cold)	44.2	0.01	2	43.6	44.8	albedo: 0.152	MPC · JPL
2013 VX_{30}	8 November 2013	Cerro Tololo-DECam (W84)	120	nep trj	30.3	0.09	31	27.6	33.0	albedo: 0.058; taxonomy: RR	MPC · JPL
2013 VX_{71}	8 November 2013	DECam (W84)	115	cubewano (cold)	44.1	0.08	3	40.4	47.8	albedo: 0.152	MPC · JPL
2013 VY_{71}	5 November 2013	DECam (W84)	108	plutino	39.6	0.16	11	33.3	45.8	albedo: 0.074	MPC · JPL
2013 VZ_{31}	8 November 2013	Cerro Tololo-DECam (W84)	162	cubewano (cold)	43.6	0.12	3	38.5	48.6	albedo: 0.152	MPC · JPL
2013 VZ_{71}	4 November 2013	DECam (W84)	91	SDO	52.7	0.29	28	37.7	67.8	albedo: 0.124	MPC · JPL
2013 WA_{139}	22 November 2013	DECam (W84)	145	cubewano (cold)	43.6	0.14	2	37.3	49.8	albedo: 0.152	MPC · JPL
2013 WB_{139}	22 November 2013	DECam (W84)	100	cubewano (cold)	43.0	0.03	3	41.9	44.1	albedo: 0.152	MPC · JPL
2013 WC_{139}	22 November 2013	DECam (W84)	100	cubewano (cold)	45.1	0.10	4	40.6	49.6	albedo: 0.152	MPC · JPL
2013 WG_{114}	22 November 2013	Cerro Tololo-DECam (W84)	159	cubewano (cold)	44.2	0.06	2	41.4	47.1	albedo: 0.152; taxonomy: RR	MPC · JPL
2013 WH_{123}	23 November 2013	DECam (W84)	177	cubewano (hot)	46.3	0.12	9	40.8	51.9	albedo: 0.079	MPC · JPL
2013 WJ_{123}	23 November 2013	DECam (W84)	137	plutino	39.7	0.23	9	30.6	48.8	albedo: 0.074	MPC · JPL
2013 WK_{123}	23 November 2013	DECam (W84)	103	res · 2:5	55.7	0.45	15	30.7	80.8	albedo: 0.126	MPC · JPL
2013 WR_{150}	23 November 2013	Cerro Tololo-DECam (W84)	—	—	117.8	0.69	19	36.8	198.8	—	MPC · JPL
2013 XL_{40}	1 December 2013	DECam (W84)	114	SDO	90.8	0.60	15	35.9	145.6	albedo: 0.124	MPC · JPL
2013 XM_{40}	2 December 2013	DECam (W84)	119	cubewano (hot)?	41.9	0.11	47	37.5	46.3	albedo: 0.079	MPC · JPL
2013 XU_{33}	1 December 2013	DECam (W84)	119	other TNO	40.8	0.10	23	36.6	44.9	albedo: 0.13	MPC · JPL
2013 YD_{169}	20 December 2013	DECam (W84)	124	cubewano (hot)?	42.9	0.17	29	35.4	50.3	albedo: 0.079	MPC · JPL

back to top
