= 474640 Alicanto =

Detached extreme trans-Neptunian object

- Orbit diagram of Alicanto

Discovery
- Discovered by: A. C. Becker
- Discovery site: Cerro Tololo
- Discovery date: 6 November 2004

Designations
- Pronunciation: /ˌæliˈkæntoʊ/ or /ˌɑːliˈkɑːntoʊ/ (PASTA vowel)
- Named after: Alicanto (Chilean mythology)
- Alternative designations: 2004 VN_{112}
- Minor planet category: TNO · detached-ETNO 36:1?

Orbital characteristics
- Epoch 17 December 2020 (JD 2459200.5)
- Uncertainty parameter 3 · 0
- Observation arc: 15.94 yr (5,821 d)
- Aphelion: 608 AU (barycentric); 618.32 AU
- Perihelion: 47.289 AU
- Semi-major axis: 328 AU (barycentric); 332.80 AU
- Eccentricity: 0.8579
- Orbital period (sidereal): 5900 yr (barycentric); 6071 yr (2,217,590 d)
- Mean anomaly: 0.6822°
- Mean motion: 0° 0^{m} 0.72^{s} / day
- Inclination: 25.572°
- Longitude of ascending node: 65.996°
- Argument of perihelion: 326.72°
- Known satellites: 0

Physical characteristics
- Mean diameter: 193 km (est.); 300 km (est.); 278.97 km (est.); 140 to 300 km (calculated)
- Geometric albedo: 0.124 (assumed.); 0.04 (assumed.); 0.057 (assumed.)
- Spectral type: 11.50±4.25%/$10^3$Å; 12±2%/0.1 μm (mean); B–V = 0.900±0.085; V–R = 0.520±0.060; V–I = 0.970±0.085; R-I = 0.970±0.085; B-I = 1.87±0.06; B-R = 1.42±0.06; V-J = ?; J-H = ?; H-K = ?; Blue; Double-dip/CO_{2} type
- Apparent magnitude: 23.3
- Absolute magnitude (H): 6.46

474640 Alicanto (provisional designation 2004 VN_{112}) is a detached extreme trans-Neptunian object. It was discovered on 6 November 2004, by American astronomer Andrew C. Becker at Cerro Tololo Inter-American Observatory in Chile. It never gets closer than 47 AU from the Sun (near the outer edge of the main Kuiper belt) and averages more than 300 AU from the Sun. Its large eccentricity strongly suggests that it was gravitationally scattered onto its current orbit. Because it is, like all detached objects, outside the current gravitational influence of Neptune, how it came to have this orbit cannot yet be explained. It was named after Alicanto, a nocturnal bird in Chilean mythology.

== History ==
=== Discovery ===
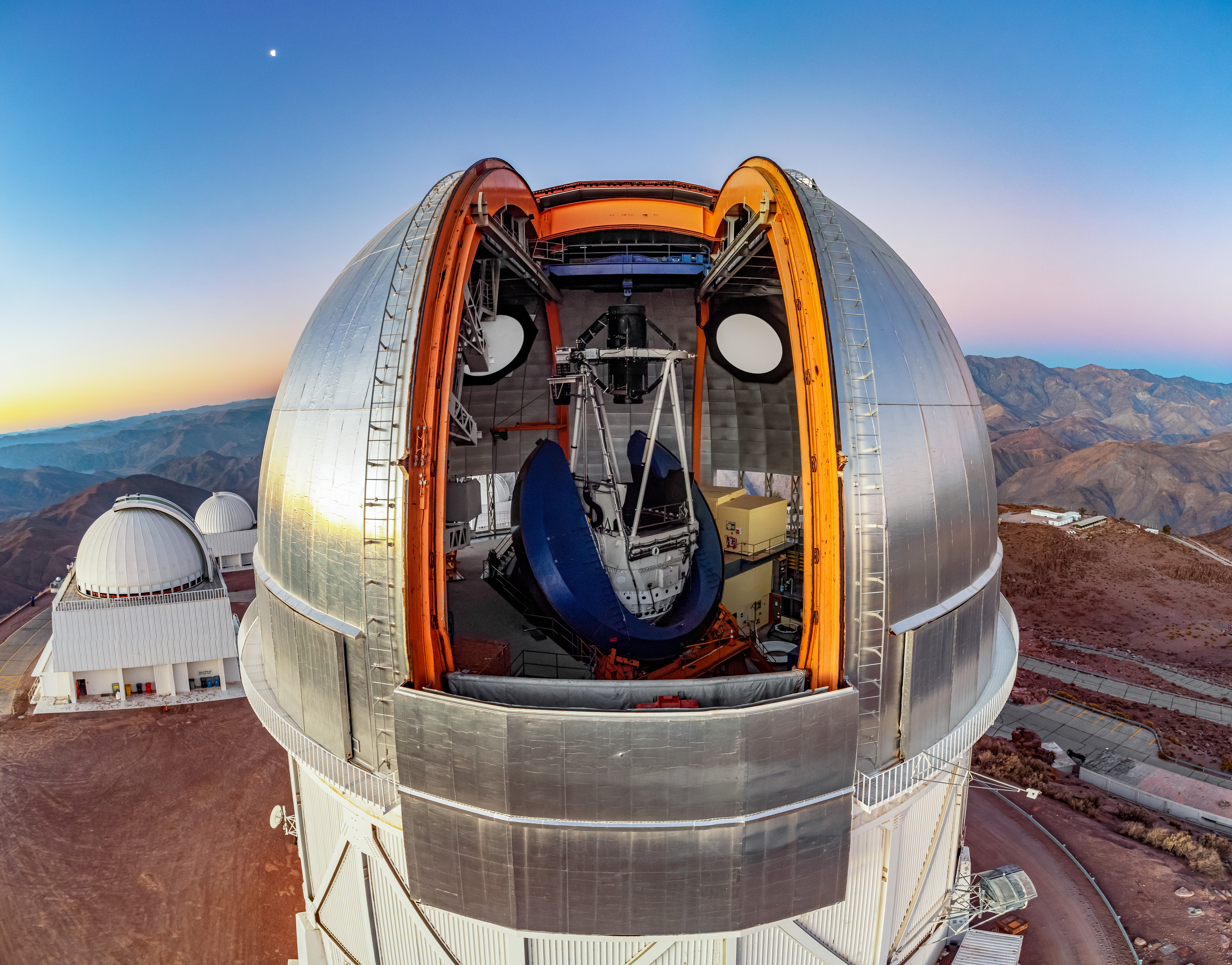
The 4.0-meter Víctor M. Blanco Telescope at Cerro Tololo Observatory, which discovered Alicanto on 6 November 2004.

Alicanto was discovered by American astronomer A. C. Becker with the ESSENCE supernova survey on 6 November 2004 observing with the 4-meter Blanco Telescope from Cerro Tololo Inter-American Observatory. Precovery images have been found back to 26 September 2000. Alicanto was observed by the Hubble Space Telescope in November 2008, and found not to have any detectable companions.

=== Naming ===
On 14 May 2021, the object was named by the Working Group for Small Bodies Nomenclature (WGSBN) after Alicanto from Chilean mythology. The nocturnal bird of the Atacama Desert has wings that shine at night with beautiful, metallic colors.

== Orbit ==
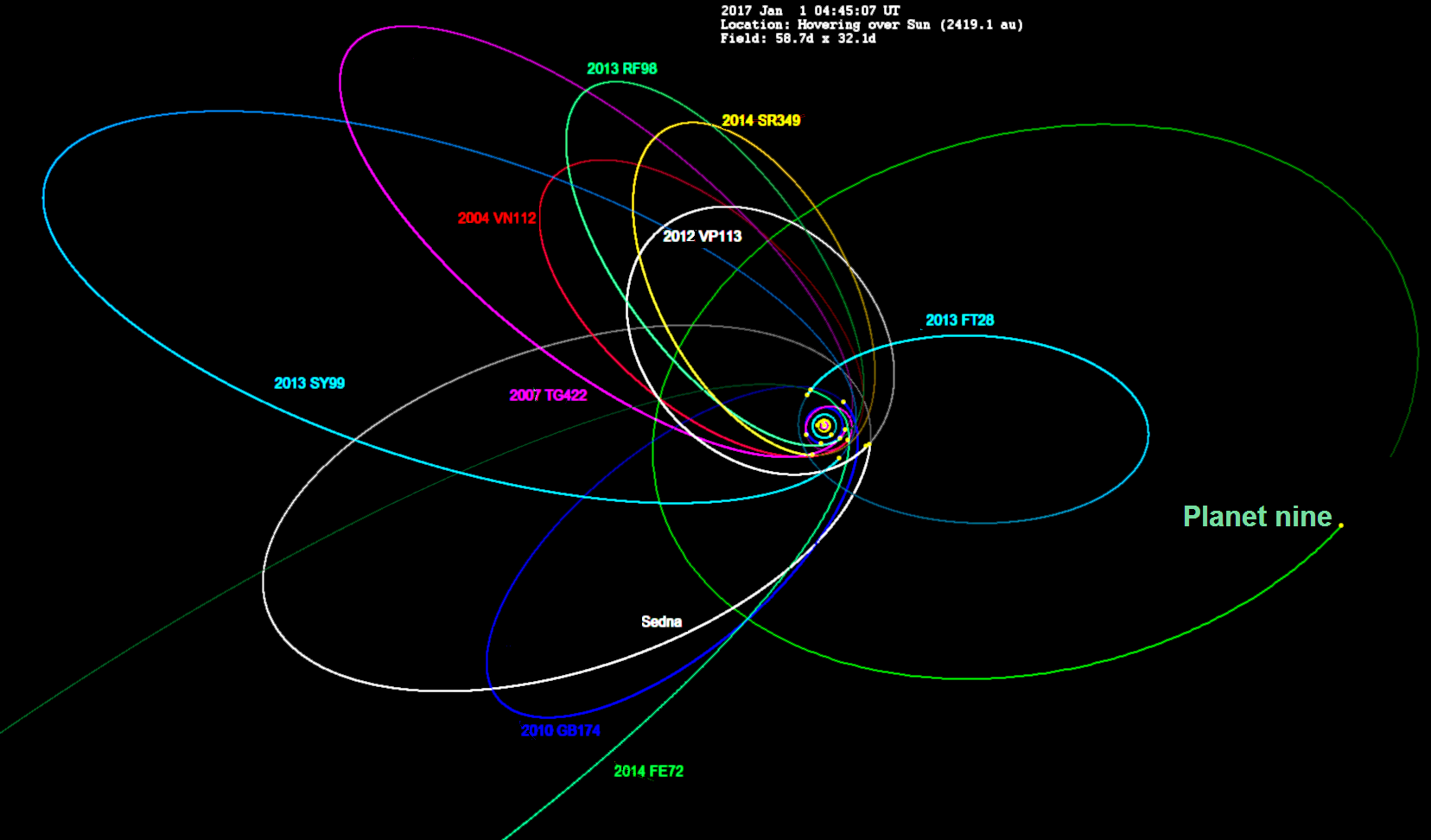
Alicanto's orbit in red with hypothetical Planet Nine

Alicanto reached perihelion (closest approach to the Sun) in 2009 and is currently 47.7 AU from the Sun. It was in the constellation of Cetus until 2019. It comes to opposition at the start of November.

With a perihelion greater than 40 AU, Alicanto is an extreme trans-Neptunian object which are practically detached from Neptune's gravitational influence. Its orbit is characterized by high eccentricity (0.850), moderate inclination (25.58°) and a semi-major axis of 316 AU. Upon discovery, it was classified as a trans-Neptunian object. Its orbit is well determined; as of 11 January 2017 its orbital solution is based on 34 observations spanning a data-arc of 5821 days. Alicanto's orbit is similar to that of 2013 RF98, indicating that they may have both been thrown onto the orbit by the same body, or that they may have been the same object (single or binary) at one point.

Numerical simulations based on models of Solar System formation suggest this object, along with Sedna, may be part of the inner edge of the Oort cloud.

A paper by Kathryn Volk and Renu Malhotra, shows that Alicanto overlaps with a 36:1 resonance with Neptune, and could be in a 36:1 resonance with the planet.

== Physical characteristics ==
=== Diameter and albedo ===
This is a size comparison of 474640 Alicanto and 4 Vesta in true color with multiple estimates as shown to the sides of the smallest estimate for Alicanto.

Alicanto has an absolute magnitude of 6.46 which gives a characteristic diameter of 140 to 300 kilometres (87 to 186 mi) for an assumed albedo in the range 0.25–0.05.

Michael Brown's website lists it with a diameter of 300 kilometres (190 mi) based on an assumed albedo of 0.04. and because of that diameter, he ranks it to be a "possibly" a dwarf planet. However, Mike Brown uses an outdated absolute magnitude of 6.7, not the newer 6.46. The albedo is expected to be low because the object has a blue (neutral) color. However, if the albedo is higher, the object could easily be half that size.

Johnston's archive estimates a diameter of 193 kilometres (120 mi) assuming an albedo of 0.124.

MinorPlanet.info estimates a diameter of 278.97 kilometres (173.34 mi), assuming an albedo of 0.057.

A planetary study by William M. Grundy suggests that trans-Neptunian objects in the 400–1000 km size range form a transition zone between small, low-density bodies and large, dense dwarf planets. Since Alicanto has an diameter of 140–300 km, it falls below this transition zone.

=== Color and spectra ===
Alicanto's visible spectrum is very different from that of 90377 Sedna. With a mean spectral slope of 12±2%/0.1 μm. The value of its spectral slope suggests that the surface of this object can have pure methane ices (like in the case of Pluto) and highly processed carbons, including some amorphous silicates. Its spectral slope is similar to that of 2013 RF98. A paper published slightly after in 2019 shows that Alicanto has a spectral slope of 11.50±4.25%/$10^3$Å.

A paper by Hainaut and colleagues measured color indices of; B-V of 0.900; V-R of 0.520; R-I of 0.450; and V-I of 0.970. with V-J, J-H, and H-K having no measured value. A earlier paper by Scott S. Sheppard measured color indices of: B-R of 1.42±0.06; V-R of 0.52±0.06; R-I of 0.45±0.06; and B-I of 1.87±0.06.

Alicanto has no measured albedo as of 2026, however there have been estimates for its albedo. Michael Brown's estimate uses an albedo of 0.04, Johnston's archive uses an albedo of 0.124. and MinorPlanet.info uses an albedo of 0.057.

A paper by Holler and colleagues using NIRSpec IFU on the James Webb Space Telescope reported that Alicanto has a "double-dip" spectrum, showing that it has an absorption feature that indicates carbon dioxide is on its surface, with a reflectance peak at around 4.26 μm indicating small grains.

== Comparison ==
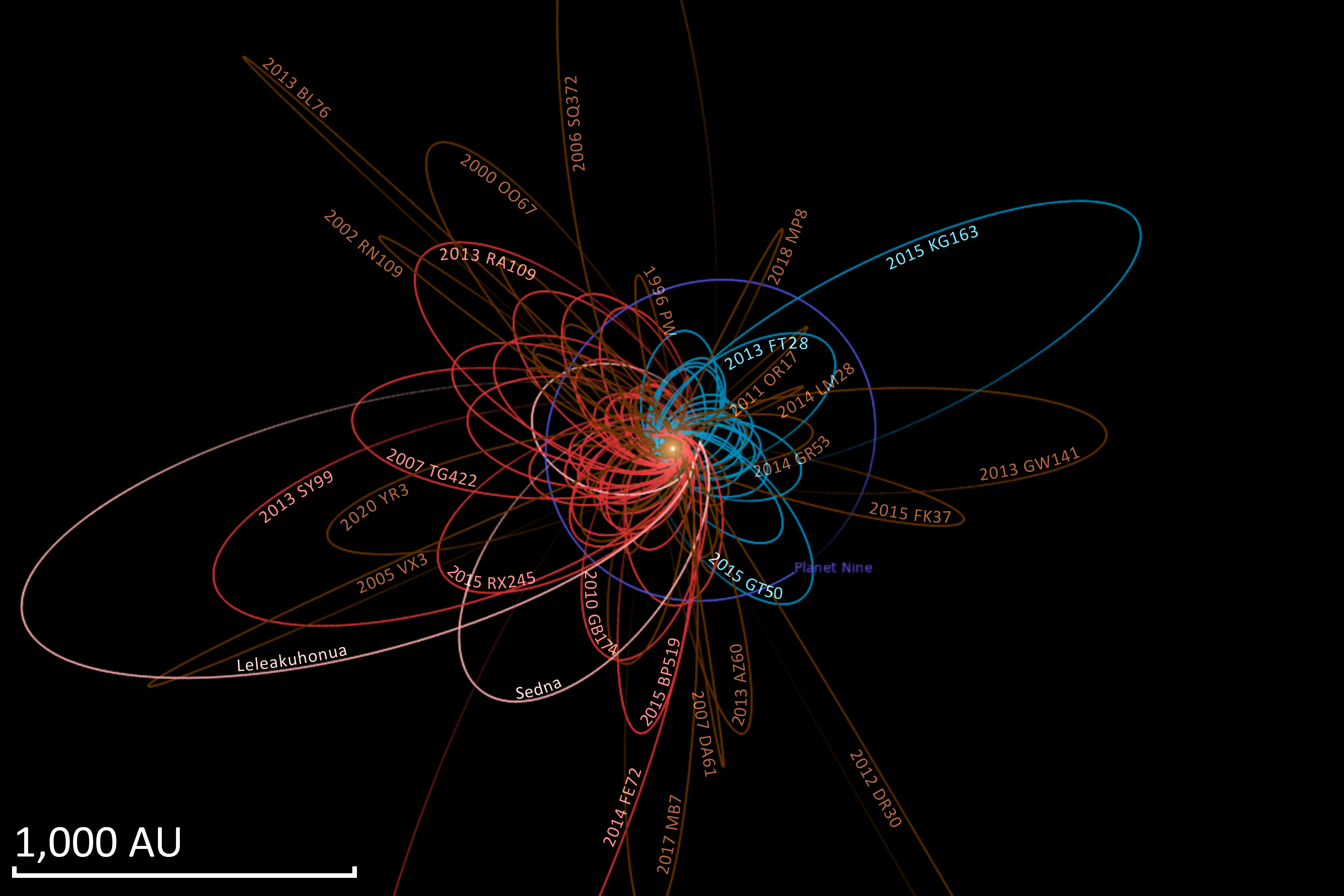
The orbits of Sedna, 2012 VP113, Leleākūhonua, and other very distant objects along with the predicted orbit of Planet Nine. The three sednoids (pink) along with the red-colored extreme trans-Neptunian object (eTNO) orbits are suspected to be aligned with the hypothetical Planet Nine while the blue-colored eTNO orbits are anti-aligned. The highly elongated orbits colored brown include centaurs and damocloids with large aphelion distances over 200 AU.

== See also ==
- List of Solar System objects by greatest aphelion
- Planet Nine

== Notes ==
1.It has also been measured to be 10.2±0.6%/0.1 μm, and 13.3±0.6%/0.1 μm, however the mean as said in the paper is 12±2%/0.1 μm.
