= C/2015 ER61 (PanSTARRS) =

Oort cloud comet

C/2015 ER_{61} (PanSTARRS)
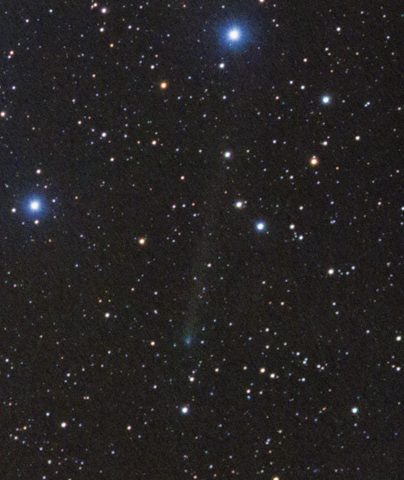
- Comet PanSTARRS and the Pleiades cluster photographed from Italy on 22 August 2017

Discovery
- Discovered by: Pan-STARRS 1 (F51)
- Discovery date: 15 March 2015

Orbital characteristics
- Epoch: 7 May 2017 (JD 2457880.5)
- Observation arc: 1.96 yr
- Aphelion: 2456±62 AU; 1425/854 AU
- Perihelion: 1.0421 AU
- Semi-major axis: 1229±31 AU; 715/428 AU
- Eccentricity: 0.99730
- Orbital period: 7591 years; 9000 years (epoch 2050)
- Inclination: 6.3490°
- Longitude of ascending node: 235.21°
- Argument of periapsis: 68.197°
- Earth MOID: 0.1016 AU
- Mars MOID: <0.00005 AU
- Jupiter MOID: 0.0794 AU
- Saturn MOID: 0.2869 AU

Physical characteristics
- Dimensions: 2.6–2.8 km (1.6–1.7 mi)
- Mean diameter: 2.75 km (1.71 mi)
- Mean density: 430±70 kg/m^{3}
- Comet total magnitude (M1): 14.74

C/2015 ER_{61} (PanSTARRS) is a comet and inner Oort cloud object. When classified as a minor planet, it had the fourth-largest aphelion of any known minor planet in the Solar System, after 2005 VX3, 2012 DR30, and 2013 BL76. It additionally had the most eccentric orbit of any known minor planet, with its distance from the Sun varying by about 99.9% during the course of its orbit, followed by 2005 VX3 with an eccentricity of 0.9973. On 30 January 2016, it was classified as a comet when it was 5.7 AU from the Sun. It comes close to Jupiter, and a close approach in the past threw it on the distant orbit it is on now.

Though the comet nucleus was probably mildly active, early asteroidal estimates gave an absolute magnitude (H) of 12.3, which would suggest a nucleus as large as 8–20 km in diameter. But it could easily be half that size due to activity brightening the nucleus.

== 2017 perihelion ==
C/2015 ER_{61} was discovered on 15 March 2015 when it was 8.44 AU from the Sun, and magnitude 21.5. By early February 2016, the object reached magnitude 20, and made a close approach to Jupiter on 28 March 2016 of 0.9245 AU. This changed its orbit, significantly decreasing its aphelion distance from 1430 AU to ~1200 AU, and as it passed through the inner Solar System its aphelion decreased to 770 AU, and by 2020 it had an aphelion of 854 AU.

The barycentric orbital period will decrease from 19000 years (epoch 1950) to 9000 years (epoch 2050).

As of January 2017, it was magnitude 13, and increasing in brightness. On 4 April 2017, it was detected outbursting to magnitude 6.5. On 19 April 2017, it reached its closest point to Earth of ~1.2 AU. At this point, it was about apparent magnitude 8, and, assuming a size of 20 km, have an apparent size of 19 mas. It came to perihelion (closest approach to the Sun) on 10 May 2017. It will not be 50 AU from the Sun until 2045.

== Orbital elements table ==
Dist. from Sun	Event	Epoch	Aphelion (Q)	Perihelion (q)	Semi-major axis (a)	Eccentricity (e)	Period (p)	Inclination (i)	Longitude ascending node (Ω)	Mean anomaly (M)	Argument of perihelion (ω)
(AU)			(AU)				(years)	(°)			
36.5		2000-01-01	1423.4	1.05378	712.2	0.99852	18,990	6.12745	239.06	359.671	63.99
20.2		2010-01-01	1435.4	1.05377	718.2	0.99853	19,240	6.12732	239.03	359.862	64.01
9.01		2015-01-01	1430.8	1.05347	715.9	0.99853	19,140	6.12819	238.97	359.956	64.08
8.44	discovery	2015-03-15	1436.1	1.05313	718.6	0.99853	19,250	6.12879	238.95	359.960	64.11
6.00		2016-01-01	1667.3	1.04763	834.2	0.99874	24,080	6.15827	238.25	359.980	64.92
5.204	Jupiter approach	2016-03-28	1291.9	1.04030	646.5	0.99839	16,420	6.24250	236.73	359.976	66.64
2.242		2017-01-01	324.6	1.03505	162.8	0.99364	2,080	6.34928	235.27	359.939	68.46
1.079	Earth approach	2017-04-04	164.3	1.03830	82.7	0.98744	750	6.34595	235.27	359.953	68.30
1.0397	Perihelion	2017-05-10	210.0	1.03973	105.5	0.99015	1,080	6.34423	235.25	0.0004	67.92
3.437		2018-01-01	1091.1	1.04449	546.1	0.99809	12,750	6.34438	235.23	0.018	68.27
9.78		2020-01-01	857.8	1.04583	429.4	0.99756	8,890	6.34009	235.21	0.107	68.29
56.03		2050-01-01	854.6	1.04649	427.8	0.99755	8,840	6.33543	235.18	1.329	68.34

== Comparison ==
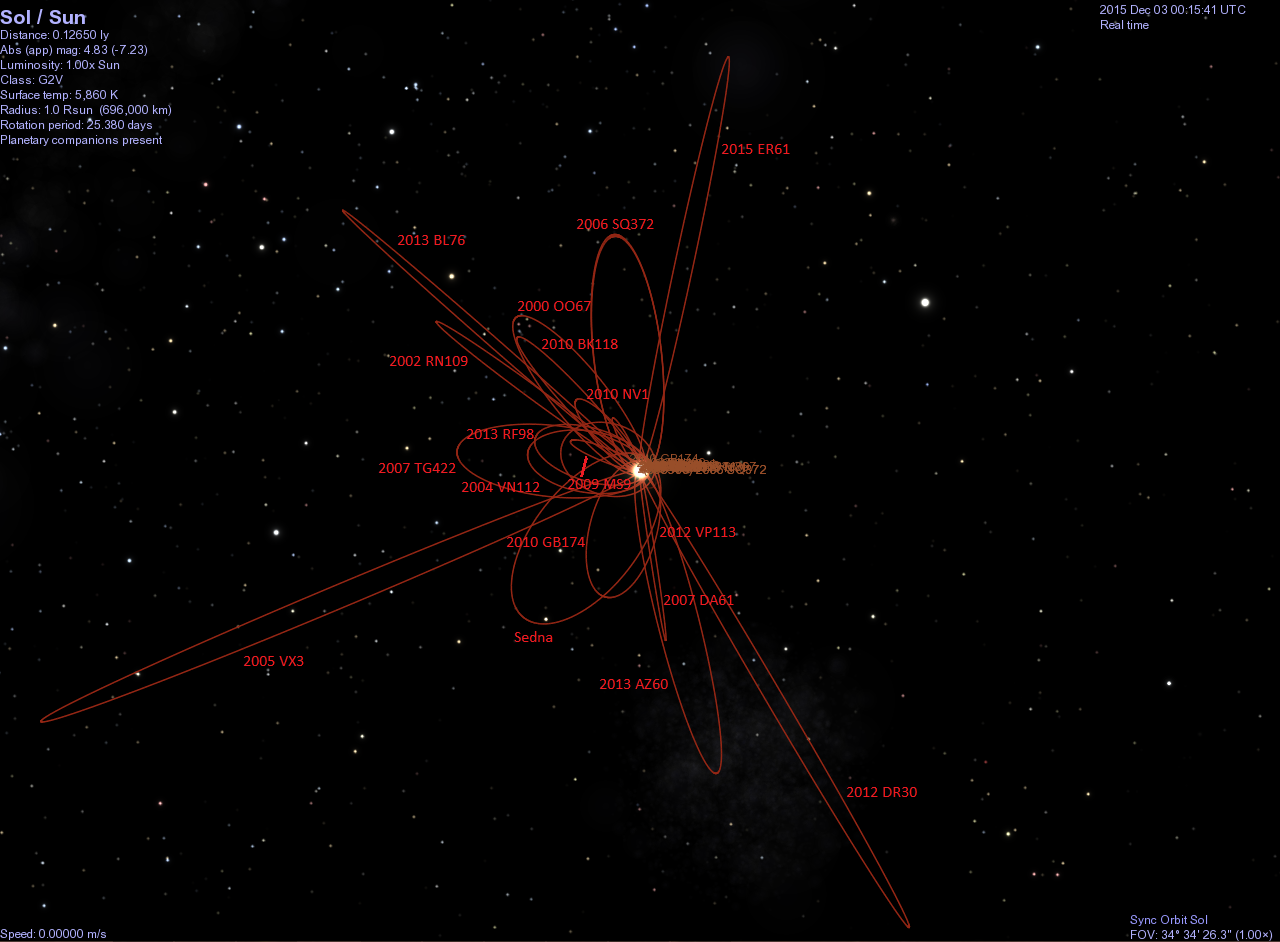
Sedna compared to some other very distant orbiting bodies including 2015 DB_{216} (orbit wrong), 2000 OO_{67}, 474640 Alicanto, 2005 VX3, 2006 SQ_{372}, 2007 TG422, 2007 DA61, 2009 MS_{9}, 2010 GB174, 2010 NV_{1}, 2010 BK118, 2012 DR30, 2012 VP113, 2013 BL76, 2013 AZ60, 2013 RF98, 2015 ER61

== See also ==
- List of Solar System objects by greatest aphelion

== Notes ==
Because 2015 ER_{61}'s orbit takes it so far from the Sun, a more accurate value for its orbit is a barycentric solution. Additionally, a close approach to Jupiter in 2016, and a travel through the inner solar system in 2017 drastically changes its orbit. Therefore, orbits for 2000–2016 and 2018–2100 are provided, respectively.
