= List of Solar System objects by greatest aphelion =

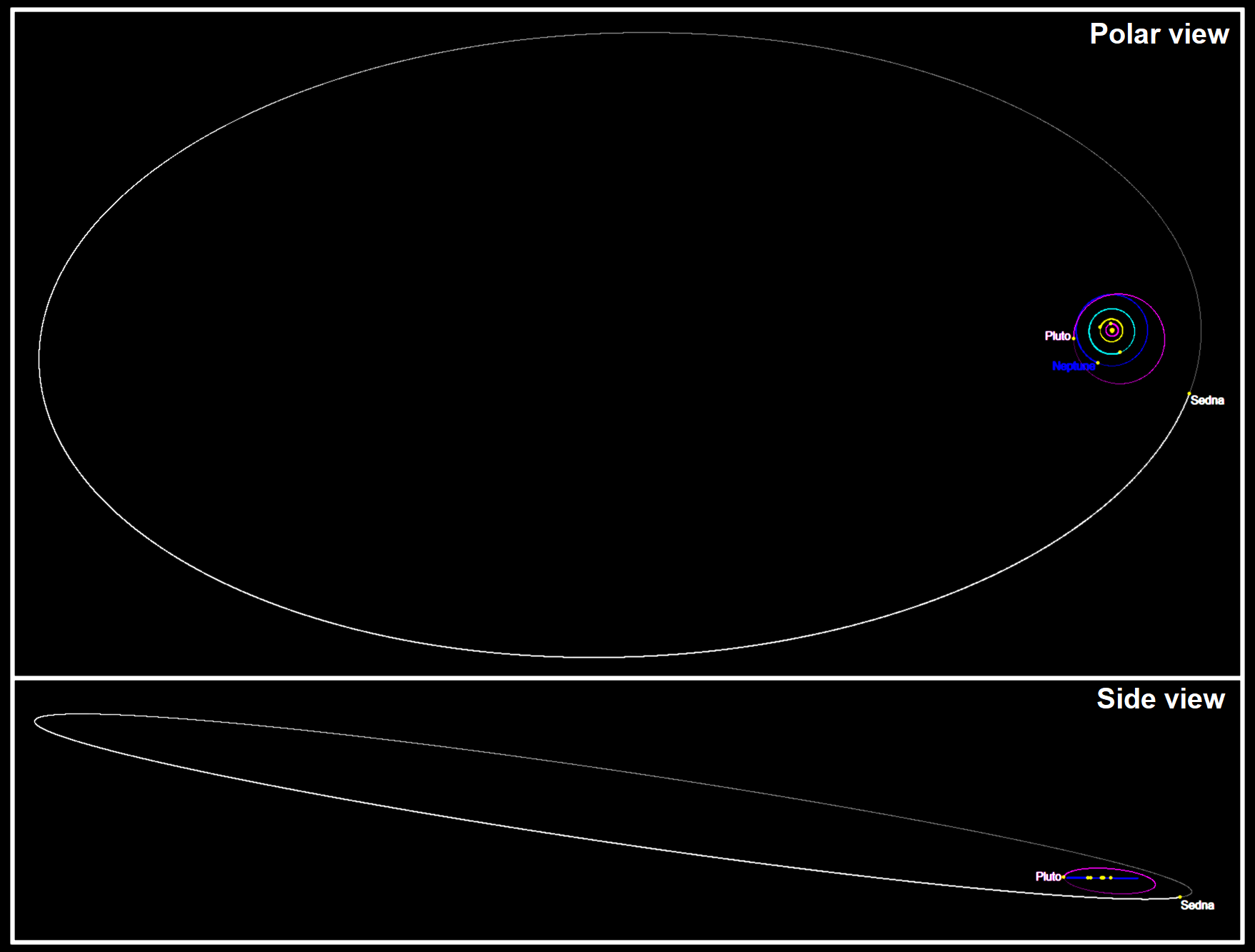
The orbit of Sedna (red) set against the orbits of outer Solar System objects (Pluto's orbit is purple).

This is a list of Solar System objects by greatest aphelion or the greatest distance from the Sun that the orbit could take it if the Sun and object were the only objects in the universe. It is implied that the object is orbiting the Sun in a two-body solution without the influence of the planets, passing stars, or the galaxy. The aphelion can change significantly due to the gravitational influence of planets and other stars. Most of these objects are comets on a calculated path and may not be directly observable. For instance, comet Hale-Bopp was last seen in 2013 at magnitude 24 and continues to fade, making it invisible to all but the most powerful telescopes.

The maximum extent of the region in which the Sun's gravitational field is dominant, the Hill sphere, may extend to 230,000 astronomical units (3.6 light-years) as calculated in the 1960s. But any comet currently more than about 150,000 AU (2 ly) from the Sun can be considered lost to the interstellar medium. The nearest known star is Proxima Centauri at 269,000 AU (4.25 ly), followed by Alpha Centauri at about 4.35 light years.

Oort cloud comets orbit the Sun at great distances, but can then be perturbed by passing stars and the galactic tides. As they come into or leave the inner Solar System they may have their orbit changed by the planets, or alternatively be ejected from the Solar System. It is also possible they may collide with the Sun or a planet.

S/2021 N 1 (the outermost moon of Neptune) takes over 27 years to orbit Neptune, comets can take up to 30 million years to orbit the Sun, and the Sun orbits the Milky Way in about 230 million years (a galactic year).

Satellite orbital period vs parent body orbital period
Satellite	Orbital period (years)	Parent body	Percentage of parent body orbital period
S/2021 N 1	27.4	Neptune	16.6%
Oort cloud comet	30 million	Sun	13%
Sun	230 million	Milky Way	N/A

== Explanation ==
=== Barycentric vs heliocentric orbits ===
Motion of the Solar System's barycenter relative to the Sun

As many of the objects listed below have some of the most extreme orbits of any objects in the Solar System, describing their orbit precisely can be particularly difficult and sensitive to the time the orbit is defined at. For most objects in the Solar System, a heliocentric reference frame (relative to the gravitational center of the Sun) is sufficient to explain their orbits. However, as the orbits of objects become closer to the Solar System's escape velocity, with long orbital periods on the order of hundreds or thousands of years, a different reference frame is required to describe their orbit: a barycentric reference frame. A barycentric reference frame measures the object's orbit relative to the gravitational center of the entire Solar System, rather than just the Sun. Mostly due to the influence of the outer gas giants, the Solar System barycenter varies by up to twice the radius of the Sun.

This difference in position can lead to significant changes in the orbits of long-period comets and distant asteroids. Many comets have hyperbolic (unbound) orbits in a heliocentric reference frame, but in a barycentric reference frame have much more firmly bound orbits, with only a small handful remaining truly hyperbolic.

=== Eccentricity and V_{inf} ===
The orbital parameter used to describe how non-circular an object's orbit is, is eccentricity (e). An object with an e of 0 has a perfectly circular orbit, with its perihelion distance being just as close to the Sun as its aphelion distance. An object with an e of between 0 and 1 will have a bound elliptical orbit. For example, an object with an e of ⅓ (0.3̅3̅3̅) will have a perihelion twice as close to the Sun as its aphelion. As an object's e approaches 1, its orbit will be more and more elongated, and at e=1, the object's orbit will be parabolic and unbound to the Solar System (i.e. not returning for another orbit). An e greater than 1 will produce a hyperbolic orbit and still be unbound to the Solar System.

Although it describes how "unbound" an object's orbit is, eccentricity does not necessarily reflect how high an incoming velocity said object had before entering the Solar System (a parameter known as V_{infinity}, or V_{inf}). A clear example of this is the eccentricities of the two known interstellar objects as of October 2019, 1I/ʻOumuamua and 2I/Borisov. ʻOumuamua had an incoming V_{inf} of 26.5 kilometres per second (59,000 mph), but due to its low perihelion distance of only 0.255 AU, it had an eccentricity of 1.200. However, Borisov's V_{inf} was only slightly higher, at 32.3 km/s (72,000 mph), but due to its higher perihelion distance of ~2.003 AU, its eccentricity was a comparably higher 3.340. In practice, no object originating from the Solar System should have an incoming heliocentric eccentricity much higher than 1, and should rarely have an incoming barycentric eccentricity of above 1, as that would imply that the object had originated from an indefinitely far distance from the Sun.

=== Orbital epochs ===
Due to having the most eccentric orbits of any Solar System body, a comet's orbit typically intersects one or more of the planets in the Solar System. As a result, the orbit of a comet is frequently perturbed significantly, even over the course of a single pass through the inner Solar System. Due to the changing orbit, it is necessary to provide a calculation of the orbit of the comet (or similarly orbiting body) both before and after entering the inner Solar System. For example, Comet ISON was ~312 AU from the Sun in 1600, and its remnants will be ~431 AU from the Sun in 2400, both well outside of any significant gravitational influence from the planets.

== Comets with greatest aphelion (2 body heliocentric) ==
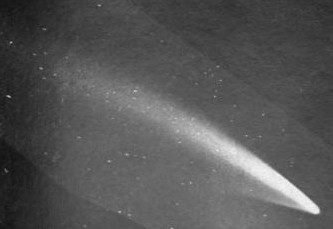
C/1910 A1 during its 1910 close approach

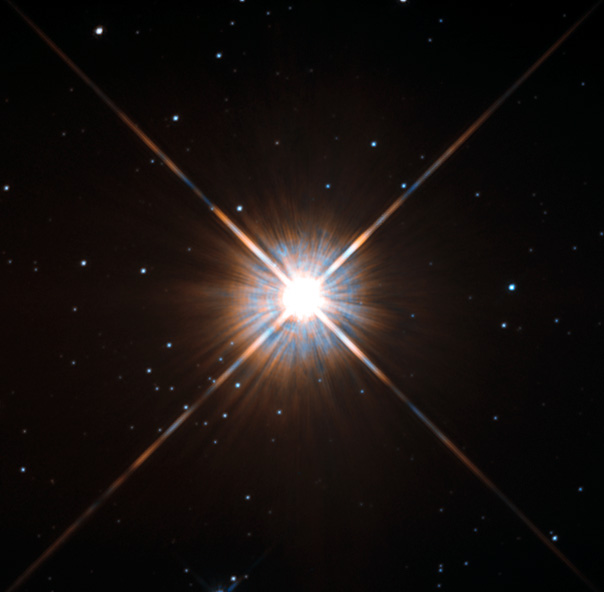
Proxima Centauri is 271,000 AU or 4.25 light years away

Object	Heliocentric Aphelion (Q) (Sun) Perihelion epoch	Barycentric Aphelion (AD) (Sun+Jupiter) epoch 2200	Barycentric Aphelion epoch 1800
C/2004 R2 (ASAS)	3,238,164 AU (51 ly)	13000 AU	4000 AU
C/2015 O1 (PANSTARRS)	1,302,400 AU (21 ly)	15000 AU	60000 AU
C/2012 S4 (PANSTARRS)	504,443 AU (8.0 ly)	5700 AU	8400 AU
C/2012 CH_{17} (MOSS)	279,825 AU (4.4 ly)	7283 AU	26000 AU
C/2008 C1 (Chen-Gao)	203,253 AU (3.2 ly)	3822 AU	520 AU
C/1992 J1 (Spacewatch)	226,867 AU (3.6 ly)	3700 AU	75000 AU
C/2007 N3 (Lulin)	144,828 AU (2.3 ly)	2419 AU	64000 AU
C/2017 T2 (PANSTARRS)	117,212 AU (1.9 ly)	2975 AU	84000 AU
C/1937 N1 (Finsler)	115,031 AU (1.8 ly)	7121 AU	16000 AU
C/1972 X1 (Araya)	108,011 AU (1.7 ly)	5630 AU	4200 AU
C/2014 R3 (PANSTARRS)	80,260 AU (1.3 ly)	12841 AU	19000 AU
C/2015 O1 (PANSTARRS)	77,092 AU (1.2 ly)	21753 AU	52000 AU
C/2001 C1 (LINEAR)	76,230 AU (1.2 ly)	ejection	98000 AU
C/2002 J4 (NEAT)	57,793 AU (0.91 ly)	ejection	59000 AU
C/1958 D1 (Burnham)	46,408 AU (0.73 ly)	1110 AU	7800 AU
C/1986 V1 (Sorrells)	37,825 AU (0.60 ly)	8946 AU	5400 AU
C/2005 G1 (LINEAR)	37,498 AU (0.59 ly)	40572 AU	110000 AU
C/2006 W3 (Christensen)	35,975 AU (0.57 ly)	8212 AU	5300 AU
C/2009 W2 (Boattini)	31,059 AU (0.49 ly)	3847 AU	4200 AU
C/2005 L3 (McNaught)	26,779 AU (0.42 ly)	6851 AU	33000 AU
C/2004 YJ_{35} (LINEAR)	26,433 AU (0.42 ly)	2480 AU	75000 AU
C/2003 H3 (NEAT)	26,340 AU (0.42 ly)	ejection	4900 AU
C/2010 L3 (Catalina)	25,609 AU (0.40 ly)	21094 AU	12000 AU
C/1902 R1 (Perrine)	25,066 AU (0.40 ly)	2306 AU	74000 AU
C/1889 G1 (Barnard)	24,784 AU (0.39 ly)	1575 AU	2100 AU
C/2007 VO_{53} (Spacewatch)	24,383 AU (0.39 ly)	16835 AU	22000 AU

=== Distant comets with long observation arcs and/or barycentric ===
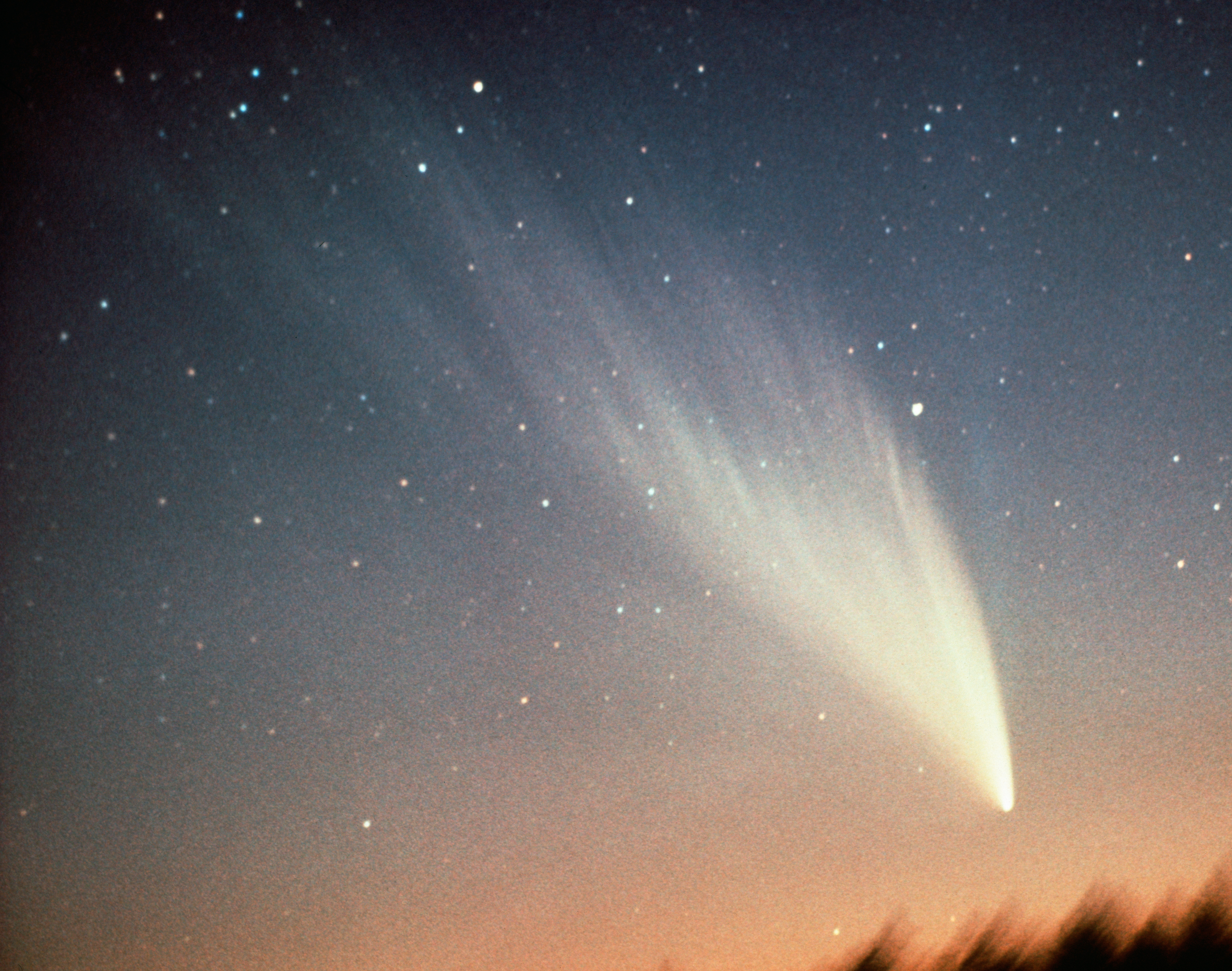
Comet West in 1976

Examples of comets with a more well-determined orbit. Comets are extremely small relative to other bodies and hard to observe once they stop outgassing (see Coma (cometary)). Because they are typically discovered close to the Sun, it will take some time even thousands of years for them to actually travel out to great distances. The Whipple proposal might be able to detect Oort cloud objects at great distances, but probably not a particular object.

- Comet West 70,000 AU (1.1 light-years)
- C/1999 F1 (Catalina) 66,600 AU (1.05 light-years)
- C/2012 S4 (PANSTARRS) 5700 AU (barycentric)
- Comet Hyakutake (C/1996 B2) 3410 AU
- C/1910 A1 (Great January comet) about 2974 AU (barycentric)
- C/1992 J1 (Spacewatch) 3650 AU
- C/2007 N3 (Lulin) 2400 AU

== Minor planets ==
Number of minor planets (January 2024)
Aphelion in AU	Number of minor planets
400–800	36
800–1200	15
1200–1600	7
1600–2000	4
2000–2400	5
2400–2800	2
2800+	3

A large number of trans-Neptunian objects (TNOs) – minor planets orbiting beyond the orbit of Neptune – have been discovered in recent years. Many TNOs have orbits that take them far beyond Pluto's aphelion of 49.3 AU. Some of these TNOs with an extreme aphelion are detached objects such as 2010 GB174, which always reside in the outermost region of the Solar System, while for other TNOs, the extreme aphelion is due to an exceptionally high eccentricity such as for 2005 VX3, which orbits the Sun at a distance between 4.1 (closer than Jupiter) and 2200 AU (70 times farther from the Sun than Neptune). The following is a list of minor planets with the largest aphelion in descending order.

=== Minor planets with a heliocentric aphelion greater than 400 AU ===
The following group of bodies have orbits with an aphelion above 400 AU, with 1-sigma uncertainties given to two significant digits. As of May 2024, there are 73 such bodies.

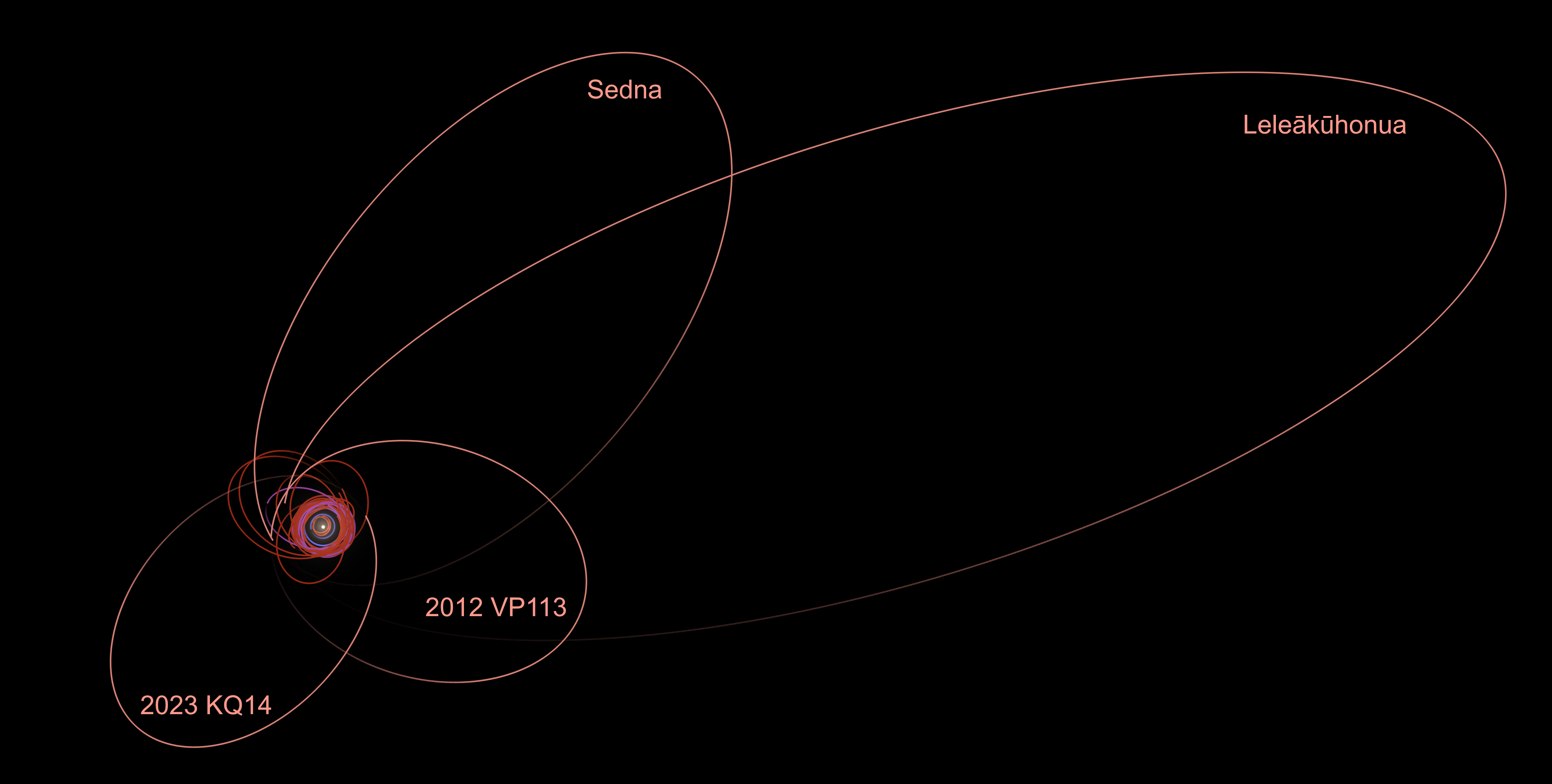
Orbits of the four known sednoids: Sedna, 2012 VP113, Leleākūhonua, and 2023 KQ14.

Object	Aphelion (AU)	Absolute Magnitude (H)	Ref
A/2020 M4	29020.06 ±420	14.01 ±0.28	MPC · JPL
2020 MQ53	27826.05 ±6255400	8.65 ± 0.52046	MPC · JPL
A/2025 A7	8044.16 ±1265.2	15.423±0.40546	MPC · JPL
2014 FE72	5337.66 ±498.4	6.19	MPC · JPL
2026 EB130	4680.92	7.29	MPC · JPL
2017 MB7	3454.95 ±65.26	14.21 ±0.33	MPC · JPL
2019 EU5	2635.65 ±726.24	6.35 ±0.13643	MPC · JPL
541132 Leleākūhonua	2627.26 ±19.70	5.57 ±0.13	MPC · JPL
(709487) 2013 BL76	2482.32 ±2.86	10.88	MPC · JPL
2005 VX3	2230.08 ±501.86	14.1	MPC · JPL
A/2019 N2	2115.34 ±687.8	12.804±0.42569	MPC · JPL
2025 MP387	1959.94	7.51	MPC · JPL
A/2022 B3	1957.25 ±11.31	16.563±0.76362	MPC · JPL
(668643) 2012 DR30	1945.43 ±1.36	7.12	MPC · JPL
2021 RR205	1842.46 ±9.93	6.74±0.12	MPC · JPL
2021 DK18	1674.09 ±168.75	6.75±0.12	MPC · JPL
2017 OF201	1602.13 ±5.36	3.49±0.45	MPC · JPL
2025 NK497	1590.69	6.90	MPC · JPL
(308933) 2006 SQ372	1586.54 ±0.95	7.94	MPC · JPL
2013 SY99	1575.87 ±5.73	6.83	MPC · JPL
2025 OV697	1413.12 ±5.73	8.43	MPC · JPL
A/2021 E4	1375.29 ±0.84	14.258 ±0.447	MPC · JPL
2015 FC493	1357.29 ±511620	8.18 ±0.38	MPC · JPL
2021 DK18	1418.77 ±320	6.72 ±0.24	MPC · JPL
A/2019 G2	1397.41 ±1.7	16.31 ±0.55	MPC · JPL
A/2021 E4	1388.62 ±1.2	14.26 ±0.45	MPC · JPL
A/2018 W3	1341.59 ±10	10.70 ±0.29	MPC · JPL
(87269) 2000 OO67	1326.78 ±0.76	9.10	MPC · JPL
2002 RN109	1295.34 ±51	15.30	MPC · JPL
2015 KG163	1241.82 ±7.2	8.20	MPC · JPL
(523622) 2007 TG422	1118.81 ±0.64	6.47	MPC · JPL
2015 SA57	1052.34 ±0.51	9.92 ±0.37	MPC · JPL
2013 GW141	1032.63 ±0.62	8.16 ±0.35	MPC · JPL
2012 KA51	1015.61 ±9.9	11.74 ±0.79	MPC · JPL
(765047) 2013 RA109	1008.19 ±2.7	6.23 ±0.22	MPC · JPL
90377 Sedna	1006.90±2.7	1.50	MPC · JPL
2020 QN6	990.67 ±0.62	14.55 ±0.37	MPC · JPL
2014 GQ101	986.20 ±0.37	10.56 ±0.43	MPC · JPL
768325 Geyagugv	933.55 ±2.5	4.34	MPC · JPL
2015 RX245	888.63 ±8.1	6.20	MPC · JPL
2015 AD298	859.76 ±4.7	8.38 ±0.52	MPC · JPL
2015 FK37	853.72 ±1.7	14.50 ±0.26	MPC · JPL
(773721) 2020 YR3	846.98 ±0.49	9.30 ±0.42	MPC · JPL
2010 BK118	828.61 ±0.46	10.30	MPC · JPL
2007 DA61	816.45 ±11	14.90 ±0.47	MPC · JPL
2013 RF98	776.26 ±30	8.70	MPC · JPL
2014 SX403	773.46 ±4.1	7.06 ±0.32	MPC · JPL
(418993) 2009 MS9	767.45 ±0.085	9.74	MPC · JPL
2013 AZ60	762.63 ±0.1	10.30	MPC · JPL
2014 RK86	753.12 ±16	8.22 ±0.31	MPC · JPL
2018 MP8	732.44 ±7.7	15.30	MPC · JPL
2016 SD106	731.06±7.6	6.70 ±0.33	MPC · JPL
2014 TU115	704.80 ±2.0	7.86 ±0.44	MPC · JPL
2021 CP5	689.35±0.57	12.23 ±0.41	MPC · JPL
2022 LO17	684.64 ±270000	8.52 ±0.10	MPC · JPL
A/2020 H9	680.42 ±1.1	17.70 ±0.34	MPC · JPL
474640 Alicanto	663.36 ±2.3	6.46	MPC · JPL
(765133) 2013 SL102	653.9 ±0.91	7.13 ±0.33	MPC · JPL
2017 UR52	650.82 ±140	21.20	MPC · JPL
(689335) 2013 FL28	648.32 ±0.27	8.07 ±0.44	MPC · JPL
2021 PN72	637.57 ±0.22	12.04 ±0.18	MPC · JPL
2010 GB174	630.26 ±14	6.74	MPC · JPL
2014 SR349	601.90 ±2.4	6.46	MPC · JPL
2011 OR17	579.67 ±0.35	13.10	MPC · JPL
(336756) 2010 NV1	570.60 ±0.17	10.55	MPC · JPL
2014 WB556	560.73 ±1.2	7.26 ±0.27	MPC · JPL
2015 GT50	554.67 ±4.5	8.50	MPC · JPL
1996 PW	552.06 ±0.56	13.90	MPC · JPL
2018 VM35	545.94 ±34	7.76 ±0.05	MPC · JPL
(523719) 2014 LM28	543.67 ±0.15	9.95	MPC · JPL
2013 FT28	519.49 ±2.7	7.20	MPC · JPL
2017 SN33	511.63 ±16	17.90	MPC · JPL
2015 DM319	505.11 ±2.3	8.78 ±0.11	MPC · JPL
2016 SA59	484.56 ±1.2	7.81 ±0.36	MPC · JPL
(582301) 2015 RM306	480.63 ±0.028	11.06 ±0.44	MPC · JPL
2012 VP113	467.17 ±0.99	4.09	MPC · JPL
2016 SG58	464.64±0.39	7.50 ±0.41	MPC · JPL
2015 RY245	449.66 ±9.0	8.90	MPC · JPL
A/2021 E2	430.46 ±8.3	17.90 ±0.44	MPC · JPL
2014 QW510	411.63 ±0.32	7.53 ±0.24	MPC · JPL
(148209) 2000 CR105	400.29 ±1.2	6.14	MPC · JPL

=== Greatest barycentric aphelion ===
The following minor planets have an incoming barycentric aphelion of at least 1000 AU.

name	diameter (km) (assumed)	perihelion (AU)	Barycentric aphelion (AU) (1800)	Barycentric aphelion (AU) (2200)	Change (%)
A/2020 M4	5.2	5.95	5558	4484	-24
2014 FE72	206.8	36.33	4071	4051	-0.49
2002 RN109	3.0	2.691	2279	1180	-93
2005 VX3	5.2	4.106	2478	1913	-30
541132 Leleākūhonua	272.6	65.08	2322	2323	0
A/2022 B3	1.9	3.708	2100	2540	+21
2017 MB7	5.2	4.456	2040	2840	+28
(668643) 2012 DR30	130.5	14.57	2000	2050	+2.4
(709487) 2013 BL76	23.7	8.355	1850	1920	+3.6
2017 OF201	700	44.9	1610	1612	0
(308933) 2006 SQ372	94.5	24.14	1540	1560	+1.3
2013 SY99	156.8	50.03	1410	1410	0
2015 KG163	78.6	40.50	1320	1320	0
2013 AZ60	29.9	7.927	1260	827	-34
2007 DA61	3.6	2.677	1190	852	-28
2013 GW141	78.6	23.52	1130	1120	-0.9
(87269) 2000 OO67	49.6	20.73	1120	1070	-4.5

== Comparison ==
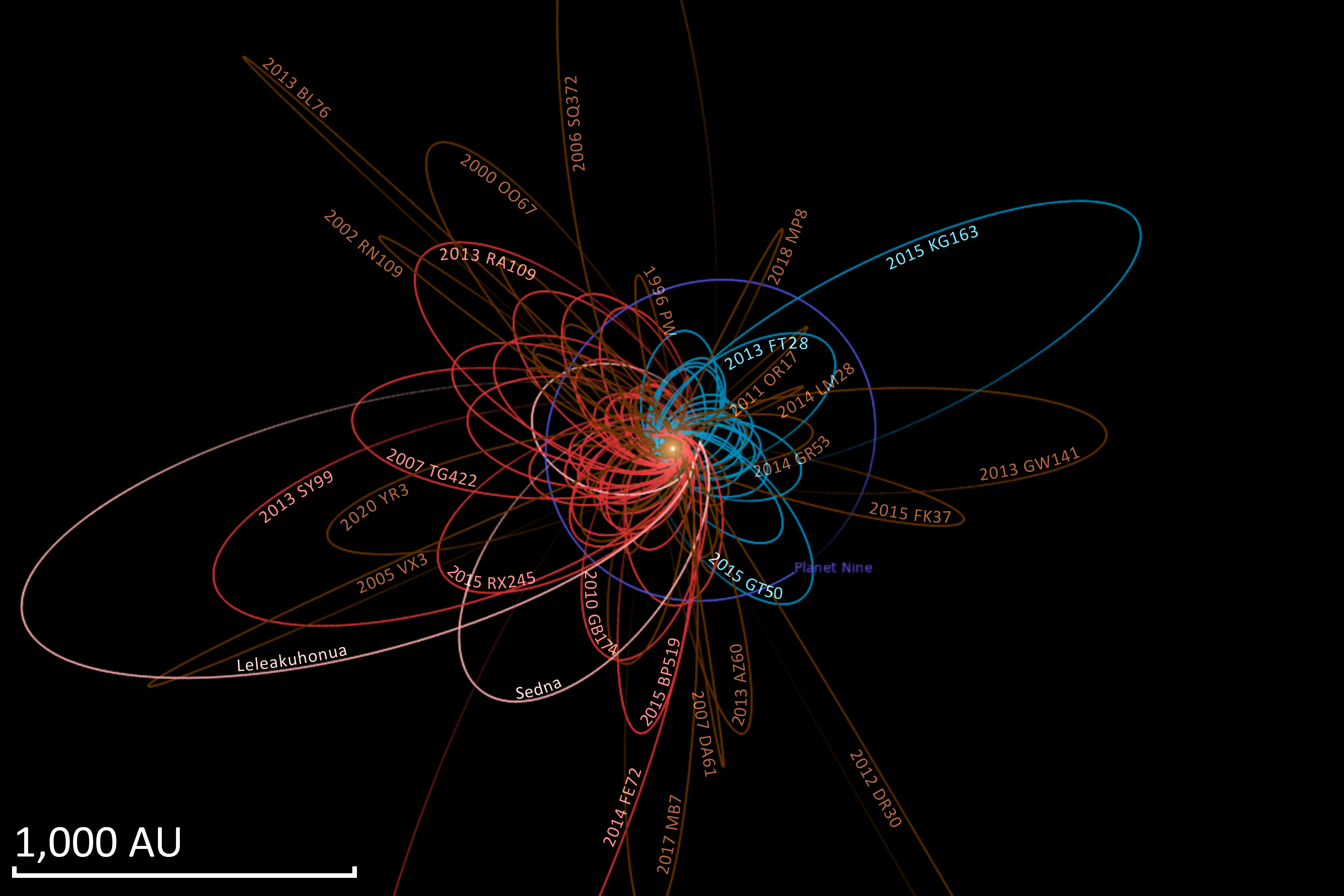
The orbit of Sedna, 2012 VP113, Leleākūhonua, and other very distant objects along with the predicted orbit of Planet Nine. The three sednoids (pink) along with the red-colored extreme trans-Neptunian object (eTNO) orbits are suspected to be aligned with the hypothetical Planet Nine while the blue-colored eTNO orbits are anti-aligned. The highly elongated orbits colored brown include centaurs and damocloids with large aphelion distances over 200 AU.

== See also ==
- List of trans-Neptunian objects (numbered minor planets only)
- List of unnumbered trans-Neptunian objects
- List of artificial objects leaving the Solar System
- List of Solar System objects most distant from the Sun (then-year distance from the Sun)
- List of nearest stars and brown dwarfs
- List of the most distant astronomical objects

About comets

- List of hyperbolic comets
- List of comets with no meaningful orbit
- List of near-parabolic comets
- List of periodic comets
- List of numbered comets
- Interstellar object

Objects of interest

- 1996 PW
- C/2015 ER61
- C/1980 E1

Others

- Oort cloud – Distant planetesimals in the Solar System
- Kuiper belt – Area of the Solar System beyond the planets, comprising small bodies
- Sednoid – Group of trans-Neptunian objects
- Detached object – Dynamical class of minor planets
