= 2015 TH367 =

Trans-Neptunian object

2015 TH_{367}
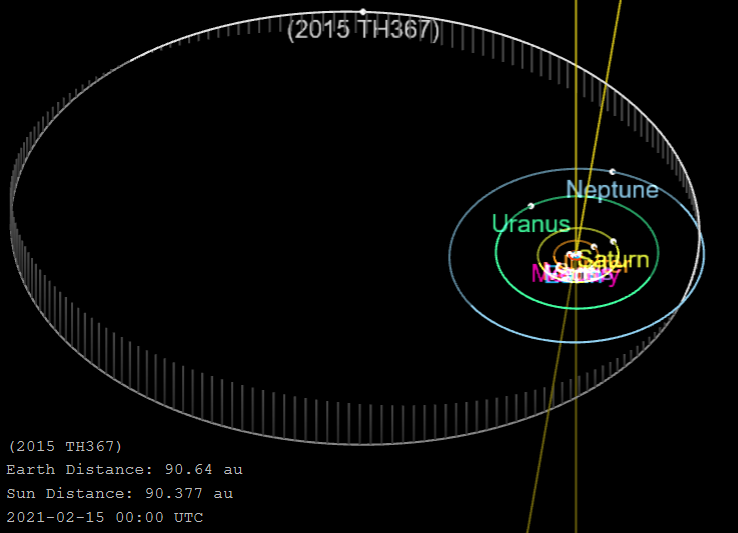
- Orbit and current position of 2015 TH_{367}

Discovery
- Discovered by: D. J. Tholen; S. S. Sheppard; C. W. Trujillo
- Discovery site: Mauna Kea Obs.
- Discovery date: 13 October 2015 (first observed only)

Designations
- Alternative designations: V774104 (internal designation)
- Minor planet category: TNO · SDO distant

Orbital characteristics
- Epoch 2015-Dec-05 (JD 2457361.5)
- Uncertainty parameter 8
- Observation arc: 2.1 years using 10 observations
- Aphelion: 128±18 AU (Note: Statistics of small numbers and random observational errors cause the orbital elements to be very poorly constrained and the uncertainties are so large and non-linear that these error bars are not really meaningful and just show that the uncertainties are large.)
- Perihelion: 29.3±1.2 AU
- Semi-major axis: 78±11 AU
- Eccentricity: 0.63±0.07
- Orbital period (sidereal): 695±150 yr
- Mean anomaly: 66°±22°
- Mean motion: 0° 0^{m} 4.716^{s} / day
- Inclination: 10.99°±0.025° (Note: The orbital inclination is the easiest part of an orbit to determine.)
- Longitude of ascending node: 245.1°±0.06°
- Time of perihelion: ≈1888±15?
- Argument of perihelion: 17°±7°
- Neptune MOID: ≈0.5 AU (75 million km)

Physical characteristics
- Mean diameter: 213 km (estimate) (for a magnitude of 6.8 and an assumed albedo of 8%)
- Apparent magnitude: 26.2
- Absolute magnitude (H): 6.53

2015 TH_{367} is a trans-Neptunian object on the order of 200 kilometers (120 miles) in diameter. As of 2021 it is approximately 90 AU (13 billion km) from the Sun. At the time of its announcement in March 2018, it was the third most distant observed natural object in the Solar System, after Eris and 2014 UZ224. (Note: In March 2018, 2015 TH_{367} was outbound 89.2 AU from the Sun and 2014 UZ224 was inbound 90.9 AU from the Sun.)

At a visual apparent magnitude of 26.2, it is one of the faintest trans-Neptunian objects observed and only the largest telescopes in the world can observe it. Being so far from the Sun, 2015 TH_{367} moves very slowly among the background stars and has only been observed eight times over 355 days. It requires an observation arc of several years to refine the uncertainties in the approximately 700-year orbital period and determine whether it is currently near or at aphelion (farthest distance from the Sun). As of 2023 the nominal JPL Horizons solution has it coming to aphelion around the year 2238, whereas Project Pluto (which only fit 5 of the 8 observations) shows it reached aphelion around 2015.

== Discovery ==
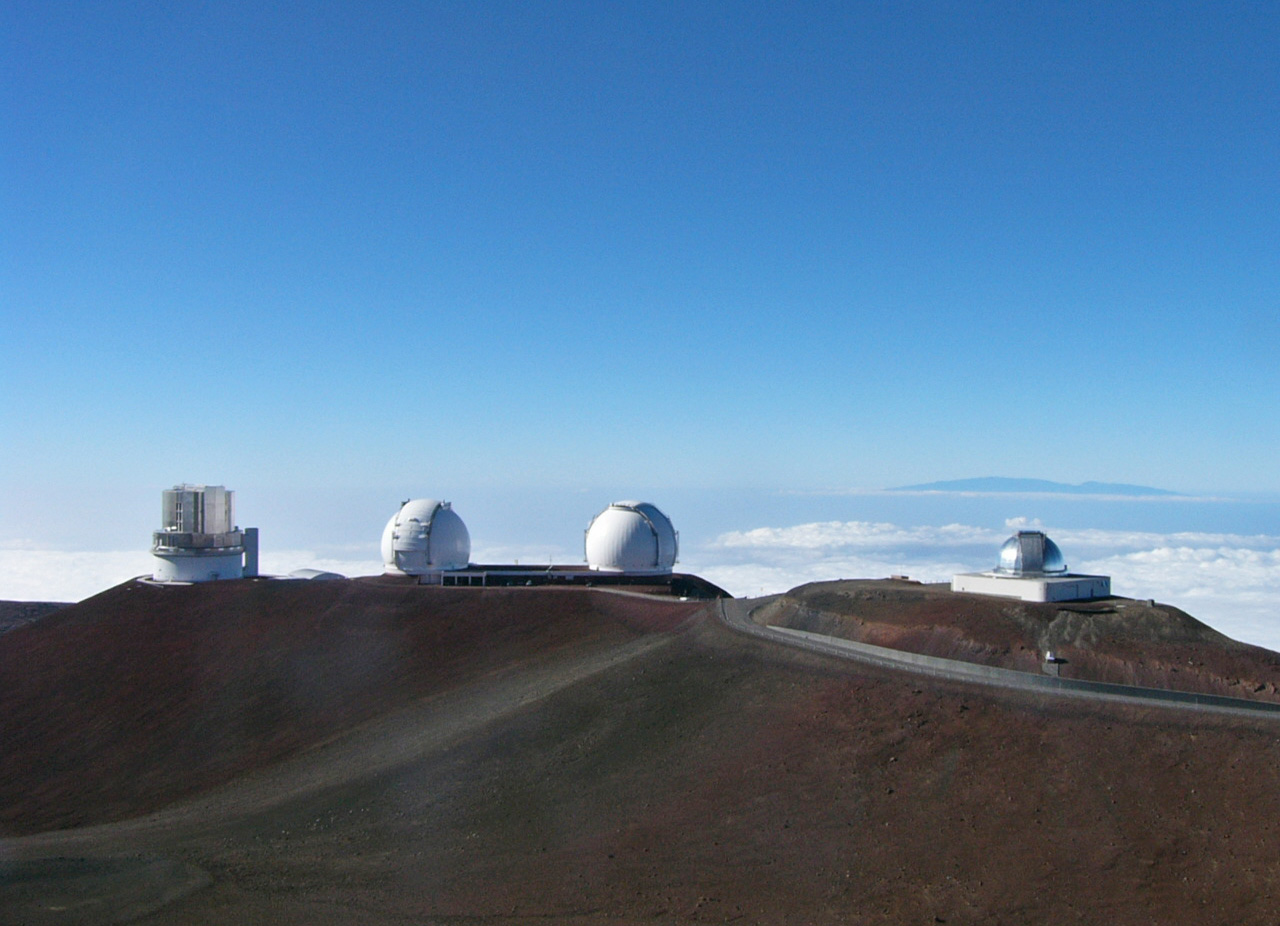
The object's discovery telescope, Subaru (Japanese name for the Pleiades) on the far left, alongside the twin Keck telescopes and NASA's Infrared Telescope Facility

2015 TH_{367} was first observed by Scott Sheppard, Chad Trujillo, and David Tholen on 13 October 2015 using the Subaru Telescope, a large reflecting telescope at the Mauna Kea Observatories on the summit of Mauna Kea with a primary mirror 8.2 meters (27 ft) in diameter. In 2015 it was only observed for 26 days, which is a very short observation arc for a trans-Neptunian object as objects far from the Sun move very slowly across the sky. It is calculated that it will remain in the constellation of Aries from 1994 until 2077. It was announced on 13 March 2018 alongside several other trans-Neptunian objects with a current heliocentric distance greater than 50 AU. The trans-Neptunian objects 541132 Leleākūhonua and 2015 TJ_{367} were also discovered by this team on 13 October 2015.

== Orbit ==
The orbit of 2015 TH_{367} is poorly constrained, as it has only been observed 10 times over 2 years due to how dim it is. At a visual apparent magnitude of 26.2, it is about 75 million times fainter than what can be seen with the naked eye, (Note: Math: $(\sqrt[5]{100})^{26.2-6.5}\approx$ 75,860,000) and it is one of the dimmest trans-Neptunian objects ever observed, only being able to be seen by the largest modern telescopes. The JPL Small-Body Database estimates that it came to perihelion (closest approach to the Sun) in the year 1888 and will reach aphelion (farthest distance from the Sun) at 128 AU in 2238. Project Pluto estimates perihelion was in 1886.

== Distance from the Sun ==
The precise distance of 2015 TH_{367} still remains unknown due to its poorly understood orbit and the fact it has not been observed since 2016. It is currently outbound roughly 90±4 AU from the Sun, and will require further observations to better refine the orbit. At magnitude 26, it is only observable with a small number of telescopes that are capable of following it up and refining its orbit. It was expected to come to opposition in the constellation of Aries around 3 November 2021 when it should have had a solar elongation of roughly 175°.

As of February 2021, there are only five known minor planets further from the Sun than 2015 TH_{367} under its nominal orbit: Eris (95.9 AU), 2020 FA31 (97.2 AU), 2020 FY30 (99.0 AU), 2018 VG18 (123.5 AU), and 2018 AG37 (~132 AU).

Observed Solar System objects that periodically become more distant than 89 AU from the Sun include Sedna (which is much larger in size), 2000 CR105, 2012 DR30, 2013 BL76, and 2005 VX3. There are 804 known objects that have aphelia more than 89 AU from the Sun as of March 2018. This distance is about double the outer limit of the torus-shaped Kuiper belt that lies outside Neptune's orbit. Far beyond this region is the vast spherical Oort cloud enshrouding the Solar System, whose presence was deduced from the orbits of long-period comets.

Study of the population of Solar System objects that are significantly more distant than 2015 TH_{367} will likely require new instruments. The proposed Whipple spacecraft mission is designed to determine the outer limit of the Kuiper belt and directly detect Oort cloud objects out to 10,000 AU. Such objects are too small to detect with current telescopes except during stellar occultations. The proposal involves use of a wide field of view and rapid recording cadence to allow detection of many such events.

== Confusion with 541132 Leleākūhonua ==
In November 2015, a reporter for Nature attended a meeting of the American Astronomical Society’s Division for Planetary Sciences where the Trujillo team announced the discovery of 2015 TH_{367} the previous month. Nature then issued a press release on the discovery of V774104, the internal designation of 2015 TH_{367}, as the most distant Solar System object ever observed, at around 103 AU. This press release received considerable media attention, but contained two errors, and because the Trujillo team had not themselves issued a press release or even submitted the discovery to the Minor Planet Center, there was no other public information. First, the object was not 2015 TH_{367} but another discovery from the same night's observation, the sednoid 2015 TG_{387}, now known as 541132 Leleākūhonua, that had also been announced at the meeting. Their internal designations had been conflated in the reporting. Second, the distance was significantly closer than 103 AU (and Leleākūhonua closer still), though it is not clear if this was misreporting or an inaccurate first estimate based on an extremely short observation arc.
