= 2013 AZ60 =

Small Solar System body

2013 AZ_{60}
Discovery
- Discovered by: Mt. Lemmon Survey
- Discovery date: 10 January 2013

Designations
- Minor planet category: trans-Neptunian object; centaur (DES); Oort cloud object

Orbital characteristics
- Epoch 4 September 2017 (JD 2458000.5)
- Uncertainty parameter 1
- Observation arc: 5.20 yr
- Aphelion: 1,116.9 AU (167.09 Tm) (Q)
- Perihelion: 7.920 AU (1.1848 Tm) (q)
- Semi-major axis: 562 AU (84.1 Tm) (a)
- Eccentricity: 0.98592 (e)
- Orbital period (sidereal): 13339 yr
- Mean anomaly: 0.07458° (M)
- Mean motion: 0.000050074°/day (n)
- Inclination: 16.532° (i)
- Longitude of ascending node: 349.20° (Ω)
- Argument of perihelion: 158.42° (ω)
- Known satellites: 0
- Jupiter MOID: 2.58 AU (386 Gm)
- Saturn MOID: 1.20 AU (180 Gm)

Physical characteristics
- Dimensions: ~40 km; 62.3±5.3 km
- Sidereal rotation period: 9.39±0.22 h
- Geometric albedo: 0.029
- Apparent magnitude: 19.8
- Absolute magnitude (H): 10.2

2013 AZ_{60} is a small Solar System body (extended centaur) from the scattered disk or inner Oort cloud. 2013 AZ_{60} has the 8th-largest semi-major axis of a minor planet not detected outgassing like a comet (2013 BL76, 2005 VX3 and 2012 DR30 have a larger semi-major axis).

2013 AZ_{60} came to perihelion in November 2014 at a distance of 7.9 AU from the Sun (inside of the orbit of Saturn). With an absolute magnitude (H) of 10.2, 2013 AZ_{60} has an estimated diameter of 40 km. Comet Hale–Bopp, which is roughly the same size, was not discovered until it was 7.2 AU from the Sun and had started outgassing CO. 2013 AZ_{60} may be discovered to be cometary as it comes to perihelion. It comes to opposition at the start of April.

After leaving the planetary region of the Solar System, 2013 AZ_{60} will have a barycentric aphelion of 827 AU with an orbital period of 8500 years. In a 10 million year integration of the orbit, one of the 3-sigma clones is ejected from the Solar System.

Orbital evolution
Epoch	Barycentric Aphelion (Q) (AU)	Orbital period yr
1950	1261	16000
2050	827	8500

== Physical characteristics and orbit ==
A 2016 study found 2013 AZ_{60} to have a comet-like albedo of 2.9% (darker than any other known ejected centaur) and a color typical of D-type asteroids. It is unknown if it is a so-called "super comet" or an extinct comet, considering its large distance from the Sun. It was also determined that 2013 AZ_{60} has a diameter of 62.3±5.3 kilometers, larger than initially believed. A light curve analysis found it to have a rotation period of 9.39±0.22 hours, typical of asteroids its size. No significant satellites were detected.

It was also found that 2013 AZ_{60} is on an extremely unstable orbit, with a ~64% chance of being ejected from the Solar System in 1 million years, and a ~25% chance of being ejected in the next 500,000 years, as well as a 4.2% chance of its orbit venturing into the neighborhood of Earth.

== Comparison ==
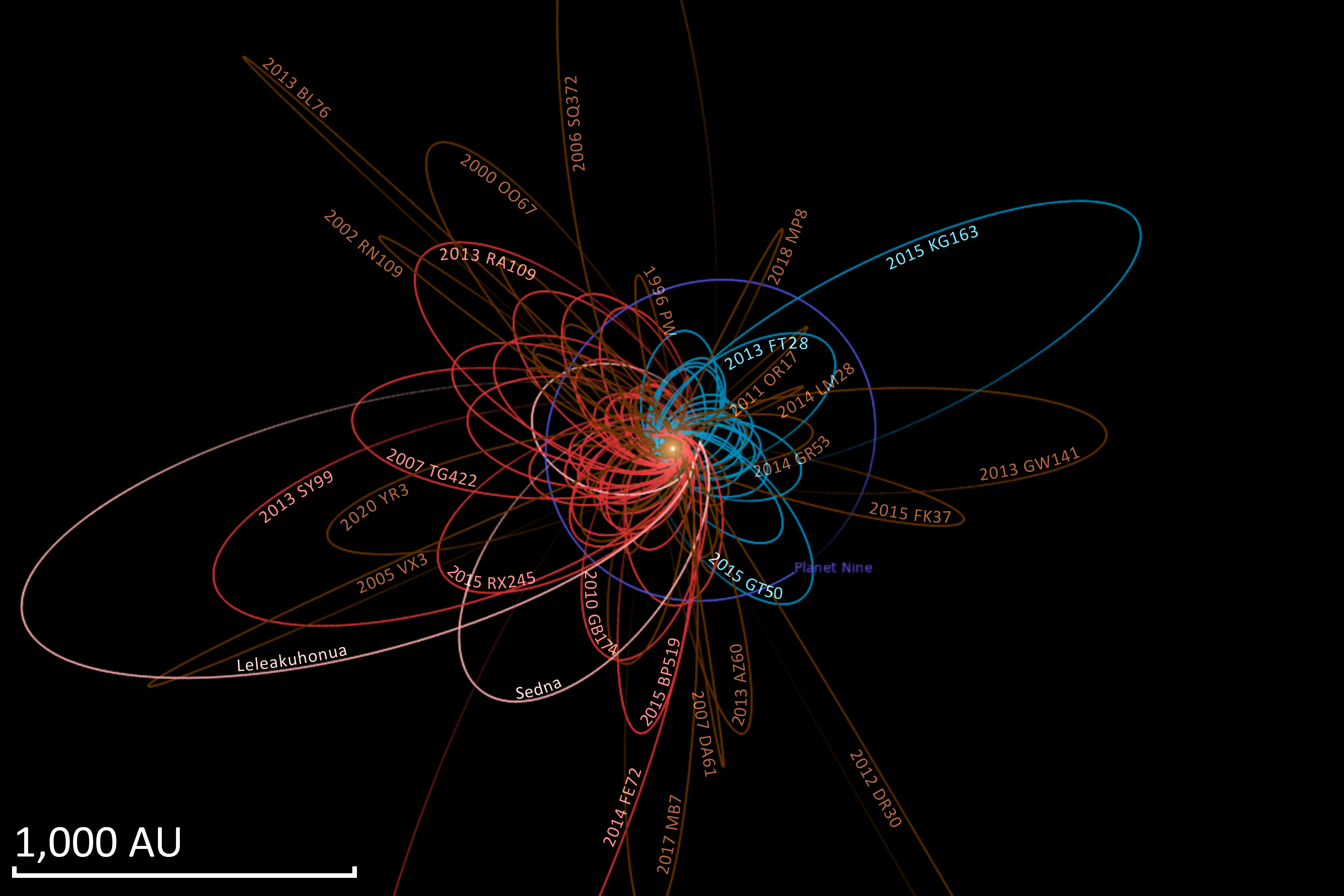
The orbits of Sedna, 2012 VP113, Leleākūhonua, and other very distant objects along with the predicted orbit of Planet Nine. The three sednoids (pink) along with the red-colored extreme trans-Neptunian object (eTNO) orbits are suspected to be aligned with the hypothetical Planet Nine while the blue-colored eTNO orbits are anti-aligned. The highly elongated orbits colored brown include centaurs and damocloids with large aphelion distances over 200 AU.

== See also ==
- 90377 Sedna (relatively large and also distant body)
- List of hyperbolic comets
- Pluto
- 2012 VP113
- List of Solar System objects by greatest aphelion

Have very large aphelion

- 2012 DR30 (14–2049 AU)
- 2005 VX3 (4–2049 AU)
- 2013 BL76 (8–1920 AU)
