= (709487) 2013 BL76 =

Trans-Neptunian object

(709487) 2013 BL_{76}
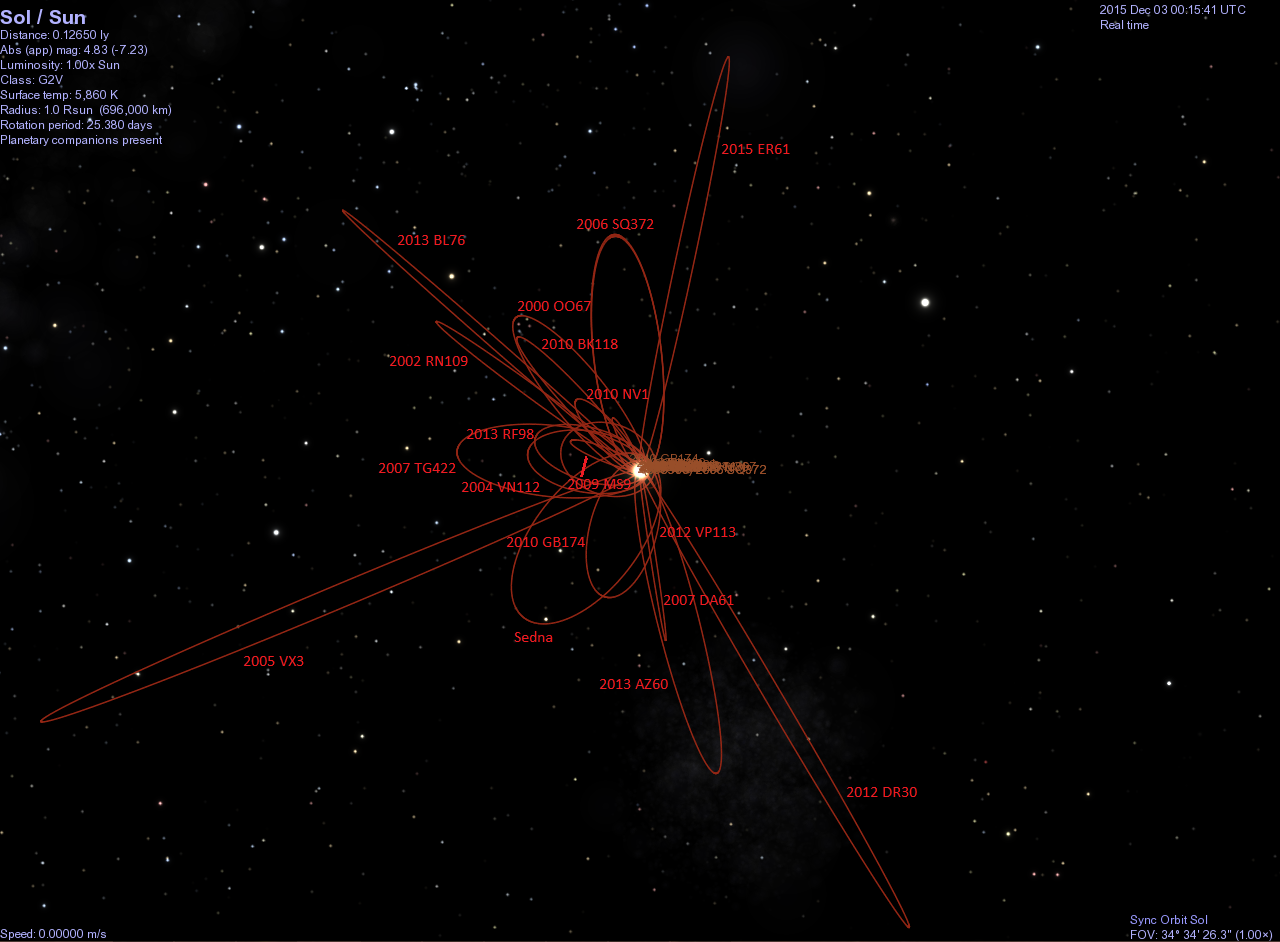
- The orbits of some of the most distant minor planets, 2013 BL_{76} at top left

Discovery
- Discovered by: Mt. Lemmon Survey
- Discovery date: 20 January 2013

Designations
- Minor planet category: TNO; Centaur (DES); damocloid; distant

Orbital characteristics
- Epoch 4 September 2017 (JD 2458000.5)
- Uncertainty parameter 1
- Observation arc: 1.88 yr (687 days)
- Aphelion: 2151.77 AU; ~1920 AU (Note: Given the orbital eccentricity of this object, different epochs can generate quite different heliocentric unperturbed two-body best-fit solutions to the semi-major axis and orbital period. For objects at such high eccentricity, the Sun's barycenter is more stable than a heliocentric solution. Using JPL Horizons, the barycentric semi-major axis is approximately 964 AU.)
- Perihelion: 8.3622 AU
- Semi-major axis: 1080.07 AU; ~964 AU
- Eccentricity: 0.9923
- Orbital period (sidereal): 35,496 yr (12,965,058 d); ~29900 yr; last perihelion: 2012-10-27
- Mean anomaly: 0.0493°
- Mean motion: 0° 0^{m} 0^{s} / day
- Inclination: 98.613°
- Longitude of ascending node: 180.20°
- Argument of perihelion: 165.96°

Physical characteristics
- Dimensions: ~15–40 km; 30–40 km (at 0.1–0.05)
- Apparent magnitude: 22.1
- Absolute magnitude (H): 10.8

(709487) 2013 BL_{76} is a trans-Neptunian object and centaur from the scattered disk and Inner Oort cloud approximately 30 kilometers in diameter.

Using an epoch of February 2017, it is the minor planet with the 5th largest heliocentric semi-major axis in the Solar System (larger ones include 2014 FE72, 2012 DR30, and 2005 VX3). 2013 BL_{76} has a barycentric semi-major axis of ~964 AU, which is the third largest barycentric semi-major axis of any minor planet.

== Possible comet ==
With an absolute magnitude (H) of 10.8 and an unknown albedo, the object has an estimated diameter of 15–40 km. Since it has not been seen out-gassing, it is not known if it is a comet or not. It might also be a damocloid, a type of minor planet that was originally a comet but lost most of its near-surface volatile materials after numerous orbits around the Sun. It also might be a dormant comet that simply has not been seen outgassing.

== Orbit ==
2013 BL_{76} came to perihelion 8.3 AU from the Sun on 27 October 2012, when it reached an apparent magnitude of about 20. In 1927, when it was 100 AU from the Sun, it had an apparent magnitude of about 30.8. For comparison, the dwarf planet Sedna had an apparent magnitude of 21.7 when it was 100 AU from the Sun. It comes to opposition at the start of September.

It will not be 50 AU from the Sun until 2045. After leaving the planetary region of the Solar System, 2013 BL_{76} will have a barycentric aphelion of 1920 AU with an orbital period of 29900 years.

The orbit of 2013 BL_{76} currently comes closer to Saturn than any of the other giant planets. In a 10 million year integration of the orbit, the nominal (best-fit) orbit acquires a perihelion point of 0.5 AU (inside the orbit of Venus), and one of the 3-sigma clones acquires a perihelion point of only 0.008 AU (1,200,000 km).

2013 BL_{76} travels in a technically retrograde orbit around the Sun. It is actually orbiting in a plane nearly perpendicular to that of the ecliptic. It has the 55th highest inclination of any known asteroid, after 2010 GW_{147} and before 2014 HS_{150}.

== Comparison ==
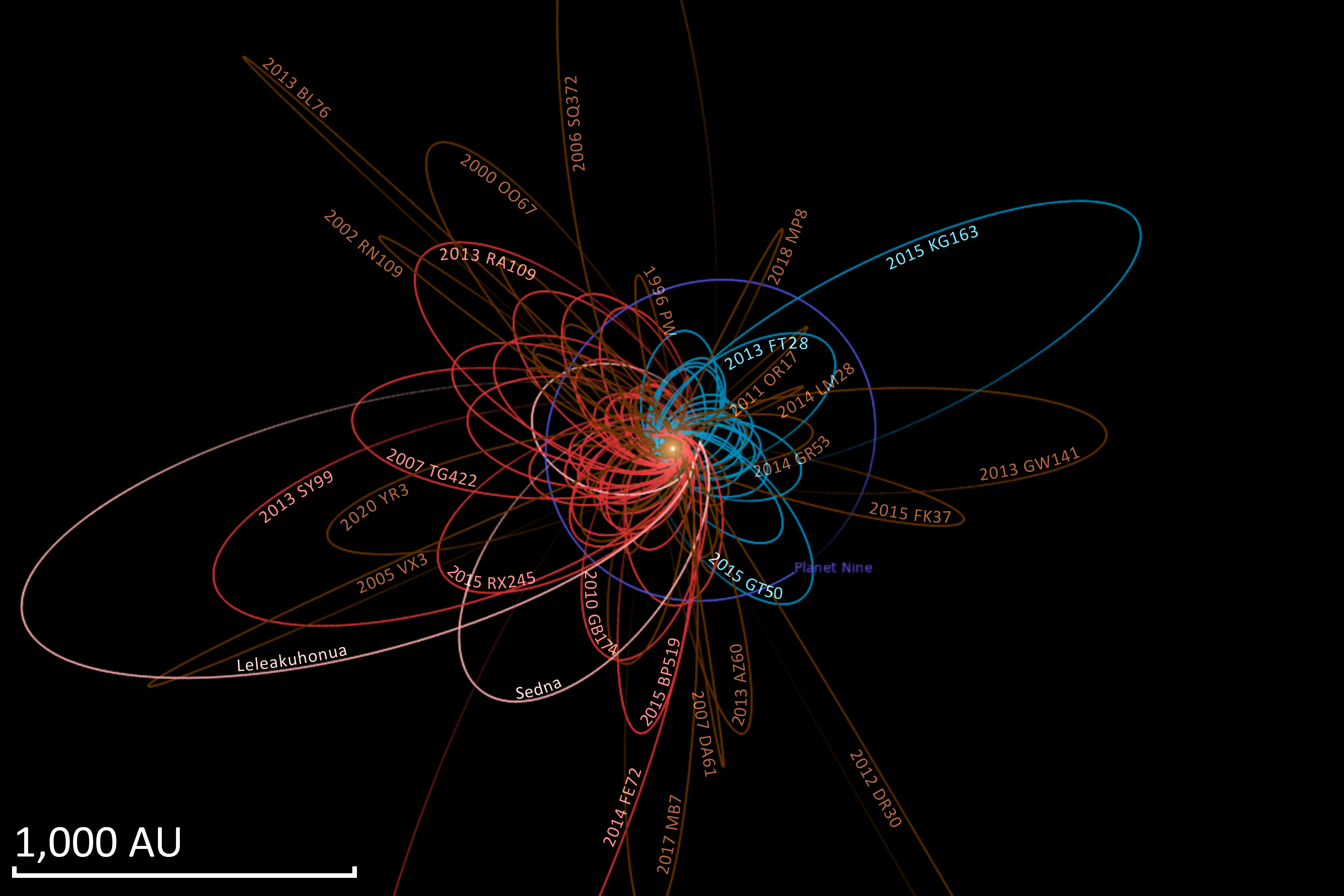
The orbits of Sedna, 2012 VP113, Leleākūhonua, and other very distant objects along with the predicted orbit of Planet Nine. The three sednoids (pink) along with the red-colored extreme trans-Neptunian object (eTNO) orbits are suspected to be aligned with the hypothetical Planet Nine while the blue-colored eTNO orbits are anti-aligned. The highly elongated orbits colored brown include centaurs and damocloids with large aphelion distances over 200 AU.

Orbital evolution
Epoch	Barycentric Aphelion (Q) (AU)	Orbital period yr
1950	1849	28300
2050	1920	29900

=== Largest semimajor axes of minor planets ===
Similar bodies
Minor planet desig.	Semi- major axis	Semi- major axis (bary)	Perihelion	Aphelion	Aphelion (bary)	Abs. mag. (H)	Diameter (km)	Orb. uncert. (0–9) (Note: 0–3 is high-certainty and well constrained, 9 is low-certainty and probably lost.)	No. obs. (arc days)
2002 GB32	213	206.7	35.3420	390	378	7.8; (7.7)	120	3	26 (4733)
(82158) 2001 FP185	220	216	34.2340	406	398	6.0	265	3	50 (2461)
2012 KA51	224	190	4.9	444	380	11.1	15	9	12 (6)
(148209) 2000 CR105	229.8	222.2	44.2000	415.5	400.4	6.3	320	3	54 (3242)
(468861) 2013 LU28	230	230	8.698	460	451.5	7.9	115	5	56 (385)
2006 UL321	261	257	23.5	498	490.5	7.6	125	9	3 (1)
2012 VP113	265	263.158	80.4500	448	445.88	4.0	460	5	26 (739)
1996 PW	267	240	2.5557	532	480	14.0	7	2	250 (506)
2011 OR17 (2010 KZ_{127})	272	270	3.0987	550	540	13.1	10	1	101 (748)
2013 RF98	320	316.7	36.288	603	597	8.6; (8.64±0.34175)	90	5	38 (56)
(336756) 2010 NV1	322.7	286	9.41587	635.9	562	10.6	34	1	147 (1815)
474640 Alicanto	328.8	327.3	47.3324	610.3	607.3	6.4	314	2	28 (3611)
(418993) 2009 MS9	349.55	352.5	11.00317	688.1	694	10.0; (9.9)	42	1	134 (1995)
2010 GB174	367	351.1	48.5600	686	653.7	6.5	223	3	18 (965)
2007 DA61	475	500	2.6550	950	900	15.1; (14.913±0.470)	4.5	4	78 (29)
2010 BK118	490	385	6.1050	980	770	10.2	38	1	292 (1319)
90377 Sedna	524.2	505.88	76.094	972.4	935.6	1.5	1000	2	90 (8819)
(523622) 2007 TG422	530	501.8	35.5830	1030	968	6.2	343	2	34 (1956)
(87269) 2000 OO67	570	555	20.7900	1100	1110	9.2	60	2	34 (2187)
2002 RN109	720	850	2.7040	1440	1201	15.3	4	3	38 (80)
(308933) 2006 SQ372	765	792	24.172	1500	1585	8.1	110	2	65 (1830)
2013 AZ60	880	593	7.908	1700	1176	10.2	62.3	1	189 (8067)
(709487) 2013 BL_{76}	1251	940	8.37358	2494	1825	10.8	35	1	68 (687)
(668643) 2012 DR30 (2009 FW_{54})	1300	1036	14.546	2600	2030	7.1	171	0	206 (5375)
2005 VX3	1300	1200	4.133	2700	2038	14.1	6	4	50 (81)
2014 FE72	2000	1500	36.3	4000	3000	6.0789±0.1699	226	5	12 (623)
