= (82158) 2001 FP185 =

Trans-Neptunian object

(82158) 2001 FP_{185}
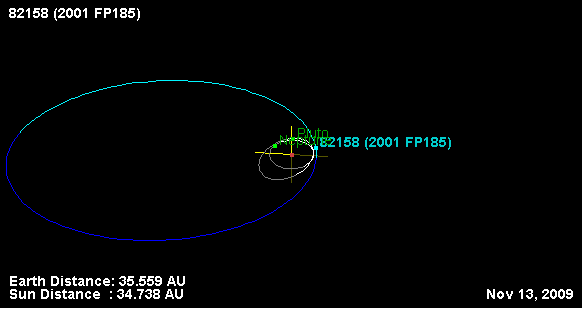

Discovery
- Discovered by: M. W. Buie
- Discovery site: Kitt Peak National Obs.
- Discovery date: 26 March 2001

Designations
- Minor planet category: TNO · SDO · distant

Orbital characteristics
- Epoch 4 September 2017 (JD 2458000.5)
- Uncertainty parameter 2
- Observation arc: 16.25 yr (5,937 days)
- Aphelion: 420.18 AU
- Perihelion: 34.280 AU
- Semi-major axis: 227.23 AU
- Eccentricity: 0.8491
- Orbital period (sidereal): 3425.31 yr (1,251,096 days)
- Mean anomaly: 1.4289°
- Mean motion: 0° 0^{m} 1.08^{s} / day
- Inclination: 30.763°
- Longitude of ascending node: 179.31°
- Argument of perihelion: 7.1638°
- Known satellites: 0

Physical characteristics
- Dimensions: 222.59 km (derived); 332±31 km 336 km (radiometric)
- Geometric albedo: 0.046±0.007; 0.05 (radiometric); 0.10 (assumed)
- Spectral type: Prominent water (H_{2}O/"bowl" type); IR · C B–R = 1.38; B–V = 0.860±0.040 · 0.820±0.048 · 0.820±0.020; V–R = 0.520±0.040 · 0.572±0.038 · 0.580±0.020; V–I = 1.070±0.060 · 1.013±0.072 · 1.060±0.010
- Absolute magnitude (H): 5.94±0.03 (R) · 5.940±0.053 (R) · 6.2 · 6.38 · 6.4

(82158) 2001 FP_{185} is a highly eccentric trans-Neptunian object from the scattered disc in the outermost part of the Solar System, approximately 330 kilometers in diameter. It was discovered on 26 March 2001, by American astronomer Marc Buie at Kitt Peak National Observatory in Arizona, United States.

== Orbit and classification ==
2001 FP_{185} is a scattered-disc object which belong to the most distant and coldest objects in the Solar System and are thought to be source of most periodic comets.

It orbits the Sun at a distance of 34.3–420.2 AU once every 3425 years and 4 months (1,251,096 days). Its orbit has an eccentricity of 0.85 and an inclination of 31° with respect to the ecliptic. A first precovery was taken by the Sloan Digital Sky Survey in March 1999, extending the body's observation arc by 2 years prior to its official discovery observation at Kitt Peak.

=== Planet Nine co-orbital ===
If a massive trans-Neptunian object exists, such as the hypothetical Planet Nine, 2001 FP_{185} may be co-orbital with it.

== Physical characteristics ==
=== Spectra and colors ===
2001 FP_{185}'s color has extensively been measured. The object has a determined BR and IR spectra, which are intermediate classes of the very blue BB and very red RR spectra.

=== Diameter and albedo ===
According to astronomer Michael Brown and based on radiometric observations, 2001 FP_{185} measures 336 kilometers in diameter and its surface has an (assumed) albedo of 0.05. Observations with the PACS-instrument of the Herschel Space Observatory during a survey of scattered-disc objects ("TNO are cool") found a similar diameter of 332 kilometer with an albedo of 0.046. The Collaborative Asteroid Lightcurve Link assumes a higher albedo of 0.10 and consequently derives a much shorter diameter of 222 kilometers based on an absolute magnitude of 6.38.

=== Lightcurve ===
No rotational lightcurve of 2001 FP_{185} has been obtained from photometric observations. The body's rotation period, pole axis and brightness amplitude remains unknown.

== Numbering and naming ==
This minor planet was numbered by the Minor Planet Center on 4 May 2004. As of 2025, it has not been named.

== See also ==
- List of Solar System objects by greatest aphelion
