= C/1999 F1 (Catalina) =

Oort cloud comet

Discovery
- Discovered by: Catalina Sky Survey 1.5-m reflector (703)
- Discovery date: March 23, 1999

Orbital characteristics
- Epoch: May 14, 2001 (JD 2452043.5)
- Observation arc: 6.46 years
- Number of observations: 166
- Orbit type: Oort cloud
- Aphelion: ~54,000 AU (inbound); ~66,000 AU (outbound)
- Perihelion: 5.787 AU (q) (outside of Jupiter's orbit)
- Eccentricity: 0.99914
- Orbital period: ~4 million yr (inbound); ~6 million yr (outbound)
- Inclination: 92.035°
- Last perihelion: February 13, 2002
- Jupiter MOID: 2.91 AU

C/1999 F1 (Catalina) is one of the longest known long-period comets. It was discovered on March 23, 1999, by the Catalina Sky Survey. The current perihelion point is outside of the inner Solar System which helps reduce planetary perturbations to this outer Oort cloud object and keep the inbound and outbound orbital periods similar.

The comet has an observation arc of 6 years allowing a good estimate of the inbound (original) and outbound (future) orbits. The orbit of a long-period comet is properly obtained when the osculating orbit is computed at an epoch after leaving the planetary region and is calculated with respect to the center of mass of the Solar System. C/1999 F1 made its closest approach to Neptune in August 2017. Using JPL Horizons, the barycentric orbital elements for epoch 2050-Jan-01 generate a semi-major axis of 33,000 AU, an aphelion distance of 66,000 AU (1 ly), and a period of approximately 6 million years. The large distance of the comet from Sun mean that galactic and stellar gravitational perturbations can change its orbit. The comet will pass 11,000 AU (0.17 ly) from Gliese 710. Smaller perturbations may be caused by approaching 1.78 parsec from HD 179939.

The generic JPL Small-Body Database browser uses a near-perihelion epoch of 2001-May-25 which is before the comet left the planetary region and makes the highly eccentric aphelion point inaccurate since it does not account for any planetary perturbations after that epoch. The heliocentric JPL Small-Body Database solution also does not account for the combined mass of the Sun+Jupiter.

There was potential for a close approach to Saturn when C/1999 F1 crossed the ecliptic plane in 1999, but Saturn was on the other side of its orbit.

C/1999 F1 and Minimum Orbit Intersection Distance (MOID) to the giant planets
Planet	MOID (AU)	Actual Approach Distance (AU)	Date of Closest Approach
Jupiter	2.914	7.68	2002-04-24
Saturn	0.159	10.1	2003-03-01
Uranus	2.944	7.70	2011-10-19
Neptune	10.11	22.1	2017-08-31

== See also ==
- List of Solar System objects by greatest aphelion
