= C/1992 J1 (Spacewatch) =

Non-periodic comet

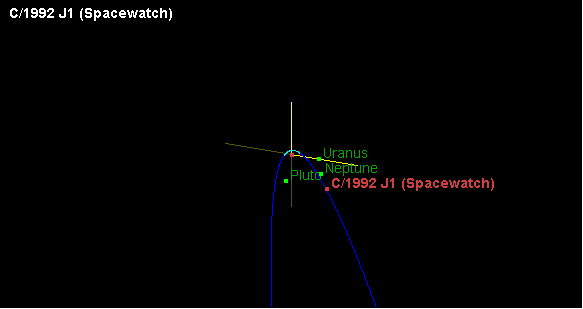
- Simulated orbit of C/1992 J1 (Spacewatch) as of 12 January 2012

Discovery
- Discovered by: David Rabinowitz; Spacewatch Project
- Discovery site: Kitt Peak Observatory
- Discovery date: 1 May 1992

Designations
- Alternative designations: 1992h 1993 XV

Orbital characteristics
- Epoch: 3 August 1993 (JD 2449202.5)
- Observation arc: 1,007 days (2.76 years)
- Number of observations: 240
- Aphelion: ~75,000 AU (inbound); ~3,700 AU (outbound)
- Perihelion: 3.007 AU
- Eccentricity: 0.99996
- Orbital period: ~78,000 years (outbound)
- Inclination: 124.32°
- Longitude of ascending node: 203.32°
- Argument of periapsis: 83.40°
- Last perihelion: 6 September 1993
- T_{Jupiter}: –1.212
- Earth MOID: 2.541 AU
- Jupiter MOID: 0.127 AU
- Comet total magnitude (M1): 8.3
- Comet nuclear magnitude (M2): 14.2

C/1992 J1 (Spacewatch) is a comet that was discovered 1 May 1992 by David Rabinowitz of the Spacewatch Project. This was the first comet to be discovered using an automated system.

== Orbit ==
Using a generic heliocentric (two-body) solution calculated near the time of perihelion (closest approach to the Sun), it is estimated to have an aphelion (Q) (furthest distance from the Sun) of 154,202 AU (2.43832 ly). But the orbit of a long-period comet is properly obtained when the osculating orbit is computed at an epoch after leaving the planetary region and is calculated with respect to the center of mass of the Solar System. After leaving the planetary region of the Solar System, the post-perihelion orbital period is estimated to be about 78,000 years with aphelion around 3,650 AU. In 2007 it reached more than 30 AU from the Sun.

== See also ==
- C/2007 N3 (Lulin), another comet with a near-parabolic orbit
- List of Solar System objects by greatest aphelion
