= 2013 FT28 =

Trans-Neptunian object

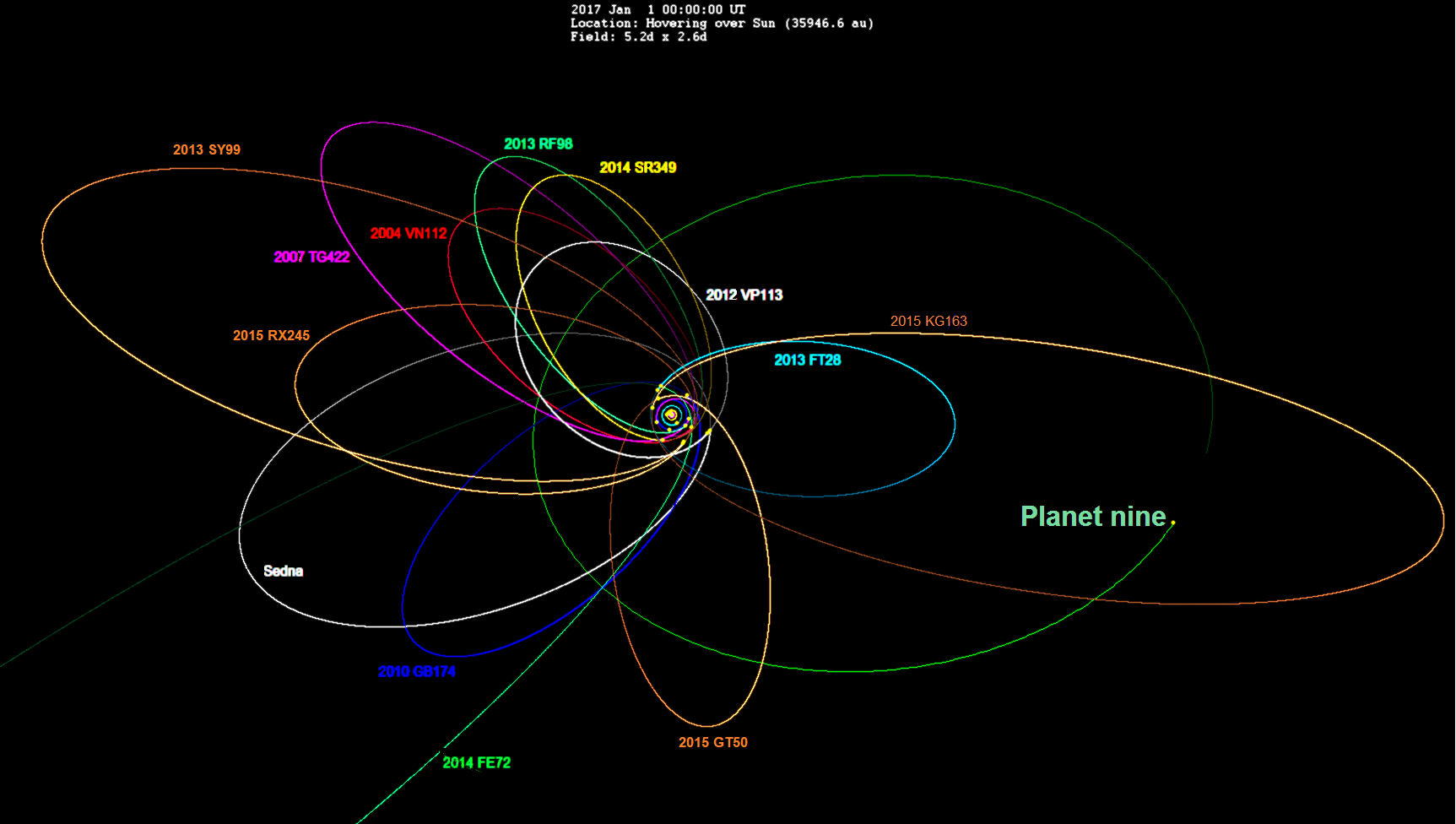
- The orbit of 2013 FT_{28} (right side in light blue, click image to enlarge) and other extreme detached objects, along with the hypothetical Planet Nine's orbit on the right

Discovery
- Discovered by: Scott S. Sheppard; Chad Trujillo
- Discovery date: 16 March 2013

Designations
- Designation: 2013 FT_{28}
- Minor planet category: TNO; E-SDO (detached object)

Orbital characteristics
- Epoch 31 July 2016 (JD 2457600.5)
- Uncertainty parameter 4
- Observation arc: 1089 days (2.98 yr)
- Aphelion: 546 AU (barycentric)
- Perihelion: 43.6 AU
- Semi-major axis: 296 AU (barycentric)
- Eccentricity: 0.86
- Orbital period (sidereal): 5051 yr (barycentric)
- Mean anomaly: 357.15°
- Inclination: 17.3°
- Longitude of ascending node: 217.7°
- Argument of perihelion: 40.2°

Physical characteristics
- Dimensions: 100–400 km
- Apparent magnitude: 24.3
- Absolute magnitude (H): 6.7

2013 FT_{28} is a trans-Neptunian object. It was discovered on 16 March 2013 at Cerro Tololo Observatory, La Serena and announced on 30 August 2016.

2013 FT_{28} is the first high semi-major axis, high perihelion extreme trans-Neptunian object that is anti-aligned with the other known extreme trans-Neptunian objects such as Sedna and 2012 VP113, i.e. its longitude of perihelion differs by 180° from other objects. The orbit of 2013 FT_{28} appears stable though simulations showed that it may have some resonant interaction with the known giant planets.

Its argument of perihelion is similar to that of another TNO, 2015 KG163.

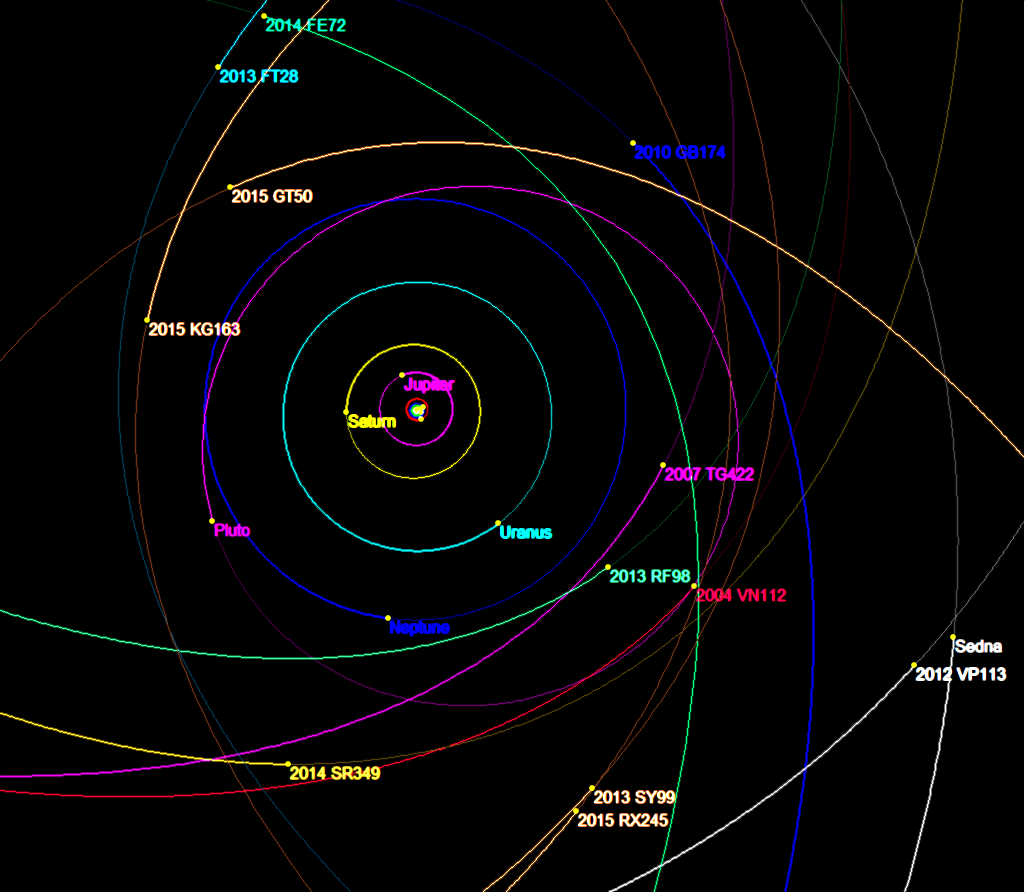
Closeup of current position near perihelion, passing downward from the upper left of this view
