= 2005 VX3 =

Trans-Neptunian object

2005 VX_{3}
Discovery
- Discovered by: Mount Lemmon Srvy.
- Discovery site: Mount Lemmon Obs. (first observed only)
- Discovery date: 1 November 2005

Designations
- Minor planet category: TNO · damocloid unusual · distant

Orbital characteristics
- Epoch 21 November 2025 (JD 2461000.5)
- Uncertainty parameter 4
- Observation arc: 81 days
- Aphelion: 2124.24 AU
- Perihelion: 4.1435 AU
- Semi-major axis: 1064.19 AU
- Eccentricity: 0.9961
- Orbital period (sidereal): 34,717 yr
- Mean anomaly: 0.2061°
- Mean motion: 0° 0^{m} 0.101^{s} / day
- Inclination: 112.69°
- Longitude of ascending node: 255.11°
- Argument of perihelion: 196.48°
- Jupiter MOID: 0.8405 AU
- T_{Jupiter}: −0.968

Physical characteristics
- Mean diameter: 7 km (est.)
- Geometric albedo: 0.09 (assumed)
- Absolute magnitude (H): 14.1

2005 VX_{3} is a trans-Neptunian object and retrograde damocloid on a highly eccentric, cometary-like orbit. It was first observed on 1 November 2005, by astronomers with the Mount Lemmon Survey at the Mount Lemmon Observatory in Arizona, United States. The unusual object measures approximately 7 kilometers (4 miles) in diameter. It has the 3rd largest known heliocentric semi-major axis and aphelion. Additionally its perihelion lies within the orbit of Jupiter, which means it also has the largest orbital eccentricity of any known minor planet.

== Description ==
2005 VX_{3} orbits the Sun at a distance of 4.1–2,124 AU once every 34,717 years (semi-major axis of 1,064 AU). Its orbit has an eccentricity of 0.9961 and an inclination of 113° with respect to the ecliptic. It belongs to the dynamical group of damocloids due to its retrograde orbit and its low Tisserand parameter (T_{Jupiter} of −0.968). It is a Jupiter-, Saturn-, Uranus-, and Neptune-crosser. The body's observation arc begins with its first observation by the Mount Lemmon Survey on 1 November 2005.

Orbital evolution — Barycentric elements
Year (epoch)	Aphelion	Semi-major axis	Ref
1950	2710 AU	n.a.	(Note: Given the orbital eccentricity of this object, different epochs can generate quite different heliocentric unperturbed two-body best-fit solutions to the semi-major axis and orbital period. For objects at such high eccentricity, the Sun's barycentric coordinates are more stable than heliocentric coordinates. Using JPL Horizons, the barycentric semi-major axis is approximately 1026 AU.)
2012	1914 AU	n.a.	(Note: Archived JPL Small-Body Database Browser: (2005 VX3) from 13 December 2012. JPL Epoch 2012 orbital solution that has aphelion (Q)=1914 AU.)
2015	2563 AU	n.a.	(Note: Archived MPC object data for (2005 VX3) from Minor Planet Center archive of Epoch 2015-06-27 with aphelion (Q) of 2563 AU.)
2016	3235 AU	n.a.	(Note: Archived MPC object data for (2005 VX3) from JPL Webcite archive of Epoch 2016-Jan-13 with aphelion (Q) of 3235AU.)
2050	2049 AU	1026 AU	

2005 VX_{3} has a barycentric semi-major axis of ~1026 AU. 2014 FE72 and (668643) 2012 DR30 have a larger barycentric semi-major axis. The epoch of January 2016 was when 2005 VX_{3} had its largest heliocentric semi-major axis.

The object has a short observation arc of 81 days and does not have a well constrained orbit. It has not been observed since January 2006, when it came to perihelion, 4.1 AU from the Sun. It may be a dormant comet that has not been seen outgassing. In the past it may have made closer approaches to the Sun that could have removed most near-surface volatiles. The current orbit crosses the ecliptic just inside Jupiter's orbit and has a Jupiter-MOID of 0.8 AU.

In 2017, it had an apparent magnitude of ~28 and was 24 AU from the Sun. It comes to opposition in mid-June. It would require one of the largest telescopes in the world for any more follow-up observations.

== Comparison ==
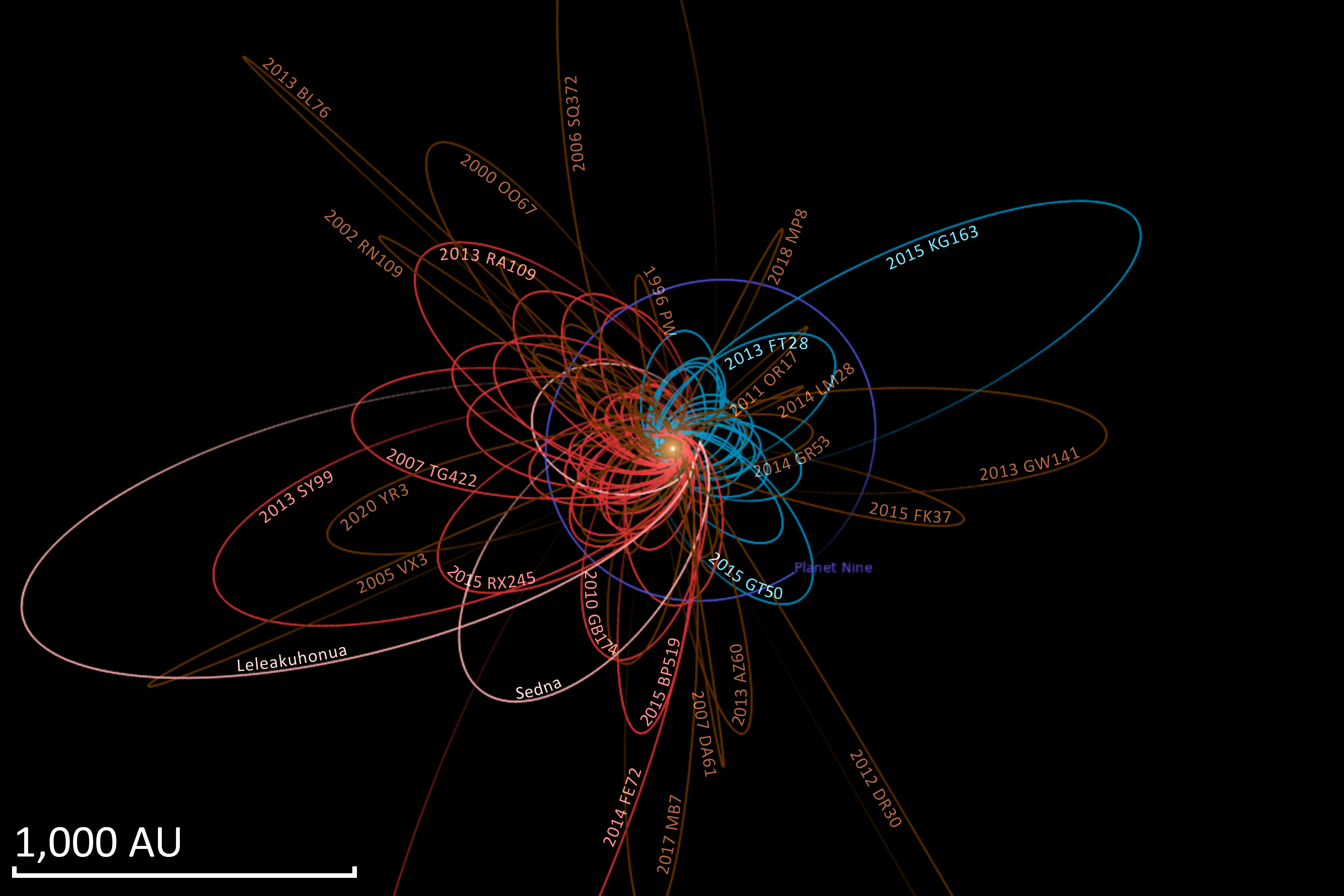
The orbits of Sedna, 2012 VP113, Leleākūhonua, and other very distant objects along with the predicted orbit of Planet Nine. The three sednoids (pink) along with the red-colored extreme trans-Neptunian object (eTNO) orbits are suspected to be aligned against the hypothetical Planet Nine while the blue-colored eTNO orbits are aligned. The highly elongated orbits colored brown include centaurs and damocloids with large aphelion distances over 200 AU.

== See also ==
- (709487) 2013 BL76
- (668643) 2012 DR30
- 2013 AZ60
- List of Solar System objects by greatest aphelion
