= (418993) 2009 MS9 =

Minor planet roughly 30–60 km in diameter

(418993) 2009 MS_{9}
Discovery
- Discovered by: Jean-Marc Petit; Brett Gladman; JJ Kavelaars
- Discovery site: Mauna Kea Observatory
- Discovery date: 25 June 2009

Designations
- Minor planet category: Centaur (DES)

Orbital characteristics
- Epoch 13 January 2016 (JD 2457400.5)
- Uncertainty parameter 2
- Observation arc: 2352 days (6.44 yr)
- Aphelion: 696 AU (barycentric 2050) (Note: Given the orbital eccentricity of this object, different epochs can generate quite different heliocentric unperturbed two-body best-fit solutions to the semi-major axis and orbital period. For objects at such high eccentricity, the Sun's barycentric coordinates are more stable than heliocentric coordinates. Using JPL Horizons, the barycentric semi-major axis is approximately 353 AU.); 684 AU
- Perihelion: 11.002 AU (1.6459 Tm)
- Semi-major axis: 353 AU (barycentric 2050); 347.6 AU
- Eccentricity: 0.96835
- Orbital period (sidereal): 6481.05 yr (2367202 d)
- Mean anomaly: 0.16189°
- Mean motion: 0° 0^{m} 0.547^{s} / day
- Inclination: 68.056°
- Longitude of ascending node: 220.226°
- Argument of perihelion: 128.675°

Physical characteristics
- Dimensions: 30–60 km
- Apparent magnitude: 21
- Absolute magnitude (H): 9.9

(418993) 2009 MS_{9} is a centaur roughly 30–60 km in diameter. It has a highly inclined orbit and a barycentric semi-major axis (average distance from the Sun) of ~353 AU.

2009 MS_{9} has a well determined orbit and has been assigned a minor planet number. Objects such 2009 MS_{9} may be the origin of Halley-type comets.

It came to perihelion in February 2013 at a distance of 11 AU from the Sun (outside the orbit of Saturn). As of 2016, it is 12 AU from the Sun.

It will not be 50 AU from the Sun until 2047. After leaving the planetary region of the Solar System, 2009 MS_{9} will have a barycentric aphelion of 696 AU with an orbital period of 6640 years.

In a 10 million year integration of the orbit, the nominal (best-fit) orbit and both 3-sigma clones remain outside 8.3AU (q_{min}) from the Sun.

Orbital evolution
| Epoch | Barycentric Aphelion (Q) (AU) | Orbital period yr |
| 1950 | 694 | 6610 |
| 2050 | 696 | 6640 |
