= 541132 Leleākūhonua =

Sednoid

- Leleākūhonua imaged by the Canada–France–Hawaii Telescope in July 2024

Discovery
- Discovered by: D. J. Tholen; C. Trujillo; S. S. Sheppard
- Discovery site: Mauna Kea Obs.
- Discovery date: 13 October 2015

Designations
- Pronunciation: English: /ˌlɛleɪɑːˌkuːhoʊˈnuːə/ Hawaiian: [lelejaːkuːhoˈnuwə]
- Alternative designations: 2015 TG_{387}; V302126 (internal designation); "The Goblin" (nickname)
- Minor planet category: TNO · sednoid

Orbital characteristics (barycentric)
- Epoch 25 February 2023 (JD 2460000.5)
- Uncertainty parameter 3
- Observation arc: 13.04 yr (4,763 d)
- Earliest precovery date: 5 October 2005
- Aphelion: 2714 AU
- Perihelion: 64.7 AU
- Semi-major axis: 1389 AU
- Eccentricity: 0.94572
- Orbital period (sidereal): 51787.68 yr
- Mean anomaly: 359.63°
- Mean motion: 0° 0^{m} 0.086^{s} / day
- Inclination: 11.68°
- Longitude of ascending node: 300.989°
- Time of perihelion: ≈ 11 June 2078 ±4.5 months
- Argument of perihelion: 118.236°
- Known satellites: 0

Physical characteristics
- Mean diameter: 220+28 −20 km
- Mean radius: 110+14 −10 km
- Geometric albedo: 0.21+0.03 −0.05
- Apparent magnitude: 24.5
- Absolute magnitude (H): 5.57±0.13

541132 Leleākūhonua (/ˌlɛleɪɑːˌkuːhoʊˈnuːə/; provisional designation 2015 TG_{387}) is an extreme trans-Neptunian object and sednoid in the outermost part of the Solar System. It was first observed on 13 October 2015, by astronomers at the Mauna Kea Observatories, Hawaii. Based on its discovery date near Halloween and the letters in its provisional designation 2015 TG_{387}, the object was informally nicknamed "The Goblin" by its discoverers and later named Leleākūhonua, comparing its orbit to the flight of the Pacific golden plover. It was the third sednoid discovered, after Sedna and 2012 VP113, and measures around 220 kilometers (140 miles) in diameter.

== Discovery ==
Leleākūhonua was first observed on 13 October 2015 at the Mauna Kea Observatory (T09), by American astronomers David Tholen, Chad Trujillo and Scott Sheppard during their astronomical survey for objects located beyond the Kuiper Cliff. The unofficial discovery was publicly announced on 1 October 2018. The survey uses two principal telescopes: For the Northern hemisphere, the 8.2-meter Subaru Telescope with its Hyper Suprime Camera at Mauna Kea Observatories, Hawaii, and for the Southern hemisphere, the 4-meter Blanco Telescope and its Dark Energy Camera at Cerro Tololo Inter-American Observatory in Chile. For follow-up observations to determine an object's orbit, the astronomers are using the Magellan and the Lowell Discovery telescopes. The survey's discoveries include 2012 VP113, 2014 SR349 and 2013 FT28.

== Orbit and classification ==
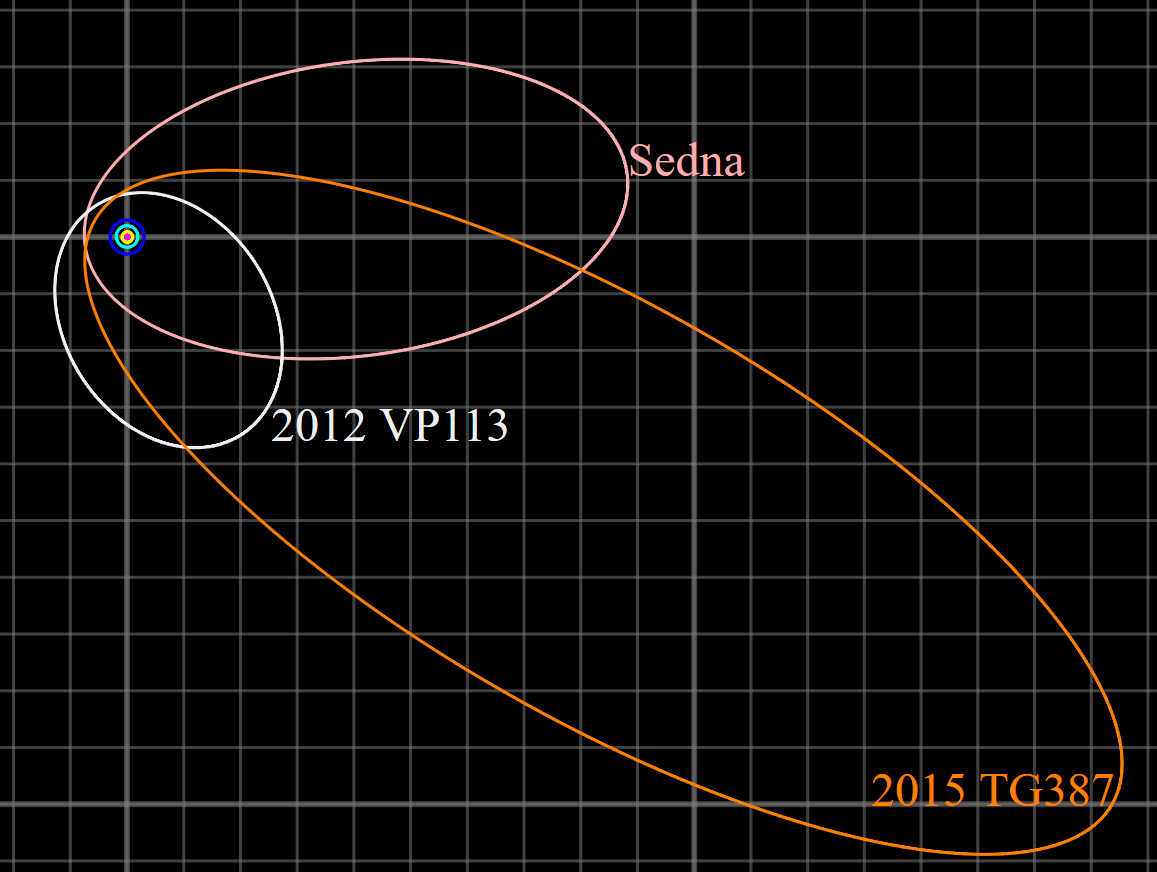
Orbital diagram of three of the four known sednoids: Leleākūhonua (2015 TG_{387}), Sedna and 2012 VP113

Leleākūhonua orbits the Sun at a distance varying from 65 to about 2800 AU once roughly every 55,000 years (semi-major axis of around 1450 AU). Its orbit has a very high eccentricity of 0.955 and an inclination of 12° with respect to the ecliptic. It belongs to the extreme trans-Neptunian objects defined by their large semi-major axis and is the third sednoid ever to be discovered, after Sedna and 2012 VP113 ("Biden").

=== Implications of orbit ===
Along with the similar orbits of other distant trans-Neptunian objects, the orbit of Leleākūhonua suggests, but does not prove, the existence of Planet Nine in the outer Solar System.

As of 2019, the object is inbound 78 AU from the Sun; about two-and-a-half times farther out than Pluto's current location. It will come to perihelion (closest approach to the Sun) in 2078. As with Sedna, it would not have been found had it not been on the inner leg of its long orbit. This suggests that there may be many similar objects, most too distant to be detected by contemporary technological methods. Following the discovery of Leleākūhonua, Sheppard et al. concluded that it implies a population of about 2 million inner Oort cloud objects larger than 40 km (25 mi), with a combined total mass of 1×10^{22} kg, about the mass of Pluto (a fraction the mass of Earth's moon but several times the mass of the asteroid belt).

== Numbering and naming ==
This minor planet was numbered by the Minor Planet Center on 10 October 2019 (M.P.C. 117077). On 3 June 2020, it was formally named Leleākūhonua, meaning 'it flies until land appears' (lele 'to fly' + ā 'until' + kū 'to appear' + honua 'land'). The name was suggested by students in the Hawaiian-language program A Hua He Inoa. The object reminded students of the migrations of the kolea, or Pacific golden plover, which migrates from Alaska to Hawaii. The English description states that the name "compares the orbit to the flight of migratory birds and evokes a yearning to be near Earth" (in Hawaiian, me he manu i ke ala pōʻaiapuni lā, he paʻa mau nō ia i ka hui me kona pūnana i kumu mai ai – 'like a bird on a path circling the sun, it is forever seeking a leeward wind back toward home').

== Physical characteristics ==
The size of Leleākūhonua depends on the assumed albedo (reflectivity); if it is a darker object then it would also have to be larger; a higher albedo would demand that it be smaller. The faint object has a visual magnitude of 24.64, comparable to the visual magnitudes of Pluto's smaller moons. It was initially estimated to be 300 km (190 mi) in diameter under the assumption of an albedo of 0.15, though observations of a single-chord stellar occultation at Penticton, Canada, on 20 October 2018 suggested a smaller diameter of 220 km (140 mi), corresponding to a higher albedo of 0.21.

== Visualizations ==
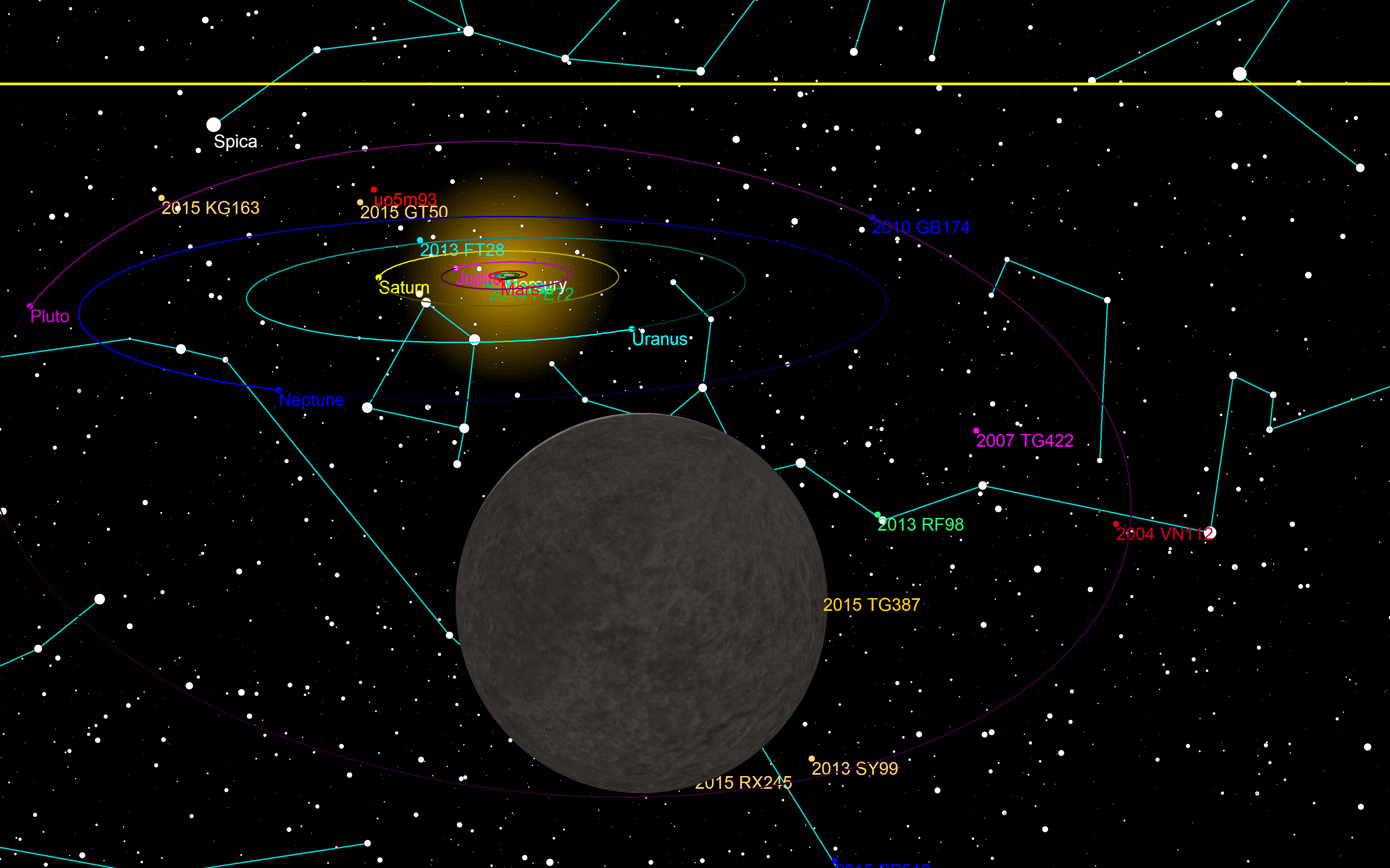
Simulated view of Solar System as seen from Leleākūhonua, showing the orbits of major planets and positions of other extreme trans-Neptunian objects

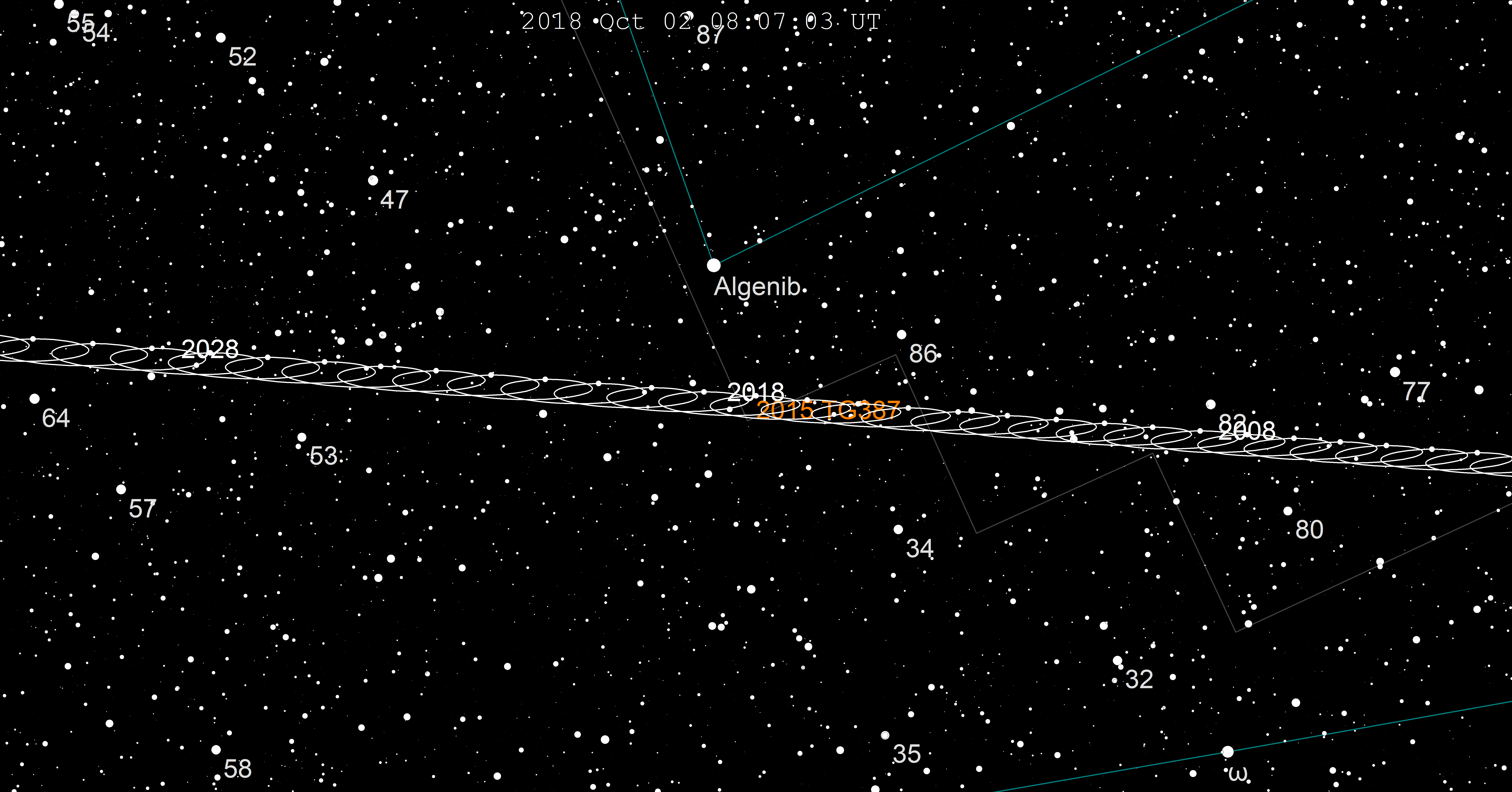
View of Leleākūhonua from Earth (in its 2018 position near γ Pegasi), showing retrograde loops every year

== See also ==
- List of Solar System objects most distant from the Sun
- List of Solar System objects by greatest aphelion
- V774104
