= (668643) 2012 DR30 =

Trans-Neptunian object and centaur

(668643) 2012 DR_{30}
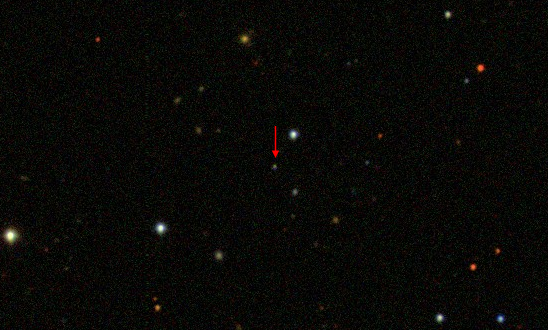
- 2012 DR_{30} in a precovery image taken by the Sloan Digital Sky Survey in 2000

Discovery
- Discovered by: PMO NEO Survey Program
- Discovery site: Purple Mountain Obs.
- Discovery date: 6 February 2008

Designations
- Alternative designations: 2009 FW_{54}
- Minor planet category: TNO; centaur; damocloid; distant

Orbital characteristics (Note: Given the orbital eccentricity of this object, different epochs can generate quite different heliocentric unperturbed two-body best-fit solutions to the semi-major axis and orbital period. For objects at such high eccentricity, the Sun's barycenter is more stable than heliocentric coordinates. Using JPL Horizons, the barycentric semi-major axis is approximately 1032 AU.)
- Epoch 27 April 2019 (JD 2458600.5)
- Uncertainty parameter 1
- Observation arc: 14.72 yr (5,375 d)
- Aphelion: 3192 AU; 2049 AU (barycentric)
- Perihelion: 14.5 AU
- Semi-major axis: 1603.44 AU; 1032 AU (barycentric)
- Eccentricity: 0.9909
- Orbital period (sidereal): 64207 yr 33100 yr (barycentric)
- Mean anomaly: 0.0453°
- Mean motion: 0° 0^{m} 0^{s} / day
- Inclination: 77.986°
- Longitude of ascending node: 341.48°
- Time of perihelion: ≈ 16 March 2011
- Argument of perihelion: 195.57°
- Jupiter MOID: 9.311 AU
- Saturn MOID: 5.45 AU
- Uranus MOID: 3.32 AU
- T_{Jupiter}: 0.9860

Physical characteristics
- Mean diameter: 185 km; 188 km
- Geometric albedo: 0.076; 0.08 (approx.)
- Spectral type: Prominent water (H_{2}O/"bowl" type); BR–IR; B–R = 1.21
- Apparent magnitude: 19.9
- Absolute magnitude (H): 7.1

(668643) 2012 DR_{30} is a trans-Neptunian object and centaur with an extremely eccentric orbit that brings it from the inner Oort cloud, the outermost region of the Solar System. It was discovered on 6 February 2008 by astronomers at Purple Mountain Observatory in Nanking, China. It measures approximately 188 kilometers (120 miles) in diameter.

== Description ==
Using an epoch of February 2017, it has the second-largest heliocentric semi-major axis of a minor planet not detected outgassing like a comet. (2014 FE72 has a larger heliocentric semi-major axis.) 2012 DR_{30} does have a barycentric semi-major axis of 1032 AU. For the epoch of July 2018 2012 DR_{30} will have its largest heliocentric semi-major axis of 1644 AU.

Orbital evolution
Year (epoch)	Barycentric Aphelion (Q) (AU)	Orbital period years
1950	2000	32000
2050	2049	33100

2012 DR_{30} passed 5.7 AU from Saturn in February 2009 and came to perihelion in March 2011 at a distance of 14.5 AU from the Sun (inside the orbit of Uranus). In 2018, it will move from 18.2 AU to 19.1 AU from the Sun. It comes to opposition in late March. With an absolute magnitude (H) of 7.1, the object has a published diameter of 185 and 188 kilometers, respectively.

With an observation arc of 14.7 years, it has a well constrained orbit. It will not be 50 AU from the Sun until 2047. After leaving the planetary region of the Solar System, 2012 DR_{30} will have a barycentric aphelion of 2049 AU with an orbital period of 33100 years. In a 10 million year integration of the orbit, the nominal (best-fit) orbit and both 3-sigma clones remain outside 12.2 AU (q_{min}) from the Sun. Summary of barycentric orbital parameters are:

- Semi-major axis: ~1032 AU
- aphelion: ~2049 AU
- period: ~33,100 yr

Archived data from the JPL SBDB and MPC. (Note: Archived JPL Small-Body Database Browser: (2012 DR30) from 15 October 2014.) (Note: Archived MPC object data for 2012 DR30 (2009 FW54) from 12 July 2013.)

== Comparison ==
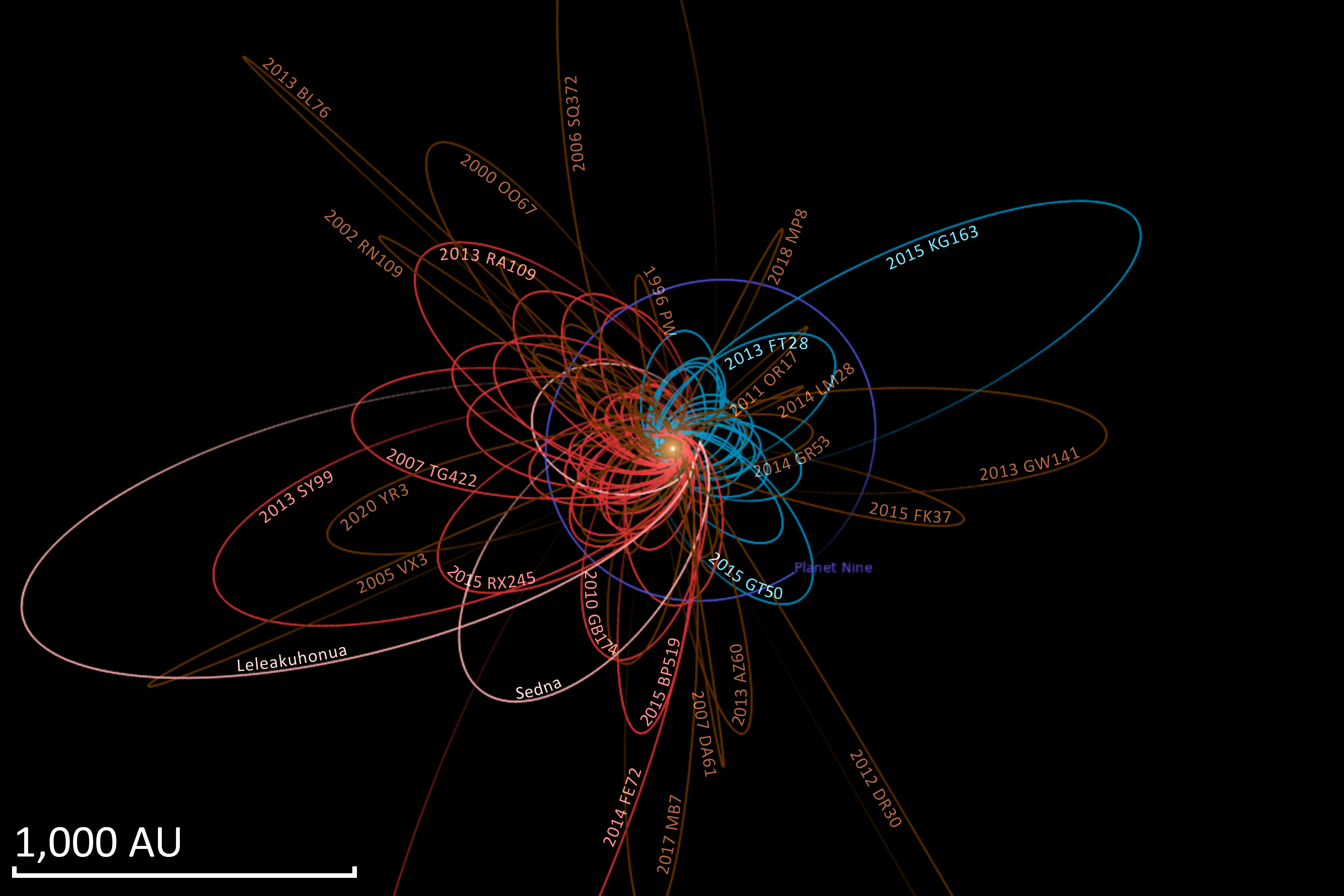
The orbits of Sedna, 2012 VP113, Leleākūhonua, and other very distant objects along with the predicted orbit of Planet Nine. The three sednoids (pink) along with the red-colored extreme trans-Neptunian object (eTNO) orbits are suspected to be aligned with the hypothetical Planet Nine while the blue-colored eTNO orbits are anti-aligned. The highly elongated orbits colored brown include centaurs and damocloids with large aphelion distances over 200 AU.

== See also ==
- 2005 VX3
- (308933) 2006 SQ372
- (523622) 2007 TG422
- 90377 Sedna
- List of hyperbolic comets
- Planet Nine
