= 2012 VP113 =

Sednoid

2012 VP_{113}
- 2012 VP_{113} imaged by the Canada–France–Hawaii Telescope on 9 October 2021

Discovery
- Discovered by: Scott S. Sheppard; Chadwick A. Trujillo
- Discovery site: Cerro Tololo Obs.
- Discovery date: 5 November 2012

Designations
- Alternative designations: "Biden" (nickname)
- Minor planet category: TNO; sednoid

Orbital characteristics (barycentric)
- Epoch 5 May 2025 (JD 2460800.5)
- Uncertainty parameter 3
- Observation arc: 16.94 yr (6,187 d)
- Earliest precovery date: 19 September 2007
- Aphelion: 444.1 AU
- Perihelion: 80.52 AU
- Semi-major axis: 262.3 AU
- Eccentricity: 0.6931
- Orbital period (sidereal): 4,246 yr
- Mean anomaly: 24.05°
- Mean motion: 0° 0^{m} 0.836^{s} / day
- Inclination: 24.0563°±0.006°
- Longitude of ascending node: 90.80°
- Time of perihelion: ≈ September 1979
- Argument of perihelion: 293.90°
- Known satellites: 0

Physical characteristics
- Mean diameter: 450 km (for an assumed albedo of 0.15)
- Mass: 7.047196×10^{19} kg (est.)
- Spectral type: moderately red; B−R = 1.44±0.05; V−R = 0.52±0.04; R−I = 0.53±0.04; r-i = 0.188±0.072; r-z = 0.223±0.144; i-z = 0.035±0.137
- Apparent magnitude: 23.5
- Absolute magnitude (H): 4.05

2012 VP_{113} is a trans-Neptunian object (TNO) orbiting the Sun on an extremely distant and markedly elliptical orbit. It is classified as a sednoid because its orbit never comes closer than 80.5 AU (12.04 billion km; 7.48 billion mi) from the Sun, which is far enough away from the giant planets that their gravitational influence cannot affect the object's orbit noticeably. It was discovered on 5 November 2012 at Cerro Tololo Inter-American Observatory in Chile, by American astronomers Scott Sheppard and Chad Trujillo, who nicknamed the object "Biden" after the "VP" in its designation. The discovery was announced on 26 March 2014. The object's size has not been measured, but its brightness suggests that it is around 450 km (280 mi) in diameter. 2012 VP_{113} has a reddish color similar to many other TNOs.

2012 VP_{113} has not yet been imaged by high-resolution telescopes, so it has no known moons. The Hubble Space Telescope is planned to image 2012 VP_{113} in 2026, which should determine if it has significantly sized moons.

== History ==
=== Discovery ===
Discovery images of 2012 VP_{113} taken on 5 November 2012.

2012 VP_{113} was first reported to have been observed on 5 November 2012 with NOAO's 4-meter Víctor M. Blanco Telescope at the Cerro Tololo Inter-American Observatory. Carnegie's 6.5-meter Magellan telescope at Las Campanas Observatory in Chile was used to determine its orbit and surface properties.

Before being announced to the public, 2012 VP_{113} was only tracked by Cerro Tololo Inter-American Observatory (807) and Las Campanas Observatory (304).

2012 VP_{113} has been found in precovery images as early as September 2007.

=== Nickname ===
2012 VP_{113} was abbreviated "VP" and nicknamed "Biden" by the discovery team, after Joe Biden who was then the vice president ("VP") of the United States.

== Physical characteristics ==
2012 VP_{113} has an absolute magnitude of 4.05, which means it may be large enough to be a dwarf planet. The diameter and geometric albedo of 2012 VP_{113} has not been measured yet. Under the assumption that 2012 VP_{113} has a moderate geometric albedo of 0.15 (typical of TNOs), its diameter would be around 450 km (280 mi). A wider range of albedos gives a possible diameter range of 300–1,000 km (190–620 mi). It is expected to be about half the size of Sedna and similar in size to Huya. Its surface is moderately red in color, resulting from chemical changes produced by the effect of radiation on frozen water, methane, and carbon dioxide. This optical color is consistent with formation in the gas-giant region and not the classical Kuiper belt, which is dominated by ultra-red colored objects. A 2021 study by Muñoz-Gutiérrez assumed a mass of 0.0118×10^{−3} 🜨 (7.047196×10^{19} kg) for 2012 VP_{113}. However, the true mass still remains unknown as it is not known to have a moon (which means there is currently no way to measure its mass and density).

== Orbit and classification ==
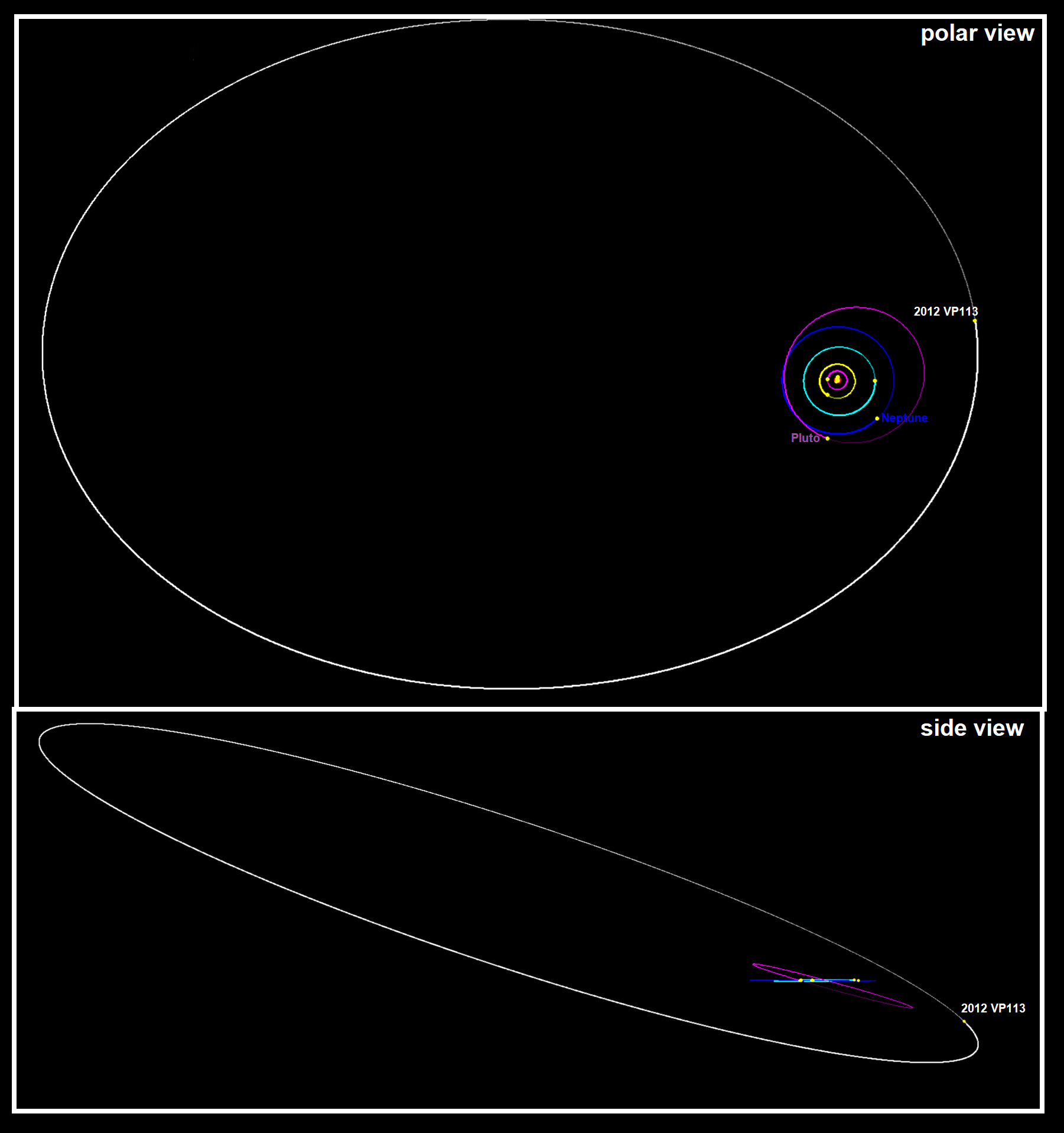
Orbital diagrams of 2012 VP_{113} with Pluto and the outer planets as of 2017

2012 VP_{113} has the farthest perihelion (closest approach to the Sun) of all known minor planets and all known objects in the Solar System as of 2025, greater than Sedna's. Though its perihelion is farther, 2012 VP_{113} has an aphelion only about half of Sedna's. It is the second discovered sednoid, with a semi-major axis beyond 150 AU and a perihelion greater than 50 AU. The similarity of the orbit of 2012 VP_{113} to other known extreme trans-Neptunian objects led Scott Sheppard and Chad Trujillo to suggest that an undiscovered object, Planet Nine, in the outer Solar System is shepherding these distant objects into similar type orbits.

Its last perihelion was within a couple months of September 1979. The paucity of bodies with perihelia at 50–75 AU appears not to be an observational artifact and is known as the Kuiper cliff.

2012 VP_{113} is possibly a member of a hypothesized Hills cloud. It has a perihelion, argument of perihelion, and current position in the sky similar to those of Sedna. In fact, all known Solar System bodies with semi-major axes over 150 AU and perihelia greater than Neptune's have arguments of perihelion clustered near 340°±55°. This could indicate a similar formation mechanism for these bodies. (148209) 2000 CR105 was the first such object to be discovered.

It is currently unknown how 2012 VP_{113} acquired a perihelion distance beyond the Kuiper belt. The characteristics of its orbit, like those of Sedna's, have been explained as possibly created by a passing star or a trans-Neptunian planet of several Earth masses hundreds of astronomical units from the Sun. The orbital architecture of the trans-Plutonian region may signal the presence of more than one planet. 2012 VP_{113} could even be captured from another planetary system. However, it is considered more likely that the perihelion of 2012 VP_{113} was raised by multiple interactions within the crowded confines of the open star cluster in which the Sun formed.

=== Orbital stability ===
A study by Muñoz-Gutiérrez et al. simulates the orbital stability of 34 dwarf planet candidates over 1 billon years (1 Gyr), and using nearly 100000 clones of the orbits, with 2012 VP_{113} being one of them. Over the 1 Gyr they simulated, they say it has a "Stable" orbit, with its diffusion time being 20006.962 Gyr, making its orbit "Very Stable". It is also the longest diffusion time they calculated.

=== Orbit diagrams ===
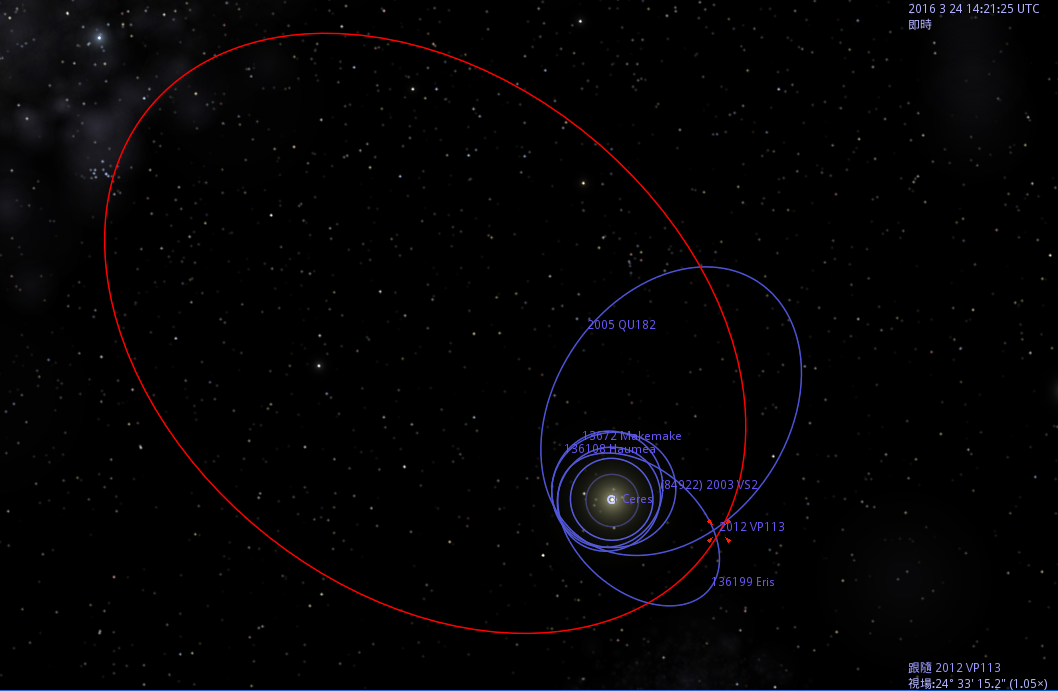
Simulated view showing the orbit of 2012 VP_{113}

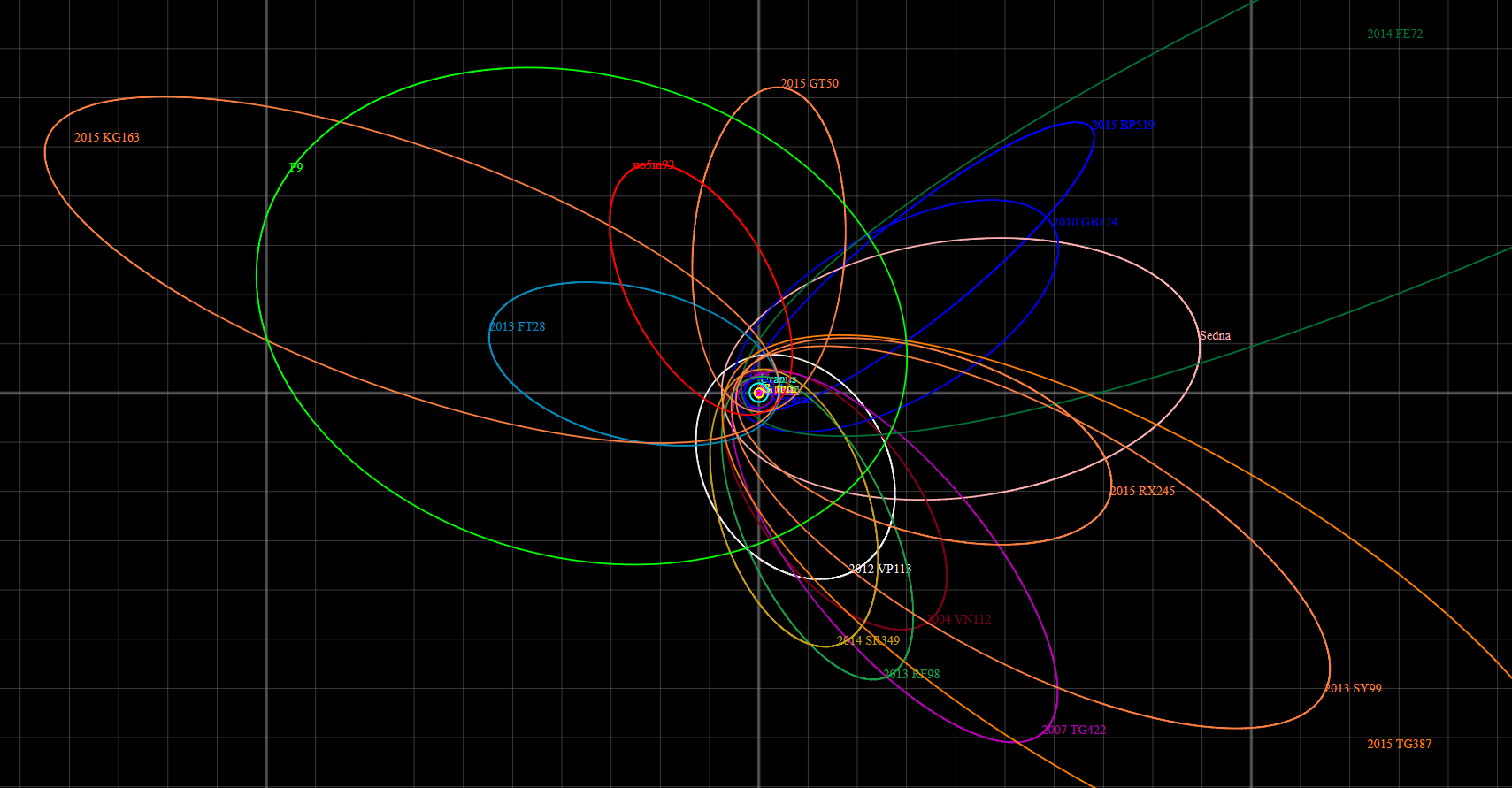
2012 VP_{113} orbit in white with hypothetical Planet Nine

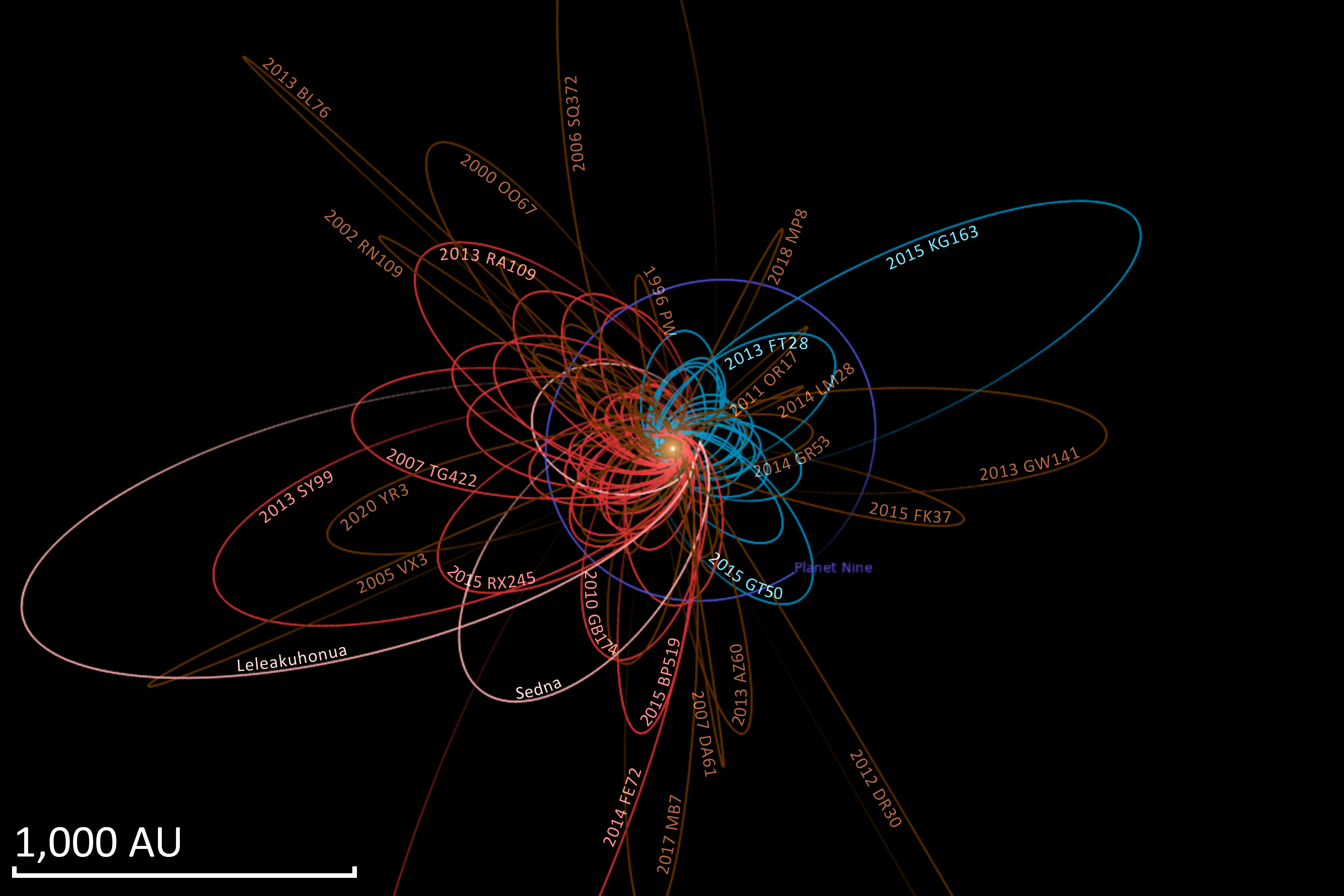
The orbits of known distant objects with large aphelion distances over 200 AU

== See also ==
- List of Solar System objects most distant from the Sun
- 90377 Sedna – first sednoid discovered
- 541132 Leleākūhonua – third sednoid discovered
- List of hyperbolic comets
- List of possible dwarf planets

Other large aphelion objects

- (668643) 2012 DR30 (15–2880 AU)
- 2005 VX3 (4–1630 AU)
- (709487) 2013 BL76 (8–1870 AU)
- 2014 FE72 (36–2680 AU)
