= Detached object =

Dynamical class of minor planets

Trans-Neptunian objects plotted by their distance and inclination. Objects beyond a distance of 100 AU display their designation. Resonant TNO (incl. Plutino) Cubewanos (classical KBO) Scattered disc object Detached object

Detached objects are a dynamical class of minor planets in the outer reaches of the Solar System and belong to the broader family of trans-Neptunian objects (TNOs). These objects have orbits whose points of closest approach to the Sun (perihelion) are sufficiently distant from the gravitational influence of Neptune that they are only moderately affected by Neptune and the other known planets: This makes them appear to be "detached" from the rest of the Solar System, except for their attraction to the Sun.

In this way, detached objects differ substantially from most other known TNOs, which form a loosely defined set of populations that have been perturbed to varying degrees onto their current orbit by gravitational encounters with the giant planets, predominantly Neptune. Detached objects have larger perihelia than these other TNO populations, including the objects in orbital resonance with Neptune, such as Pluto, the classical Kuiper belt objects in non-resonant orbits such as Makemake, and the scattered disk objects like Eris.

Detached objects have also been referred to in the scientific literature as extended scattered disc objects (E-SDO), distant detached objects (DDO), or scattered–extended, as in the formal classification by the Deep Ecliptic Survey. This reflects the dynamical gradation that can exist between the orbital parameters of the scattered disk and the detached population.

At least nine such bodies have been securely identified, of which the largest, most distant, and best known is Sedna. Those with large semi-major axes and high perihelion orbits similar to that of Sedna are termed sednoids. As of 2025, there are four known sednoids, including 2012 VP113, Leleākūhonua, and 2023 KQ14. These objects exhibit a highly statistically significant asymmetry between the distributions of object pairs with small ascending and descending nodal distances that might be indicative of a response to external perturbations; asymmetries such as this one are sometimes attributed to perturbations induced by unseen planets.

== Orbits ==
Detached objects have perihelia much larger than Neptune's aphelion. They often have highly elliptical, very large orbits with semi-major axes of up to a few hundred astronomical units (AU, the radius of Earth's orbit). Such orbits cannot have been created by gravitational scattering by the giant planets, not even Neptune. Instead, a number of explanations have been put forward, including an encounter with a passing star or a distant planet-sized object, or Neptune migration (which may once have had a much more eccentric orbit, from which it could have tugged the objects to their current orbit) or ejected rogue planets (present in the early Solar System that were ejected).

The classification suggested by the Deep Ecliptic Survey team introduces a formal distinction between scattered-near objects (which could be scattered by Neptune) and scattered-extended objects (e.g. 90377 Sedna) using a Tisserand's parameter value of 3.

The Planet Nine hypothesis suggests that the orbits of several detached objects can be explained by the gravitational influence of a large, unobserved planet between 200 AU and 1200 AU from the Sun and/or the influence of Neptune.

== Classification ==
Detached objects are one of four distinct dynamical classes of TNO; the other three classes are classical Kuiper-belt objects, resonant objects, and scattered-disc objects (SDO). Sednoids also belong to detached objects. Detached objects generally have a perihelion distance greater than 40 AU, deterring strong interactions with Neptune, which has an approximately circular orbit about 30 AU from the Sun. The boundary between the scattered and detached regions can be defined using an analytical resonance overlap criterion.

The discovery of 90377 Sedna in 2003, together with a few other objects discovered around that time such as (148209) 2000 CR105 and (612911) 2004 XR190, has motivated discussion of a category of distant objects that may also be inner Oort cloud objects or (more likely) transitional objects between the scattered disc and the inner Oort cloud.

Although Sedna is officially considered a scattered-disc object by the MPC, its discoverer Michael E. Brown has suggested that because its perihelion distance of 76 AU is too distant to be affected by the gravitational attraction of the outer planets it should be considered an inner-Oort-cloud object rather than a member of the scattered disc. This classification of Sedna as a detached object is accepted in recent publications.

This line of thinking suggests that the lack of a significant gravitational interaction with the outer planets creates an extended–outer group starting somewhere between Sedna (perihelion 76 AU) and more conventional SDOs like (15874) 1996 TL66 (perihelion 35 AU), which is listed as a scattered–near object by the Deep Ecliptic Survey.

=== Influence of Neptune ===
One of the problems with defining this extended category is that weak resonances may exist and would be difficult to prove due to chaotic planetary perturbations and the current lack of knowledge of the orbits of these distant objects. They have orbital periods of more than 300 years but most have only been observed over an observation arc of less than a decade. Due to their great distance and slow movement against background stars, it may be decades before most of these distant orbits can be determined well enough to confidently confirm or rule out a resonance. Further improvement in the orbit and potential resonance of these objects will help to understand the migration of the giant planets and the formation of the Solar System. For example, simulations by Emelʹyanenko and Kiseleva in 2007 show that many distant objects could be in resonance with Neptune. They show a 10% likelihood that 2000 CR_{105} is in a 20:1 resonance, a 38% likelihood that 2003 QK_{91} is in a 10:3 resonance, and an 84% likelihood that (82075) 2000 YW134 is in an 8:3 resonance. (145480) 2005 TB190 appears to have less than a 1% likelihood of being in a 4:1 resonance.

=== Influence of hypothetical planet(s) beyond Neptune ===
Mike Brown—who made the Planet Nine hypothesis—makes an observation that "all of the known distant objects which are pulled even a little bit away from the Kuiper seem to be clustered under the influence of this hypothetical planet (specifically, objects with semimajor axis > 100 AU and perihelion > 42 AU)". Carlos de la Fuente Marcos and Ralph de la Fuente Marcos have calculated that some of the statistically significant commensurabilities are compatible with the Planet Nine hypothesis; in particular, a number of objects (Note: 60 minor planets with a semi-major axis greater than 150 AU and perihelion greater than 30 AU are known.) which are called extreme trans-Neptunian objects (ETNOs) may be trapped in the 5:3 and 3:1 mean-motion resonances with a putative Planet Nine with a semimajor axis ~700 AU.

== Possible detached objects ==
This is a list of known objects by discovery date that could not be easily scattered by Neptune's current orbit and therefore are likely to be detached objects, but that lie inside the perihelion gap of ≈50–75 AU that defines the sednoids.

Objects listed below have a perihelion of more than 40 AU, and a semi-major axis of more than 47.7 AU (the 1:2 resonance with Neptune, and the approximate outer limit of the Kuiper belt):

Designation	Diameter (km)	H	q (AU)	a (AU)	Q (AU)	ω (°)	Discovery Year	Discoverer	Notes & Refs
2000 CR_{105}	243	6.3	44.252	221.2	398	316.93	2000	M. W. Buie	
2000 YW_{134}	216	4.7	41.207	57.795	74.383	316.481	2000	Spacewatch	≈3:8 Neptune resonance
2001 FL193	81	8.7	40.29	50.26	60.23	108.6	2001	R. L. Allen, G. Bernstein, R. Malhotra	orbit extremely poor, might not be a TNO
2001 KA77	634	5.0	43.41	47.74	52.07	120.3	2001	M. W. Buie	borderline classical KBO
2002 CP154	222	6.5	42	52	62	50	2002	M. W. Buie	orbit fairly poor, but definitely a detached object
2003 UY291	147	7.4	41.19	48.95	56.72	15.6	2003	M. W. Buie	borderline classical KBO
Sedna	995	1.5	76.072	483.3	890	311.61	2003	M. E. Brown, C. A. Trujillo, D. L. Rabinowitz	Sednoid
2004 PD112	267	6.1	40	70	90	40	2004	M. W. Buie	orbit very poor, might not be a detached object
Alicanto	222	6.5	47.308	315	584	326.925	2004	Cerro Tololo (unspecified)	
2004 XR190	612	4.1	51.085	57.336	63.586	284.93	2004	R. L. Allen, B. J. Gladman, J. J. Kavelaars; J.-M. Petit, J. W. Parker, P. Nicholson	very high inclination; Neptune Mean Motion Resonance (MMR) along with the Kozai Resonance (KR) modified the eccentricity and inclination of 2004 XR_{190} to obtain a very high perihelion
2005 CG81	267	6.1	41.03	54.10	67.18	57.12	2005	CFEPS	—
2005 EO_{297}	161	7.2	41.215	62.98	84.75	349.86	2005	M. W. Buie	—
2005 TB_{190}	372	4.5	46.197	75.546	104.896	171.023	2005	A. C. Becker, A. W. Puckett, J. M. Kubica	Neptune Mean Motion Resonance (MMR) along with the Kozai Resonance (KR) modified the eccentricity and inclination to obtain a high perihelion
2006 AO101	168	7.1	—	—	—	—	2006	Mauna Kea (unspecified)	orbit extremely poor, might not be a TNO
2007 JJ_{43}	558	4.5	40.383	48.390	56.397	6.536	2007	Palomar (unspecified)	borderline classical KBO
2007 LE38	176	7.0	41.798	54.56	67.32	53.96	2007	Mauna Kea (unspecified)	—
2008 ST291	640	4.2	42.27	99.3	156.4	324.37	2008	M. E. Schwamb, M. E. Brown, D. L. Rabinowitz	≈1:6 Neptune resonance
2009 KX36	111	8.0	—	100	100	—	2009	Mauna Kea (unspecified)	orbit extremely poor, might not be a TNO
2010 DN_{93}	486	4.7	45.102	55.501	65.90	33.01	2010	Pan-STARRS	≈2:5 Neptune resonance; Neptune Mean Motion Resonance (MMR) along with the Kozai Resonance (KR) modified the eccentricity and inclination to obtain a high perihelion
2010 ER65	404	5.0	40.035	99.71	159.39	324.19	2010	D. L. Rabinowitz, S. W. Tourtellotte	—
2010 GB174	222	6.5	48.8	360	670	347.7	2010	Mauna Kea (unspecified)	—
2012 FH84	161	7.2	42	56	70	10	2012	Las Campanas (unspecified)	—
2012 VP113	702	4.0	80.47	256	431	293.8	2012	S. S. Sheppard, C. A. Trujillo	Sednoid
2013 FQ28	280	6.0	45.9	63.1	80.3	230	2013	S. S. Sheppard, C. A. Trujillo	≈1:3 Neptune resonance; Neptune Mean Motion Resonance (MMR) along with the Kozai Resonance (KR) modified the eccentricity and inclination to obtain a high perihelion
2013 FT28	202	6.7	43.5	310	580	40.3	2013	S. S. Sheppard	—
2013 GP_{136}	212	6.6	41.061	155.1	269.1	42.38	2013	OSSOS	—
2013 GQ136	222	6.5	40.79	49.06	57.33	155.3	2013	OSSOS	borderline classical KBO
2013 GG138	212	6.6	46.64	47.792	48.946	128	2013	OSSOS	borderline classical KBO
2013 JD_{64}	111	8.0	42.603	73.12	103.63	178.0	2013	OSSOS	—
2013 JJ_{64}	147	7.4	44.04	48.158	52.272	179.8	2013	OSSOS	borderline classical KBO
2013 SY99	202	6.7	50.02	694	1338	32.1	2013	OSSOS	—
2013 SK100	134	7.6	45.468	61.61	77.76	11.5	2013	OSSOS	—
2013 UT_{15}	255	6.3	43.89	195.7	348	252.33	2013	OSSOS	—
2013 UB17	176	7.0	44.49	62.31	80.13	308.93	2013	OSSOS	—
2013 VD24	128	7.8	40	50	70	197	2013	Dark Energy Survey	orbit very poor, might not be a detached object
2013 YJ151	336	5.4	40.866	72.35	103.83	141.83	2013	Pan-STARRS	—
2014 EZ51	770	3.7	40.70	52.49	64.28	329.84	2014	Pan-STARRS	—
2014 FC69	533	4.6	40.28	73.06	105.8	190.57	2014	S. S. Sheppard, C. A. Trujillo	
2014 FZ71	185	6.9	55.9	76.2	96.5	245	2014	S. S. Sheppard, C. A. Trujillo	≈1:4 Neptune resonance; Neptune Mean Motion Resonance (MMR) along with the Kozai Resonance (KR) modified the eccentricity and inclination to obtain a very high perihelion
2014 FC72	509	4.5	51.670	76.329	100.99	32.85	2014	Pan-STARRS	≈1:4 Neptune resonance; Neptune Mean Motion Resonance (MMR) along with the Kozai Resonance (KR) modified the eccentricity and inclination to obtain a very high perihelion
2014 JM80	352	5.5	46.00	63.00	80.01	96.1	2014	Pan-STARRS	≈1:3 Neptune resonance; Neptune Mean Motion Resonance (MMR) along with the Kozai Resonance (KR) modified the eccentricity and inclination to obtain a high perihelion
2014 JS80	306	5.5	40.013	48.291	56.569	174.5	2014	Pan-STARRS	borderline classical KBO
2014 OJ394	423	5.0	40.80	52.97	65.14	271.60	2014	Pan-STARRS	in 3:7 Neptune resonance
2014 QR441	193	6.8	42.6	67.8	93.0	283	2014	Dark Energy Survey	—
2014 SR349	202	6.6	47.6	300	540	341.1	2014	S. S. Sheppard, C. A. Trujillo	—
2014 SS349	134	7.6	45	140	240	148	2014	S. S. Sheppard, C. A. Trujillo	≈2:10 Neptune resonance; Neptune Mean Motion Resonance (MMR) along with the Kozai Resonance (KR) modified the eccentricity and inclination to obtain a high perihelion
2014 ST373	330	5.5	50.13	104.0	157.8	297.52	2014	Dark Energy Survey	—
2014 UT228	154	7.3	43.97	48.593	53.216	49.9	2014	OSSOS	borderline classical KBO
2014 UA230	222	6.5	42.27	55.05	67.84	132.8	2014	OSSOS	—
2014 UO231	97	8.3	42.25	55.11	67.98	234.56	2014	OSSOS	—
2014 WK509	584	4.0	40.08	50.79	61.50	135.4	2014	Pan-STARRS	—
2014 WB556	147	7.4	42.6	280	520	234	2014	Dark Energy Survey	—
2015 AL281	293	6.1	42	48	54	120	2015	Pan-STARRS	borderline classical KBO orbit very poor, might not be a detached object
2015 AM_{281}	486	4.8	41.380	55.372	69.364	157.72	2015	Pan-STARRS	—
2015 BE_{519}	352	5.5	44.82	47.866	50.909	293.2	2015	Pan-STARRS	borderline classical KBO
2015 FJ345	117	7.9	51	63.0	75.2	78	2015	S. S. Sheppard, C. A. Trujillo	≈1:3 Neptune resonance; Neptune Mean Motion Resonance (MMR) along with the Kozai Resonance (KR) modified the eccentricity and inclination to obtain a very high perihelion
2015 GP50	222	6.5	40.4	55.2	70.0	130	2015	S. S. Sheppard, C. A. Trujillo	—
2015 KH162	671	3.9	41.63	62.29	82.95	296.805	2015	S. S. Sheppard, D. J. Tholen, C. A. Trujillo	—
2015 KG163	101	8.3	40.502	826	1610	32.06	2015	OSSOS	—
2015 KH163	117	7.9	40.06	157.2	274	230.29	2015	OSSOS	≈1:12 Neptune resonance
2015 KE172	106	8.1	44.137	133.12	222.1	15.43	2015	OSSOS	1:9 Neptune resonance
2015 KG172	280	6.0	42	55	69	35	2015	R. L. Allen; D. James; D. Herrera	orbit fairly poor, might not be a detached object
2015 KQ174	154	7.3	49.31	55.40	61.48	294.0	2015	Mauna Kea (unspecified)	≈2:5 Neptune resonance; Neptune Mean Motion Resonance (MMR) along with the Kozai Resonance (KR) modified the eccentricity and inclination to obtain a very high perihelion
2015 RX245	255	6.2	45.5	410	780	65.3	2015	OSSOS	—
Leleākūhonua	300	5.5	65.02	1042	2019	118.0	2015	S. S. Sheppard, C. A. Trujillo, D. J. Tholen	Sednoid
2017 DP121	161	7.2	40.52	50.48	60.45	217.9	2017		—
2017 FP161	168	7.1	40.88	47.99	55.1	218	2017		borderline classical KBO
2017 SN132	97	5.8	40.949	79.868	118.786	148.769	2017	S. S. Sheppard, C. A. Trujillo, D. J. Tholen	
2018 VM35	134	7.6	45.289	240.575	435.861	302.008	2018	Mauna Kea (unspecified)	

The following objects can also be generally thought to be detached objects, although with slightly lower perihelion distances of 38–40 AU.

Designation	Diameter (km)	H	q (AU)	a (AU)	Q (AU)	ω (°)	Discovery Year	Discoverer	Notes & Refs
2003 HB_{57}	147	7.4	38.116	166.2	294	11.082	2003	Mauna Kea (unspecified)	—
2003 SS422	168	7.04	39.574	198.181	356.788	206.824	2003	Cerro Tololo (unspecified)	—
2005 RH52	128	7.8	38.957	152.6	266.3	32.285	2005	CFEPS	—
2007 TC434	168	7.0	39.577	128.41	217.23	351.010	2007	Las Campanas (unspecified)	1:9 Neptune resonance
2012 FL84	212	6.6	38.607	106.25	173.89	141.866	2012	Pan-STARRS	—
2014 FL72	193	6.8	38.1	104	170	259.49	2014	Cerro Tololo (unspecified)	—
2014 JW80	352	5.5	38.161	142.62	247.1	131.61	2014	Pan-STARRS	—
2014 YK_{50}	293	5.6	38.972	120.52	202.1	169.31	2014	Pan-STARRS	—
2015 DM319		8.78	39.491	272.302	505.113	43.227	2015	OSSOS	
2015 GT50	88	8.6	38.46	333	627	129.3	2015	OSSOS	—

== See also ==
- Classical Kuiper belt object
- List of Solar System objects by greatest aphelion
- List of trans-Neptunian objects
- Extreme trans-Neptunian object
- Planets beyond Neptune
