= (82075) 2000 YW134 =

Trans-Neptunian binary

(82075) 2000 YW_{134}
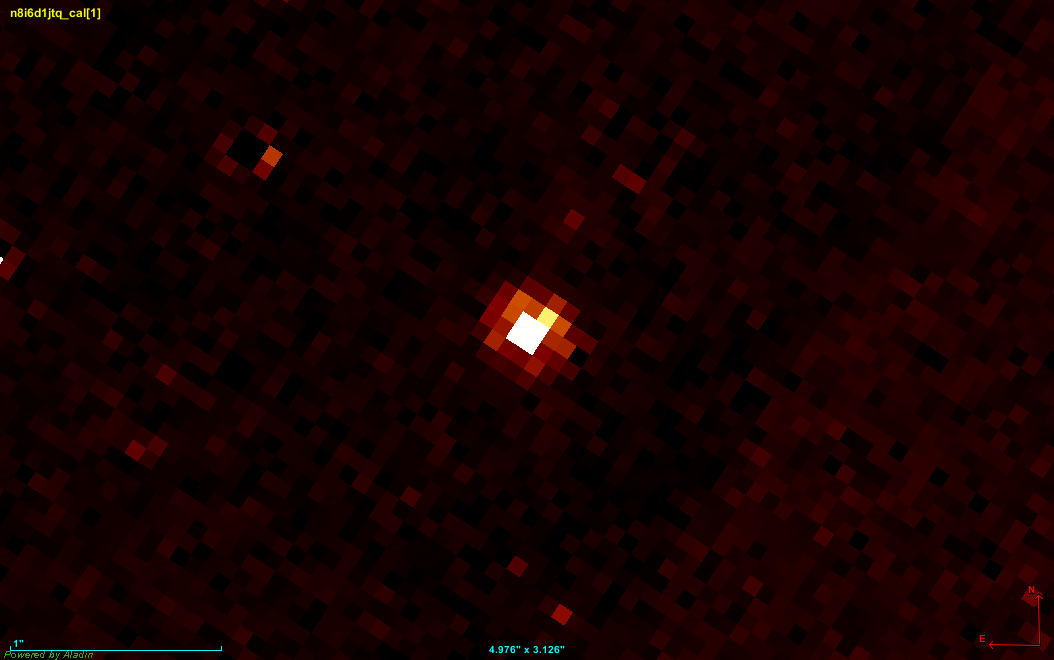
- 2000 YW_{134} and its satellite (upper right) imaged by the Hubble Space Telescope on 25 October 2002

Discovery
- Discovered by: Spacewatch
- Discovery site: Kitt Peak National Obs.
- Discovery date: 26 December 2000

Designations
- Alternative designations: 2001 XG_{201}
- Minor planet category: TNO · res (3:8)

Orbital characteristics
- Epoch 1 July 2021 (JD 2459396.5)
- Uncertainty parameter 2
- Observation arc: 20.19 yr (7,373 d)
- Aphelion: 73.783 AU
- Perihelion: 40.999 AU
- Semi-major axis: 57.391 AU
- Eccentricity: 0.2856
- Orbital period (sidereal): 434.78 yr (158,805 d)
- Mean anomaly: 35.927°
- Mean motion: 0° 0^{m} 8.28^{s} / day
- Inclination: 19.866°
- Longitude of ascending node: 127.00°
- Argument of perihelion: 314.98°
- Known satellites: 1 (D_{s}/D_{p}: 0.347)

Physical characteristics
- Mean diameter: 229 km (effective); 216 km (primary); 75 km (secondary)
- Geometric albedo: >0.08; 0.408±0.329
- Spectral type: IR (reddish); B−V = 0.93; V–R = 0.50
- Apparent magnitude: 21.54
- Absolute magnitude (H): 4.72

(82075) 2000 YW_{134} is a resonant trans-Neptunian object and binary system, located in the outermost region of the Solar System. It was discovered on 26 December 2000, by astronomers with the Spacewatch survey at Kitt Peak Observatory near Tucson, Arizona. The reddish object stays in a rare 3:8 resonance with Neptune. A smaller companion was discovered by the Hubble Space Telescope in October 2002.

== Orbit and classification ==
2000 YW_{134} orbits the Sun at a distance of 41.0–73.8 AU once every 434 years and 9 months (158,805 days; semi-major axis of 57.39 AU). Its orbit has an eccentricity of 0.29 and an inclination of 20° with respect to the ecliptic. The body's observation arc begins with its official discovery observation by Spacewatch on 26 December 2000. It last came to perihelion in 1979, and is currently at about 46.5 AU from the Sun, with an apparent magnitude of 21.54. It will reach aphelion in December 2197.

2000 YW_{134} is a resonant trans-Neptunian object that stays in a rare 3:8 mean-motion orbital resonance with Neptune, orbiting exactly three times the Sun for every 8 orbits Neptune does. There are currently two other objects known to have the same resonant type: 2014 UE228 and (542258) 2013 AP183. Due to its relatively large distance to Neptune, a classification as an extended-scattered or detached object was also considered earlier on (Lykawka, 2006). However, improved observations and long-term numerical integrations of the object's orbit by Emelʹyanenko and Kiseleva (84% probability) and the Deep Ecliptic Survey – with all alternative integrations in agreement, showing a minimum perihelion distance of 38.2 AU – have since secured its 3:8 orbital resonance with Neptune.

== Numbering and naming ==
This minor planet was numbered by the Minor Planet Center on 4 May 2004, receiving the number 82075 in the minor planet catalog (M.P.C. 51853). As of 2025, it has not been named. According to the established naming conventions, it will be given a mythological name.

== Physical characteristics ==
The surface of 2000 YW_{134} is moderately red in the visible part of the spectrum. Its IR spectral type transitions from the very red (RR) to the intermediate blue-red (BR). Alternatively a BR-spectral type has also been assumed. The object's B−V and V–R color indices have also been measured several times, giving an averaged value of close to 1.0 and 0.5, respectively, for a combined B−R magnitude of 1.50.

=== Diameter and albedo ===
In 2010, observations with the Herschel Space Observatory constrained the object's geometric albedo to no darker than 8%, and allowed to place an upper limit on its effective mean diameter of 500 km (310 mi), as no thermal radiation had been detected. However, according to Michael Mommert's dissertation in 2013, the object has a much higher albedo of 0.408±0.329, which greatly reduces its effective diameter to 229 km (140 mi).

=== Satellite ===
On 25 October 2002, observations in the far-infrared with the NICMOS instrument of the Hubble Space Telescope revealed that 2000 YW_{134} is a binary system. The discovery was announced on 6 October 2005. Johnston's Archive derives a diameter of 216 km (130 mi) for the primary and a diameter of 75 km (47 mi) for the secondary, based on a secondary-to-primary diameter ratio of 0.347, for a difference of 1.3 magnitudes between the two objects. The satellite orbits its primary every 10 days (estimated) at an average distance of 1,900 km (1,200 mi).
