= (506479) 2003 HB57 =

Extreme trans-Neptunian object

(506479) 2003 HB_{57}
Discovery
- Discovered by: Mauna Kea Obs.
- Discovery site: Mauna Kea Obs.
- Discovery date: 26 April 2003

Designations
- Minor planet category: TNO · E-SDO distant · detached

Orbital characteristics
- Epoch 4 September 2017 (JD 2458000.5)
- Uncertainty parameter 4
- Observation arc: 13.94 yr (5,090 days)
- Aphelion: 294.21 AU
- Perihelion: 38.109 AU
- Semi-major axis: 166.16 AU
- Eccentricity: 0.7706
- Orbital period (sidereal): 2141.87 yr (782,317 days)
- Mean anomaly: 1.4255°
- Mean motion: 0° 0^{m} 1.8^{s} / day
- Inclination: 15.473°
- Longitude of ascending node: 197.82°
- Argument of perihelion: 11.013°

Physical characteristics
- Mean diameter: 147 km 200 km
- Geometric albedo: 0.04; 0.09
- Spectral type: BR
- Absolute magnitude (H): 7.4 · 7.6

(506479) 2003 HB_{57} is an extreme trans-Neptunian object of the extended scattered disc in the outermost region of the Solar System, approximately 180 kilometers in diameter. It was discovered by astronomers at the Mauna Kea Observatory on 26 April 2003.

== Description ==
2003 HB_{57} orbits the Sun at a distance of 38.1–294.2 AU once every 2141 years and 10 months (782,317 days). Its orbit has an eccentricity of 0.77 and an inclination of 15° with respect to the ecliptic.

=== Extended scattered disc ===
It is one of a small group of extreme trans-Neptunian objects with perihelion distances of 30 AU or more, and semi-major axes of 150 AU or more. Such objects can not have reached their present-day orbits without the gravitational influence of some perturbing object, which leads to the speculation of Planet Nine.

=== Physical characterization ===
2003 HB_{57} has a BR-type spectrum and an estimated diameter of 147 and 200 kilometers based on an assumed albedo of 0.09 and 0.04, respectively.
