= (674118) 2015 KH162 =

Trans-Neptunian object

(674118) 2015 KH_{162}
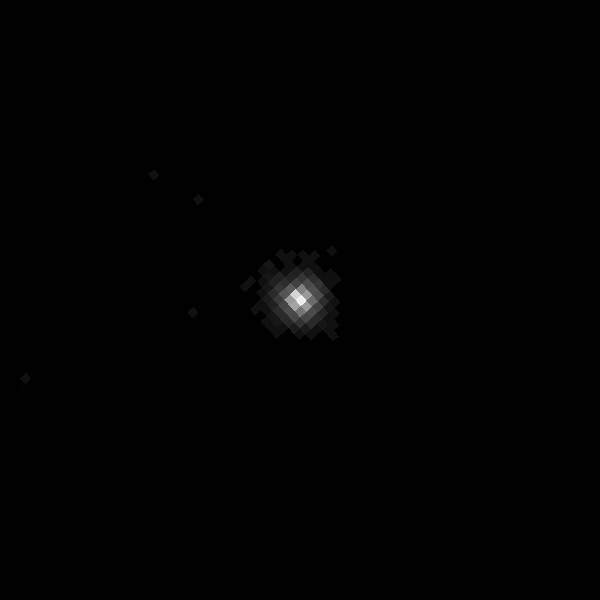
- 2015 KH_{162} photographed by the Hubble Space Telescope on 2 June 2026

Discovery
- Discovered by: S. Sheppard; D. Tholen; C. Trujillo
- Discovery site: Mauna Kea Obs.
- Discovery date: 18 May 2015

Designations
- Minor planet category: TNO · SDO; near-scattered (DES)

Orbital characteristics
- Epoch 1 July 2021 (JD 2459396.5)
- Uncertainty parameter 2
- Observation arc: 11.36 yr (4,149 d)
- Aphelion: 82.117 AU
- Perihelion: 41.513 AU
- Semi-major axis: 61.815 AU
- Eccentricity: 0.3284
- Orbital period (sidereal): 486.02 yr (177,517 d)
- Mean anomaly: 67.564°
- Mean motion: 0° 0^{m} 7.2^{s} / day
- Inclination: 28.903°
- Longitude of ascending node: 201.01°
- Argument of perihelion: 295.63°
- Known satellites: 0

Physical characteristics
- Mean diameter: 566 km (est.)
- Geometric albedo: 0.124?
- Apparent magnitude: 22.24
- Absolute magnitude (H): 4.12

(674118) 2015 KH_{162} is a large trans-Neptunian object orbiting in the scattered disc region of the outermost Solar System. First observed in 2015, this minor planet is one of the most distant objects from the Sun at 60.6 AU, or twice as far as Neptune.

The Hubble Space Telescope photographed 2015 KH_{162} on 2 June 2026, during a search for moons around large trans-Neptunian objects.

== Discovery ==
2015 KH_{162} was first observed on 18 May 2015, in the constellation of Serpens by astronomers at the Mauna Kea Observatories using the Subaru Telescope. The discovery was announced by Scott Sheppard, David Tholen and Chad Trujillo on 23 February 2016. At the time, this minor planet was at a distance of 59.0 AU from the Sun and had a relatively bright magnitude of 21.4 for its enormous distance.

== Orbit and classification ==
2015 KH_{162} orbits the Sun at a distance of 41.5–82.1 AU once every 486 years (177,517 days; semi-major axis of 61.82 AU). Its orbit has an eccentricity of 0.33 and an inclination of 29° with respect to the ecliptic.

It is classified as a scattered disc object, or "near-scattered" object in the classification of the Deep Ecliptic Survey, that still gravitationally interacts with Neptune (30.1 AU) due to its relatively low perihelion of 41.5 AU, contrary to the extended-scattered/detached objects and sednoids, the latter of which stay well beyond the Kuiper cliff at 47.8 AU.

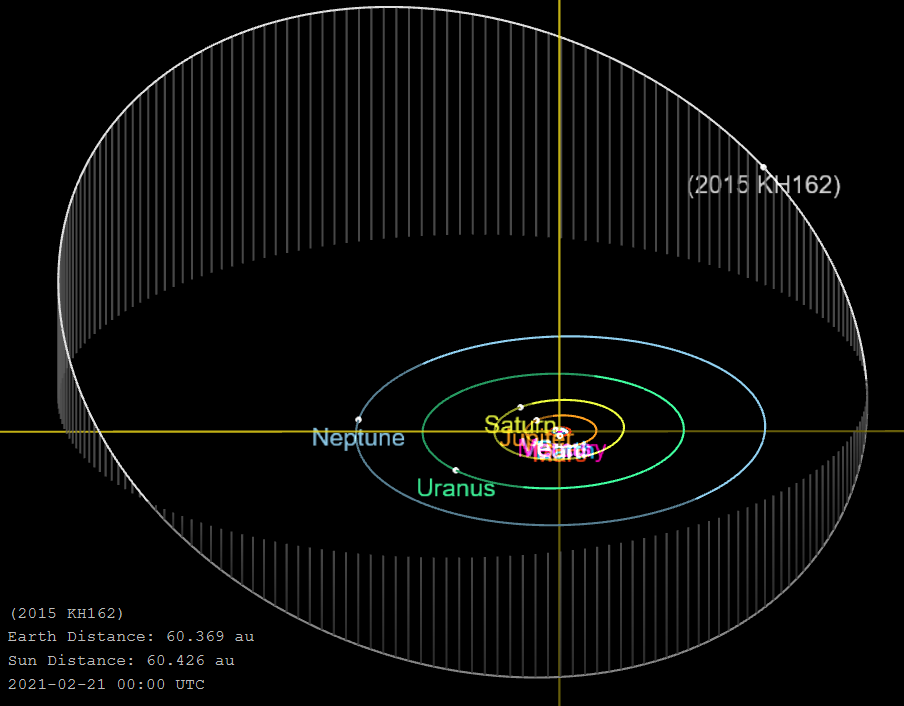
Diagram of 2015 KH_{162}'s orbit

=== Most distant objects from the Sun ===
2015 KH_{162} last came to perihelion around 1930, moving away from the Sun ever since and is currently at about 61.9 AU, twice as far from the Sun than Neptune. Its current distance makes it one of the most distant known minor planets in the Solar System (also see List of Solar System objects most distant from the Sun § Known distant objects). In 2415, the object will reach its aphelion at 82.1 AU.

== Physical characteristics ==
Based on a generic magnitude-to-diameter conversion, 2015 KH_{162} measures approximately 566 kilometers (350 miles) in diameter, for an assumed albedo of 0.124 and a magnitude of 4.1. As of 2021, no rotational lightcurve for this object has been obtained from photometric observations. The body's rotation period and pole as well as its albedo and surface composition remain unknown.
