= 2015 KG163 =

Extreme trans-Neptunian object

2015 KG_{163}
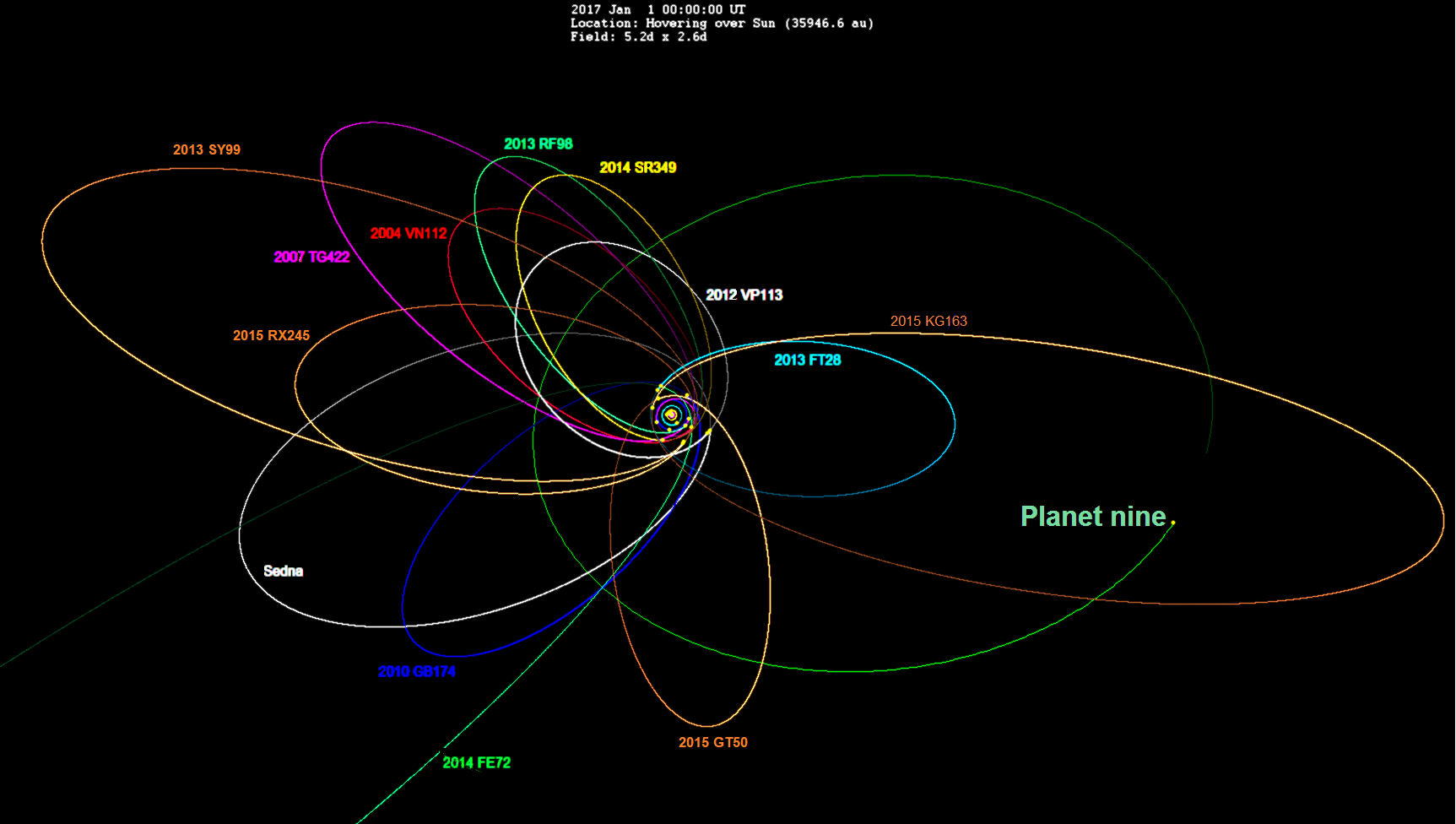
- The orbit of 2015 KG_{163} (right side, in orange) and other extreme detached objects, along with the hypothetical Planet Nine's orbit on the right

Discovery
- Discovered by: OSSOS
- Discovery site: Mauna Kea Obs.
- Discovery date: 24 May 2015

Designations
- Alternative designations: o5m52
- Minor planet category: TNO · detached · distant

Orbital characteristics (barycentric)
- Epoch 25 February 2023 (JD 2460000.5)
- Uncertainty parameter 3
- Observation arc: 2.02 yr (739 days)
- Earliest precovery date: 17 May 2015
- Aphelion: 1319 AU
- Perihelion: 40.493 AU
- Semi-major axis: 679.816 AU
- Eccentricity: 0.94043
- Orbital period (sidereal): 17713 yr
- Mean anomaly: 0.014°
- Mean motion: 0° 0^{m} 0.2^{s} / day
- Inclination: 13.994°
- Longitude of ascending node: 219.103°
- Time of perihelion: ≈ 10 August 2022 ±2 months (Note: Uncertainty in the perihelion date is 18 days (1-sigma) or 54 days (3-sigma) according to JPL's Small-Body Database.)
- Argument of perihelion: 32.097°

Physical characteristics
- Mean diameter: 65–150 km (est. 0.04–0.20)
- Apparent magnitude: 24.2 (discovery)
- Absolute magnitude (H): 8.2

2015 KG_{163} is a trans-Neptunian object from the outermost region of the Solar System, approximately 102 kilometers (63 miles) in diameter. It was first observed on 24 May 2015, by astronomers of the Outer Solar System Origins Survey using the Canada–France–Hawaii Telescope at Mauna Kea Observatories, Hawaii, United States. With an observation arc of 2 years, it passed perihelion around August 2022 at a velocity of 6.5 km/s with respect to the Sun.

2015 KG_{163} is one a small number of detached objects with perihelion distances of 30 AU or more, and semi-major axes of 250 AU or more. Such objects can not reach such orbits without some perturbing object, which leads to the speculation of Planet Nine. Its argument of perihelion is similar to that of 2013 FT28, but its semi-major axis is larger, such that its orbit may cross that of Planet Nine.

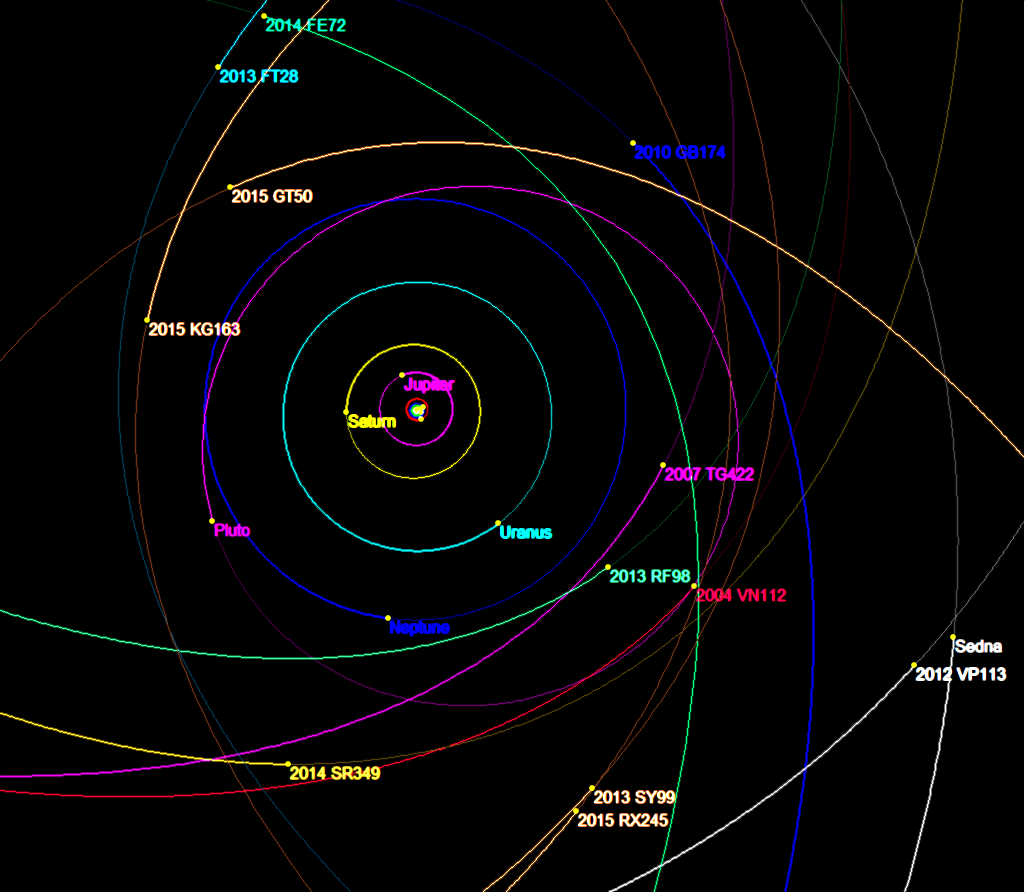
Closeup of current position near perihelion, passing downward from the upper left of this view
