= (145480) 2005 TB190 =

Trans-Neptunian object

(145480) 2005 TB_{190}
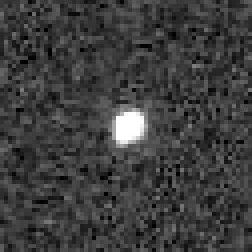
- Hubble Space Telescope image of 2005 TB_{190} taken in 2011

Discovery
- Discovered by: Becker, A. C., Puckett, A. W., Kubica, J at Apache Point (705)
- Discovery date: 11 October 2005

Designations
- Minor planet category: Ext-SDO (DES)

Orbital characteristics
- Epoch 13 January 2016 (JD 2457400.5)
- Uncertainty parameter 3
- Observation arc: 5041 days (13.80 yr)
- Aphelion: 104.14 AU (15.579 Tm) (Q)
- Perihelion: 46.197 AU (6.9110 Tm) (q)
- Semi-major axis: 75.166 AU (11.2447 Tm) (a)
- Eccentricity: 0.38540 (e)
- Orbital period (sidereal): 651.69 yr (238031 d)
- Mean anomaly: 359.520° (M)
- Mean motion: 0° 0^{m} 5.445^{s} / day (n)
- Inclination: 26.5376° (i)
- Longitude of ascending node: 180.4280° (Ω)
- Argument of perihelion: 171.47° (ω)
- Known satellites: 0
- Earth MOID: 45.1927 AU (6.76073 Tm)
- Jupiter MOID: 41.2446 AU (6.17010 Tm)

Physical characteristics
- Dimensions: 507+127 −116 km
- Synodic rotation period: 12.68 h (0.528 d)
- Sidereal rotation period: 12.68 hours
- Geometric albedo: 0.148+0.051 −0.036; 0.12–0.20
- Temperature: 40.2 K (perihelion)
- Spectral type: CO_{2}-type ("double-dip"); B−V=0.98; V−R=0.56
- Apparent magnitude: 21.51±0.07
- Absolute magnitude (H): 4.40±0.11, 4.6

(145480) 2005 TB_{190} is a trans-Neptunian object (TNO) with an absolute magnitude of 4.4.

== Orbit ==
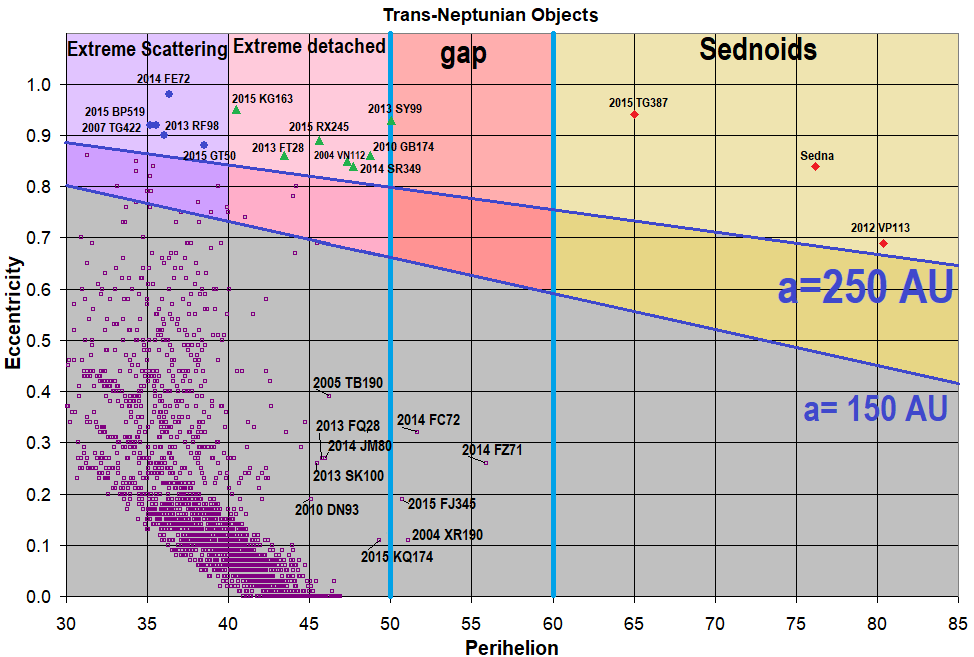
2005 TB_{190} is located near the "gap", a poorly understood region.

2005 TB_{190} is classified as scattered-extended by the Deep Ecliptic Survey (DES), because its orbit appears to be beyond significant gravitational interactions with Neptune's current orbit. However, if Neptune migrated outward, there would have been a period when Neptune had a higher eccentricity. The aphelion of 2005 TB_{190} lies at 104 AU.

Simulations by Emelʹyanenko and Kiseleva in 2007 showed that 2005 TB_{190} appears to have less than a 1% chance of being in a 4:1 resonance with Neptune.

It has been observed 202 times over seven oppositions. It came to perihelion in January 2017. There are precovery observations dating back to November 2001.

== Physical properties ==
History of size estimates for 2005 TB_{190}
Year	Diameter (km)	References
2010	372.5±37.5	
2012	464±62	
2013	507+127 −116	

In 2010, thermal flux from 2005 TB_{190} in the far-infrared was measured by the Herschel Space Telescope. Initially, its size was estimated to lie within a range from 335 to 410 km. Upon further analysis, its size was estimated to be around 507 km (315 mi).

In the visible light, 2005 TB_{190} has a moderately red spectral slope.

The TNO was found in 2009 to have a rotation period of 12.68 ±3 hours, a common value for trans-Neptunian objects of its size. Similarly sized (120348) 2004 TY364 has a rotation period of 11.7 ± 3 hours.
