= 2014 SR349 =

Trans-Neptunian object

2014 SR_{349}
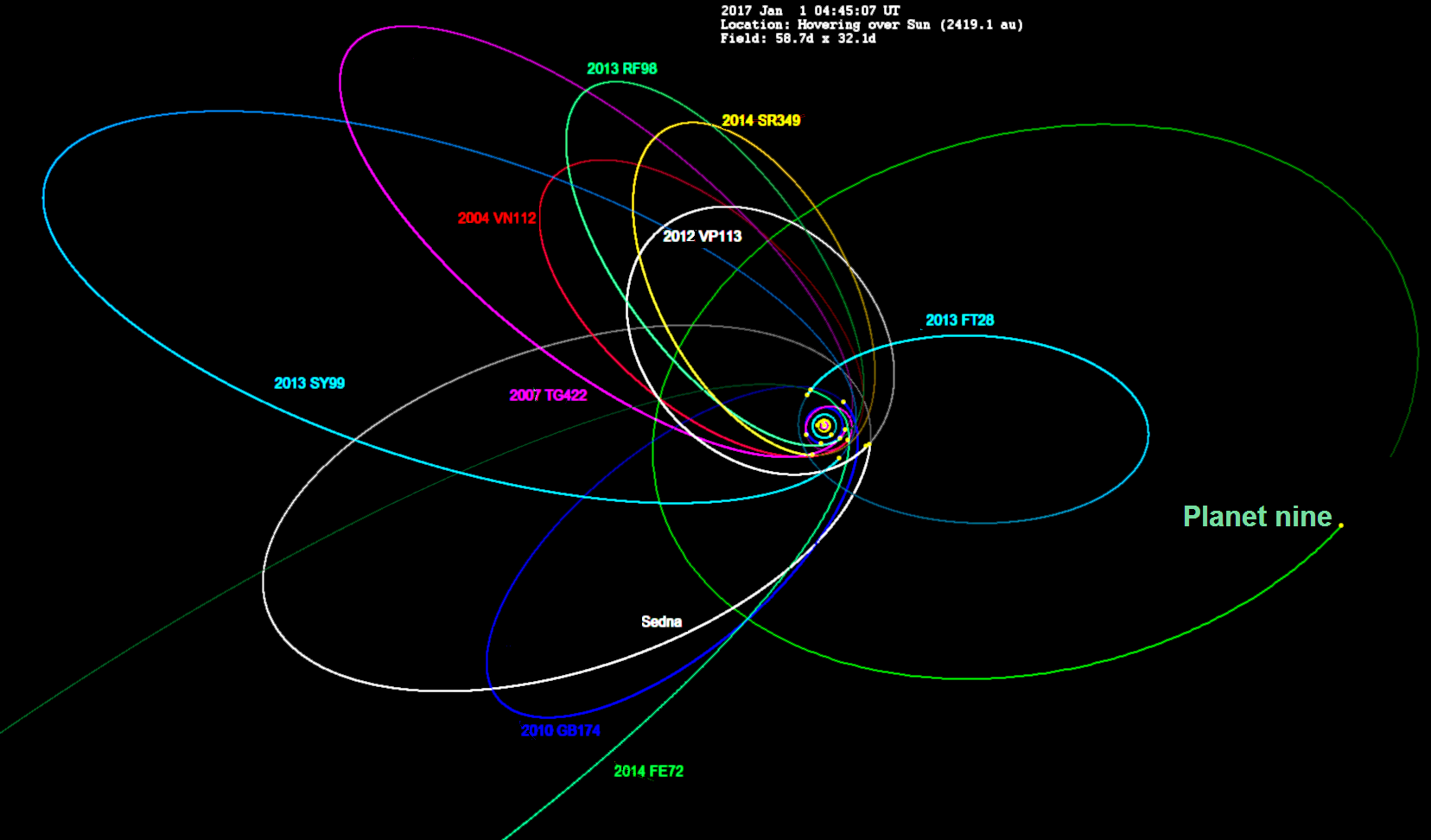
- The orbits of 2014 SR_{349} (yellow) and other detached objects, along with the hypothetical Planet Nine's orbit on the right.

Discovery
- Discovered by: Scott Sheppard and Chad Trujillo
- Discovery date: 19 September 2014

Designations
- Minor planet category: TNO; E-SDO (detached object)

Orbital characteristics
- Epoch 16 February 2017 (JD 2457800.5)
- Uncertainty parameter 5
- Observation arc: 738 days (2.02 yr)
- Aphelion: 549 AU (barycentric); 535 AU
- Perihelion: 47.57 AU
- Semi-major axis: 299 AU (barycentric); 292 AU
- Eccentricity: 0.8369
- Orbital period (sidereal): 5157 yr (barycentric); 4981 yr
- Mean anomaly: 357.3°
- Mean motion: 0.00019622°/day
- Inclination: 17.98°
- Longitude of ascending node: 34.75°
- Argument of perihelion: 341.35°

Physical characteristics
- Dimensions: ~200 km
- Absolute magnitude (H): 6.6

2014 SR_{349} is a trans-Neptunian object and scattered disc object in the outermost part of the Solar System. It was first observed on 19 September 2014 by astronomers Scott Sheppard and Chad Trujillo at Cerro Tololo Observatory, Chile, and revealed on 29 August 2016. It currently has a magnitude of 24.12.
