= List of unnumbered trans-Neptunian objects: 2014 =

The following is a partial list of unnumbered trans-Neptunian objects for principal designations assigned within 2014. As of October 2026, it contains a total of 480 bodies. For more information see the description on the main page. Also see list for the previous and next year.

== 2014 ==
Designation	First Observed (discovered)		D (km)	Orbital description						Remarks	Refs
Designation	Date	Observer (Site)	D (km)	Class	a (AU)	e	i (°)	q (AU)	Q (AU)	Remarks	Refs
2014 CW_{14}	10 February 2014	Mt. Lemmon Survey (G96)	9	damocloid	32.8	0.87	171	4.4	61.3	albedo: 0.048; BRmag: 1.38	MPC · JPL
2014 DM_{206}	19 February 2014	DECam (W84)	158	other TNO	40.5	0.10	22	36.6	44.4	albedo: 0.13	MPC · JPL
2014 DT_{112}	26 February 2014	Pan-STARRS 1 (F51)	43	centaur	48.0	0.72	41	13.3	82.8	albedo: 0.058	MPC · JPL
2014 FA_{70}	25 March 2014	Cerro Tololo Observatory, La Serena (807)	—	—	49.5	0.27	31	36.2	62.9	—	MPC · JPL
2014 FA_{72}	25 March 2014	S. S. Sheppard, C. A. Trujillo (807)	137	SDO	56.7	0.39	5	34.3	79.0	albedo: 0.124	MPC · JPL
2014 FB_{62}	30 March 2014	DECam (W84)	130	plutino	39.5	0.19	6	32.2	46.8	albedo: 0.074	MPC · JPL
2014 FC_{62}	30 March 2014	DECam (W84)	108	cubewano (cold)	45.8	0.14	2	39.5	52.0	albedo: 0.152	MPC · JPL
2014 FC_{69}	25 March 2014	Cerro Tololo Observatory, La Serena (807)	433	SDO	72.4	0.45	30	40.1	104.7	albedo: 0.124	MPC · JPL
2014 FC_{70}	25 March 2014	Cerro Tololo Observatory, La Serena (807)	—	—	45.9	0.25	22	34.5	57.3	—	MPC · JPL
2014 FC_{71}	25 March 2014	Cerro Tololo Observatory, La Serena (807)	—	—	43.6	0.31	17	30.2	56.9	—	MPC · JPL
2014 FD_{70}	25 March 2014	Cerro Tololo Observatory, La Serena (807)	157	SDO	56.6	0.36	27	36.1	77.1	albedo: 0.124	MPC · JPL
2014 FE_{62}	30 March 2014	DECam (W84)	—	—	43.3	0.06	2	41.0	45.7	—	MPC · JPL
2014 FE72	26 March 2014	Cerro Tololo Observatory, La Serena (807)	218	ESDO	2659.5	0.99	21	36.1	5282.9	albedo: 0.124	MPC · JPL
2014 FF_{70}	25 March 2014	Cerro Tololo Observatory, La Serena (807)	—	—	44.4	0.09	23	40.4	48.5	—	MPC · JPL
2014 FF_{72}	24 March 2014	Cerro Tololo Observatory, La Serena (807)	157	SDO	50.3	0.27	27	36.6	64.0	albedo: 0.124	MPC · JPL
2014 FG_{62}	30 March 2014	DECam (W84)	—	—	42.7	0.11	15	38.1	47.2	—	MPC · JPL
2014 FG_{69}	24 March 2014	Cerro Tololo Observatory, La Serena (807)	—	—	55.2	0.32	15	37.3	73.0	—	MPC · JPL
2014 FG_{71}	26 March 2014	Cerro Tololo Observatory, La Serena (807)	—	—	46.2	0.14	24	39.6	52.8	—	MPC · JPL
2014 FG_{72}	24 March 2014	Cerro Tololo Observatory, La Serena (807)	182	cubewano (hot)?	46.7	0.22	35	36.4	57.0	albedo: 0.079	MPC · JPL
2014 FH_{69}	24 March 2014	Cerro Tololo Observatory, La Serena (807)	—	—	43.7	0.20	15	35.1	52.2	—	MPC · JPL
2014 FH_{71}	26 March 2014	Cerro Tololo Observatory, La Serena (807)	—	—	39.3	0.21	6	31.3	47.4	—	MPC · JPL
2014 FH_{72}	24 March 2014	Cerro Tololo Observatory, La Serena (807)	137	SDO	57.1	0.35	19	37.2	77.1	albedo: 0.124	MPC · JPL
2014 FJ_{69}	24 March 2014	Cerro Tololo Observatory, La Serena (807)	—	—	47.3	0.16	15	39.9	54.8	—	MPC · JPL
2014 FJ_{70}	25 March 2014	Cerro Tololo Observatory, La Serena (807)	—	—	75.4	0.52	13	36.4	114.5	—	MPC · JPL
2014 FJ_{71}	26 March 2014	Cerro Tololo Observatory, La Serena (807)	—	—	45.8	0.11	6	40.5	51.0	—	MPC · JPL
2014 FJ_{72}	24 March 2014	Cerro Tololo Observatory, La Serena (807)	275	res · 2:11?	95.2	0.60	15	38.4	152.1	albedo: 0.126	MPC · JPL
2014 FK_{72}	25 March 2014	Cerro Tololo Observatory, La Serena (807)	164	SDO	53.9	0.29	12	38.0	69.7	albedo: 0.124	MPC · JPL
2014 FL_{70}	25 March 2014	Cerro Tololo Observatory, La Serena (807)	231	res · 2:5	55.6	0.41	9	32.8	78.4	albedo: 0.126	MPC · JPL
2014 FL_{71}	26 March 2014	Cerro Tololo Observatory, La Serena (807)	—	—	47.6	0.24	7	36.3	58.8	—	MPC · JPL
2014 FL_{72}	26 March 2014	Cerro Tololo Observatory, La Serena (807)	165	SDO	104.3	0.64	29	37.9	170.7	albedo: 0.124	MPC · JPL
2014 FM_{62}	30 March 2014	DECam (W84)	—	—	42.4	0.01	1	41.9	42.8	—	MPC · JPL
2014 FM_{69}	24 March 2014	Cerro Tololo Observatory, La Serena (807)	—	—	51.5	0.26	20	37.9	65.0	—	MPC · JPL
2014 FM_{72}	25 March 2014	Cerro Tololo Observatory, La Serena (807)	217	SDO	55.4	0.39	5	33.9	76.8	albedo: 0.124	MPC · JPL
2014 FN_{62}	30 March 2014	DECam (W84)	—	—	58.2	0.55	2	26.2	90.2	—	MPC · JPL
2014 FN_{69}	24 March 2014	Cerro Tololo Observatory, La Serena (807)	—	—	41.4	0.10	15	37.3	45.4	—	MPC · JPL
2014 FN_{72}	24 March 2014	Cerro Tololo Observatory, La Serena (807)	—	—	55.5	0.20	17	44.1	66.8	—	MPC · JPL
2014 FN_{97}	28 March 2014	COIAS, Subaru Telescope (T09)	114	SDO	56.1	0.44	15	31.2	80.9	albedo: 0.124	MPC · JPL
2014 FO_{69}	24 March 2014	Cerro Tololo Observatory, La Serena (807)	143	SDO	55.0	0.30	16	38.4	71.5	albedo: 0.124	MPC · JPL
2014 FP_{43}	24 March 2014	Pan-STARRS 1 (F51)	201	cubewano (hot)?	44.9	0.16	28	38.0	51.8	albedo: 0.079	MPC · JPL
2014 FQ_{71}	26 March 2014	Cerro Tololo Observatory, La Serena (807)	—	—	41.5	0.06	15	39.0	44.0	—	MPC · JPL
2014 FR_{69}	24 March 2014	Cerro Tololo Observatory, La Serena (807)	—	—	47.8	0.23	16	36.8	58.7	—	MPC · JPL
2014 FT_{69}	24 March 2014	Cerro Tololo Observatory, La Serena (807)	150	cubewano (hot)?	41.3	0.12	21	36.4	46.1	albedo: 0.079	MPC · JPL
2014 FV_{71}	24 March 2014	Cerro Tololo Observatory, La Serena (807)	211	SDO	55.1	0.31	27	38.2	72.1	albedo: 0.124	MPC · JPL
2014 FV_{97}	—	—	—	—	49.9	0.24	20	37.7	62.1	—	MPC · JPL
2014 FW_{70}	25 March 2014	Cerro Tololo Observatory, La Serena (807)	—	—	50.5	0.28	24	36.6	64.5	—	MPC · JPL
2014 FX_{61}	30 March 2014	DECam (W84)	124	cubewano (hot)?	42.9	0.14	22	36.8	49.1	albedo: 0.079	MPC · JPL
2014 FX_{71}	28 March 2014	Cerro Tololo Observatory, La Serena (807)	171	res · 1:3	62.9	0.46	18	33.8	92.0	albedo: 0.126	MPC · JPL
2014 FY_{61}	30 March 2014	DECam (W84)	—	—	43.5	0.17	7	36.1	51.0	—	MPC · JPL
2014 FZ_{61}	30 March 2014	DECam (W84)	—	—	46.8	0.07	3	43.4	50.2	—	MPC · JPL
2014 FZ_{69}	24 March 2014	Cerro Tololo Observatory, La Serena (807)	—	—	38.6	0.10	28	34.6	42.6	—	MPC · JPL
2014 FZ71	24 March 2014	S. S. Sheppard, C. A. Trujillo (807)	157	SDO	75.9	0.26	25	55.9	95.8	albedo: 0.124	MPC · JPL
2014 GE_{54}	5 April 2014	Pan-STARRS 1 (F51)	172	twotino	47.7	0.26	17	35.4	60.0	albedo: 0.126	MPC · JPL
2014 GJ_{54}	5 April 2014	Pan-STARRS 1 (F51)	149	plutino	39.3	0.27	17	28.7	49.9	albedo: 0.074	MPC · JPL
2014 GK_{54}	5 April 2014	Pan-STARRS 1 (F51)	111	plutino	39.3	0.32	24	26.6	52.0	albedo: 0.074	MPC · JPL
2014 GT_{53}	5 April 2014	Pan-STARRS 1 (F51)	339	cubewano (hot)	46.1	0.10	12	41.6	50.6	albedo: 0.079	MPC · JPL
2014 HB_{211}	28 April 2014	DECam (W84)	—	—	40.4	0.05	40	38.5	42.4	—	MPC · JPL
2014 HC_{211}	28 April 2014	DECam (W84)	—	—	46.2	0.10	17	41.7	50.6	—	MPC · JPL
2014 HJ_{344}	30 April 2014	Pan-STARRS 1 (F51)	135	plutino	39.3	0.31	18	27.3	51.2	albedo: 0.074	MPC · JPL
2014 HK_{210}	23 April 2014	DECam (W84)	—	—	46.1	0.14	6	39.4	52.7	—	MPC · JPL
2014 HL_{208}	30 April 2014	DECam (W84)	—	—	47.8	0.27	11	34.8	60.8	—	MPC · JPL
2014 HM_{210}	23 April 2014	DECam (W84)	—	—	43.3	0.07	12	40.4	46.1	—	MPC · JPL
2014 HO_{211}	28 April 2014	Pan-STARRS 1 (F51)	203	SDO	65.2	0.42	44	38.0	92.5	albedo: 0.124	MPC · JPL
2014 HP_{208}	30 April 2014	DECam (W84)	206	SDO	64.8	0.42	27	37.5	92.0	albedo: 0.124	MPC · JPL
2014 HP_{210}	23 April 2014	DECam (W84)	—	—	62.5	0.43	23	35.8	89.2	—	MPC · JPL
2014 HQ_{210}	23 April 2014	DECam (W84)	—	—	45.3	0.11	10	40.4	50.2	—	MPC · JPL
2014 HR_{208}	30 April 2014	DECam (W84)	109	plutino	39.3	0.12	3	34.5	44.2	albedo: 0.074	MPC · JPL
2014 HR_{210}	23 April 2014	DECam (W84)	—	—	42.6	0.08	29	39.1	46.1	—	MPC · JPL
2014 HS_{208}	30 April 2014	DECam (W84)	—	—	43.6	0.17	3	36.0	51.1	—	MPC · JPL
2014 HS_{209}	23 April 2014	DECam (W84)	—	—	102.9	0.66	18	35.5	170.2	—	MPC · JPL
2014 HS_{210}	23 April 2014	DECam (W84)	—	—	47.4	0.10	7	42.6	52.2	—	MPC · JPL
2014 HT_{208}	30 April 2014	DECam (W84)	—	—	65.9	0.47	15	35.2	96.6	—	MPC · JPL
2014 HV_{208}	30 April 2014	DECam (W84)	112	cubewano (cold)	43.4	0.05	2	41.4	45.4	albedo: 0.152	MPC · JPL
2014 HW_{209}	23 April 2014	DECam (W84)	—	—	43.4	0.03	1	42.1	44.8	—	MPC · JPL
2014 HX_{209}	23 April 2014	DECam (W84)	78	cubewano (cold)?	44.3	0.04	3	42.4	46.3	albedo: 0.152	MPC · JPL
2014 HY_{210}	24 April 2014	DECam (W84)	—	—	44.1	0.06	4	41.4	46.7	—	MPC · JPL
2014 JC_{92}	4 May 2014	DECam (W84)	344	cubewano (hot)	45.6	0.13	9	39.6	51.7	albedo: 0.079	MPC · JPL
2014 JE_{80}	4 May 2014	Pan-STARRS 1 (F51)	62	centaur	89.1	0.80	28	17.9	160.2	albedo: 0.058	MPC · JPL
2014 JO_{80}	7 May 2014	Pan-STARRS 1 (F51)	136	plutino	39.0	0.29	16	27.7	50.3	contact binary albedo: 0.074	MPC · JPL
2014 JT_{80}	7 May 2014	Pan-STARRS 1 (F51)	162	plutino	39.4	0.22	15	31.0	47.9	albedo: 0.074	MPC · JPL
2014 JU_{80}	7 May 2014	Pan-STARRS 1 (F51)	273	SDO	53.1	0.33	12	35.8	70.4	albedo: 0.124	MPC · JPL
2014 JV_{80}	7 May 2014	Pan-STARRS 1 (F51)	167	centaur	48.0	0.40	8	28.8	67.1	albedo: 0.058	MPC · JPL
2014 KB_{102}	28 May 2014	Pan-STARRS 1 (F51)	142	res · 2:5	55.1	0.41	11	32.8	77.5	albedo: 0.126	MPC · JPL
2014 KC_{102}	28 May 2014	Pan-STARRS 1 (F51)	186	plutino	39.1	0.26	13	28.8	49.4	albedo: 0.074	MPC · JPL
2014 KD_{102}	28 May 2014	Pan-STARRS 1 (F51)	162	plutino	39.3	0.22	7	30.7	47.9	albedo: 0.074	MPC · JPL
2014 KE_{113}	21 May 2014	Pan-STARRS 1 (F51)	175	SDO	72.2	0.44	34	40.4	103.9	albedo: 0.124	MPC · JPL
2014 KS_{101}	23 May 2014	Pan-STARRS 1 (F51)	185	other TNO	38.3	0.02	24	37.5	39.2	albedo: 0.13	MPC · JPL
2014 KT_{101}	21 May 2014	Pan-STARRS 1 (F51)	163	res · 3:5	41.9	0.24	10	31.8	51.9	albedo: 0.126	MPC · JPL
2014 KX_{101}	23 May 2014	Pan-STARRS 1 (F51)	154	plutino	39.4	0.24	4	30.1	48.7	albedo: 0.074	MPC · JPL
2014 LT_{28}	4 June 2014	Pan-STARRS 1 (F51)	305	cubewano (hot)	44.0	0.07	10	41.2	46.9	albedo: 0.079	MPC · JPL
2014 LU_{28}	2 June 2014	Pan-STARRS 1 (F51)	157	SDO	54.7	0.35	32	35.4	74.1	albedo: 0.124	MPC · JPL
2014 MB_{103}	25 June 2014	New Horizons KBO Search (266)	38	cubewano (cold)	43.9	0.08	2	40.3	47.4	albedo: 0.152	MPC · JPL
2014 ME_{70}	30 June 2014	Pan-STARRS 1 (F51)	208	cubewano (hot)	42.5	0.15	8	36.2	48.8	albedo: 0.079	MPC · JPL
2014 MF_{70}	21 June 2014	Pan-STARRS 1 (F51)	221	plutino	39.2	0.24	5	29.8	48.7	albedo: 0.074	MPC · JPL
2014 MH_{105}	25 June 2014	New Horizons KBO Search (266)	64	res · 4:7	43.6	0.20	5	35.1	52.2	albedo: 0.126	MPC · JPL
2014 MH_{55}	29 June 2014	Pan-STARRS 1 (F51)	12	damocloid	44.0	0.90	92	4.5	83.5	albedo: 0.048	MPC · JPL
2014 MT69	24 June 2014	Hubble Space Telescope (250)	16	cubewano (cold)?	43.2	0.10	3	38.7	47.7	albedo: 0.152	MPC · JPL
2014 NB_{66}	7 July 2014	Pan-STARRS 1 (F51)	247	cubewano (cold)	45.7	0.08	5	42.0	49.4	albedo: 0.152 taxonomy: BR	MPC · JPL
2014 NB_{96}	1 July 2014	Pan-STARRS 1 (F51)	284	cubewano (hot)?	41.5	0.09	12	37.6	45.4	albedo: 0.079	MPC · JPL
2014 NC_{66}	8 July 2014	Pan-STARRS 1 (F51)	165	other TNO	47.4	0.22	44	37.0	57.8	albedo: 0.13	MPC · JPL
2014 ND_{81}	2 July 2014	Pan-STARRS 1 (F51)	211	cubewano (hot)?	41.4	0.12	24	36.5	46.3	albedo: 0.079	MPC · JPL
2014 NV_{65}	8 July 2014	Pan-STARRS 1 (F51)	81	centaur	113.0	0.80	12	22.2	203.8	albedo: 0.058	MPC · JPL
2014 NY_{65}	3 July 2014	Pan-STARRS 1 (F51)	179	other TNO	40.5	0.08	19	37.3	43.8	albedo: 0.13	MPC · JPL
2014 OC_{394}	28 July 2014	Pan-STARRS 1 (F51)	159	cubewano (cold)	43.6	0.05	3	41.3	45.9	albedo: 0.152	MPC · JPL
2014 OD_{394}	31 July 2014	Pan-STARRS 1 (F51)	351	cubewano (hot)	44.4	0.09	11	40.3	48.6	albedo: 0.079 taxonomy: IR	MPC · JPL
2014 OJ_{394}	26 July 2014	Pan-STARRS 1 (F51)	339	other TNO	52.4	0.22	35	40.7	64.2	albedo: 0.13	MPC · JPL
2014 OS393	30 July 2014	Hubble Space Telescope (250)	34	cubewano (cold)	43.9	0.02	4	43.2	44.6	binary: 24 km; albedo: 0.152	MPC · JPL
2014 OW_{393}	25 July 2014	Pan-STARRS 1 (F51)	63	centaur	42.3	0.66	22	14.4	70.1	albedo: 0.058	MPC · JPL
2014 PE_{88}	8 August 2014	DECam (W84)	177	cubewano (hot)?	40.2	0.08	23	37.2	43.2	albedo: 0.079	MPC · JPL
2014 PM_{82}	6 August 2014	Pan-STARRS 1 (F51)	160	res · 2:5	55.5	0.34	24	36.4	74.5	albedo: 0.126 taxonomy: RR	MPC · JPL
2014 PN70	6 August 2014	Hubble Space Telescope (250)	32	cubewano (cold)	44.0	0.06	4	41.4	46.6	albedo: 0.152	MPC · JPL
2014 PS_{70}	3 August 2014	Pan-STARRS 1 (F51)	195	cubewano (hot)?	41.5	0.06	15	39.1	43.9	albedo: 0.079	MPC · JPL
2014 PZ_{102}	3 August 2014	Pan-STARRS 1 (F51)	137	cubewano (cold)	44.0	0.11	5	39.1	48.9	albedo: 0.152	MPC · JPL
2014 QB_{527}	29 August 2014	Pan-STARRS 1 (F51)	202	cubewano (hot)?	41.6	0.05	20	39.5	43.7	albedo: 0.079	MPC · JPL
2014 QC_{442}	25 August 2014	Pan-STARRS 1 (F51)	221	res · 2:7	69.8	0.51	19	34.5	105.2	albedo: 0.126	MPC · JPL
2014 QE_{442}	19 August 2014	DECam (W84)	174	cubewano (hot)?	41.4	0.04	26	39.7	43.1	albedo: 0.079	MPC · JPL
2014 QF_{442}	16 August 2014	DECam (W84)	139	cubewano (hot)?	45.8	0.21	31	36.4	55.2	albedo: 0.079	MPC · JPL
2014 QF_{562}	19 August 2014	DECam (W84)	102	res · 3:5	42.5	0.16	19	35.8	49.3	albedo: 0.126	MPC · JPL
2014 QG_{442}	19 August 2014	DECam (W84)	166	SDO	53.9	0.37	30	34.3	73.6	albedo: 0.124	MPC · JPL
2014 QG_{562}	19 August 2014	DECam (W84)	104	twotino	47.8	0.16	16	40.3	55.4	albedo: 0.126	MPC · JPL
2014 QH_{562}	16 August 2014	DECam (W84)	90	other TNO	37.9	0.07	31	35.3	40.6	albedo: 0.13	MPC · JPL
2014 QH_{563}	18 August 2014	DECam (W84)	78	other TNO	37.1	0.14	13	32.0	42.1	albedo: 0.13	MPC · JPL
2014 QJ_{562}	17 August 2014	DECam (W84)	121	other TNO	37.9	0.05	27	36.1	39.6	albedo: 0.13	MPC · JPL
2014 QK_{562}	17 August 2014	DECam (W84)	110	cubewano (hot)?	46.1	0.19	40	37.5	54.6	albedo: 0.079	MPC · JPL
2014 QL_{562}	18 August 2014	DECam (W84)	177	cubewano (hot)?	45.0	0.16	17	38.0	52.1	albedo: 0.079	MPC · JPL
2014 QM_{441}	21 August 2014	Dark Energy Survey (W84)	94	plutino	39.9	0.29	18	28.5	51.3	albedo: 0.074 taxonomy: IR	MPC · JPL
2014 QM_{562}	18 August 2014	DECam (W84)	114	cubewano (hot)?	43.6	0.15	5	36.9	50.2	albedo: 0.079	MPC · JPL
2014 QO_{441}	21 August 2014	DECam (W84)	120	nep trj	30.2	0.10	19	27.2	33.3	albedo: 0.058; BRmag: 1.22	MPC · JPL
2014 QP_{441}	21 August 2014	DECam (W84)	73	nep trj	30.3	0.07	19	28.1	32.4	albedo: 0.058 taxonomy: RR	MPC · JPL
2014 QP_{562}	19 August 2014	DECam (W84)	98	SDO	76.7	0.52	24	36.5	116.9	albedo: 0.124	MPC · JPL
2014 QQ_{562}	19 August 2014	DECam (W84)	87	SDO	65.4	0.48	26	33.7	97.0	albedo: 0.124	MPC · JPL
2014 QR_{562}	19 August 2014	DECam (W84)	124	res · 2:11	94.7	0.58	28	40.0	149.4	albedo: 0.126	MPC · JPL
2014 QS_{510}	19 August 2014	DECam (W84)	93	res · 2:7	70.4	0.53	14	32.9	108.0	albedo: 0.126 taxonomy: IR	MPC · JPL
2014 QS_{562}	19 August 2014	DECam (W84)	148	SDO	130.2	0.69	25	40.3	220.0	albedo: 0.124	MPC · JPL
2014 QT_{495}	22 August 2014	DECam (W84)	71	SDO	57.4	0.48	45	30.1	84.8	albedo: 0.124	MPC · JPL
2014 QT_{510}	29 August 2014	DECam (W84)	118	plutino	39.4	0.22	29	30.7	48.1	albedo: 0.074	MPC · JPL
2014 QT_{562}	19 August 2014	DECam (W84)	141	cubewano (hot)?	40.7	0.06	22	38.2	43.2	albedo: 0.079	MPC · JPL
2014 QU_{441}	18 August 2014	Dark Energy Survey (W84)	121	cubewano (hot)?	41.5	0.11	19	36.9	46.0	albedo: 0.079 taxonomy: IR	MPC · JPL
2014 QU_{495}	18 August 2014	DECam (W84)	96	res · 4:7	43.7	0.27	21	32.2	55.3	albedo: 0.126	MPC · JPL
2014 QU_{510}	22 August 2014	DECam (W84)	196	cubewano (hot)?	40.9	0.05	42	38.9	43.0	albedo: 0.079	MPC · JPL
2014 QU_{562}	19 August 2014	DECam (W84)	67	res · 4:7	44.0	0.25	26	33.1	54.8	albedo: 0.126	MPC · JPL
2014 QV_{495}	19 August 2014	DECam (W84)	152	SDO	79.9	0.55	23	36.3	123.5	albedo: 0.124	MPC · JPL
2014 QV_{510}	18 August 2014	DECam (W84)	123	cubewano (hot)?	43.2	0.15	32	36.7	49.8	albedo: 0.079	MPC · JPL
2014 QV_{562}	19 August 2014	DECam (W84)	116	cubewano (hot)?	42.1	0.18	26	34.7	49.6	albedo: 0.079	MPC · JPL
2014 QW_{495}	29 August 2014	DECam (W84)	103	SDO	131.9	0.74	29	33.7	230.2	albedo: 0.124	MPC · JPL
2014 QW_{562}	19 August 2014	DECam (W84)	96	SDO	49.4	0.24	20	37.5	61.3	albedo: 0.124	MPC · JPL
2014 QX_{510}	18 August 2014	DECam (W84)	181	cubewano (hot)	45.7	0.14	7	39.1	52.2	albedo: 0.079 taxonomy: IR	MPC · JPL
2014 QX_{562}	19 August 2014	DECam (W84)	120	cubewano (hot)?	42.2	0.14	26	36.3	48.0	albedo: 0.079	MPC · JPL
2014 QY_{510}	19 August 2014	DECam (W84)	126	cubewano (hot)?	43.0	0.17	23	35.6	50.4	albedo: 0.079 taxonomy: RR	MPC · JPL
2014 QY_{562}	19 August 2014	DECam (W84)	215	cubewano (hot)?	45.8	0.15	27	38.9	52.7	albedo: 0.079	MPC · JPL
2014 QZ_{510}	19 August 2014	DECam (W84)	136	plutino	39.5	0.24	24	30.0	49.0	albedo: 0.074 taxonomy: IR	MPC · JPL
2014 QZ_{562}	20 August 2014	DECam (W84)	140	cubewano (hot)?	41.2	0.13	28	35.7	46.7	albedo: 0.079	MPC · JPL
2014 RH_{70}	4 September 2014	DECam (W84)	114	other TNO	38.1	0.12	28	33.5	42.7	albedo: 0.13 taxonomy: RR	MPC · JPL
2014 RJ_{70}	12 September 2014	DECam (W84)	179	cubewano (hot)?	46.7	0.19	27	38.0	55.4	albedo: 0.079	MPC · JPL
2014 RK_{86}	11 September 2014	DECam (W84)	125	centaur	374.8	0.94	26	22.0	727.5	albedo: 0.058	MPC · JPL
2014 RL_{74}	15 September 2014	DECam (W84)	312	cubewano (hot)?	47.0	0.21	30	37.2	56.8	albedo: 0.079	MPC · JPL
2014 RL_{86}	15 September 2014	DECam (W84)	145	SDO	122.9	0.69	29	37.8	208.0	albedo: 0.124	MPC · JPL
2014 RM_{74}	4 September 2014	DECam (W84)	147	res · 3:10	67.8	0.36	33	43.3	92.2	albedo: 0.126	MPC · JPL
2014 RM_{86}	4 September 2014	DECam (W84)	118	cubewano (hot)?	43.3	0.19	19	35.3	51.3	albedo: 0.079	MPC · JPL
2014 RN_{74}	4 September 2014	DECam (W84)	132	plutino	39.6	0.29	24	28.0	51.2	albedo: 0.074	MPC · JPL
2014 RO_{74}	4 September 2014	DECam (W84)	121	nep trj	30.2	0.05	30	28.8	31.6	albedo: 0.058	MPC · JPL
2014 RO_{86}	3 September 2014	DECam (W84)	136	cubewano (hot)?	41.9	0.12	29	36.9	46.9	albedo: 0.079	MPC · JPL
2014 RP_{86}	4 September 2014	DECam (W84)	113	SDO	70.6	0.50	25	35.1	106.1	albedo: 0.124	MPC · JPL
2014 RQ_{86}	4 September 2014	DECam (W84)	91	other TNO	38.5	0.02	31	37.9	39.1	albedo: 0.13	MPC · JPL
2014 RR_{86}	4 September 2014	DECam (W84)	94	other TNO	38.2	0.08	36	35.1	41.2	albedo: 0.13	MPC · JPL
2014 RS_{63}	4 September 2014	DECam (W84)	165	SDO	59.1	0.37	29	37.2	81.0	albedo: 0.124	MPC · JPL
2014 RS_{86}	4 September 2014	DECam (W84)	173	cubewano (hot)?	47.0	0.22	25	36.8	57.3	albedo: 0.079	MPC · JPL
2014 RT_{86}	4 September 2014	DECam (W84)	101	other TNO	47.2	0.25	31	35.6	58.8	albedo: 0.13	MPC · JPL
2014 RU_{86}	4 September 2014	DECam (W84)	186	plutino	39.6	0.22	30	31.0	48.2	albedo: 0.074	MPC · JPL
2014 RV_{86}	4 September 2014	DECam (W84)	96	res · 1:8	121.9	0.68	29	39.3	204.6	albedo: 0.126	MPC · JPL
2014 RW_{86}	4 September 2014	DECam (W84)	95	plutino	39.5	0.20	23	31.4	47.6	albedo: 0.074	MPC · JPL
2014 RX_{86}	4 September 2014	DECam (W84)	134	cubewano (hot)?	45.5	0.18	27	37.5	53.6	albedo: 0.079	MPC · JPL
2014 RY_{86}	12 September 2014	DECam (W84)	110	cubewano (hot)?	42.6	0.18	28	34.8	50.3	albedo: 0.079	MPC · JPL
2014 SA_{365}	20 September 2014	Pan-STARRS 1 (F51)	165	other TNO	40.9	0.11	28	36.5	45.2	albedo: 0.13	MPC · JPL
2014 SA_{374}	27 September 2014	DECam (W84)	194	cubewano (hot)?	43.9	0.12	36	38.7	49.1	albedo: 0.079	MPC · JPL
2014 SA_{404}	25 September 2014	DECam (W84)	90	twotino?	48.4	0.25	21	36.3	60.4	albedo: 0.126	MPC · JPL
2014 SB_{350}	19 September 2014	Cerro Tololo Observatory, La Serena (807)	122	other TNO	48.9	0.30	21	34.3	63.6	albedo: 0.13	MPC · JPL
2014 SB_{374}	20 September 2014	DECam (W84)	198	cubewano (hot)?	44.4	0.18	41	36.6	52.3	albedo: 0.079	MPC · JPL
2014 SB_{404}	25 September 2014	DECam (W84)	121	plutino	39.6	0.11	22	35.4	43.7	albedo: 0.074	MPC · JPL
2014 SC_{350}	21 September 2014	Cerro Tololo Observatory, La Serena (807)	200	cubewano (hot)	45.6	0.08	9	41.8	49.4	albedo: 0.079	MPC · JPL
2014 SC_{374}	25 September 2014	DECam (W84)	129	nep trj	30.2	0.09	34	27.4	33.1	albedo: 0.058	MPC · JPL
2014 SC_{404}	25 September 2014	DECam (W84)	79	plutino	39.7	0.25	27	29.8	49.6	albedo: 0.074	MPC · JPL
2014 SD_{350}	22 September 2014	Cerro Tololo Observatory, La Serena (807)	146	res · 1:3?	62.3	0.38	33	38.7	85.9	albedo: 0.126	MPC · JPL
2014 SD_{403}	19 September 2014	DECam (W84)	96	res · 1:7?	109.5	0.66	26	37.1	182.0	albedo: 0.126	MPC · JPL
2014 SD_{404}	25 September 2014	DECam (W84)	68	res · 3:4	36.6	0.20	23	29.3	43.8	albedo: 0.126	MPC · JPL
2014 SE_{350}	22 September 2014	Cerro Tololo Observatory, La Serena (807)	157	SDO	50.4	0.28	24	36.4	64.3	albedo: 0.124	MPC · JPL
2014 SE_{404}	27 September 2014	DECam (W84)	118	SDO	74.5	0.40	42	44.6	104.4	albedo: 0.124	MPC · JPL
2014 SF_{350}	22 September 2014	Cerro Tololo Observatory, La Serena (807)	226	plutino	39.5	0.24	10	29.8	49.1	albedo: 0.074	MPC · JPL
2014 SF_{378}	22 September 2014	Cerro Tololo Observatory, La Serena (807)	204	cubewano (hot)?	46.0	0.16	15	38.4	53.5	albedo: 0.079	MPC · JPL
2014 SF_{404}	30 September 2014	DECam (W84)	111	cubewano (hot)?	41.5	0.15	29	35.3	47.7	albedo: 0.079	MPC · JPL
2014 SG_{350}	19 September 2014	Cerro Tololo Observatory, La Serena (807)	161	other TNO	52.7	0.24	27	40.0	65.3	albedo: 0.13	MPC · JPL
2014 SG_{378}	21 September 2014	Cerro Tololo Observatory, La Serena (807)	173	SDO	83.7	0.54	22	38.5	128.8	albedo: 0.124	MPC · JPL
2014 SG_{404}	30 September 2014	DECam (W84)	100	SDO	78.8	0.51	32	39.0	118.6	albedo: 0.124	MPC · JPL
2014 SH_{350}	19 September 2014	Cerro Tololo Observatory, La Serena (807)	143	cubewano (hot)?	44.0	0.18	10	36.3	51.7	albedo: 0.079	MPC · JPL
2014 SH_{378}	22 September 2014	DECam (W84)	157	cubewano (hot)?	41.1	0.07	17	38.1	44.1	albedo: 0.079	MPC · JPL
2014 SH_{404}	30 September 2014	DECam (W84)	117	SDO	68.2	0.45	28	37.6	98.9	albedo: 0.124	MPC · JPL
2014 SJ_{350}	21 September 2014	Cerro Tololo Observatory, La Serena (807)	147	other TNO	43.8	0.28	11	31.4	56.2	albedo: 0.13	MPC · JPL
2014 SJ_{404}	30 September 2014	DECam (W84)	92	plutino?	39.4	0.24	24	30.1	48.7	albedo: 0.074	MPC · JPL
2014 SK_{350}	21 September 2014	Cerro Tololo Observatory, La Serena (807)	168	other TNO	54.9	0.27	17	40.0	69.9	albedo: 0.13	MPC · JPL
2014 SK_{404}	27 September 2014	DECam (W84)	90	res · 1:3	63.0	0.42	26	36.7	89.3	albedo: 0.126	MPC · JPL
2014 SL_{350}	21 September 2014	Cerro Tololo Observatory, La Serena (807)	104	SDO	48.0	0.16	9	40.5	55.6	albedo: 0.124	MPC · JPL
2014 SL_{403}	20 September 2014	DECam (W84)	117	res · 4:7	43.5	0.14	35	37.3	49.8	albedo: 0.126	MPC · JPL
2014 SL_{404}	22 September 2014	DECam (W84)	145	cubewano (hot)?	41.8	0.07	26	38.9	44.7	albedo: 0.079	MPC · JPL
2014 SM_{350}	21 September 2014	Cerro Tololo Observatory, La Serena (807)	157	cubewano (hot)?	45.0	0.23	36	34.8	55.2	albedo: 0.079	MPC · JPL
2014 SM_{363}	17 September 2014	DECam (W84)	205	cubewano (hot)?	42.0	0.12	23	37.0	47.0	albedo: 0.079	MPC · JPL
2014 SM_{373}	30 September 2014	DECam (W84)	156	cubewano (hot)?	45.7	0.16	25	38.2	53.2	albedo: 0.079	MPC · JPL
2014 SN_{350}	25 September 2014	DECam (W84)	144	cubewano (hot)?	43.1	0.19	32	34.7	51.5	albedo: 0.079	MPC · JPL
2014 SN_{363}	17 September 2014	DECam (W84)	174	cubewano (hot)?	44.9	0.19	27	36.4	53.5	albedo: 0.079 taxonomy: BR	MPC · JPL
2014 SN_{373}	30 September 2014	DECam (W84)	168	SDO	105.6	0.65	32	37.5	173.6	albedo: 0.124	MPC · JPL
2014 SN_{403}	16 September 2014	DECam (W84)	197	SDO	130.9	0.70	31	39.3	222.6	albedo: 0.124	MPC · JPL
2014 SO_{350}	30 September 2014	DECam (W84)	101	res · 1:4	76.6	0.55	24	34.6	118.7	albedo: 0.126	MPC · JPL
2014 SO_{363}	17 September 2014	DECam (W84)	153	cubewano (hot)?	41.9	0.10	23	37.7	46.1	albedo: 0.079	MPC · JPL
2014 SO_{373}	25 September 2014	DECam (W84)	188	cubewano (hot)?	41.9	0.13	26	36.6	47.3	albedo: 0.079 taxonomy: BB	MPC · JPL
2014 SP_{363}	17 September 2014	DECam (W84)	215	SDO	62.8	0.32	31	42.7	82.9	albedo: 0.124 taxonomy: IR	MPC · JPL
2014 SP_{373}	25 September 2014	DECam (W84)	200	plutino	39.8	0.33	25	26.8	52.8	albedo: 0.074 taxonomy: BR	MPC · JPL
2014 SQ_{350}	24 September 2014	DECam (W84)	183	cubewano (hot)?	43.2	0.11	30	38.7	47.8	albedo: 0.079	MPC · JPL
2014 SQ_{373}	24 September 2014	DECam (W84)	181	cubewano (hot)?	46.4	0.16	30	38.8	53.9	albedo: 0.079	MPC · JPL
2014 SQ_{403}	20 September 2014	DECam (W84)	198	res · 1:10?	141.5	0.67	44	46.7	236.4	albedo: 0.126	MPC · JPL
2014 SR349	19 September 2014	Cerro Tololo Observatory, La Serena (807)	193	EDDO	304.1	0.84	18	47.4	560.8	albedo: 0.124	MPC · JPL
2014 SR_{350}	26 September 2014	DECam (W84)	188	SDO	100.4	0.63	29	36.9	163.9	albedo: 0.124	MPC · JPL
2014 SR_{373}	20 September 2014	DECam (W84)	112	res · 1:3	63.0	0.39	36	38.6	87.5	albedo: 0.126	MPC · JPL
2014 SR_{403}	24 September 2014	DECam (W84)	211	res · 2:5	55.4	0.42	28	32.0	78.9	albedo: 0.126	MPC · JPL
2014 SR_{404}	26 September 2014	DECam (W84)	162	cubewano (hot)?	46.1	0.15	31	39.2	53.0	albedo: 0.079	MPC · JPL
2014 SS_{349}	22 September 2014	Cerro Tololo Observatory, La Serena (807)	118	SDO	145.5	0.69	48	45.4	245.7	albedo: 0.124	MPC · JPL
2014 SS_{373}	30 September 2014	DECam (W84)	194	SDO	58.0	0.35	30	37.6	78.3	albedo: 0.124 taxonomy: RR	MPC · JPL
2014 SS_{403}	24 September 2014	DECam (W84)	150	cubewano (hot)?	45.2	0.13	26	39.1	51.2	albedo: 0.079	MPC · JPL
2014 ST_{349}	18 September 2014	Cerro Tololo Observatory, La Serena (807)	172	cubewano (hot)?	46.8	0.17	14	38.7	54.9	albedo: 0.079	MPC · JPL
2014 ST_{363}	21 September 2014	DECam (W84)	—	—	45.2	0.24	32	34.5	55.9	—	MPC · JPL
2014 ST373	25 September 2014	DECam (W84)	304	SDO	106.3	0.53	43	50.2	162.5	albedo: 0.124	MPC · JPL
2014 ST_{403}	24 September 2014	DECam (W84)	105	other TNO	47.8	0.15	30	40.6	55.0	albedo: 0.13	MPC · JPL
2014 SU_{349}	18 September 2014	Cerro Tololo Observatory, La Serena (807)	200	centaur	92.9	0.69	24	28.7	157.2	albedo: 0.058	MPC · JPL
2014 SU_{373}	30 September 2014	DECam (W84)	111	res · 2:5	55.7	0.40	28	33.3	78.0	albedo: 0.126	MPC · JPL
2014 SU_{403}	24 September 2014	DECam (W84)	141	other TNO	58.2	0.17	44	48.3	68.2	albedo: 0.13	MPC · JPL
2014 SV_{349}	19 September 2014	Cerro Tololo Observatory, La Serena (807)	360	SDO	61.1	0.44	18	34.5	87.8	albedo: 0.124	MPC · JPL
2014 SV_{363}	21 September 2014	DECam (W84)	—	—	109.8	0.67	19	36.6	183.0	—	MPC · JPL
2014 SV_{373}	30 September 2014	DECam (W84)	177	res · 2:5	55.6	0.33	11	37.2	73.9	albedo: 0.126	MPC · JPL
2014 SV_{403}	25 September 2014	DECam (W84)	150	cubewano (hot)?	46.0	0.16	29	38.8	53.2	albedo: 0.079	MPC · JPL
2014 SW_{349}	19 September 2014	Cerro Tololo Observatory, La Serena (807)	119	SDO	96.3	0.59	15	39.2	153.5	albedo: 0.124	MPC · JPL
2014 SW_{373}	25 September 2014	DECam (W84)	144	res · 2:5?	56.1	0.36	21	36.1	76.0	albedo: 0.126	MPC · JPL
2014 SW_{403}	25 September 2014	DECam (W84)	108	cubewano (hot)?	42.6	0.18	35	34.8	50.5	albedo: 0.079	MPC · JPL
2014 SW_{434}	22 September 2014	COIAS, Subaru Telescope (T09)	70	cubewano (hot)?	43.9	0.11	10	39.3	48.5	albedo: 0.079	MPC · JPL
2014 SX_{349}	19 September 2014	Cerro Tololo Observatory, La Serena (807)	149	twotino	48.4	0.31	12	33.3	63.5	albedo: 0.126	MPC · JPL
2014 SX_{373}	20 September 2014	DECam (W84)	135	cubewano (hot)?	43.2	0.17	33	35.9	50.4	albedo: 0.079	MPC · JPL
2014 SX_{403}	25 September 2014	DECam (W84)	146	ESDO	376.6	0.91	43	35.6	717.7	albedo: 0.124	MPC · JPL
2014 SX_{434}	18 September 2014	COIAS, Subaru Telescope (T09)	104	SDO	58.4	0.47	24	31.1	85.7	albedo: 0.124	MPC · JPL
2014 SY_{349}	22 September 2014	Cerro Tololo Observatory, La Serena (807)	143	SDO	80.0	0.56	16	34.9	125.1	albedo: 0.124	MPC · JPL
2014 SY_{373}	27 September 2014	DECam (W84)	154	other TNO	38.9	0.07	26	36.2	41.5	albedo: 0.13	MPC · JPL
2014 SY_{403}	25 September 2014	DECam (W84)	126	SDO	52.0	0.30	29	36.3	67.8	albedo: 0.124	MPC · JPL
2014 SY_{434}	22 September 2014	COIAS, Subaru Telescope (T09)	88	other TNO	57.1	0.49	11	29.3	85.0	albedo: 0.13	MPC · JPL
2014 SZ_{348}	20 September 2014	Dark Energy Survey (W84)	95	SDO	49.1	0.26	48	36.4	61.9	albedo: 0.124	MPC · JPL
2014 SZ_{349}	22 September 2014	Cerro Tololo Observatory, La Serena (807)	125	SDO	80.3	0.54	36	36.7	123.8	albedo: 0.124	MPC · JPL
2014 SZ_{373}	25 September 2014	DECam (W84)	140	SDO	113.6	0.68	30	36.7	190.4	albedo: 0.124	MPC · JPL
2014 SZ_{403}	25 September 2014	DECam (W84)	122	cubewano (hot)?	42.9	0.13	30	37.4	48.4	albedo: 0.079	MPC · JPL
2014 TA_{115}	2 October 2014	DECam (W84)	93	res · 3:5	42.5	0.11	7	38.0	47.0	albedo: 0.126	MPC · JPL
2014 TA_{116}	3 October 2014	DECam (W84)	128	cubewano (hot)?	45.5	0.17	27	37.8	53.3	albedo: 0.079	MPC · JPL
2014 TB_{116}	3 October 2014	DECam (W84)	105	SDO	80.3	0.55	28	36.0	124.6	albedo: 0.124	MPC · JPL
2014 TB_{86}	1 October 2014	Pan-STARRS 1 (F51)	227	cubewano (hot)?	45.7	0.18	19	37.5	53.9	albedo: 0.079 taxonomy: BB	MPC · JPL
2014 TC_{115}	2 October 2014	DECam (W84)	123	SDO	54.9	0.30	10	38.5	71.4	albedo: 0.124	MPC · JPL
2014 TD_{115}	3 October 2014	DECam (W84)	135	cubewano (hot)?	46.0	0.21	14	36.4	55.5	albedo: 0.079	MPC · JPL
2014 TD_{116}	2 October 2014	DECam (W84)	152	cubewano (hot)	46.5	0.20	9	37.3	55.8	albedo: 0.079	MPC · JPL
2014 TE_{86}	2 October 2014	DECam (W84)	189	cubewano (hot)?	44.5	0.15	29	37.7	51.4	albedo: 0.079	MPC · JPL
2014 TF_{116}	2 October 2014	DECam (W84)	184	res · 3:5	42.1	0.23	4	32.3	52.0	albedo: 0.126	MPC · JPL
2014 TF_{86}	1 October 2014	DECam (W84)	167	other TNO	40.3	0.08	32	37.1	43.6	albedo: 0.13	MPC · JPL
2014 TG_{115}	2 October 2014	DECam (W84)	193	cubewano (hot)	45.4	0.11	11	40.3	50.4	albedo: 0.079	MPC · JPL
2014 TH_{115}	2 October 2014	DECam (W84)	94	plutino	39.5	0.16	8	33.2	45.9	albedo: 0.074	MPC · JPL
2014 TJ_{115}	3 October 2014	DECam (W84)	68	res · 3:4	36.6	0.05	20	34.7	38.5	albedo: 0.126	MPC · JPL
2014 TK_{115}	2 October 2014	DECam (W84)	103	plutino	39.5	0.23	12	30.4	48.6	albedo: 0.074	MPC · JPL
2014 TL_{115}	2 October 2014	DECam (W84)	109	twotino	47.9	0.26	29	35.3	60.5	albedo: 0.126	MPC · JPL
2014 TL_{95}	1 October 2014	DECam (W84)	102	res · 4:7	43.8	0.19	11	35.4	52.2	albedo: 0.126	MPC · JPL
2014 TM_{95}	1 October 2014	DECam (W84)	94	res · 3:4	36.7	0.19	18	29.7	43.7	albedo: 0.126	MPC · JPL
2014 TO_{115}	1 October 2014	DECam (W84)	119	SDO	62.4	0.38	19	39.0	85.8	albedo: 0.124	MPC · JPL
2014 TP_{115}	1 October 2014	DECam (W84)	84	SDO	56.1	0.32	12	38.0	74.1	albedo: 0.124	MPC · JPL
2014 TQ_{115}	2 October 2014	DECam (W84)	87	res · 3:5	42.6	0.25	13	32.1	53.0	albedo: 0.126	MPC · JPL
2014 TR_{115}	2 October 2014	DECam (W84)	181	res · 4:7	43.6	0.14	7	37.5	49.8	albedo: 0.126	MPC · JPL
2014 TS_{100}	3 October 2014	DECam (W84)	141	SDO	65.6	0.44	29	36.6	94.7	albedo: 0.124	MPC · JPL
2014 TS_{115}	2 October 2014	DECam (W84)	83	SDO	183.6	0.81	18	34.9	332.3	albedo: 0.124	MPC · JPL
2014 TT_{100}	1 October 2014	DECam (W84)	107	SDO	86.8	0.61	23	34.0	139.7	albedo: 0.124	MPC · JPL
2014 TT_{115}	2 October 2014	DECam (W84)	218	twotino	47.8	0.15	9	40.6	55.0	albedo: 0.126	MPC · JPL
2014 TT_{85}	2 October 2014	Dark Energy Survey (W84)	88	other TNO	40.7	0.08	18	37.5	44.0	albedo: 0.13	MPC · JPL
2014 TU_{115}	2 October 2014	DECam (W84)	101	ESDO	360.2	0.90	24	35.0	685.4	albedo: 0.124	MPC · JPL
2014 TU_{85}	13 October 2014	Dark Energy Survey (W84)	70	twotino	47.8	0.28	16	34.4	61.2	albedo: 0.126	MPC · JPL
2014 TV_{115}	3 October 2014	DECam (W84)	140	cubewano (hot)?	40.9	0.09	23	37.2	44.6	albedo: 0.079	MPC · JPL
2014 TW_{115}	3 October 2014	DECam (W84)	140	cubewano (hot)?	41.9	0.07	23	38.9	44.9	albedo: 0.079	MPC · JPL
2014 TX_{115}	3 October 2014	DECam (W84)	224	cubewano (hot)?	45.9	0.11	29	40.7	51.2	albedo: 0.079	MPC · JPL
2014 TY_{114}	2 October 2014	DECam (W84)	153	cubewano (hot)?	43.9	0.03	17	42.8	45.0	albedo: 0.079	MPC · JPL
2014 TY_{115}	3 October 2014	DECam (W84)	93	SDO	81.4	0.54	26	37.5	125.4	albedo: 0.124	MPC · JPL
2014 TZ_{115}	3 October 2014	DECam (W84)	133	other TNO	41.7	0.25	26	31.3	52.2	albedo: 0.13	MPC · JPL
2014 UA_{229}	22 October 2014	Outer Solar System Origins Survey (568)	29	centaur	35.3	0.38	31	21.9	48.7	albedo: 0.058	MPC · JPL
2014 UA_{230}	22 October 2014	Outer Solar System Origins Survey (568)	188	res · 2:5	55.6	0.23	13	42.6	68.6	albedo: 0.126	MPC · JPL
2014 UA_{277}	28 October 2014	DECam (W84)	127	cubewano (hot)	47.0	0.17	7	39.0	55.1	albedo: 0.079	MPC · JPL
2014 UB_{225}	28 October 2014	DECam (W84)	193	cubewano (cold)	43.9	0.06	4	41.4	46.4	albedo: 0.152	MPC · JPL
2014 UB_{228}	22 October 2014	Outer Solar System Origins Survey (568)	95	SDO	57.3	0.33	7	38.2	76.4	albedo: 0.124	MPC · JPL
2014 UB_{229}	22 October 2014	Outer Solar System Origins Survey (568)	107	plutino	39.7	0.26	4	29.4	50.0	albedo: 0.074	MPC · JPL
2014 UB_{230}	22 October 2014	Outer Solar System Origins Survey (568)	81	SDO	50.0	0.28	12	35.9	64.1	albedo: 0.124	MPC · JPL
2014 UB_{277}	29 October 2014	DECam (W84)	98	res · 2:7	69.9	0.47	8	36.7	103.0	albedo: 0.126	MPC · JPL
2014 UC_{225}	28 October 2014	DECam (W84)	117	res · 4:5	35.3	0.12	5	31.0	39.5	albedo: 0.126 taxonomy: RR	MPC · JPL
2014 UC_{228}	22 October 2014	Outer Solar System Origins Survey (568)	150	cubewano (hot)	45.1	0.05	6	42.9	47.4	albedo: 0.079	MPC · JPL
2014 UC_{229}	22 October 2014	Outer Solar System Origins Survey (568)	82	cubewano (cold)	45.7	0.11	4	40.7	50.7	albedo: 0.152	MPC · JPL
2014 UC_{230}	22 October 2014	Outer Solar System Origins Survey (568)	82	cubewano (cold)	45.3	0.12	2	39.9	50.6	albedo: 0.152	MPC · JPL
2014 UD_{228}	22 October 2014	Outer Solar System Origins Survey (568)	227	SDO	55.0	0.33	7	37.0	72.9	albedo: 0.124	MPC · JPL
2014 UD_{229}	22 October 2014	Outer Solar System Origins Survey (568)	67	res · 3:4	36.6	0.15	7	31.1	42.1	albedo: 0.126	MPC · JPL
2014 UD_{241}	28 October 2014	DECam (W84)	179	cubewano (hot)	42.4	0.05	13	40.2	44.7	albedo: 0.079 taxonomy: IR	MPC · JPL
2014 UE_{228}	22 October 2014	Outer Solar System Origins Survey (568)	78	res · 3:8	58.5	0.41	9	34.6	82.3	albedo: 0.126	MPC · JPL
2014 UE_{229}	22 October 2014	Outer Solar System Origins Survey (568)	124	cubewano (hot)	43.1	0.04	6	41.4	44.8	albedo: 0.079	MPC · JPL
2014 UE_{241}	28 October 2014	DECam (W84)	233	cubewano (hot)?	42.6	0.13	8	37.3	47.9	albedo: 0.079	MPC · JPL
2014 UE_{278}	21 October 2014	DECam (W84)	121	other TNO	50.3	0.22	22	39.5	61.1	albedo: 0.13	MPC · JPL
2014 UF_{224}	26 October 2014	Dark Energy Survey (W84)	146	cubewano (hot)?	45.6	0.13	27	39.9	51.3	albedo: 0.079	MPC · JPL
2014 UF_{228}	22 October 2014	Outer Solar System Origins Survey (568)	129	plutino	39.8	0.23	13	30.8	48.8	albedo: 0.074	MPC · JPL
2014 UF_{229}	22 October 2014	Outer Solar System Origins Survey (568)	78	res · 7:10	38.3	0.09	19	34.8	41.8	albedo: 0.126	MPC · JPL
2014 UF_{241}	21 October 2014	DECam (W84)	219	cubewano (hot)?	41.6	0.16	27	35.1	48.1	albedo: 0.079	MPC · JPL
2014 UF_{277}	20 October 2014	DECam (W84)	172	cubewano (hot)?	42.7	0.03	37	41.4	44.0	albedo: 0.079	MPC · JPL
2014 UG_{228}	22 October 2014	Outer Solar System Origins Survey (568)	99	SDO	55.4	0.32	4	37.9	72.8	albedo: 0.124	MPC · JPL
2014 UG_{277}	21 October 2014	DECam (W84)	123	cubewano (hot)?	40.3	0.05	20	38.5	42.1	albedo: 0.079	MPC · JPL
2014 UH_{225}	22 October 2014	Outer Solar System Origins Survey (568)	119	other TNO	38.8	0.04	30	37.4	40.1	albedo: 0.13	MPC · JPL
2014 UH_{228}	22 October 2014	Outer Solar System Origins Survey (568)	49	twotino	47.9	0.33	3	32.2	63.6	albedo: 0.126	MPC · JPL
2014 UH_{229}	22 October 2014	Outer Solar System Origins Survey (568)	103	cubewano (hot)	44.2	0.08	8	40.7	47.7	albedo: 0.079	MPC · JPL
2014 UH_{277}	21 October 2014	DECam (W84)	203	plutino	39.4	0.28	8	28.2	50.6	albedo: 0.074	MPC · JPL
2014 UJ_{228}	22 October 2014	Outer Solar System Origins Survey (568)	99	cubewano (hot)?	43.1	0.10	14	38.8	47.4	albedo: 0.079	MPC · JPL
2014 UJ_{229}	22 October 2014	Outer Solar System Origins Survey (568)	114	cubewano (hot)?	41.6	0.10	21	37.4	45.8	albedo: 0.079	MPC · JPL
2014 UJ_{277}	21 October 2014	DECam (W84)	178	cubewano (hot)	43.4	0.08	14	39.8	47.1	albedo: 0.079	MPC · JPL
2014 UK_{228}	22 October 2014	Outer Solar System Origins Survey (568)	118	SDO	58.5	0.36	8	37.5	79.6	albedo: 0.124	MPC · JPL
2014 UK_{229}	22 October 2014	Outer Solar System Origins Survey (568)	68	cubewano (cold)	42.9	0.07	2	39.9	45.8	albedo: 0.152	MPC · JPL
2014 UK_{231}	22 October 2014	Maunakea (568)	113	cubewano (hot)	44.0	0.07	7	41.0	46.9	albedo: 0.079	MPC · JPL
2014 UK_{277}	21 October 2014	DECam (W84)	113	SDO	53.5	0.28	18	38.6	68.4	albedo: 0.124	MPC · JPL
2014 UL_{228}	22 October 2014	Outer Solar System Origins Survey (568)	113	cubewano (hot)	46.8	0.15	5	40.0	53.7	albedo: 0.079	MPC · JPL
2014 UL_{229}	22 October 2014	Outer Solar System Origins Survey (568)	86	cubewano (cold)	42.8	0.10	3	38.7	46.9	albedo: 0.152	MPC · JPL
2014 UL_{277}	21 October 2014	DECam (W84)	180	twotino	47.9	0.10	21	43.0	52.8	albedo: 0.126	MPC · JPL
2014 UM_{228}	22 October 2014	Outer Solar System Origins Survey (568)	45	plutino	39.6	0.30	5	27.9	51.2	albedo: 0.074	MPC · JPL
2014 UM_{229}	22 October 2014	Outer Solar System Origins Survey (568)	74	res · 4:7	43.9	0.14	4	37.9	49.9	albedo: 0.126	MPC · JPL
2014 UM_{233}	22 October 2014	Maunakea (568)	117	cubewano (hot)?	47.0	0.23	12	36.4	57.6	albedo: 0.079	MPC · JPL
2014 UM_{271}	24 October 2014	Maunakea (568)	114	SDO	82.4	0.58	35	34.6	130.2	albedo: 0.124	MPC · JPL
2014 UM_{277}	23 October 2014	DECam (W84)	109	SDO	72.5	0.50	4	36.5	108.5	albedo: 0.124	MPC · JPL
2014 UN_{225}	22 October 2014	DECam (W84)	293	SDO	59.1	0.35	53	38.6	79.6	albedo: 0.124	MPC · JPL
2014 UN_{228}	22 October 2014	Outer Solar System Origins Survey (568)	150	cubewano (hot)?	46.2	0.18	24	37.9	54.4	albedo: 0.079	MPC · JPL
2014 UN_{229}	22 October 2014	Outer Solar System Origins Survey (568)	94	cubewano (hot)	42.4	0.07	8	39.3	45.5	albedo: 0.079	MPC · JPL
2014 UN_{250}	23 October 2014	DECam (W84)	106	other TNO	40.8	0.05	29	39.0	42.6	albedo: 0.13	MPC · JPL
2014 UN_{277}	23 October 2014	DECam (W84)	112	cubewano (cold)	42.6	0.02	3	41.9	43.4	albedo: 0.152	MPC · JPL
2014 UO_{224}	25 October 2014	Pan-STARRS 1 (F51)	258	res · 3:5?	42.5	0.12	7	37.5	47.4	albedo: 0.126	MPC · JPL
2014 UO_{228}	22 October 2014	Outer Solar System Origins Survey (568)	77	plutino	39.7	0.12	7	34.8	44.6	albedo: 0.074	MPC · JPL
2014 UO_{229}	22 October 2014	Outer Solar System Origins Survey (568)	102	plutino	39.6	0.16	10	33.2	46.0	albedo: 0.074	MPC · JPL
2014 UO_{231}	22 October 2014	Outer Solar System Origins Survey (568)	82	res · 2:5?	55.7	0.24	23	42.3	69.2	albedo: 0.126	MPC · JPL
2014 UO_{250}	23 October 2014	DECam (W84)	150	cubewano (hot)?	42.1	0.10	28	37.7	46.4	albedo: 0.079	MPC · JPL
2014 UO_{277}	23 October 2014	DECam (W84)	74	res · 3:4	36.6	0.11	12	32.7	40.6	albedo: 0.126	MPC · JPL
2014 UP_{228}	22 October 2014	Outer Solar System Origins Survey (568)	103	cubewano (cold)	42.6	0.13	3	37.1	48.1	albedo: 0.152	MPC · JPL
2014 UP_{229}	22 October 2014	Outer Solar System Origins Survey (568)	136	cubewano (hot)?	45.9	0.18	6	37.7	54.0	albedo: 0.079	MPC · JPL
2014 UP_{250}	28 October 2014	DECam (W84)	220	SDO	52.4	0.36	21	33.4	71.3	albedo: 0.124 taxonomy: IR	MPC · JPL
2014 UP_{277}	27 October 2014	DECam (W84)	62	other TNO	48.7	0.33	37	32.6	64.8	albedo: 0.13	MPC · JPL
2014 UQ_{228}	22 October 2014	Outer Solar System Origins Survey (568)	82	cubewano (cold)	43.8	0.12	4	38.5	49.1	albedo: 0.152	MPC · JPL
2014 UQ_{229}	22 October 2014	Outer Solar System Origins Survey (568)	66	centaur	49.9	0.78	6	11.1	88.7	albedo: 0.058	MPC · JPL
2014 UQ_{250}	31 October 2014	DECam (W84)	112	res · 2:5	55.9	0.36	32	35.6	76.2	albedo: 0.126	MPC · JPL
2014 UQ_{277}	28 October 2014	DECam (W84)	124	other TNO	44.1	0.29	23	31.1	57.0	albedo: 0.13	MPC · JPL
2014 UR_{228}	22 October 2014	Outer Solar System Origins Survey (568)	89	plutino?	39.1	0.10	9	35.2	43.1	albedo: 0.074	MPC · JPL
2014 UR_{229}	22 October 2014	Outer Solar System Origins Survey (568)	71	cubewano (cold)	43.3	0.03	4	42.3	44.4	albedo: 0.152	MPC · JPL
2014 UR_{277}	28 October 2014	DECam (W84)	130	cubewano (hot)?	41.5	0.14	32	35.9	47.1	albedo: 0.079	MPC · JPL
2014 US_{228}	22 October 2014	Outer Solar System Origins Survey (568)	108	twotino	48.1	0.32	7	32.5	63.6	albedo: 0.126	MPC · JPL
2014 US_{229}	22 October 2014	Outer Solar System Origins Survey (568)	82	res · 2:5	55.7	0.40	4	33.3	78.1	albedo: 0.126	MPC · JPL
2014 US_{277}	28 October 2014	DECam (W84)	441	SDO	100.5	0.46	36	54.6	146.4	albedo: 0.124	MPC · JPL
2014 UT_{228}	22 October 2014	Outer Solar System Origins Survey (568)	118	cubewano (cold)	49.0	0.10	3	44.3	53.8	albedo: 0.152	MPC · JPL
2014 UT_{229}	22 October 2014	Outer Solar System Origins Survey (568)	89	plutino	39.6	0.13	43	34.4	44.8	albedo: 0.074	MPC · JPL
2014 UT_{277}	29 October 2014	DECam (W84)	219	cubewano (hot)	42.7	0.06	6	40.1	45.4	albedo: 0.079	MPC · JPL
2014 UU_{228}	22 October 2014	Outer Solar System Origins Survey (568)	56	plutino	39.9	0.30	4	27.9	52.0	albedo: 0.074	MPC · JPL
2014 UU_{229}	22 October 2014	Outer Solar System Origins Survey (568)	71	plutino	39.7	0.22	7	30.9	48.5	albedo: 0.074	MPC · JPL
2014 UU_{240}	29 October 2014	DECam (W84)	131	nep trj	30.2	0.05	36	28.7	31.7	albedo: 0.058	MPC · JPL
2014 UU_{277}	29 October 2014	DECam (W84)	112	cubewano (hot)?	46.1	0.20	28	37.1	55.2	albedo: 0.079	MPC · JPL
2014 UV_{228}	22 October 2014	Outer Solar System Origins Survey (568)	93	plutino	39.7	0.23	10	30.6	48.8	albedo: 0.074	MPC · JPL
2014 UV_{229}	22 October 2014	Outer Solar System Origins Survey (568)	75	SDO	73.2	0.50	28	36.3	110.1	albedo: 0.124	MPC · JPL
2014 UV_{277}	29 October 2014	DECam (W84)	96	SDO	61.7	0.40	34	37.2	86.2	albedo: 0.124	MPC · JPL
2014 UW_{228}	22 October 2014	Outer Solar System Origins Survey (568)	54	res · 3:4	36.6	0.13	5	31.9	41.2	albedo: 0.126	MPC · JPL
2014 UW_{229}	22 October 2014	Outer Solar System Origins Survey (568)	147	twotino	47.9	0.17	15	39.7	56.1	albedo: 0.126	MPC · JPL
2014 UW_{276}	29 October 2014	DECam (W84)	80	plutino	39.5	0.29	13	28.1	50.9	albedo: 0.074	MPC · JPL
2014 UX_{228}	22 October 2014	Outer Solar System Origins Survey (568)	116	res · 3:4	36.5	0.16	21	30.5	42.4	albedo: 0.126	MPC · JPL
2014 UX_{276}	28 October 2014	DECam (W84)	159	cubewano (hot)	45.3	0.12	9	40.1	50.5	albedo: 0.079	MPC · JPL
2014 UX_{277}	31 October 2014	DECam (W84)	150	SDO	92.1	0.59	32	38.3	145.9	albedo: 0.124	MPC · JPL
2014 UY_{224}	21 October 2014	DECam (W84)	86	centaur	133.5	0.85	26	20.4	246.7	albedo: 0.058	MPC · JPL
2014 UY_{228}	22 October 2014	Outer Solar System Origins Survey (568)	85	cubewano (cold)	43.5	0.06	3	41.1	46.0	albedo: 0.152	MPC · JPL
2014 UY_{229}	22 October 2014	Outer Solar System Origins Survey (568)	149	twotino	47.8	0.21	3	37.6	58.0	albedo: 0.126	MPC · JPL
2014 UY_{276}	23 October 2014	DECam (W84)	74	res · 2:5	55.7	0.43	24	31.8	79.5	albedo: 0.126	MPC · JPL
2014 UY_{277}	28 October 2014	DECam (W84)	105	other TNO	39.0	0.11	38	34.8	43.2	albedo: 0.13	MPC · JPL
2014 UZ224	21 October 2014	DECam (W84)	635	SDO	109.8	0.65	27	38.5	181.1	albedo: 0.131	MPC · JPL
2014 UZ_{228}	22 October 2014	Outer Solar System Origins Survey (568)	85	plutino	39.8	0.22	3	31.1	48.5	albedo: 0.074	MPC · JPL
2014 UZ_{229}	22 October 2014	Outer Solar System Origins Survey (568)	108	cubewano (hot)	41.8	0.05	12	39.9	43.7	albedo: 0.079	MPC · JPL
2014 UZ_{276}	23 October 2014	DECam (W84)	132	cubewano (hot)	46.1	0.17	9	38.4	53.7	albedo: 0.079	MPC · JPL
2014 VB_{41}	14 November 2014	DECam (W84)	126	SDO	53.7	0.32	18	36.5	70.9	albedo: 0.124	MPC · JPL
2014 VC_{41}	4 November 2014	DECam (W84)	128	centaur	37.9	0.24	47	28.8	47.0	albedo: 0.058 taxonomy: RR	MPC · JPL
2014 VK_{43}	14 November 2014	DECam (W84)	169	cubewano (hot)	43.9	0.06	10	41.1	46.6	albedo: 0.079	MPC · JPL
2014 VL_{43}	13 November 2014	DECam (W84)	114	cubewano (cold)	42.7	0.07	5	39.6	45.8	albedo: 0.152	MPC · JPL
2014 VM_{43}	13 November 2014	DECam (W84)	136	SDO	108.8	0.70	17	32.9	184.7	albedo: 0.124	MPC · JPL
2014 VN_{43}	13 November 2014	DECam (W84)	106	res · 3:4	36.4	0.13	15	31.7	41.1	albedo: 0.126	MPC · JPL
2014 VO_{43}	3 November 2014	DECam (W84)	174	cubewano (hot)?	44.1	0.05	40	42.0	46.3	albedo: 0.079	MPC · JPL
2014 VP_{43}	15 November 2014	DECam (W84)	135	SDO	133.8	0.69	36	40.9	226.7	albedo: 0.124	MPC · JPL
2014 VT_{37}	12 November 2014	Dark Energy Survey (W84)	74	plutino	39.7	0.24	33	30.4	49.1	albedo: 0.074	MPC · JPL
2014 VV_{39}	14 November 2014	DECam (W84)	169	cubewano (cold)	44.0	0.02	2	43.3	44.8	albedo: 0.152 taxonomy: IR	MPC · JPL
2014 VW_{37}	12 November 2014	DECam (W84)	181	cubewano (hot)?	42.3	0.14	49	36.6	48.0	albedo: 0.079 taxonomy: BB	MPC · JPL
2014 WA_{556}	21 November 2014	DECam (W84)	228	res · 1:3?	62.8	0.37	24	39.8	85.8	albedo: 0.126	MPC · JPL
2014 WA_{602}	18 November 2014	DECam (W84)	152	cubewano (hot)?	45.9	0.11	31	40.7	51.2	albedo: 0.079	MPC · JPL
2014 WA_{626}	28 November 2014	COIAS, Subaru Telescope (T09)	—	—	35.3	0.18	17	29.0	41.6	—	MPC · JPL
2014 WB_{510}	17 November 2014	Pan-STARRS 1 (F51)	140	plutino	39.8	0.24	13	30.4	49.2	albedo: 0.074	MPC · JPL
2014 WB_{536}	26 November 2014	Pan-STARRS 1 (F51)	120	centaur	60.7	0.56	7	26.5	94.9	albedo: 0.058	MPC · JPL
2014 WB_{556}	21 November 2014	DECam (W84)	135	EDDO	284.5	0.85	24	42.8	526.2	albedo: 0.124	MPC · JPL
2014 WB_{602}	18 November 2014	DECam (W84)	101	res · 4:7	43.6	0.14	30	37.5	49.7	albedo: 0.126	MPC · JPL
2014 WB_{626}	28 November 2014	COIAS, Subaru Telescope (T09)	—	—	53.4	0.56	26	23.8	83.0	—	MPC · JPL
2014 WC_{509}	17 November 2014	Pan-STARRS 1 (F51)	185	plutino	39.8	0.26	9	29.5	50.2	albedo: 0.074	MPC · JPL
2014 WC_{536}	28 November 2014	Pan-STARRS 1 (F51)	162	plutino	39.5	0.20	22	31.8	47.3	albedo: 0.074 taxonomy: BB	MPC · JPL
2014 WC_{556}	16 November 2014	DECam (W84)	152	cubewano (hot)?	46.0	0.08	36	42.1	49.8	albedo: 0.079	MPC · JPL
2014 WC_{602}	18 November 2014	DECam (W84)	94	other TNO	38.9	0.12	29	34.3	43.5	albedo: 0.13	MPC · JPL
2014 WD_{536}	27 November 2014	DECam (W84)	135	plutino	39.6	0.25	17	29.6	49.7	albedo: 0.074 taxonomy: IR	MPC · JPL
2014 WD_{556}	21 November 2014	DECam (W84)	81	SDO	77.2	0.59	31	31.6	122.7	albedo: 0.124	MPC · JPL
2014 WD_{602}	18 November 2014	DECam (W84)	134	cubewano (hot)?	43.1	0.22	39	33.5	52.7	albedo: 0.079	MPC · JPL
2014 WD_{624}	28 November 2014	COIAS, Subaru Telescope (T09)	—	—	56.5	0.44	27	31.8	81.2	—	MPC · JPL
2014 WD_{626}	25 November 2014	COIAS, Subaru Telescope (T09)	—	—	88.2	0.73	27	23.4	152.9	—	MPC · JPL
2014 WE_{510}	21 November 2014	Pan-STARRS 1 (F51)	125	plutino	39.8	0.32	27	27.1	52.5	albedo: 0.074	MPC · JPL
2014 WE_{556}	18 November 2014	DECam (W84)	106	SDO	67.0	0.45	31	36.6	97.3	albedo: 0.124	MPC · JPL
2014 WE_{602}	18 November 2014	DECam (W84)	95	SDO	79.2	0.49	49	40.4	118.0	albedo: 0.124	MPC · JPL
2014 WF_{602}	21 November 2014	DECam (W84)	108	SDO	109.0	0.64	40	39.1	179.0	albedo: 0.124	MPC · JPL
2014 WF_{626}	—	—	—	—	45.6	0.20	23	36.5	54.7	—	MPC · JPL
2014 WG_{602}	21 November 2014	DECam (W84)	155	cubewano (hot)?	41.7	0.07	24	38.9	44.5	albedo: 0.079	MPC · JPL
2014 WH_{602}	21 November 2014	DECam (W84)	73	other TNO	38.1	0.14	27	33.0	43.3	albedo: 0.13	MPC · JPL
2014 WJ_{517}	23 November 2014	Maunakea (568)	—	—	56.0	0.40	20	33.6	78.5	—	MPC · JPL
2014 WJ_{602}	21 November 2014	DECam (W84)	161	res · 3:7	53.0	0.33	24	35.8	70.3	albedo: 0.126	MPC · JPL
2014 WK_{510}	26 November 2014	Pan-STARRS 1 (F51)	147	SDO	50.3	0.31	11	34.6	65.9	albedo: 0.124	MPC · JPL
2014 WL_{517}	23 November 2014	Maunakea (568)	75	SDO	60.7	0.41	25	36.1	85.3	albedo: 0.124	MPC · JPL
2014 WL_{602}	21 November 2014	DECam (W84)	133	cubewano (hot)?	41.0	0.02	23	40.0	41.9	albedo: 0.079	MPC · JPL
2014 WL_{616}	29 November 2014	Pan-STARRS 1 (F51)	320	cubewano (hot)?	47.1	0.19	25	38.4	55.9	albedo: 0.079	MPC · JPL
2014 WM_{509}	24 November 2014	Pan-STARRS 1 (F51)	166	res · 3:5	42.5	0.12	24	37.3	47.8	albedo: 0.126	MPC · JPL
2014 WM_{510}	26 November 2014	Pan-STARRS 1 (F51)	162	SDO	79.1	0.59	20	32.1	126.1	albedo: 0.124	MPC · JPL
2014 WM_{517}	23 November 2014	Maunakea (568)	114	twotino	47.9	0.06	20	44.9	50.9	albedo: 0.126	MPC · JPL
2014 WM_{602}	27 November 2014	DECam (W84)	131	cubewano (hot)?	47.2	0.14	36	40.5	53.8	albedo: 0.079	MPC · JPL
2014 WN_{510}	26 November 2014	Pan-STARRS 1 (F51)	186	SDO	76.5	0.52	12	37.0	116.1	albedo: 0.124	MPC · JPL
2014 WO_{510}	27 November 2014	Pan-STARRS 1 (F51)	183	plutino	39.7	0.19	7	32.2	47.2	albedo: 0.074	MPC · JPL
2014 WR_{510}	28 November 2014	Pan-STARRS 1 (F51)	153	plutino	39.7	0.27	11	28.9	50.5	albedo: 0.074	MPC · JPL
2014 WS_{509}	19 November 2014	Pan-STARRS 1 (F51)	190	cubewano (cold)	44.6	0.04	3	42.7	46.6	albedo: 0.152	MPC · JPL
2014 WS_{625}	25 November 2014	COIAS, Subaru Telescope (T09)	—	—	53.8	0.28	18	39.0	68.6	—	MPC · JPL
2014 WT_{625}	28 November 2014	COIAS, Subaru Telescope (T09)	—	—	48.4	0.10	28	43.6	53.2	—	MPC · JPL
2014 WU_{625}	28 November 2014	COIAS, Subaru Telescope (T09)	—	—	53.1	0.20	25	42.6	63.5	—	MPC · JPL
2014 WV_{625}	28 November 2014	COIAS, Subaru Telescope (T09)	—	—	88.3	0.62	24	33.7	143.0	—	MPC · JPL
2014 WW_{509}	26 November 2014	Pan-STARRS 1 (F51)	410	cubewano (hot)?	42.9	0.13	20	37.5	48.3	albedo: 0.079	MPC · JPL
2014 WW_{625}	28 November 2014	COIAS, Subaru Telescope (T09)	—	—	37.5	0.10	28	33.6	41.3	—	MPC · JPL
2014 WX_{601}	16 November 2014	DECam (W84)	172	plutino	39.7	0.14	11	34.3	45.1	albedo: 0.074	MPC · JPL
2014 WX_{625}	25 November 2014	COIAS, Subaru Telescope (T09)	—	—	96.7	0.59	27	39.3	154.1	—	MPC · JPL
2014 WY_{555}	16 November 2014	DECam (W84)	135	SDO	55.0	0.36	38	35.2	74.9	albedo: 0.124	MPC · JPL
2014 WY_{601}	17 November 2014	DECam (W84)	108	SDO	49.5	0.29	33	35.4	63.7	albedo: 0.124	MPC · JPL
2014 WY_{625}	28 November 2014	COIAS, Subaru Telescope (T09)	—	—	64.0	0.16	29	53.5	74.5	—	MPC · JPL
2014 WZ_{555}	16 November 2014	DECam (W84)	185	cubewano (hot)?	46.0	0.21	32	36.4	55.7	albedo: 0.079	MPC · JPL
2014 WZ_{601}	18 November 2014	DECam (W84)	113	SDO	94.1	0.62	28	35.9	152.4	albedo: 0.124	MPC · JPL
2014 WZ_{625}	28 November 2014	COIAS, Subaru Telescope (T09)	—	—	66.2	0.40	27	39.8	92.6	—	MPC · JPL
2014 XA_{48}	12 December 2014	DECam (W84)	176	cubewano (hot)?	46.8	0.20	27	37.3	56.4	albedo: 0.079	MPC · JPL
2014 XB_{48}	12 December 2014	DECam (W84)	130	res · 2:7	70.1	0.52	28	33.9	106.2	albedo: 0.126 taxonomy: BB	MPC · JPL
2014 XC_{48}	12 December 2014	DECam (W84)	167	cubewano (hot)?	41.5	0.13	28	35.9	47.0	albedo: 0.079 taxonomy: IR	MPC · JPL
2014 XR_{54}	12 December 2014	DECam (W84)	101	SDO	65.1	0.47	29	34.3	95.9	albedo: 0.124	MPC · JPL
2014 XS_{3}	8 December 2014	Pan-STARRS 1 (F51)	6	damocloid	74.0	0.96	102	3.3	144.8	albedo: 0.048	MPC · JPL
2014 XS_{54}	12 December 2014	DECam (W84)	100	other TNO	47.2	0.22	29	36.8	57.5	albedo: 0.13	MPC · JPL
2014 XT_{54}	15 December 2014	DECam (W84)	183	plutino	39.3	0.20	38	31.5	47.1	albedo: 0.074	MPC · JPL
2014 XU_{54}	15 December 2014	DECam (W84)	113	SDO	65.9	0.46	32	35.5	96.3	albedo: 0.124	MPC · JPL
2014 XW_{40}	1 December 2014	Pan-STARRS 1 (F51)	215	SDO	50.3	0.31	17	34.6	66.0	albedo: 0.124	MPC · JPL
2014 XW_{47}	1 December 2014	DECam (W84)	135	res · 4:7	43.7	0.29	28	31.1	56.3	albedo: 0.126	MPC · JPL
2014 XX_{47}	12 December 2014	DECam (W84)	145	SDO	51.9	0.31	27	35.8	68.1	albedo: 0.124	MPC · JPL
2014 XY_{40}	15 December 2014	DECam (W84)	475	cubewano (hot)?	47.3	0.15	29	40.4	54.3	albedo: 0.079 taxonomy: RR	MPC · JPL
2014 XY_{47}	12 December 2014	DECam (W84)	136	other TNO	38.1	0.08	26	35.3	41.0	albedo: 0.13	MPC · JPL
2014 XZ_{40}	1 December 2014	DECam (W84)	149	cubewano (hot)?	40.1	0.06	45	37.6	42.5	albedo: 0.079	MPC · JPL
2014 XZ_{47}	13 December 2014	DECam (W84)	159	cubewano (hot)?	46.3	0.24	33	35.3	57.2	albedo: 0.079	MPC · JPL
2014 YA_{50}	25 December 2014	Pan-STARRS 1 (F51)	595	cubewano (hot)?	46.5	0.17	24	38.6	54.4	albedo: 0.079	MPC · JPL
2014 YA_{92}	16 December 2014	DECam (W84)	93	other TNO	38.8	0.03	34	37.6	39.9	albedo: 0.13	MPC · JPL
2014 YB_{92}	16 December 2014	DECam (W84)	102	nep trj	30.3	0.10	31	27.2	33.4	albedo: 0.058	MPC · JPL
2014 YC_{92}	16 December 2014	DECam (W84)	364	SDO	64.4	0.50	32	32.1	96.6	albedo: 0.124	MPC · JPL
2014 YD_{100}	18 December 2014	Pan-STARRS 1 (F51)	122	plutino	39.9	0.30	25	27.9	52.0	albedo: 0.074	MPC · JPL
2014 YD_{92}	16 December 2014	DECam (W84)	168	SDO	75.6	0.36	36	48.6	102.5	albedo: 0.124	MPC · JPL
2014 YE_{92}	17 December 2014	DECam (W84)	116	SDO	66.4	0.44	27	37.2	95.6	albedo: 0.124	MPC · JPL
2014 YF_{92}	17 December 2014	DECam (W84)	190	cubewano (hot)?	43.5	0.12	30	38.2	48.8	albedo: 0.079	MPC · JPL
2014 YG_{92}	22 December 2014	DECam (W84)	117	twotino	47.8	0.19	27	38.7	57.0	albedo: 0.126	MPC · JPL
2014 YH_{92}	23 December 2014	DECam (W84)	85	other TNO	38.8	0.08	30	35.9	41.8	albedo: 0.13	MPC · JPL
2014 YJ_{92}	26 December 2014	DECam (W84)	89	res · 4:7	43.8	0.30	33	30.8	56.7	albedo: 0.126	MPC · JPL
2014 YK_{92}	23 December 2014	DECam (W84)	175	cubewano (hot)?	40.0	0.07	55	37.4	42.6	albedo: 0.079	MPC · JPL
2014 YL_{50}	16 December 2014	DECam (W84)	148	res · 2:5	55.8	0.33	29	37.5	74.0	albedo: 0.126	MPC · JPL
2014 YQ_{99}	31 December 2014	DECam (W84)	151	SDO	59.1	0.42	11	34.5	83.6	albedo: 0.124	MPC · JPL
2014 YR_{72}	20 December 2014	DECam (W84)	206	plutino	39.4	0.14	27	33.8	45.0	albedo: 0.074	MPC · JPL
2014 YS_{72}	20 December 2014	DECam (W84)	84	SDO	55.5	0.42	24	32.1	78.8	albedo: 0.124	MPC · JPL
2014 YT_{72}	16 December 2014	DECam (W84)	164	cubewano (hot)?	45.0	0.18	32	36.8	53.1	albedo: 0.079	MPC · JPL
2014 YU_{72}	23 December 2014	DECam (W84)	169	cubewano (hot)?	46.6	0.15	30	39.9	53.4	albedo: 0.079	MPC · JPL
2014 YW_{91}	16 December 2014	DECam (W84)	132	cubewano (hot)?	41.0	0.16	24	34.5	47.6	albedo: 0.079	MPC · JPL
2014 YX_{91}	23 December 2014	DECam (W84)	80	SDO	53.8	0.35	63	34.8	72.8	albedo: 0.124	MPC · JPL
2014 YZ_{91}	16 December 2014	DECam (W84)	90	twotino	48.1	0.27	30	35.0	61.2	albedo: 0.126	MPC · JPL

back to top
