= (523692) 2014 EZ51 =

Rapidly rotating scattered-disc object

(523692) 2014 EZ_{51}
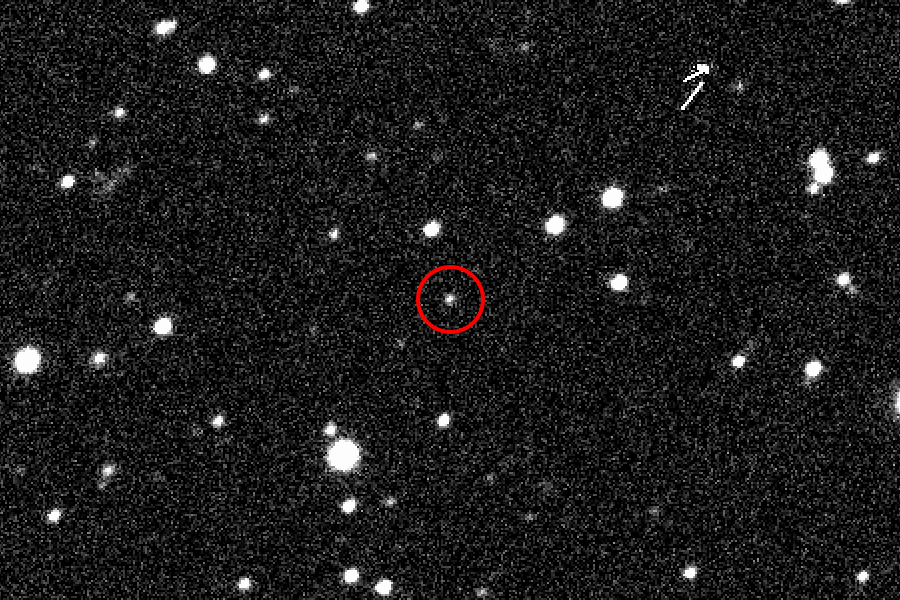
- 2014 EZ_{51} imaged by the Dark Energy Survey in March 2017

Discovery
- Discovered by: Pan-STARRS 1
- Discovery site: Haleakala Obs.
- Discovery date: 18 April 2010

Designations
- Minor planet category: TNO; SDO distant Res 9:4

Orbital characteristics(barycentric) (Note: These orbital elements are expressed in terms of the Solar System Barycenter (SSB) as the frame of reference. Due to planetary perturbations, the Sun revolves around the SSB at non-negligible distances, so heliocentric-frame orbital elements and distances (such as those given in JPL's Small-Body Database) can vary on short timescales.)
- Epoch 5 May 2025 (JD 2460800.5)
- Uncertainty parameter 2
- Observation arc: 14.22 yr (5,193 d)
- Aphelion: 64.369 AU
- Perihelion: 40.663 AU
- Semi-major axis: 52.516 AU
- Eccentricity: 0.2257
- Orbital period (sidereal): 380.58 yr (139,010 d)
- Mean anomaly: 267.37°
- Mean motion: 0° 0^{m} 9.36^{s} / day
- Inclination: 10.252°
- Longitude of ascending node: 27.503°
- Argument of perihelion: 329.67°
- Known satellites: 0

Physical characteristics
- Mean diameter: >575 km (occultation); 626 km (calculated from assumed albedo)
- Mass: 6.0438664×10^{20} kg (assumed)
- Synodic rotation period: 3.200±0.002 h
- Geometric albedo: 0.11 (assumed) <0.03
- Absolute magnitude (H): 3.86; 3.85

(523692) 2014 EZ_{51} is a large trans-Neptunian object in the scattered disc, approximately 600 kilometres (400 miles) in diameter. It was discovered on 18 April 2010, by the Pan-STARRS 1 survey at Haleakala Observatory, Hawaii, United States.

2014 EZ_{51} also has a very short rotation period of only 3.2 hours, making it shorter than that of the dwarf planet Haumea, which has a rotation period of about 3.92 hours.

2014 EZ_{51} has not yet been imaged by high-resolution telescopes, so it has no known moons. The Hubble Space Telescope is planned to image 2014 EZ_{51} in 2026, which should determine if it has significantly sized moons.

== Observational history ==
=== Discovery ===
2014 EZ_{51} was discovered on 28 April 2014, by the DECam at Coquimbo Region, Chile. with precovery observations back to 18 April 2010 by the Pan-STARRS 1 survey at Haleakala Observatory, Hawaii, United States.

=== Occultation ===
An occultation by 2014 EZ_{51} occurred in New Zealand on 25 February 2019.

== Numbering and naming ==
This minor planet was numbered by the Minor Planet Center on 25 September 2018 (M.P.C. 111779). As of January 2026, it has not been named.

== Orbit and classification ==
2014 EZ_{51} orbits the Sun at a distance of 40.7–64.4 AU once every 380.5 years (139,010 days; semi-major axis of 52.5 AU). Its orbit has an eccentricity of 0.23 and an inclination of 10° with respect to the ecliptic. The body's observation arc begins with its official discovery observation at Haleakala in April 2010. 2014 EZ_{51} is also in a 9:4 resonance with Neptune, where every 9 orbits Neptune does, 2014 EZ_{51} does 4.

=== Orbital stability ===
In a 2021 study by Muñoz-Gutiérrez et al., they simulated the orbit of 34 dwarf planet candidates, over 1 billion years (1 Gyr). where 2014 EZ_{51} was one of them. Over 1 billion years, its orbit is "Stable", and its diffusion time is 129.356 Gyr, making it "Very Stable".

== Physical characteristics ==
=== Size and albedo ===
A size and color comparison with 134340 Pluto and 2014 EZ_{51} with multiple estimates as shown to the sides of the largest estimate.

According to Michael Brown, he estimated that 2014 EZ_{51} could measure 626 kilometres (389 miles) kilometers in diameter, using an assumed albedo of 0.11, but he does use an outdated absolute magnitude of 4.1, not the newer 3.86, nor 3.85. On 25 February 2019, a stellar occultation by 2014 EZ_{51} was observed in New Zealand. From these observations, a lower limit of 575 kilometres (357 miles) was placed on its mean diameter, with another website yielding a equatorial diameter of at least 1,260 kilometres (780 miles) based on the same occultation event. Assuming that the >1260 km occultation model is correct, then its geometric albedo must be less than 0.03.

2014 EZ_{51}’s mass is unmeasured, due to not having a known moon as of 2026. However, Muñoz-Gutiérrez et al. estimated that 2014 EZ_{51} has a mass of 0.1012×10^{−3} earth mass (6.0438664×10^{20} kg)

==== No known atmosphere ====
According to the website that said its diameter is over 1260 km, they show they did not detect any atmosphere around 2014 EZ_{51}.

=== Rotation ===
In 2023, a study on photometric observations of trans-Neptunian objects by the Kepler space telescope found that 2014 EZ_{51} rotates rapidly, and that it completes a rotation once every 3.200±0.002 hours on its axis while exhibiting a light curve amplitude of 0.145±0.026 magnitudes, which indicates its shape must be elongated.
