= 768325 Geyagugv =

Extreme trans-Neptunian object

- Discovery image of Geyagugv from the Dark Energy Survey on 17 January 2015

Discovery
- Discovered by: Dark Energy Survey
- Discovery site: Cerro Tololo Obs.
- Discovery date: 17 January 2015

Designations
- Pronunciation: /ɡeɪˈjɑːɡuːɡə/; Cherokee: [ɡejaɡuɡə̃]
- Named after: Geyagugv (ᎨᏯᎫᎬ)
- Alternative designations: 2015 BP_{519}; "Caju" (nickname) (Note: The nickname "Caju" is mentioned in the downloadable PowerPoint presentation "Evaluating the Dynamical Stability of Outer Solar System Objects in the Presence of Planet Nine", by Juliette Becker, Fred Adams, Tali Khain, Stephanie Hamilton, and David Gerdes at University of Michigan.)
- Minor planet category: TNO · ESDO · ETNO distant

Orbital characteristics
- Epoch 9 June 2026 (JD 2461200.5)
- Uncertainty parameter 2
- Observation arc: 11.62 yr (4,243 d)
- Aphelion: 937.103 AU
- Perihelion: 35.295 AU
- Semi-major axis: 486.199 AU
- Eccentricity: 0.9274
- Orbital period (sidereal): 10720.868 yr (3,915,797 d)
- Mean anomaly: 358.917 °
- Mean motion: 0° 0^{m} 0.331^{s} / day
- Inclination: 54.082°
- Longitude of ascending node: 135.314°
- Time of perihelion: ≈ 31 August 2058 ±1 month
- Argument of perihelion: 347.760°
- Known satellites: 0

Physical characteristics
- Mean diameter: 524 km (est.); 516 km (est.); 400–700 km (est.); 719+309 −208 km (from assumed albedo)
- Geometric albedo: 0.08 (assumed); 0.124 (assumed); 0.07 to 0.21 (assumed); 0.057 (assumed)
- Spectral type: g–r = 0.79±0.17 r–i = 0.19±0.12 r–z = 0.42±0.15 i–z = 0.23±0.15 g–r =0.653±0.588 g–i = 0.581±0.622 g–z = 0.608±0.846
- Apparent magnitude: 21.5
- Absolute magnitude (H): 4.32

768325 Geyagugv (Note: The letter 'v' is a nasal vowel. See Cherokee orthography.) (provisional designation 2015 BP_{519}) is an extreme trans-Neptunian object from the scattered disc on a highly eccentric and inclined orbit in the outermost region of the Solar System. It has been described as an extended scattered disc object (ESDO), and fits into the group of extreme objects that led to the prediction of Planet Nine, and has the highest orbital inclination of any of these objects.

The diameter of Geyagugv is uncertain, but is expected to be somewhere between 400 to 700 km (250 to 430 mi).

== History ==
=== Discovery and observations ===
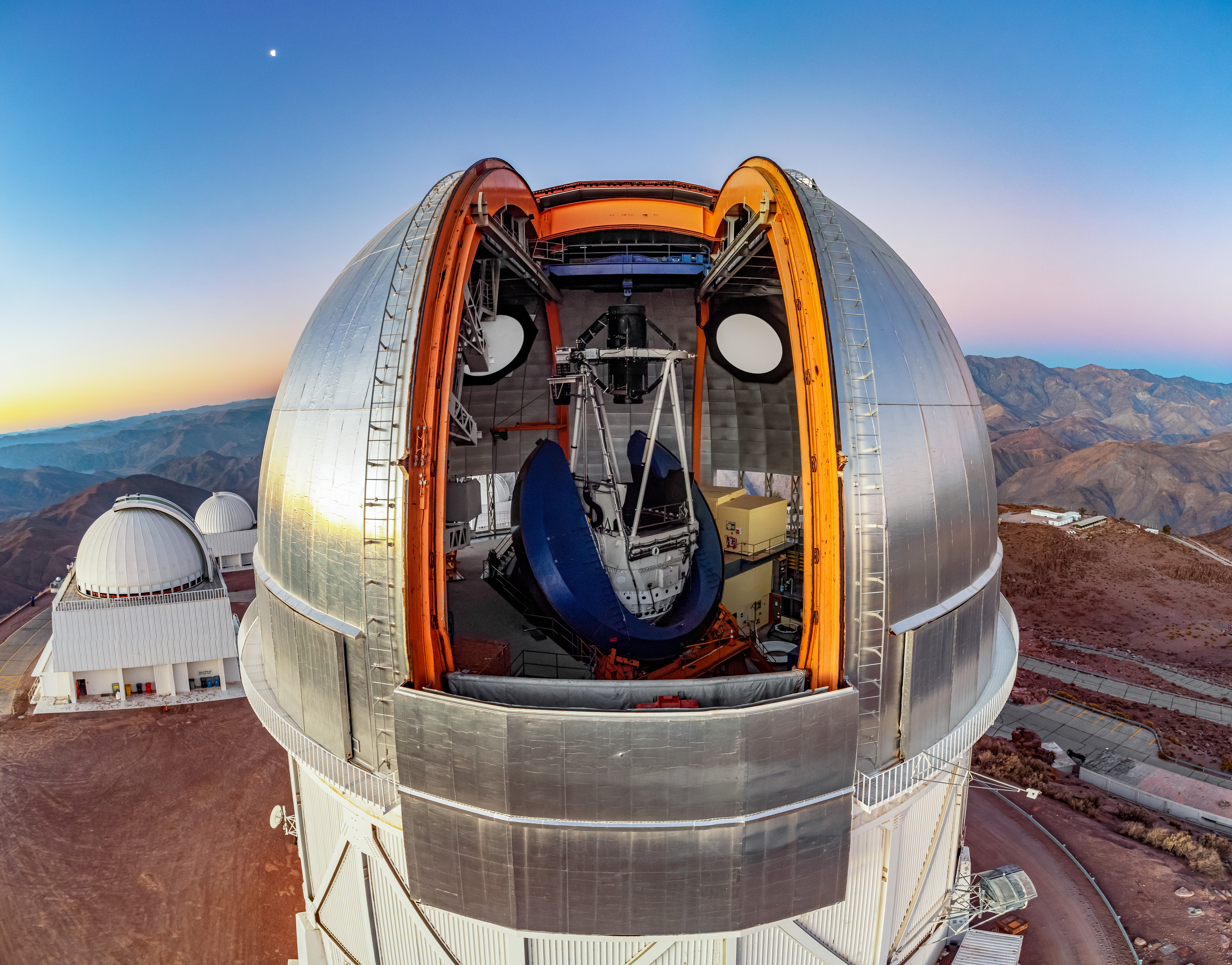
The 4.0-meter Víctor M. Blanco Telescope at Cerro Tololo Observatory, which houses the Dark Energy Camera (DECam)

Geyagugv was discovered on 17 January 2015, by astronomers with the Dark Energy Survey at Cerro Tololo Observatory (W84) in Chile. The body's observation arc begins with a precovery taken on 27 November 2014 by astronomers with the Dark Energy Survey using the DECam instrument of the Víctor M. Blanco Telescope at Cerro Tololo Inter-American Observatory in Chile. Its discovery was reported in a paper published by Dark Energy Survey astronomers in 2018.

=== Naming ===
This minor planet is named after Geyagugv (ᎨᏯᎫᎬ), a Cherokee metaphysical being that is called upon during prayer to aid in healing and wellbeing. According to the naming citation, Geyagugv resides in the highest level—the galvnati (ᎦᎸᎾᏘ [ɡalə̃ːnatʰi]) or sky-vault—and is one of the many messengers between the Cherokee people and the Creator. The astronomical object resides much of the time in the outermost regions of the Solar System but periodically travels in to the planets. The name was announced by the International Astronomical Union's Working Group for Small Body Nomenclature on 19 October 2026.

Before it was named, Geyagugv was previously known by its provisional designation 2015 BP_{519} or its internal nickname Caju. The nickname Caju (Note: The discoverers did not give an explanation for the name's use and meaning. It is possible that the nickname comes from the Portuguese word for cashew, caju.) was given by the Dark Energy Survey team when they announced the object's discovery in 2018.

== Orbit and classification ==
=== Orbital characteristics ===
Geyagugv orbits the Sun at a distance of 35.2–821 AU once every 8856 years (3,234,488 days; semi-major axis of 428 AU). Its orbit has an exceptionally high eccentricity of 0.92 and an inclination of 54° with respect to the ecliptic. This makes it a probable outlier among the known extreme trans-Neptunian objects. It has been described as an extended scattered disc object (ESDO).

=== Planet Nine hypothesis ===
Geyagugv fits into the group of extreme trans-Neptunian objects that originally led to the prediction of Planet Nine. The group consists of more than a dozen bodies with a perihelion greater than 30 AU and a semi-major axis greater than 250 AU, with Geyagugv having the highest orbital inclination of any of these objects. Subsequently, unrefereed work by de la Fuente Marcos (2018) found that Geyagugv's current orbital orientation in space is not easily explained by the same mechanism that keeps other extreme trans-Neptunian objects together, suggesting that the clustering in its orbital angles cannot be attributed to Planet Nine's influence. However, regardless of the current direction of its orbit, its high orbital inclination appears to fit into the class of high-semi major axis, high-inclination objects predicted by Batygin & Morbedelli (2017) to be generated by Planet Nine.

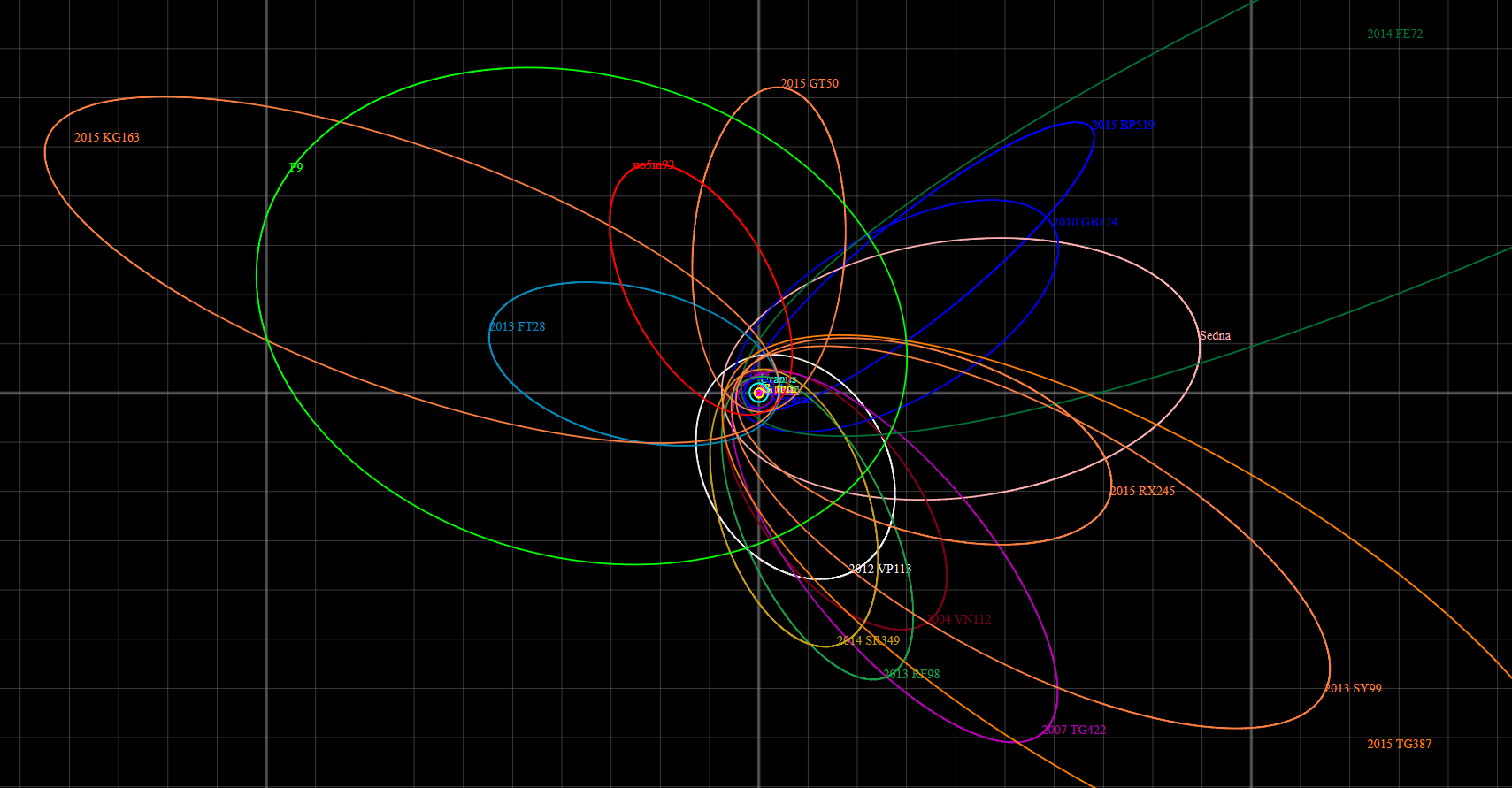
Orbit diagram of Geyagugv (2015 BP_{519}) and other extreme objects along with hypothetical Planet Nine (Geyagugv is the upper blue orbit, right over 2010 GB174's blue orbit)

This image shows the plot of eccentricity and perihelion of trans-Neptunian objects, colored by their main dynamical categories. Geyagugv is the pink circle shown at the top, left of 2017 OF201.

== Physical characteristics ==
=== Size and albedo ===
According to the original paper for the discovery of the object, its diameter is estimated to be 400 km to 700 km, using a albedo of 0.07 to 0.21. However, according to Michael Brown and Johnston's Archive, Geyagugv measures 524 and 516 kilometers in diameter based on an assumed albedo of 0.08 and 0.124, respectively. A newer 2025 study estimated its diameter at 719+309
−208 km assuming a median geometric albedo, which is bigger than previously thought. The albedo they assume is from a paper by Müller et al., which the albedo they assume is 0.057.

=== Spectra and surface ===
Geyagugv has color indices of: g-r 0.79±0.17, r-i 0.19±0.12, r-z 0.42±0.15 and i-z 0.23±0.15. The color of Geyagugv is moderately red. A newer study from 2025 shows that it has color indices of: g-r 0.653±0.588, g-i 0.581±0.622, and g-z of 0.608±0.846.

=== Upcoming observations ===
As of 2018, no rotational lightcurve of has been obtained from photometric observations. The body's rotation period, pole and shape remain unknown. It has not yet been imaged by high-resolution telescopes, so it has no known moons. The Hubble Space Telescope is planned to image Geyagugv in 2026, which should determine if it has significantly sized moons.

== See also ==
- Sedna
