= 2015 RX245 =

Highly eccentric detached trans-Neptunian object

2015 RX_{245}
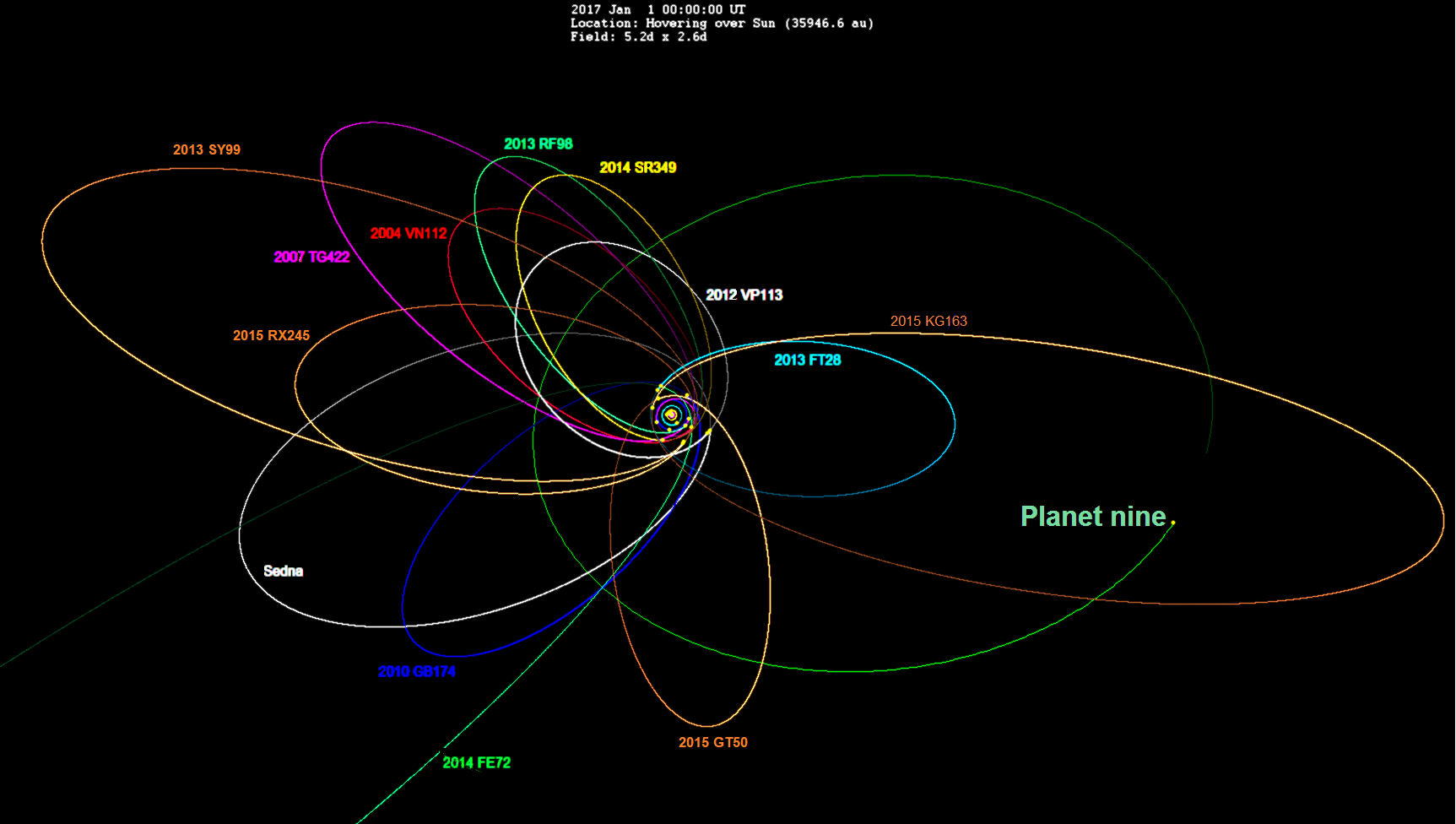
- Orbital diagram of 2015 RX_{245} and other objects along with hypothetical Planet Nine

Discovery
- Discovered by: (first observed only); OSSOS
- Discovery site: Mauna Kea Obs.
- Discovery date: 8 September 2015

Designations
- Alternative designations: o5t52
- Minor planet category: TNO · EDDO · ETNO distant

Orbital characteristics
- Epoch 27 April 2019 (JD 2458600.5)
- Uncertainty parameter 5
- Observation arc: 1.61 yr (587 d)
- Aphelion: 788.22 AU
- Perihelion: 45.563 AU
- Semi-major axis: 416.89 AU
- Eccentricity: 0.8907
- Orbital period (sidereal): 8512 yr (3,109,107 d)
- Mean anomaly: 358.03°
- Mean motion: 0° 0^{m} 0.36^{s} / day
- Inclination: 12.144°
- Longitude of ascending node: 8.5994°
- Argument of perihelion: 65.124°
- Neptune MOID: 17.5 AU

Physical characteristics
- Mean diameter: 245 km (est.); 255 km (est.)
- Geometric albedo: 0.08 (assumed); 0.09 (assumed)
- Absolute magnitude (H): 6.2

2015 RX_{245} is a detached trans-Neptunian object on a highly eccentric orbit in the outermost region of the Solar System. It measures approximately 250 kilometers (160 miles) in diameter. It was first observed on 8 September 2015, by astronomers with Outer Solar System Origins Survey using the 3.6-meter Canada–France–Hawaii Telescope at Mauna Kea Observatories, Hawaii, in the United States.

== Orbit and classification ==
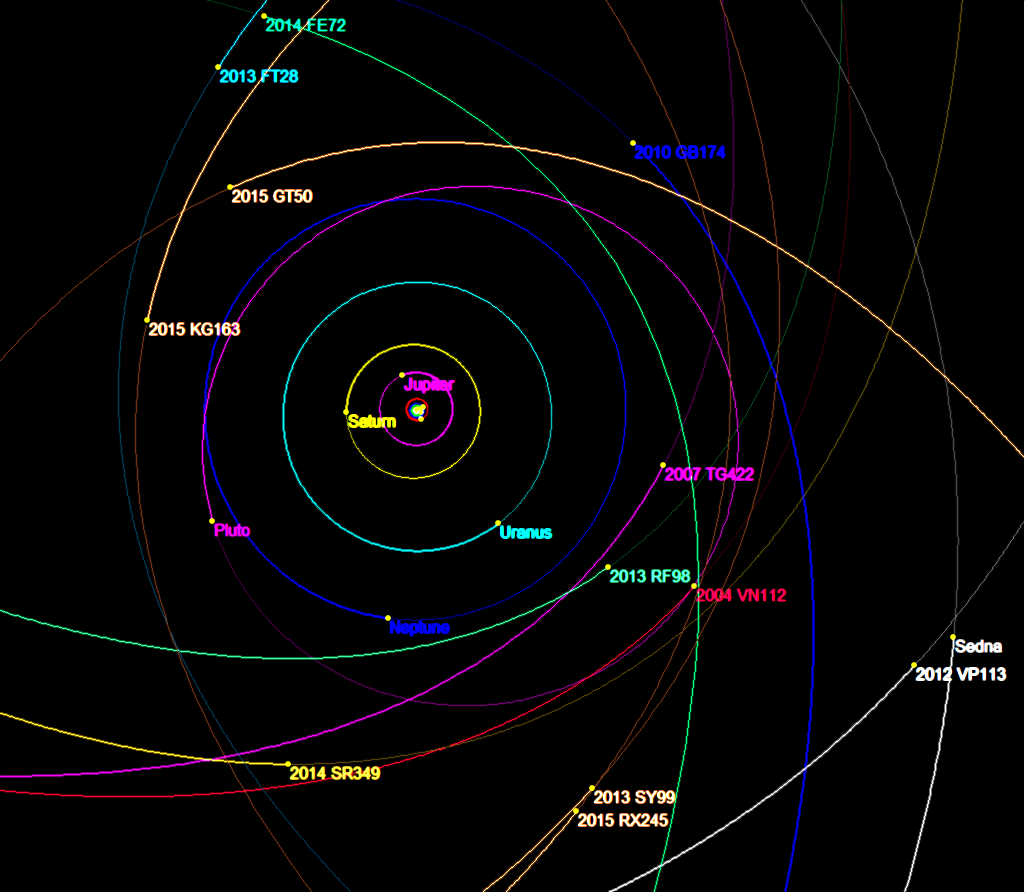
2015 RX_{245} has a similar size and orbit as 2013 SY99.

2015 RX_{245} belongs to a small group of detached objects with perihelion distances of 30 AU or more, and semi-major axes of 150 AU or more. These extreme trans-Neptunian objects (ETNOs) can not reach such orbits without some perturbing object, which leads to the speculation of Planet Nine. It is also denoted as an extended detached disc object or extreme distant detached object (EDDO).

It orbits the Sun at a distance of 45.6–788 AU once every 8512 years (3,109,107 days; semi-major axis of 417 AU). Its orbit has an exceptionally high eccentricity of 0.89 and an inclination of 12° with respect to the ecliptic.

The body's observation arc begins with a precovery taken at Mauna Kea on 23 June 2015, or 11 weeks prior to its official first observation. It has a minimum orbital intersection distance with Neptune of 17.5 AU. 2015 RX_{245} has a similar size and orbit as 2013 SY99, as well as close positions to each other at the moment, both about 60 AU from the Sun (see adjunct diagram, in the middle bottom).

== Numbering and naming ==
As of 2025, this minor planet has neither been numbered nor named by the Minor Planet Center. The official discoverers will be defined when the object is numbered.

== Physical characteristics ==
According to American astronomer Michael Brown and to Johnston's Archive, 2015 RX_{245} measures 128 and 130 kilometers in diameter based on an assumed albedo of 0.09 and 0.08, respectively. As of 2018, no rotational lightcurve has been obtained from photometric observations. The body's rotation period, pole and shape remain unknown.

== See also ==
- List of unnumbered trans-Neptunian objects § 2015 RX245
