= 2015 GT50 =

Trans-Neptunian object

2015 GT_{50}
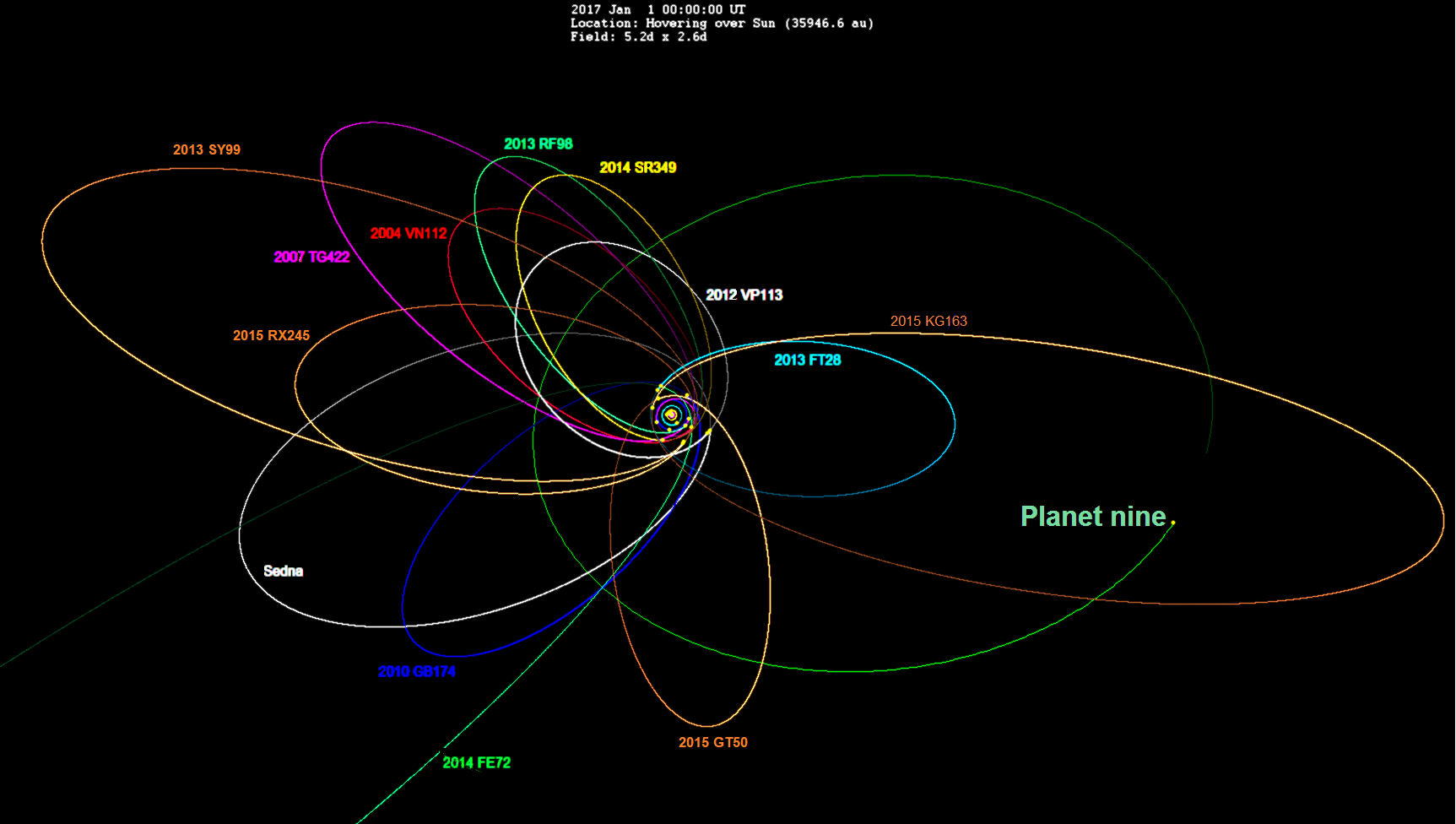
- The orbits of 2015 GT_{50} (bottom; orange) and other detached objects, along with the hypothetical Planet Nine's orbit (right; green)

Discovery
- Discovered by: OSSOS
- Discovery site: Mauna Kea Obs.
- Discovery date: 13 April 2015

Designations
- Alternative designations: o5p060
- Minor planet category: Detached object

Orbital characteristics
- Epoch JDT 2458000.5
- Observation arc: 824 days (2.26 yr)
- Earliest precovery date: 20 February 2015
- Aphelion: 631.89 AU
- Perihelion: 38.45 AU
- Semi-major axis: 335.169 AU
- Eccentricity: 0.885
- Orbital period (sidereal): 6,140 years
- Inclination: 8.779°
- Longitude of ascending node: 46.100°
- Argument of perihelion: 129.236°

Physical characteristics
- Mean diameter: 75 km?
- Geometric albedo: 0.124?
- Absolute magnitude (H): 8.5

2015 GT_{50} is a trans-Neptunian object orbiting in the Kuiper belt of the outermost Solar System. It was first observed by the Outer Solar System Origins Survey using the Canada–France–Hawaii Telescope at Mauna Kea on 13 April 2015.

== Description ==
It is one of a small number of detached objects with perihelion distances of 30 AU or more, and semi-major axes of 250 AU or more. Such objects cannot reach such orbits without some perturbing object, which has led to the Planet Nine hypothesis, that a massive trans-Neptunian planet is the perturber. However 2015 GT_{50} is an interesting outlier of these trans-Neptunian objects that make one of the lines of evidence for Planet Nine. Unlike the others, the shape of whose orbits (longitudes of perihelion) either cluster in anti-alignment with the modeled orbit of Planet Nine or cluster in alignment with it, 2015 GT_{50}'s major axis is almost at a right angle to that of the putative planet. Konstantin Batygin of Caltech suggests that this is only a cosmetic disagreement with his and Mike Brown's predictions for the positions of these bodies. In fact, he notes that without having to change the putative orbit of Planet Nine, 2015 GT_{50} falls into one of the predicted resonant orbits. This, he notes, may be a coincidence. This conclusion, however, is not unanimous, and others have instead suggested that the existence of a population of objects with orbital characteristics similar to those of 2015 GT_{50} may be at odds with the Planet Nine hypothesis.

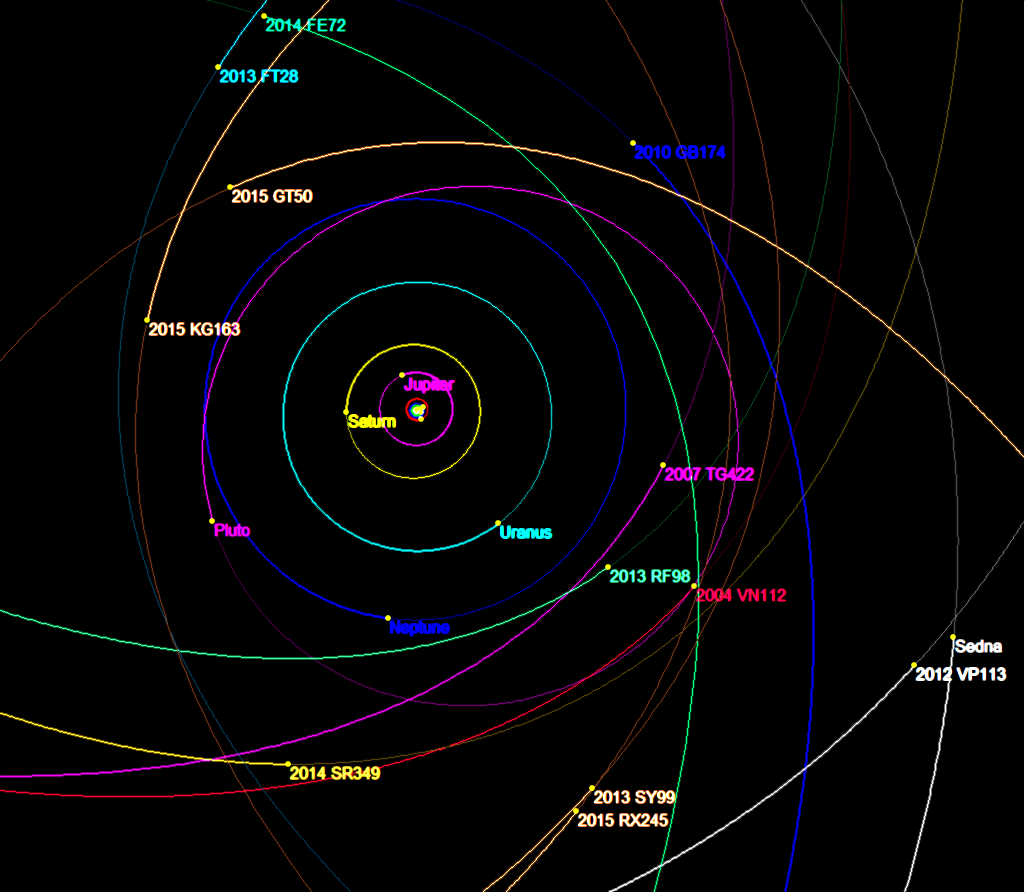
Closeup of current position near perihelion, passing across the top side of this view
