= 2017 OF201 =

Large trans-Neptunian object in the scattered disc

2017 OF_{201}
- 2017 OF_{201} photographed by the Hubble Space Telescope on 17 October 2026

Discovery
- Discovered by: Sihao Cheng, Jiaxuan Li, Eritas Yang
- Discovery site: Cerro Tololo Inter-American Observatory
- Discovery date: 23 July 2017

Designations
- Minor planet category: TNO, SDO and eTNO

Orbital characteristics (barycentric)
- Epoch 5 May 2025 (JD 2460800.5)
- Uncertainty parameter 3
- Observation arc: 14.11 yr (5,153 days) (based on 25 observations)
- Earliest precovery date: 21 Sep 2004
- Aphelion: 1612 AU (barycentric); 1632±14 AU (preliminary); 1693±6 AU (heliocentric) (Note: Given the orbital eccentricity of this object, different epochs can generate quite different heliocentric unperturbed two-body best-fit solutions to the orbital period. For objects at such high eccentricity, using the Solar system's barycenter (Sun+Jupiter) generates solutions that are more stable than heliocentric solutions. For example, at epoch, the "2028-May-01 heliocentric solution". shows aphelion at 1534 AU.)
- Perihelion: 44.91±0.01 AU
- Semi-major axis: 840 AU
- Eccentricity: 0.946
- Orbital period (sidereal): 23800 yr (barycentric); 24300 years (preliminary); 26000±1300 yr (heliocentric)
- Mean anomaly: 1.3°
- Mean motion: 0° 38^{m} 7.8^{s} / day
- Inclination: 16.21°
- Longitude of ascending node: 328.7°
- Time of perihelion: 1930 November 13 ± 3 days
- Argument of perihelion: 338.2°
- Known satellites: 0

Physical characteristics
- Mean diameter: ≈700 km (est. at 0.13 albedo); 560~850 km (for albedo 0.10–0.25); 757 km (estimated)
- Geometric albedo: 0.13 (predicted); 0.124 (estimated)
- Spectral type: B–V = 0.96±0.09 g–r = 0.77±0.08 r–i = 0.56±0.07
- Apparent magnitude: 22.6 (r band)
- Absolute magnitude (H): 3.72±0.09 (V band); 3.49±0.45 (JPL)

2017 OF_{201} is an extreme trans-Neptunian object and dwarf planet candidate, estimated to be around 500 to 900 kilometres (300 to 600 miles) in diameter. It was announced in 2025 by Sihao Cheng, Jiaxuan Li, and Eritas Yang, who discovered the object in archived telescope images from 2011 to 2018. With an absolute magnitude between 3~4, 2017 OF_{201} is one of the brightest known objects in the Solar System that does not have a directly measured size.

The orbit of 2017 OF_{201} is extremely large and elongated, bringing it from 45 to 1,610 astronomical units (0.00071 to 0.02546 ly) away from the Sun. 2017 OF_{201} is not considered a sednoid because its perihelion or closest point to the Sun is below 60 AU, which means that the object comes close enough to Neptune that the planet's gravitational influence affects the orbit of 2017 OF_{201}.

The Hubble Space Telescope photographed 2017 OF_{201} on 17 October 2026, during a search for moons around large trans-Neptunian objects.

== Discovery ==
2017 OF_{201} was discovered by a team at the Institute for Advanced Study led by Sihao Cheng and two Princeton University students, Jiaxuan Li and Eritas Yang, in a search for trans-Neptunian objects (TNOs) in archived Dark Energy Camera Legacy Survey (DECaLS) images in the hope of finding the hypothetical Planet Nine. Cheng stated that he became inspired to survey the deep Solar system after attending a 2005 lecture by Michael E. Brown, the discoverer of Eris and Sedna and co-author of the Planet Nine hypothesis. Cheng's team were able to find ten DECaLS detections of 2017 OF_{201} from 2014–2018, which allowed them to determine that this TNO had an unusually distant and eccentric orbit. Following the advice of Mike Alexandersen of the Minor Planet Center, Cheng's team found nine additional detections of 2017 OF_{201} in archived Canada–France–Hawaii Telescope (CFHT) images from 2011–2012, which further improved calculations of 2017 OF_{201}'s orbit. Cheng's team attempted to search for 2017 OF_{201} in more archived images from the Subaru and Gemini North telescopes, but were unable to find any detections.

Cheng's team reported their DECaLS and CFHT detections to the Minor Planet Center, which gave the TNO its provisional designation 2017 OF_{201} and announced it to the public on 21 May 2025. Following the announcement, the institutions of Cheng's team published a press release and a paper detailing the discovery of 2017 OF_{201}. Additional precovery observations of 2017 OF_{201} were later found in Sloan Digital Sky Survey images from 2004 and 2009.

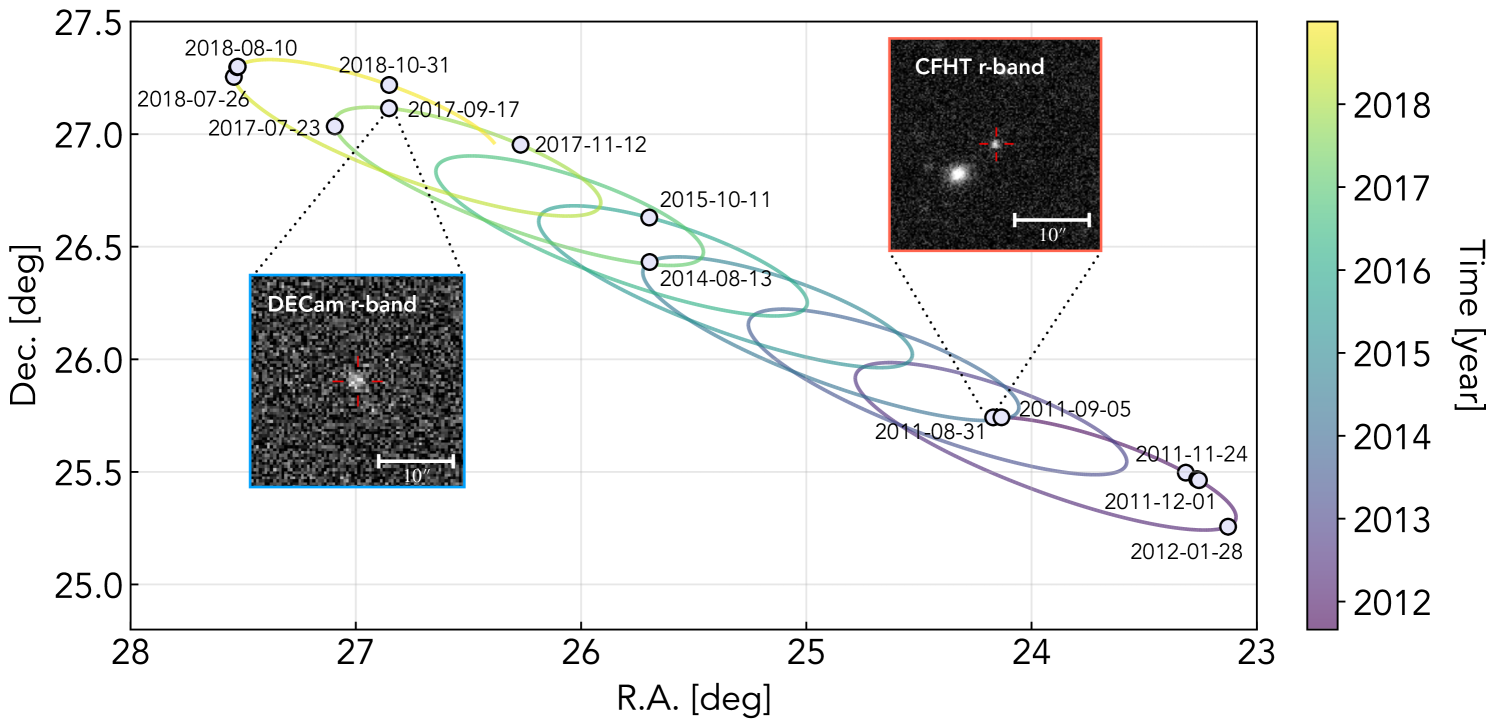
The path of 2017 OF_{201} in the sky from 2012–2018. Black circles mark the time and location of 2017 OF_{201} when it was imaged by DECaLS and CFHT (inset images shown).

== Orbit ==
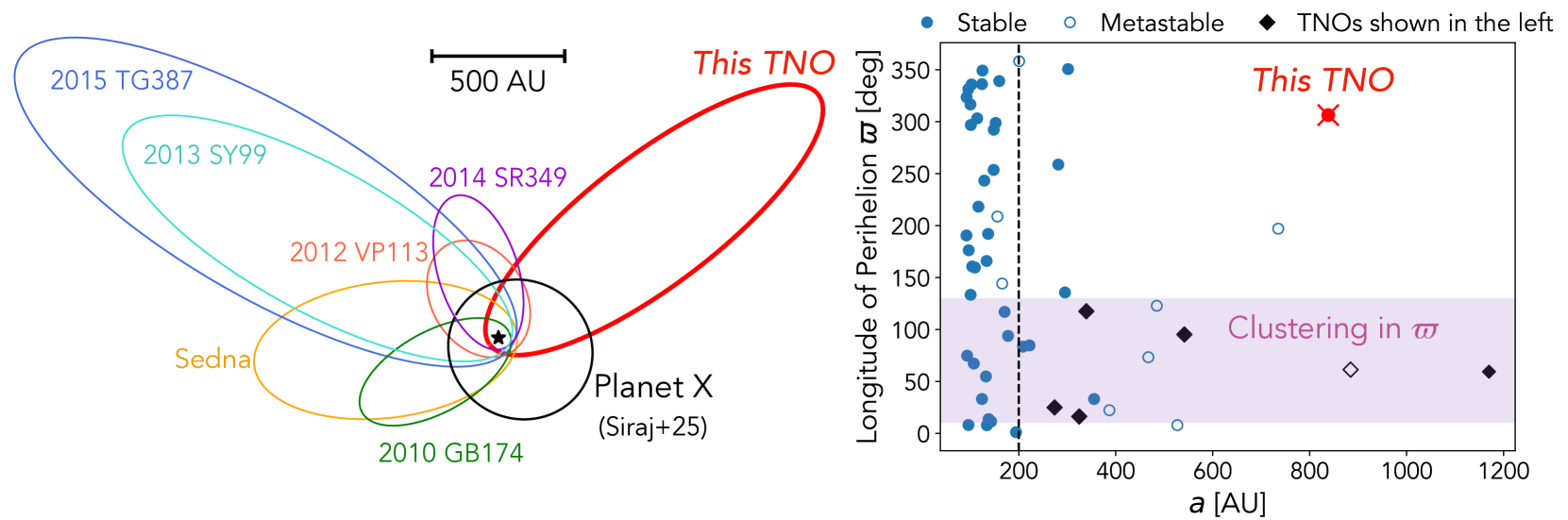
Orbit diagram of 2017 OF_{201} (red) compared to other extreme TNOs. The right plot shows the orientation (longitude of perihelion) and average distance (semi-major axis) of extreme TNO orbits, with 2017 OF_{201} plotted in red.

2017 OF_{201} orbits far beyond Neptune at an average distance (semi-major axis) of 840 astronomical units (AU), taking around 24,000 years to complete an orbit around the Sun. 2017 OF_{201} has an extremely elongated orbit with an eccentricity of 0.95, which together with its large orbital distance makes it an extreme trans-Neptunian object (TNO). 2017 OF_{201} has an orbital inclination of 16.2° with respect to the ecliptic. Fortuitously for its discovery, it recently passed through its closest approach in mid-November 1930. As of 2025, its current distance from the Sun is 90.5 AU, making it one of the most distant observed Solar System objects. Because of 2017 OF_{201}'s extremely distant and eccentric orbit, it is only visible to Earth during perihelion, which spans less than 1% of its orbit. Co-discoverer Eritas Yang stated that the discovery of 2017 OF_{201} means that there are likely thousands of similar objects that are currently too distant and faint from Earth to be observed.

The orbit of 2017 OF_{201} has a perihelion distance of 44.9 AU and aphelion distance of 1,610 AU (0.0255 light-years), which places this object near the estimated boundary of the scattered disc region and the inner Oort cloud. As a result, over billions of years, the orbit of 2017 OF_{201} is shaped by both Neptune and the galactic tide. Specifically, 2017 OF_{201} is thought to have been gravitationally scattered into a high semi-major axis and low perihelion orbit by Neptune first, and then galactic tides and stellar encounters raised its perihelion. Yang has not stated which planetary body the team thinks scattered 2017 OF_{201}, and argued that it might have been scattered multiple times. Specifically, Yang stated the team believes that 2017 OF_{201} had been scattered into the Oort cloud by some "large planet" and something from the Oort cloud ejected it again into its current orbit. In terms of semi-major axis and eccentricity, the orbit of 2017 OF_{201} is similar to that of extreme TNO 2013 SY99.

=== Implications for the Planet Nine hypothesis ===
The orientation or longitude of perihelion of 2017 OF_{201}'s orbit does not align with other extreme TNOs like Sedna, whose orbits have been hypothesized to be clustered because of the gravitational influence of a distant massive planet, dubbed Planet Nine. Simulations run by Cheng's team suggest that Planet Nine would have ejected 2017 OF_{201} from its current orbit within 100 million years, though 2017 OF_{201}'s current orbit could be a temporary state. Cheng stated

"the existence of 2017 OF_{201} as an outlier to [TNOs] clustering could potentially challenge [the Planet Nine] hypothesis."

Konstantin Batygin, the co-author of the Planet Nine hypothesis, argued that the discovery of 2017 OF_{201} means nothing in relation to the hypothesis, because the object's orbit is significantly influenced by Neptune. Cheng, however, notes that 2017 OF_{201} "is right at the boundary between being stable and unstable". Nevertheless, Cheng's team agree that their simulations do not disprove Planet Nine. In an interview with The New York Times, Cheng "still thought Planet Nine was possible" while Yang "was neutral on Planet Nine’s existence". Li initially thought "Okay, this kills Planet Nine" upon seeing 2017 OF_{201}'s orbit, but later conceded that the results were not definitive, jokingly stating that "it's 49 percent killed". Yang also reiterated that the discovery of 2017 OF_{201} means it is likely there are many more similar objects in similar orbits that just have not been detected yet. In response to the discovery, astronomer Samantha Lawler from the University of Regina stated that "the original argument for Planet Nine is getting weaker and weaker".

== Physical characteristics ==
The diameter of 2017 OF_{201} has not been measured with observational techniques, but it can be estimated from its brightness by assuming it has the same geometric albedo as other, similar, large scattered disc objects. Cheng, Li, and Yang estimate that 2017 OF_{201} is most likely 700 km (430 mi) in diameter, with a predicted albedo of 0.13. If 2017 OF_{201} has a density of 1.7 g/cm^{3}, its mass would be roughly 3×10^{20} kg. However, Johnston's archive estimates a diameter of 757 km (470 mi), with an assumed albedo of 0.124. 2017 OF_{201} is likely large enough to achieve hydrostatic equilibrium, which would make it a possible dwarf planet. For reference, Pluto is 2,377 km (1,477 mi) in diameter and Ceres is 939 km (583 mi) in diameter.

Observations of 2017 OF_{201} in different light filters show that it has a red color similar to Sedna. 2017 OF_{201} is slightly redder than the average color of TNOs on scattered disc and detached orbits. The brightness of 2017 OF_{201} does not show variability over 0.1 magnitudes, suggesting that its shape is likely close to spherical.

== See also ==
- 2023 KQ14 – sednoid whose orbit is not aligned with other extreme TNOs
- List of possible dwarf planets
- List of Solar System objects by size
- List of Solar System objects most distant from the Sun
