= (765047) 2013 RA109 =

Extreme trans-Neptunian object

(765047) 2013 RA_{109}
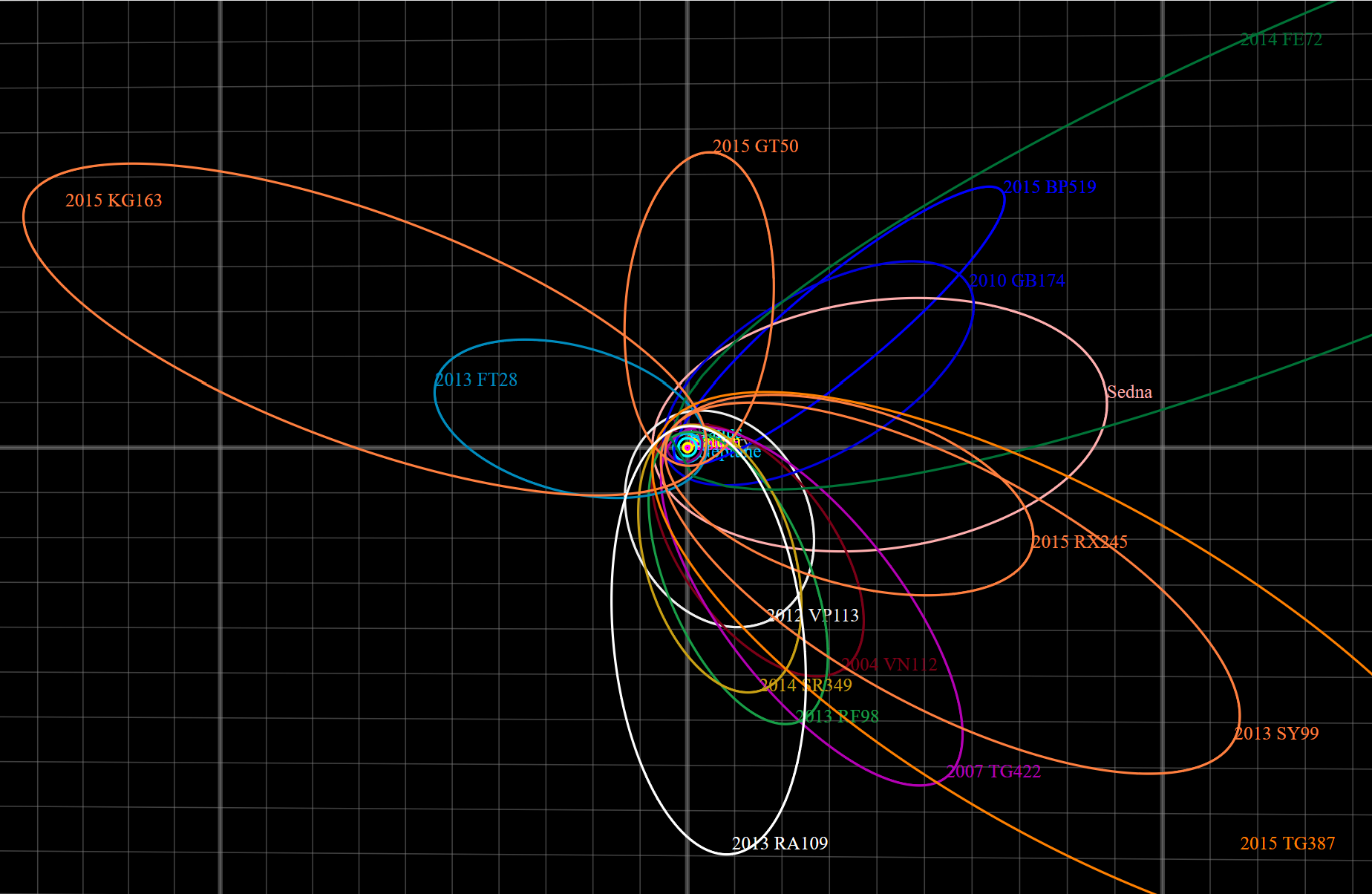
- 2013 RA_{109} (white orbit) with other extreme trans-Neptunian objects

Discovery
- Discovery site: Cerro Tololo Inter-American Observatory, Chile Dark Energy Camera
- Discovery date: 12 September 2013

Designations
- Minor planet category: TNO · detached

Orbital characteristics
- Epoch 27 April 2019 (JD 2458600.5)
- Observation arc: 3.21 yr
- Aphelion: 869.0390 ± 30.9 AU (130.0 ± 4.6 billion km; 80.8 ± 2.9 billion mi)
- Perihelion: 45.9861 ± 0.0461 AU (6.88 ± 0.01 billion km; 4.27 ± 0.00 billion mi)
- Semi-major axis: 457.5125 ± 16.268 AU (68.4 ± 2.4 billion km; 42.5 ± 1.5 billion mi)
- Eccentricity: 0.899487±0.003554
- Orbital period (sidereal): 9786.17±521.9 yr
- Mean anomaly: 359.292°±0.034°
- Mean motion: 0.4410±0.0211 arcsec/day
- Inclination: 12.4048°±0.0004°
- Longitude of ascending node: 104.6820°±0.0206°
- Argument of perihelion: 262.8411°±0.44427°
- Jupiter MOID: 41.1309 AU (6.2 billion km; 3.8 billion mi)

Physical characteristics
- Mean diameter: 216 km (assumed)
- Geometric albedo: 0.124 (assumed)
- Spectral type: bowl/H_{2}O-type
- Absolute magnitude (H): 6.21±0.2211

(765047) 2013 RA_{109} is an extreme trans-Neptunian object discovered on 12 September 2013. This object orbits the Sun between 46.0 and 869 AU (6.9 and 130 billion km), and has an orbital period of 9786 years.

== Physical characteristics ==
=== Diameter and albedo ===
According to Johnston’s archive, 2013 RA_{109} has an assumed diameter of 216 kilometres (134 mi), using an assumed albedo of 0.124.

=== Surface and spectra ===
A paper by Holler and colleagues using NIRSpec IFU on the James Webb Space Telescope reported that 2013 RA_{109} has a "bowl" spectrum, showing that it has signatures of water ice on its surface.
