= (765133) 2013 SL102 =

Trans-Neptunian object

(765133) 2013 SL_{102}
Discovery
- Discovery site: Cerro Tololo-DECam
- Discovery date: 28 September 2013

Designations
- Minor planet category: TNO

Orbital characteristics
- Epoch 27 April 2019 (JD 2458600.5)
- Uncertainty parameter 4
- Observation arc: 3.14 yr (1,147 d)
- Aphelion: 591.98 AU
- Perihelion: 38.102 AU
- Semi-major axis: 315.04 AU
- Eccentricity: 0.8791
- Orbital period (sidereal): 5591.90 yr (2,042,441 d)
- Mean anomaly: 0.5856°
- Mean motion: 0° 0^{m} 0.72^{s} / day
- Inclination: 6.5074°
- Longitude of ascending node: 94.634°
- Argument of perihelion: 265.32°

Physical characteristics
- Mean diameter: 142 km?
- Geometric albedo: 0.124
- Absolute magnitude (H): 6.9663

(765133) 2013 SL_{102} is an extreme trans-Neptunian object from the outermost region of the Solar System. It was discovered on 28 September 2013 by astronomers at Cerro Tololo Observatory, La Serena.

== Orbit and classification ==
It orbits the Sun at a distance of 38.1–592.0 AU once every 5591 years and 11 months (2,042,441 days; semi-major axis of 315.04 AU). Its orbit has an eccentricity of 0.88 and an inclination of 7° with respect to the ecliptic.
