= Extreme trans-Neptunian object =

Solar system objects beyond the other known trans-Neptunian objects

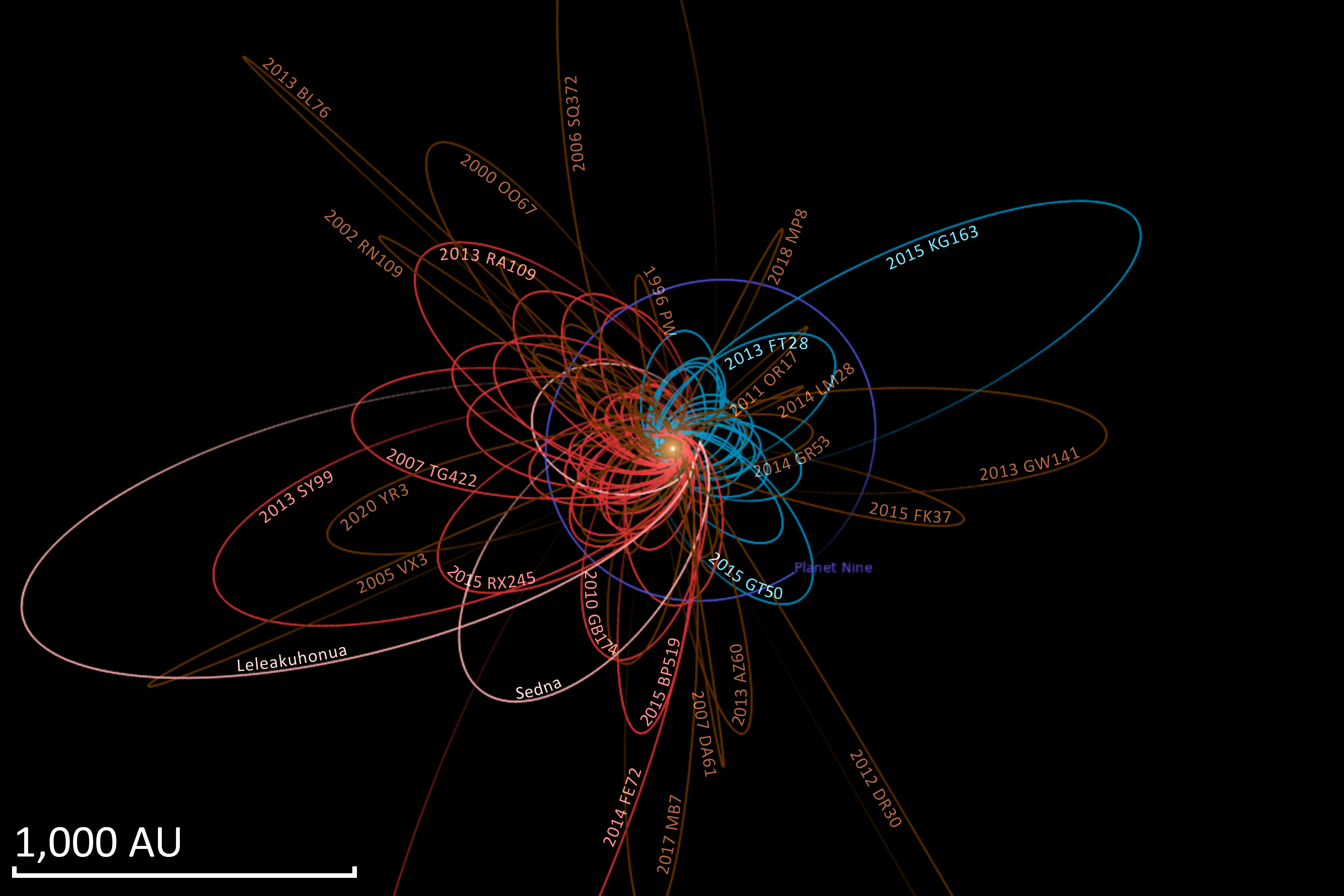
The orbits of Sedna, 2012 VP113, Leleākūhonua, and other very distant objects along with the predicted orbit of Planet Nine (Note: The three sednoids (pink) along with the red-colored extreme trans-Neptunian object (ETNO) orbits are suspected to be aligned with the hypothetical Planet Nine while the blue-colored ETNO orbits are anti-aligned. The highly elongated orbits colored brown include centaurs and damocloids with large aphelion distances over 200 AU.)

An extreme trans-Neptunian object (ETNO) is a trans-Neptunian object orbiting the Sun well beyond Neptune (30 AU) in the outermost region of the Solar System. An ETNO has a large semi-major axis of at least 150–250 AU. The orbits of ETNOs are much less affected by the known giant planets than all other known trans-Neptunian objects. They may, however, be influenced by gravitational interactions with a hypothetical Planet Nine, shepherding these objects into similar types of orbits. The known ETNOs exhibit a highly statistically significant asymmetry between the distributions of object pairs with small ascending and descending nodal distances that might be indicative of a response to external perturbations.

ETNOs can be divided into three different subgroups. The scattered ETNOs (or extreme scattered disc objects, ESDOs) have perihelia around 38–45 AU and an exceptionally high eccentricity of more than 0.85. As with the regular scattered disc objects, they were likely formed as result of gravitational scattering by Neptune and still interact with the giant planets. The detached ETNOs (or extreme detached disc objects, EDDOs), with perihelia approximately between 40–45 and 50–60 AU, are less affected by Neptune than the scattered ETNOs, but are still relatively close to Neptune. The sednoid or inner Oort cloud objects, with perihelia beyond 50–60 AU, are too far from Neptune to be strongly influenced by it.

== Sednoids ==
Among the extreme trans-Neptunian objects are the sednoids, four objects with an outstandingly high perihelion: Sedna, 2012 VP113, Leleākūhonua, and 2023 KQ14. Sedna and 2012 VP_{113} are distant detached objects with perihelia greater than 70 AU. Their high perihelia keep them at a sufficient distance to avoid significant gravitational perturbations from Neptune. Previous explanations for the high perihelion of Sedna include a close encounter with an unknown planet on a distant orbit and a distant encounter with a random star or a member of the Sun's birth cluster that passed near the Solar System.

== Most distant objects from the Sun ==
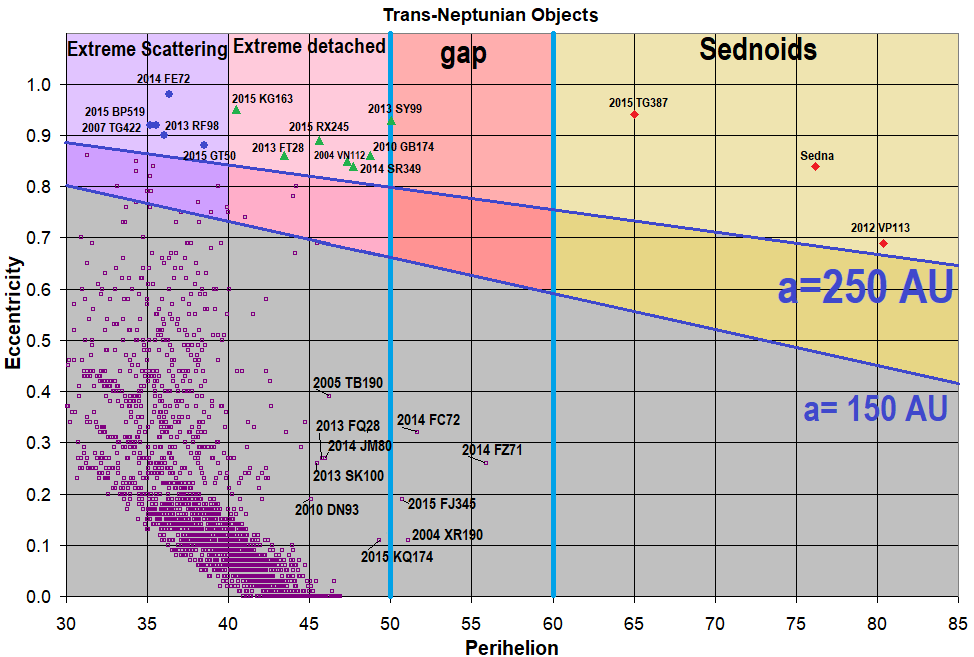
The chart above plots trans-Neptunian objects with a perihelion beyond Neptune (30 AU). While regular TNOs are located in the bottom left of the plot, an ETNO has a semi-major axis greater than 150–250 AU. They can be grouped by their perihelia into three distinct populations: scattered ETNOs or ESDOs (38–45 AU) detached ETNOs or EDDOs (40–45 to 50–60 AU) sednoids or inner Oort cloud objects (beyond 50–60 AU)

== Notable discoveries ==
=== Trujillo and Sheppard discoveries ===
Extreme trans-Neptunian objects discovered by astronomers Chad Trujillo and Scott S. Sheppard include:

- 2013 FT28, which has a longitude of perihelion aligned with Planet Nine, but well within the proposed orbit of Planet Nine, where computer modeling suggests it would be safe from gravitational kicks.
- 2014 SR349, which appears to be anti-aligned with Planet Nine.
- 2014 FE72, an object with an orbit so extreme that it reaches about 4000 AU from the Sun in a massively-elongated ellipse – at this distance its orbit is influenced by the galactic tide and other stars.

=== Outer Solar System Origins Survey ===
The Outer Solar System Origins Survey has discovered more extreme trans-Neptunian objects, including:

- 2013 SY99, which has a lower inclination than many of the objects, and which was discussed by Michele Bannister at a March 2016 lecture hosted by the SETI Institute and later at an October 2016 AAS conference.
- 2015 KG163, which has an orientation similar to 2013 FT_{28} but has a larger semi-major axis that may result in its orbit crossing Planet Nine's.
- 2015 RX245, which fits with the other anti-aligned objects.
- 2015 GT50, which is in neither the anti-aligned nor the aligned groups; instead, its orbit's orientation is at a right angle to that of the proposed Planet Nine. Its argument of perihelion is also outside the cluster of arguments of perihelion.

Since early 2016, ten more extreme trans-Neptunian objects have been discovered with orbits that have a perihelion greater than 30 AU and a semi-major axis greater than 250 AU bringing the total to sixteen (see table below for a complete list). Most TNOs have perihelia significantly beyond Neptune, which orbits 30 AU from the Sun. Generally, TNOs with perihelia smaller than 36 AU experience strong encounters with Neptune. Most of the ETNOs are relatively small, but currently relatively bright because they are near their closest distance to the Sun in their elliptical orbits. These are also included in the orbital diagrams and tables below.

== List ==
The extreme trans-Neptunian object orbits

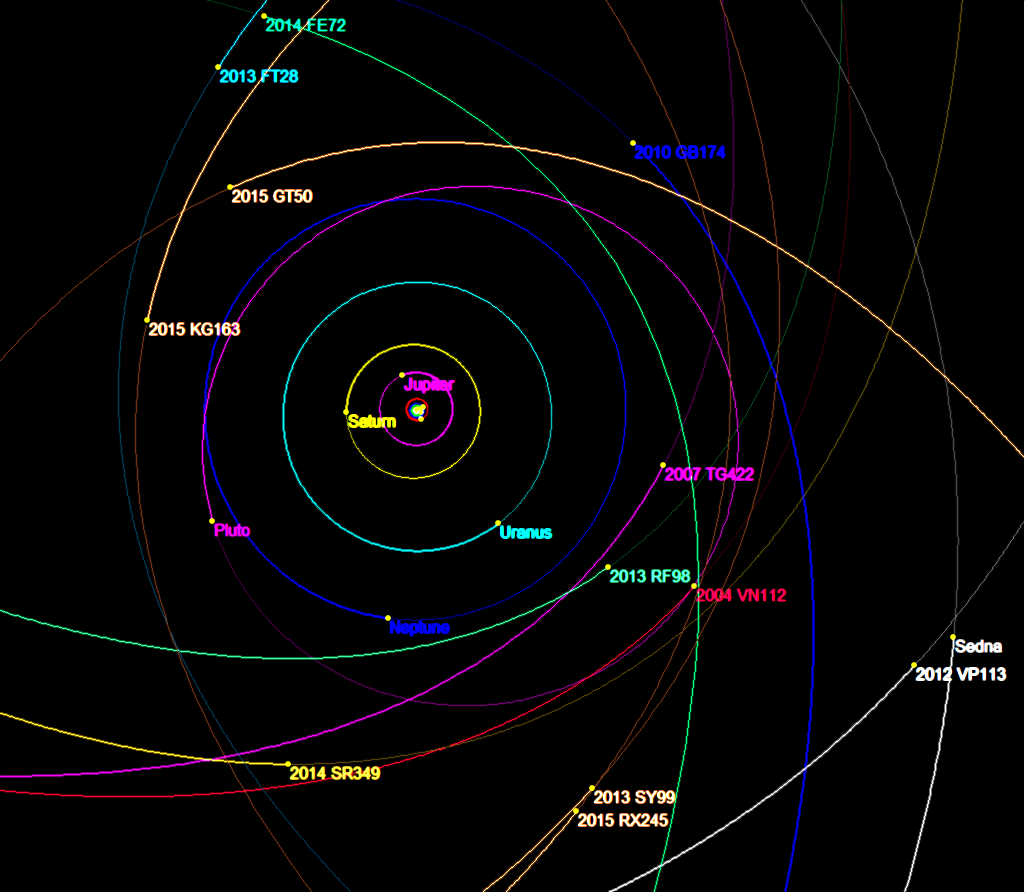
Close up view of 13 TNO current positions

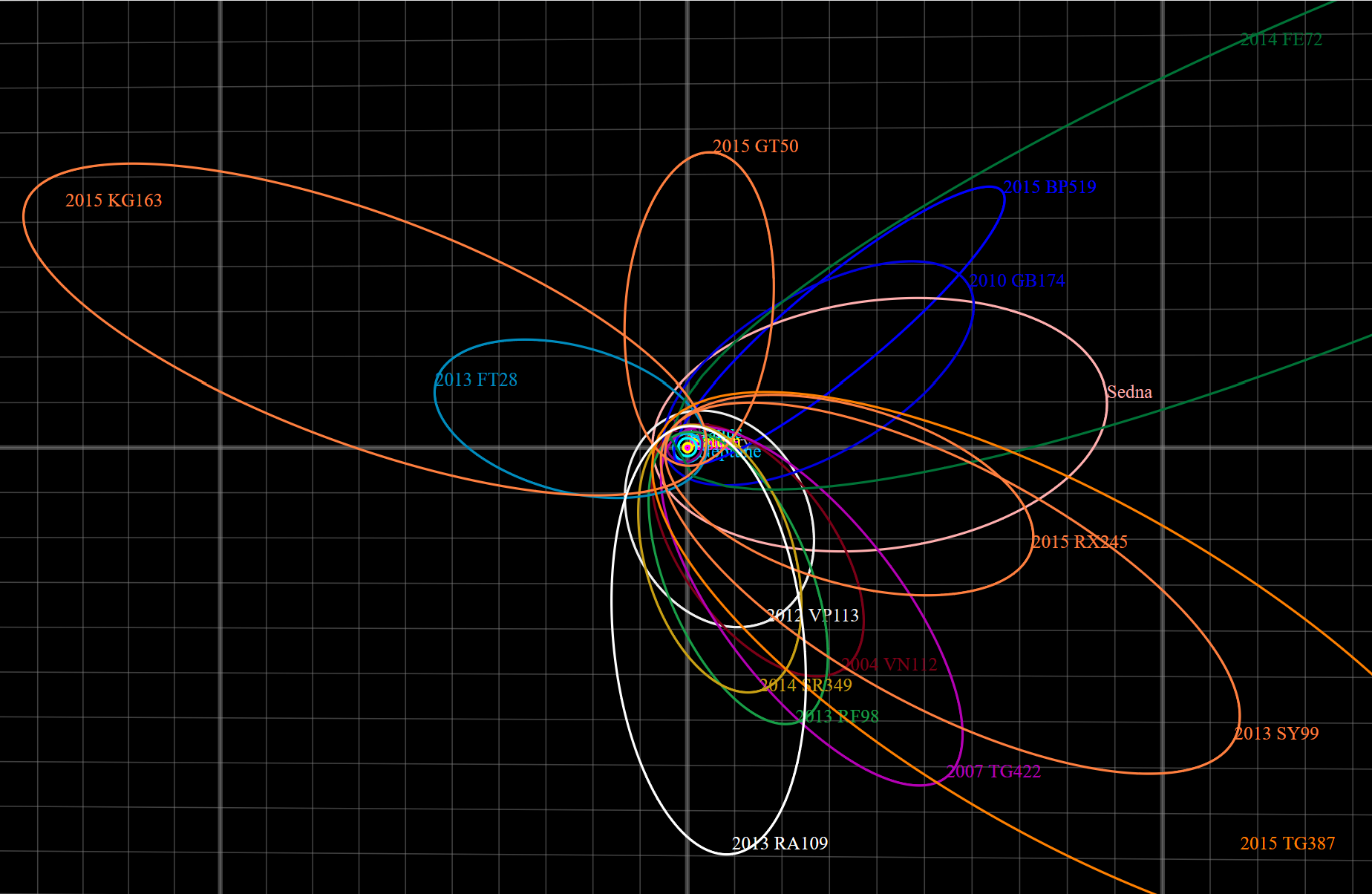
6 original and 10 additional TNO object orbits with current positions near their perihelion in purple

Extreme trans-Neptunian objects with perihelia greater than 30 AU and semi-major axes greater than 250 AU
Object	Barycentric Orbit (JD 2459600.5) (Note: Given the orbital eccentricity of these objects, different epochs can generate quite different heliocentric unperturbed two-body best-fit solutions to the semi-major axis and orbital period. For objects at such high eccentricity, the Sun's barycenter is more stable than heliocentric values. Barycentric values better account for the changing position of Jupiter over Jupiter's 12 year orbit. As an example, 2007 TG422 has an epoch 2012 heliocentric period of ~13,500 years, yet an epoch 2020 heliocentric period of ~10,800 years. The barycentric solution is a much more stable ~11,300 years.)								Orbital plane			Body		
Object	Stability	Orbital period (years)	Semimajor axis (AU)	Perihelion (AU)	Aphelion (AU)	Current distance from Sun (AU)	Eccent.	Argum. peri ω (°)	inclin. i (°)	Longitude of		Hv	Current mag.	Diameter (km)
Object	Stability	Orbital period (years)	Semimajor axis (AU)	Perihelion (AU)	Aphelion (AU)	Current distance from Sun (AU)	Eccent.	Argum. peri ω (°)	inclin. i (°)	Ascending node ☊ or Ω (°)	Perihelion ϖ=ω+Ω (°)	Hv	Current mag.	Diameter (km)
Sedna	Stable	11,400	485	76.3	893	84.5	0.84	311.3	11.9	144.2	95.6	1.3	20.7	995
Alicanto	Stable	5,900	327	47.3	608	48.1	0.86	326.7	25.6	66.0	32.7	6.5	23.5	193
(523622) 2007 TG422	Unstable	11,260	502	35.6	969	38.5	0.93	285.6	18.6	112.9	38.4	6.5	22.5	192
Leleākūhonua	Stable	41,196	1,193	64.8	2,322	78.0	0.94	117.8	11.7	300.8	58.5	5.5	24.6	220
2010 GB174	Stable	6,600	342	48.6	636	73.1	0.86	347.1	21.6	130.9	118.0	6.5	25.2	169
2012 VP113	Stable	4,300	261	80.4	443	84.0	0.69	293.6	24.1	90.7	24.3	4.0	23.3	585
(689335) 2013 FL_{28}	?	6,780	358	32.2	684	33.4	0.91	225.1	15.8	294.4	159.5 (*)	8.0	23.4	91
2013 FT28	Metastable	5,050	305	43.4	566	55.2	0.86	40.8	17.4	217.7	258.5 (*)	6.7	24.2	137
2013 RF98	Unstable	6,900	370	36.1	705	37.6	0.90	311.6	29.6	67.6	19.2	8.7	24.6	67
(765047) 2013 RA109	?	9,950	463	46.0	880	47.4	0.90	262.9	12.4	104.8	7.6	6.1	23.1	216
2013 SY99	Metastable	19,800	733	50.0	1,420	57.9	0.93	32.2	4.2	29.5	61.7	6.7	24.5	162
(765133) 2013 SL102	Unstable	5,590	326	38.1	614	39.3	0.88	265.4	6.5	94.6	0.0 (*)	7.0	23.2	142
2014 FE72	Unstable	92,400	2,040	36.1	4,050	64.0	0.98	133.9	20.6	336.8	110.7	6.2	24.3	218
2014 SX_{403}	?	7,180	370	35.5	710	45.1	0.90	174.7	42.9	149.2	323.9 (*)	7.1	23.8	146
2014 SR349	Stable	5,160	312	47.7	576	54.8	0.85	340.8	18.0	34.9	15.6	6.7	24.2	193
2014 TU_{115}	?	6,140	335	35.0	636	35.3	0.90	225.3	23.5	192.3	57.7	7.9	23.5	101
2014 WB_{556}	Metastable?	4,900	288	42.7	534	46.6	0.85	235.3	24.2	114.7	350.0 (*)	7.3	24.2	133
Geyagugv	?	9,500	433	35.2	831	51.4	0.92	348.2	54.1	135.0	123.3 (*)	4.5	21.7	511
2015 DY_{248}	?	5,400	309	34.0	585	34.4	0.89	244.6	12.9	273.1	157.7 (*)	8.3	23.9	82
2015 DM_{319} (uo5m93)	Unstable?	4,620	278	39.5	516	41.7	0.86	43.4	6.8	166.0	209.4 (*)	8.7	25.0	66
2015 GT50	Unstable	5,510	314	38.5	589	42.9	0.88	129.3	8.8	46.1	175.4 (*)	8.5	24.9	75
2015 KG163	Unstable	22,840	805	40.5	1,570	40.5	0.95	32.3	14.0	219.1	251.4 (*)	8.2	24.4	86
2015 RX245	Metastable	8,920	421	45.7	796	59.9	0.89	64.8	12.1	8.6	73.4	6.2	24.1	217
2016 SA_{59}	?	3,830	250	39.1	451	42.3	0.84	200.3	21.5	174.7	15.0	7.8	24.2	103
2016 SD_{106}	?	6,550	350	42.7	658	44.5	0.88	162.9	4.8	219.4	22.3	6.7	23.4	163
2017 OF201	?	24,200	837	44.9	1,629	88.5	0.95	337.7	16.2	328.6	306.3 (*)	3.5	23.0	736
2018 VM_{35}	Stable	4,500	252	45.0	459	54.8	0.82	302.9	8.5	192.4	135.3 (*)	7.7	25.2	106
2019 EU_{5}	?	42,600	1,220	46.8	2,400	81.1	0.96	109.2	18.2	109.2	218.4 (*)	6.4	25.6	203
2020 MQ_{53}	?	21,395	770	55.6	1,486	—	0.93	18.6	73.4	287.1	305.7 (*)	8.6		70
2021 DK_{18}	?	21,400	770	44.4	1,500	66.3	0.94	234.8	15.4	322.3	197.0 (*)	6.8	25.1	169
2021 RR205	?	31,200	992	55.5	1,930	60.0	0.94	208.6	7.6	108.3	316.9 (*)	6.8	24.6	169
2023 KQ14	?	3,998	251.9	65.9	438.1	70.1	0.74	198.7	11.0	72.1	270.8 (*)	6.8	25.4	300
Ideal elements under hypothesis		—	>250	>30	—	—	>0.5	—	10~30	—	2~120	—	—	—
Hypothesized Planet Nine		8,000–22,000	400–800	~200	~1,000	~1,000?	0.2–0.5	~150	15–25	91±15	241±15		>22.5	~40,000

- (*) longitude of perihelion, ϖ, outside expected range;
- are the objects included in the original study by Trujillo and Sheppard (2014).
- has been added in the 2016 study by Brown and Batygin.
- All other objects have been announced later.

The most extreme case is that of 768325 Geyagugv (2015 BP_{519}) which has both the highest inclination and the farthest nodal distance; these properties make it a probable outlier within this population.
