= Shannon Stirone =

American science journalist and editor

- Education: B.A. in Art History
- Alma mater: Sonoma State University
- Occupation: Author, Journalist
- Writing career
- Genre: Popular science
- Website: www.shannonstirone.com

Shannon Stirone is an American science journalist and writer, who writes about space travel and the human connection to space exploration. A native of California, she now lives in New York City. She is currently the Managing Editor at Energy Innovation Policy & Technology LLC.

== Education ==
Stirone has a B.A. in art history from Sonoma State University.

== Writing ==
Stirone has written for numerous publications, including The Atlantic, Longreads, National Geographic, The New York Times, Popular Science, Rolling Stone, Scientific American, Slate, Wired, and the Washington Post.

== Recognition ==
Her work has also been featured in The Best American Science and Nature Writing book series, published by Houghton Mifflin Harcourt, in 2019, 2020, and 2021.

== Views ==
Stirone often writes about advances in space technology such as the Dark Energy Spectroscopic Instrument and profiles the work of scientists in astronomy and related fields like Mike Brown and Konstantin Batygin. Notably, Stirone has been a vocal critic of Elon Musk, his plans to colonize Mars, and the impacts on the night sky due to his Starlink satellites. Stirone has also criticized the billionaire space race.
