= 2010 GB174 =

Detached object

2010 GB_{174}
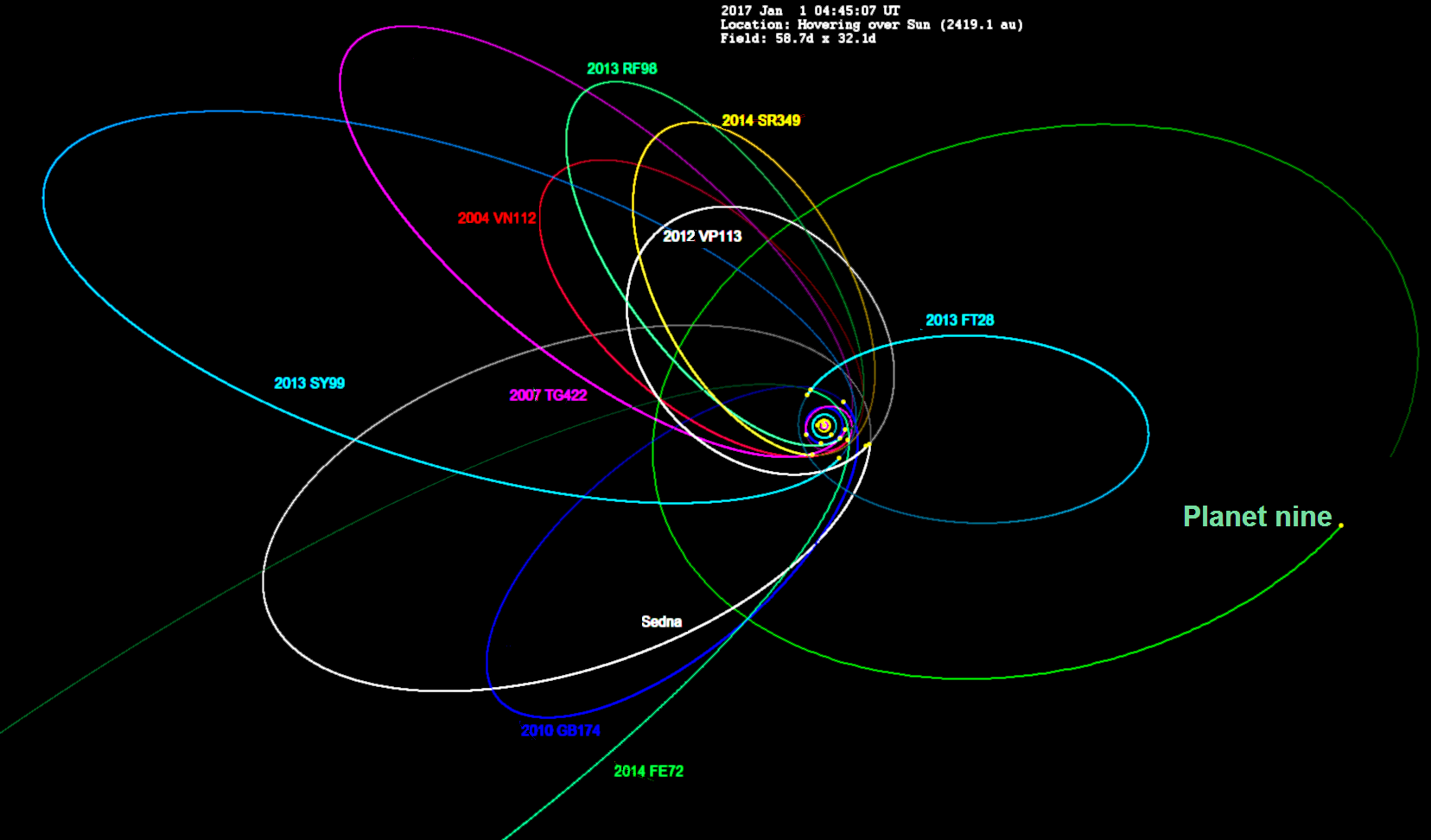
- Orbits of 2010 GB_{174} (dark blue) and other scattered/detached objects, along with hypothetical Planet Nine on the right

Discovery
- Discovery date: 12 April 2010

Designations
- Designation: 2010 GB_{174}
- Minor planet category: detached object

Orbital characteristics
- Epoch 21 November 2025 (JD 2461000.5)
- Observation arc: 5.83 years
- Earliest precovery date: 26 June 2009
- Aphelion: 649 AU (barycentric); 665±15 AU (Q)
- Perihelion: 48.4±0.07 AU
- Semi-major axis: 349 AU (barycentric); 357±8 AU (a)
- Eccentricity: 0.864±0.003
- Orbital period (sidereal): 6500 yr (barycentric); 6738±235 yr
- Mean anomaly: 3.96°±0.1°
- Mean motion: 0° 0^{m} 0.527^{s} / day
- Inclination: 21.54°
- Longitude of ascending node: 130.6° (Ω)
- Time of perihelion: ≈ 1951-Aug-20
- Argument of perihelion: 347.3°±0.08° (ω)

Physical characteristics
- Dimensions: 223 km (based on assumed albedo); 130–300 km
- Albedo: 0.08 (assumed)
- Apparent magnitude: 25.2
- Absolute magnitude (H): 6.74

2010 GB_{174} is a detached object, discovered on 12 April 2010 on data taken at the Canada–France–Hawaii Telescope as part of the Next Generation Virgo Cluster Survey. It never gets closer than 48.5 AU from the Sun (about the outer edge of the Kuiper belt). Its large eccentricity strongly suggests that it was gravitationally scattered onto its current orbit. It is, like all detached objects, outside the current influence of Neptune, so how it got its current orbit is unknown. 2010 GB_{174} has the third highest Tisserand parameter relative to Jupiter of any trans-Neptunian object, after Sedna and 2012 VP113. It has not been observed since 2015. It comes to opposition in late March each year in the constellation of Virgo.

Precovery images have been found back to 26 June 2009.

It reached perihelion (closest approach to the Sun) in mid-1951 and had moved beyond 70 AU in September 2014.

Numerical simulations based on models of Solar System formation suggest this object, along with Sedna, may be part of the inner edge of the Oort cloud.

== Comparison ==
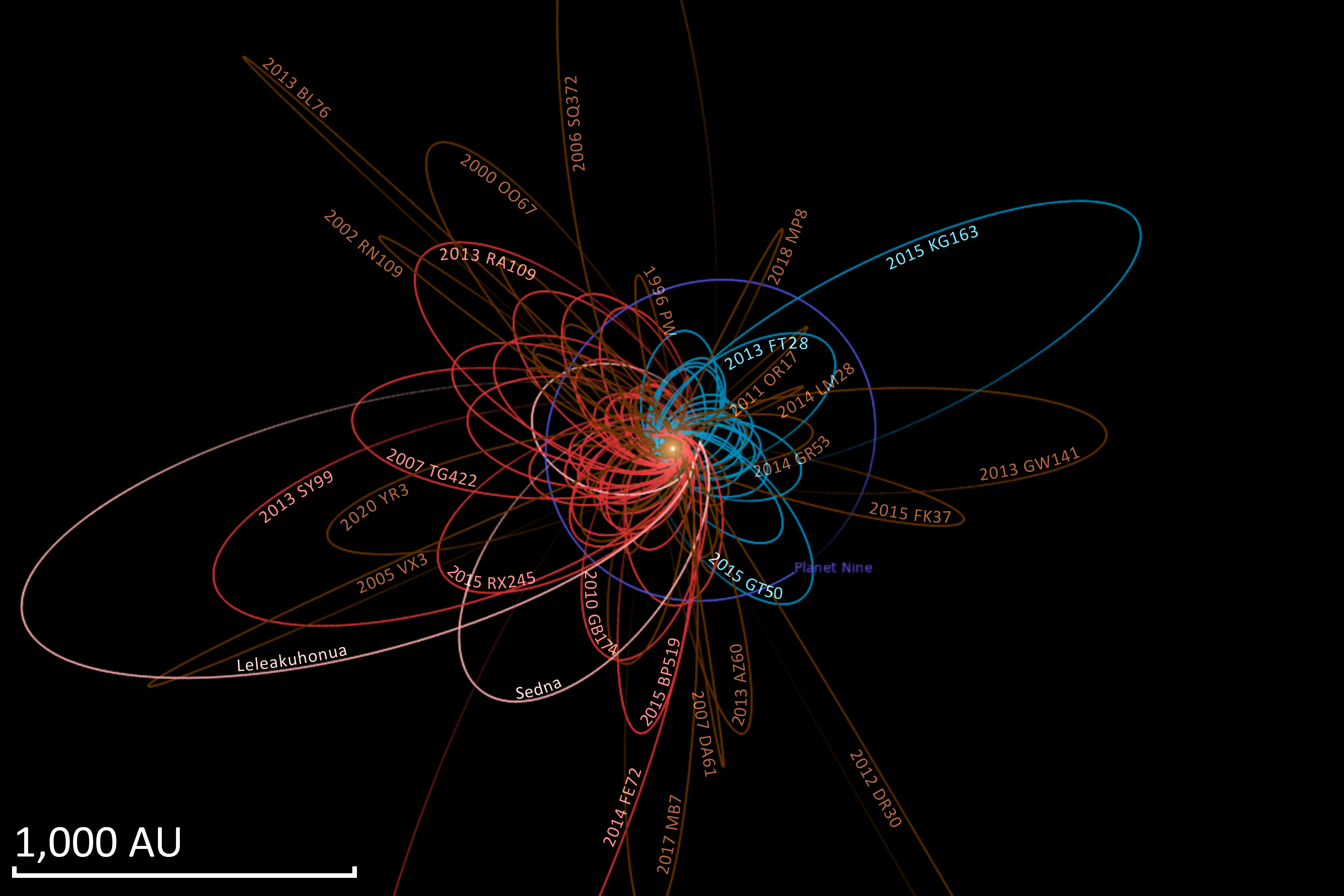
The orbits of Sedna, 2012 VP113, Leleākūhonua, and other very distant objects along with the predicted orbit of Planet Nine. The three sednoids (pink) along with the red-colored extreme trans-Neptunian object (eTNO) orbits are suspected to be aligned with the hypothetical Planet Nine while the blue-colored eTNO orbits are anti-aligned. The highly elongated orbits colored brown include centaurs and damocloids with large aphelion distances over 200 AU.

== See also ==
- List of Solar System objects most distant from the Sun
