= 2013 SY99 =

Trans-Neptunian object

2013 SY_{99}
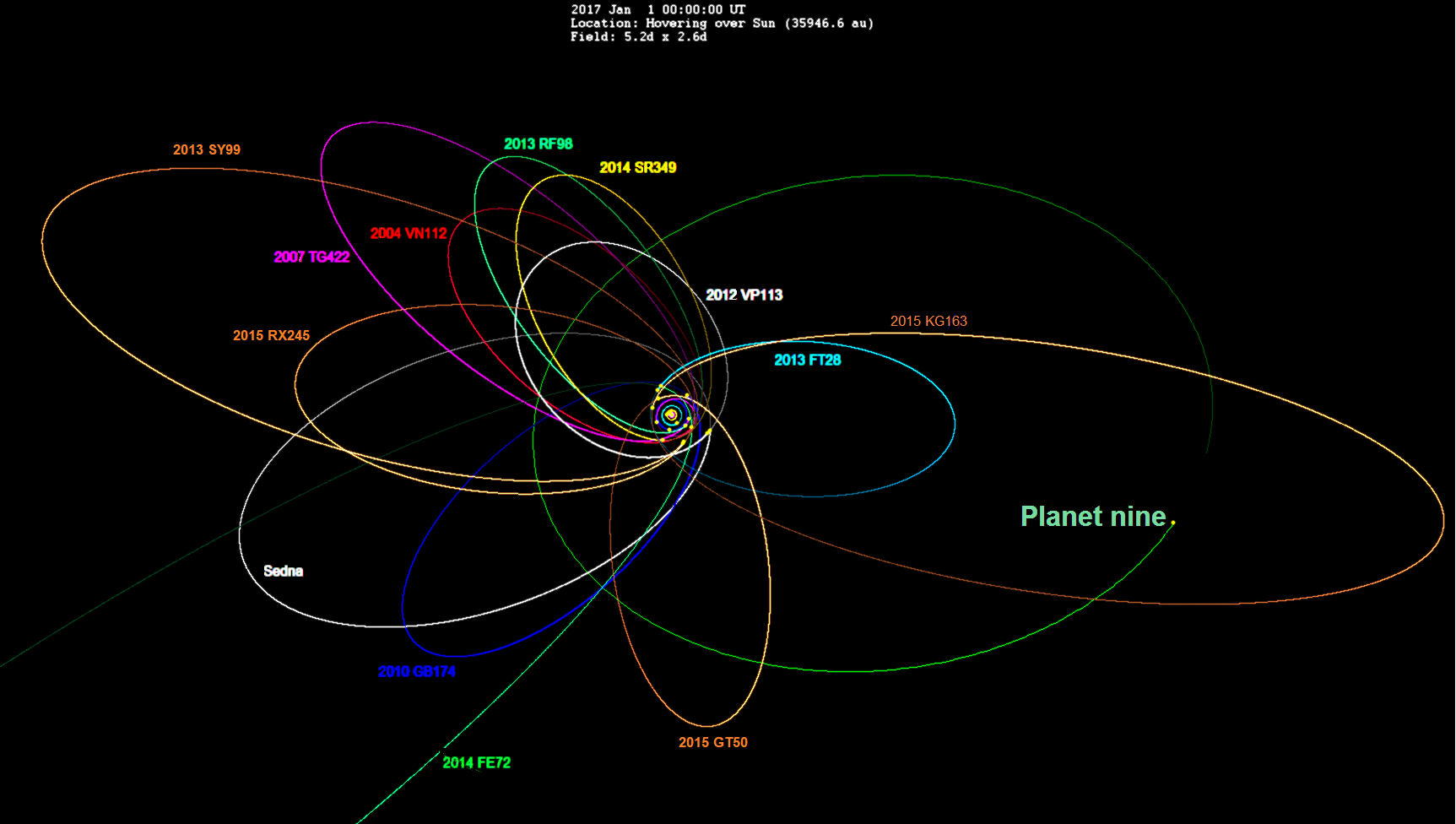
- The orbits of 2013 SY_{99} (left; light blue) and other detached objects, along with the hypothetical Planet Nine's orbit (right; green)

Discovery
- Discovered by: OSSOS
- Discovery site: CFHT
- Discovery date: 29 September 2013

Designations
- Alternative designations: uo3L91 (OSSOS survey designation)
- Minor planet category: TNO · detached

Orbital characteristics
- Epoch 27 April 2019 (JD 2458600.5)
- Uncertainty parameter 4
- Observation arc: 4.30 yr
- Earliest precovery date: 5 September 2013
- Aphelion: Barycentric: 1,410 AU (Note: Heliocentric solutions are unstable due to the changing position of Jupiter over Jupiter's 12 year orbit which perturbs the eccentricity of the two-body solution of the Sun+asteroid. Barycentric solutions are more stable for objects that take thousands of years to orbit the Sun. Between epoch 2017 and epoch 2029, the heliocentric orbital period varies from a low of 17400 years "PR= 6.364×10^{6} d (epoch 2017-Nov-16)" to a high of 26100 years "PR= 9.538×10^{6} d (epoch 2023-Nov-16)".) (211 billion km; 131 billion mi); Heliocentric: 1,330.8 ± 43.4 AU (199.1 ± 6.5 billion km; 123.7 ± 4.0 billion mi)
- Perihelion: 50.029 ± 0.056 AU (7.48 ± 0.01 billion km; 4.65 ± 0.01 billion mi)
- Semi-major axis: Barycentric: 730 AU (109 billion km; 68 billion mi); Heliocentric: 690.4 ± 22.5 AU (103.3 ± 3.4 billion km; 64.2 ± 2.1 billion mi)
- Eccentricity: 0.9274±0.0024
- Orbital period (sidereal): Barycentric: 19700 yr; Heliocentric: 18142.4±886.5 yr
- Mean anomaly: 359.292°±0.034°
- Mean motion: 0.203±0.010 arcsec/day
- Inclination: 4.228°±0.001°
- Longitude of ascending node: 29.493°±0.005°
- Time of perihelion: ≈ 4 December 2054 ±1 month
- Argument of perihelion: 32.037°±0.114°
- Jupiter MOID: 45.00 AU (6.7 billion km; 4.2 billion mi)

Physical characteristics
- Mean diameter: ≈250 km (160 mi)
- Geometric albedo: 0.05±0.03
- Spectral type: moderately red
- Apparent magnitude: 24.5 (V); 23.67 (peak 2055)
- Absolute magnitude (H): 6.7

2013 SY_{99} is a trans-Neptunian object discovered on 29 September 2013 by the Outer Solar System Origins Survey using the Canada–France–Hawaii Telescope at Mauna Kea Observatory. This object orbits the Sun between 50 and 1,300 AU (7.5 and 190 billion km), and has a barycentric orbital period of nearly 20,000 years. It has the fourth largest semi-major axis for an orbit with perihelion beyond 38 AU. 2013 SY_{99} has one of highest perihelia of any known extreme trans-Neptunian object, behind sednoids including Sedna (76 AU), 2012 VP113 (80 AU), and Leleākūhonua (65 AU).

== Discovery ==
According to astronomers Mike Brown and Konstantin Batygin, the discovery of 2013 SY_{99} provides additional evidence for the existence of Planet Nine, but Michele Bannister, one of the astronomers who reported the discovery of this object, disputes this due to the orientation of the orbit.

Its existence was announced in 2016, but the observations were kept private until 2017. It was listed at the Minor Planet Center and the JPL Small-Body Database on 6 April 2017 with a three-year observation arc and an epoch 2017 heliocentric orbital period of 17,500 years. Barycentric orbital solutions, however, are more stable for objects on multi-thousand year orbits, and the barycentric period for 2013 SY_{99} is 19,700 years.

As of April 2019, its perihelion distance of q=50.029±0.056 AU and semi-major axis a=690±22 AU make 2013 SY_{99} a possible sednoid, according to the most common definition of the term (q>50 AU, a>150 AU). It is listed as a sednoid by some. However, 2013 SY_{99} is usually considered to be an extreme trans-Neptunian object and not a sednoid, due to its high eccentricity which makes the heliocentric orbit unstable. In the heliocentric reference frame, the perihelion is currently rising, and the nominal orbit has a perihelion distance above 50 AU only since October 2018.

2013 SY_{99} is estimated to be about 250 km (160 mi) in diameter and moderately red in color. In 2052 it will be roughly 20.3 AU (3.04 billion km) from Neptune. It will come to perihelion (closest approach to the Sun) around 2055 when it will be 50 AU (7.5 billion km) from the Sun.

== Physical characteristics ==
=== Diameter and albedo ===
According to the discovery paper, it has a mean diameter of ∼250 km (160 mi) using 0.05 ± 0.03 albedo. Johnston's archive estimates a diameter of 162 km (101 mi) using an assumed albedo of 0.124.

=== Surface and spectra ===
2013 SY_{99} has color indices of: g-r 0.64 ± 0.06, and r-i 0.46 ± 0.10. This color implies that it has a low albedo of 0.05±0.03. Johnston's archive assumes a albedo of 0.124.

== See also ==
- List of Solar System objects most distant from the Sun
