= Konstantin Batygin =

American astronomer and planetary scientist (born 1986)

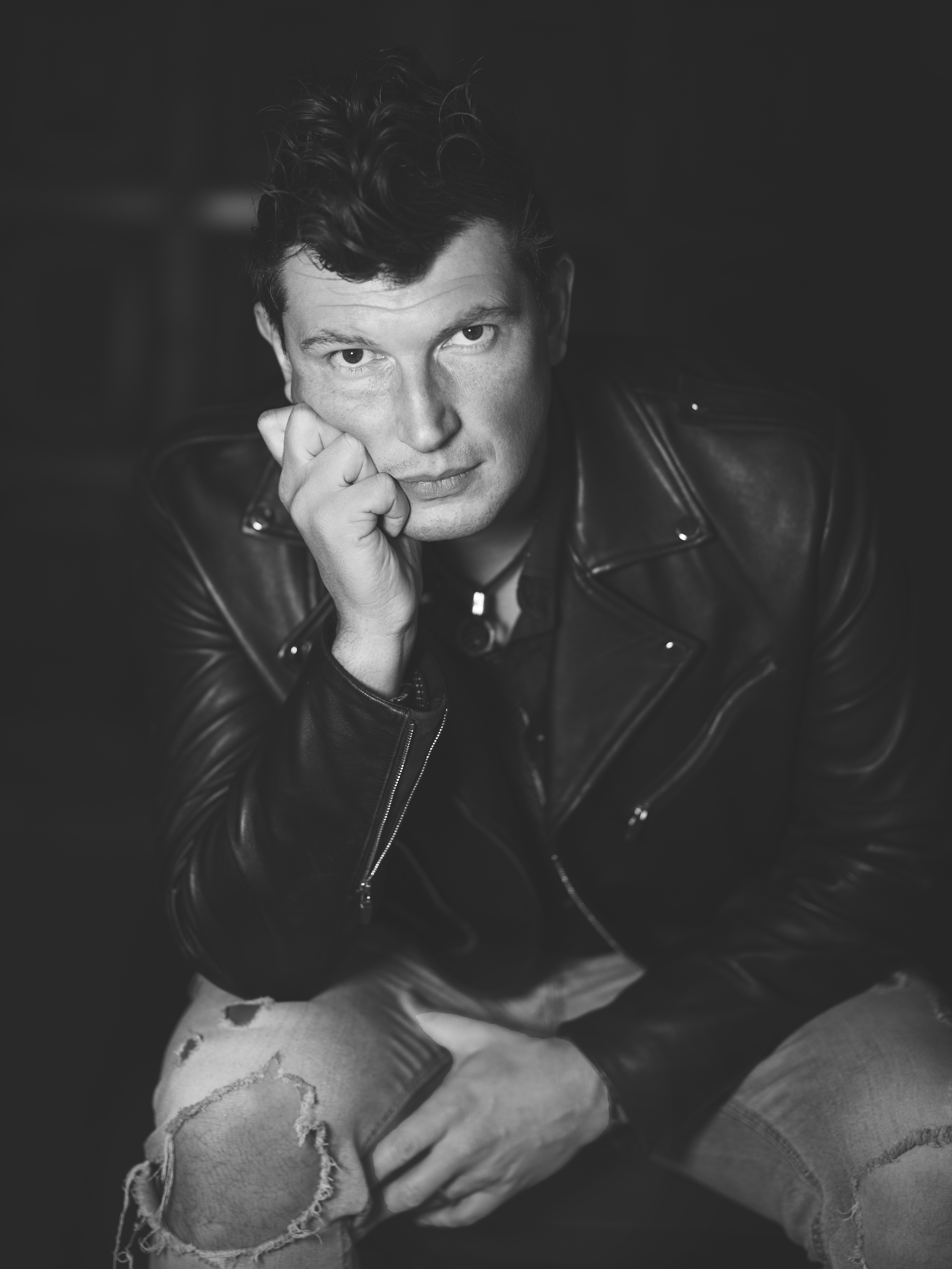
- Konstantin Batygin in 2022
- Born: Konstantin Yuryevich Batygin; 23 March 1986 (age 40); Moscow, RSFSR, Soviet Union
- Education: University of California, Santa Cruz, California Institute of Technology
- Known for: Planet Nine
- Scientific career
- Fields: Planetary astronomy
- Website: www.konstantinbatygin.com

Konstantin Batygin (Russian: Константи́н Юрьевич Батыгин) is an American astronomer and Professor of Planetary Sciences at Caltech.

== Early life ==
Konstantin Batygin was born in Moscow, Soviet Union. His father, Yuri Konstantinovich Batygin, worked as an accelerator physicist in the Moscow Engineering Physics Institute until 1994, when he moved along with his wife Galina and their family to Wakō, Japan, and began working at the particle accelerator facility in RIKEN. There, Konstantin graduated from a public Japanese elementary school, later attending a Russian embassy-based school and studying the martial art Gōjū-ryū.

In late 1999, at age 13, Konstantin Batygin moved to Morgan Hill, California, along with his family. He chose to attend the University of California, Santa Cruz (UCSC) for the beach and the chance to keep playing in his rock band, The Seventh Season. During his sophomore year as an undergraduate, he met Gregory P. Laughlin, and afterwards they began working together on the Solar System’s long-term dynamical evolution. In June 2008, he graduated with a B.S. degree in Astrophysics, winning the Loren Steck Award for his thesis, "The Dynamical Stability of the Solar System". Batygin subsequently obtained a Ph.D. degree in Planetary Science in 2012 from California Institute of Technology.

== Career ==
After his Ph.D., Batygin held postdoctoral positions at the Observatoire de la Côte d'Azur in Nice and at Harvard's Institute for Theory and Computation. He joined the Caltech faculty as an assistant professor in 2014 and was promoted to professor in 2019. Outside science, he is the lead singer and guitarist of the rock band The Seventh Season.

Batygin's research is primarily aimed at understanding the formation and evolution of planetary systems. In 2010, he and David J. Stevenson published a calculation, which showed that hot Jupiters can become inflated as a consequence of Ohmic dissipation of electrical currents induced through an interaction between ionized atmospheric winds and the planetary magnetic field. In 2012, Batygin demonstrated that misalignments between stellar spin-axes and planetary orbits can arise from gravitational perturbations exerted onto protoplanetary disks by primordial companions stars. In 2015, Batygin and Laughlin hypothesized that the Solar System once possessed a population of short-period planets that were destroyed by Jupiter's migration through the solar nebula. In January 2016, Batygin and Michael E. Brown proposed the existence of a ninth planet in the Solar System. In 2018, Batygin showed that the evolution of astrophysical disks can be modeled with the Schrödinger equation, a fundamental equation in quantum mechanics. He has appeared as himself in multiple television documentaries including the NOVA, the 2019 miniseries The Planets, as well as in several episodes of the Science Channel series How the Universe Works.

His more recent work has addressed the formation of giant planets and their moons, the origin of rocky planets, and the long-term fate of the Solar System. In 2018, he proposed that magnetic coupling between a young giant planet and its circumplanetary disk slows the planet's rotation, offering an explanation for why Jupiter and Saturn spin well below their break-up rates. In 2020, Batygin and Alessandro Morbidelli presented a model in which the Galilean moons formed from millimeter-sized icy grains trapped in the disk of gas and dust surrounding the young Jupiter. In 2023, they proposed that super-Earths, the most common type of planet in the galaxy, form within narrow rings of rocky planetesimals, attributing the absence of short-period super-Earths in the Solar System to the comparatively low mass of its own ring. In 2025, Batygin and Fred C. Adams used the orbits of Jupiter's small inner moons Amalthea and Thebe to infer that, about 3.8 million years after the first solids formed in the Solar System, Jupiter was roughly twice its present radius and had a magnetic field about 50 times stronger than today's. In 2026, Batygin, Jim Fuller and Adams argued that episodic, asymmetric mass loss from the dying Sun would likely destabilize the outer planets within about a billion years of its becoming a white dwarf.

== See also ==
- List of astronomers
