= Trans-Neptunian object =

Solar system objects beyond Neptune

A trans-Neptunian object (TNO), also written transneptunian object, is any minor planet in the Solar System that orbits the Sun at a greater average distance than Neptune, which has an orbital semi-major axis of 30.1 astronomical units (AU).

Typically, TNOs are further divided into the classical and resonant objects of the Kuiper belt, the scattered disc and detached objects with the sednoids being the most distant ones. (Note: The literature is inconsistent in the use of the phrases "scattered disc" and "Kuiper belt". For some, they are distinct populations; for others, the scattered disk is part of the Kuiper belt, in which case the low-eccentricity population is called the "classical Kuiper belt". Authors may even switch between these two uses in a single publication.) As of February 2025, the catalog of minor planets contains 1006 numbered and more than 4000 unnumbered TNOs. However, nearly 5900 objects with semimajor axis over 30 AU are present in the MPC catalog, with 1009 being numbered.

The first trans-Neptunian object to be discovered was Pluto in 1930. It took until 1992 to discover a second trans-Neptunian object orbiting the Sun directly, 15760 Albion. The most massive TNO known is Eris, followed by Pluto, Haumea, Makemake, and Gonggong. More than 80 satellites have been discovered in orbit of trans-Neptunian objects. TNOs vary in color and are either grey-blue (BB) or very red (RR), with classes in between (BR and IR). They are thought to be composed of mixtures of rock, amorphous carbon and volatile ices such as water and methane, coated with tholins and other organic compounds.

There are more than a dozen minor planets with a semi-major axis greater than 150 AU and perihelion greater than 30 AU. Such objects are called extreme trans-Neptunian objects (ETNOs).

== History ==
=== Discovery of Pluto ===
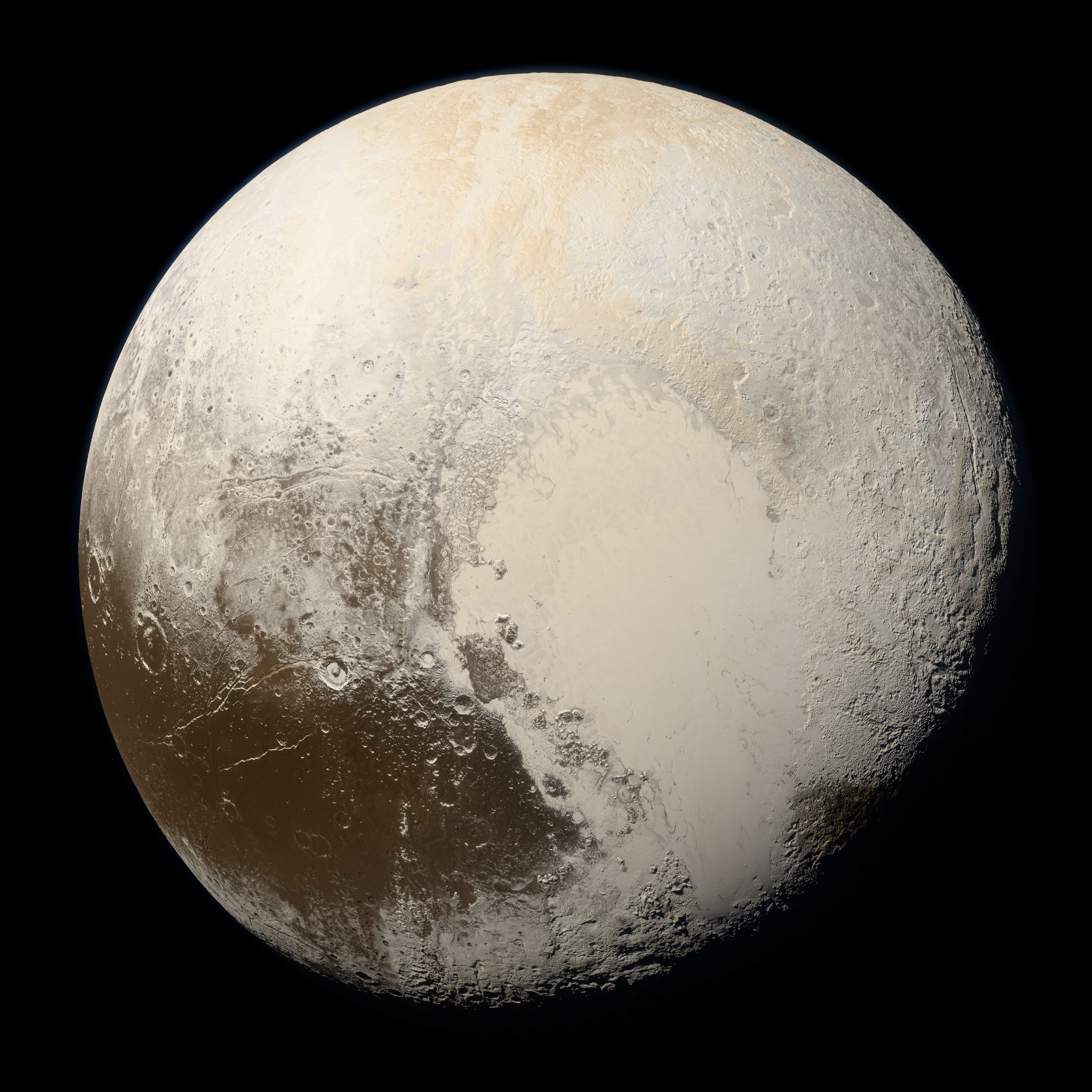
Pluto, the first known TNO, imaged by New Horizons in 2015.

The orbit of each of the planets is slightly affected by the gravitational influences of the other planets. Discrepancies in the early 1900s between the observed and expected orbits of Uranus and Neptune suggested that there were one or more additional planets beyond Neptune. The search for these led to the discovery of Pluto in February 1930, which was progressively determined to be too small to explain the discrepancies. Revised estimates of Neptune's mass from the Voyager 2 flyby in 1989 showed that there is no real discrepancy: The problem was an error in the expectations for the orbits. Pluto was easiest to find because it is the brightest of all known trans-Neptunian objects. It also has a lower inclination to the ecliptic than most other large TNOs, so its position in the sky is typically closer to the search zone in the disc of the Solar System.

=== Subsequent discoveries ===
After Pluto's discovery, American astronomer Clyde Tombaugh continued searching for some years for similar objects but found none. For a long time, no one searched for other TNOs as it was generally believed that Pluto, which up to August 2006 was classified as a planet, was the only major object beyond Neptune. Only after the 1992 discovery of a second TNO, 15760 Albion, did systematic searches for further such objects begin. A broad strip of the sky around the ecliptic was photographed and digitally evaluated for slowly moving objects. Hundreds of TNOs were found, with diameters in the range of 50 to 2,500 kilometers. Eris, the most massive known TNO, was discovered in 2005, revisiting a long-running dispute within the scientific community over the classification of large TNOs, and whether objects like Pluto can be considered planets. In 2006, Pluto and Eris were classified as dwarf planets by the International Astronomical Union.

== Classification ==
According to their distance from the Sun and their orbital parameters, TNOs are classified in two large groups: the Kuiper belt objects (KBOs) and the scattered disc objects (SDOs). The diagram below illustrates the distribution of known trans-Neptunian objects beyond the orbit of Neptune at 30.07 AU. Different classes of TNOs are represented in different colours. The main part of the Kuiper belt is shown in orange and blue between the 2:3 and 1:2 orbital resonances with Neptune. Plutinos (orange) are the objects in the 2:3 resonance, including the dwarf planets Pluto and Orcus. Classical Kuiper belt objects are shown in blue, with the largest of these, including Haumea, Makemake, and Quaoar in the dynamically 'hot' population in light blue, and the dynamically 'cold' population, including 486958 Arrokoth, in low-eccentricity orbits clustered near 44 AU in dark blue.

The scattered disc can be found beyond the Kuiper belt, shown in grey and purple. These objects, including dwarf planets Eris and Gonggong have been excited into eccentric orbits due to gravitational perturbations by Neptune, resulting in a concentration of their perihelia in the horizontal band between 30 and 40 AU. Some detached objects, such as (612911) 2004 XR190 however have higher perihelia. Centaurs, shown in green, have been perturbed from the scattered disc onto orbits crossing the outer planets. Bodies in both of these groups may be found in mean-motion resonances with Neptune; these are plotted in red.

Finally, extreme trans-Neptunian objects are shown at the right of the diagram, with many having orbits that extend over 1000 AU from the sun. These can be divided into the extended scattered disc (pink), including 768325 Geyagugv, the distant detached objects (brown), including 2017 OF201, and the four known sednoids, including Sedna and 541132 Leleākūhonua.

Distribution of trans-Neptunian objects, with semi-major axis on the horizontal, and perihelion on the vertical axis. Scattered disc objects occupy the wide horizontal region in grey and purple, while objects that are in resonance with Neptune are in red. Extreme trans-Neptunian objects and sednoids are in pink, brown, and yellow. Finally, the classical Kuiper belt is in blue.

=== KBOs ===
The Edgeworth–Kuiper belt contains objects with an average distance to the Sun of 30 to about 55 AU, usually having close-to-circular orbits with a small inclination from the ecliptic. Edgeworth–Kuiper belt objects are further classified into the resonant trans-Neptunian object that are locked in an orbital resonance with Neptune, and the classical Kuiper belt objects, also called "cubewanos", that have no such resonance, moving on almost circular orbits, unperturbed by Neptune. There are a large number of resonant subgroups, the largest being the twotinos (1:2 resonance) and the plutinos (2:3 resonance), named after their most prominent member, Pluto. Members of the classical Edgeworth–Kuiper belt include 15760 Albion, Quaoar and Makemake.

Another subclass of Kuiper belt objects is the so-called scattering objects (SO). These are non-resonant objects that come near enough to Neptune to have their orbits changed from time to time (such as causing changes in semi-major axis of at least 1.5 AU in 10 million years) and are thus undergoing gravitational scattering. Scattering objects are easier to detect than other trans-Neptunian objects of the same size because they come nearer to Earth, some having perihelia around 20 AU. Several are known with g-band absolute magnitude below 9, meaning that the estimated diameter is more than 100 km. It is estimated that there are between 240,000 and 830,000 scattering objects bigger than r-band absolute magnitude 12, corresponding to diameters greater than about 18 km. Scattering objects are hypothesized to be the source of the so-called Jupiter-family comets (JFCs), which have periods of less than 20 years.

=== SDOs ===
The scattered disc contains objects farther from the Sun, with very eccentric and inclined orbits. These orbits are non-resonant and non-planetary-orbit-crossing. A typical example is the most-massive-known TNO, Eris. Based on the Tisserand parameter relative to Neptune (T_{N}), the objects in the scattered disc can be further divided into the "typical" scattered disc objects (SDOs, Scattered-near) with a T_{N} of less than 3, and into the detached objects (ESDOs, Scattered-extended) with a T_{N} greater than 3. In addition, detached objects have a time-averaged eccentricity greater than 0.2 The sednoids are a further extreme sub-grouping of the detached objects with perihelia so distant that it is confirmed that their orbits cannot be explained by perturbations from the giant planets, nor by interaction with the galactic tides. However, a passing star could have moved them on their orbit.

== Physical characteristics ==
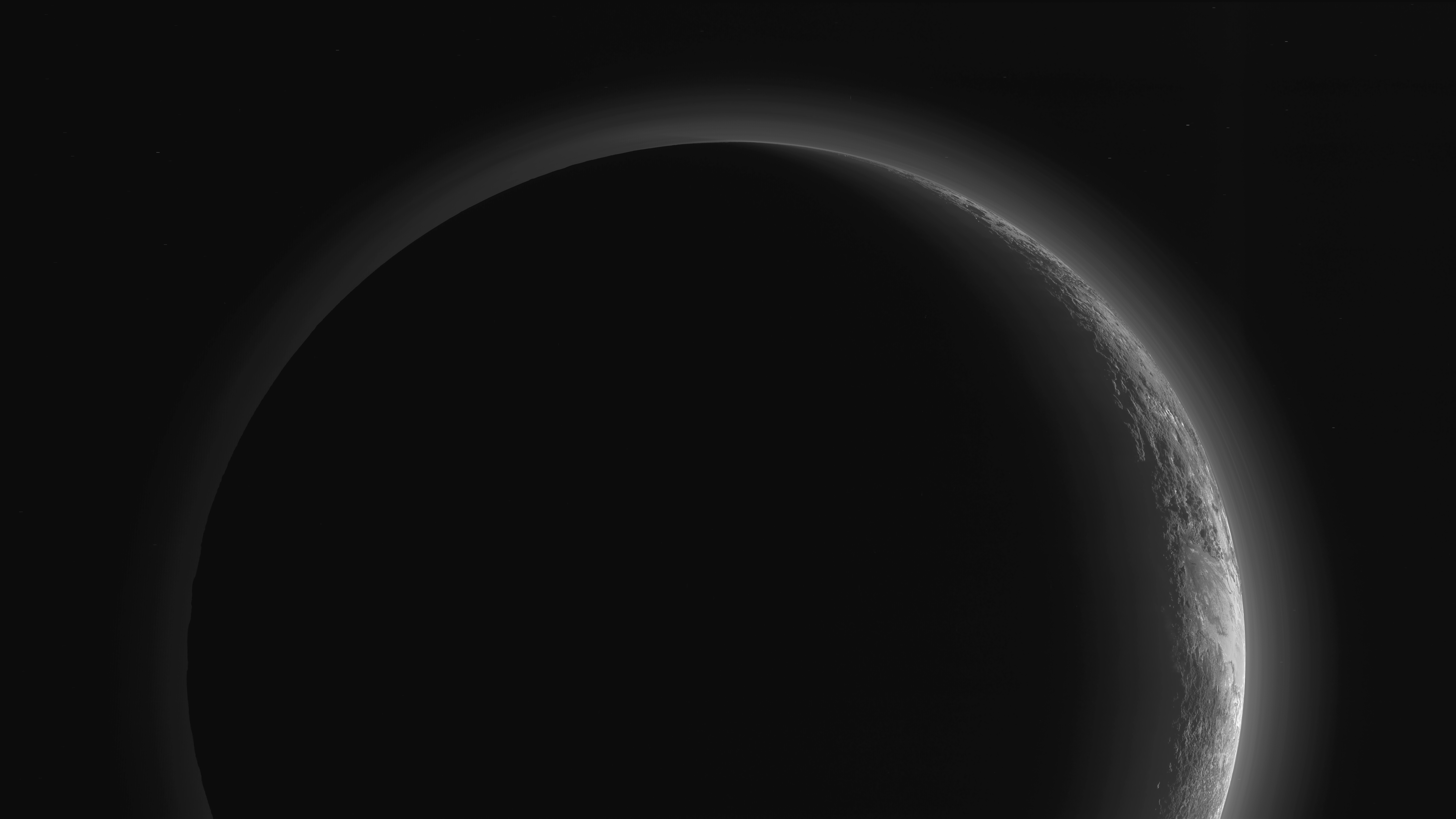
Looking back at Pluto, the largest visited KBO so far

Given the apparent magnitude (>20) of all but the biggest trans-Neptunian objects, the physical studies are limited to the following:

- thermal emissions for the largest objects (see size determination)
- colour indices, i.e. comparisons of the apparent magnitudes using different filters
- analysis of spectra, visual and infrared

Studying colours and spectra provides insight into the objects' origin and a potential correlation with other classes of objects, namely centaurs and some satellites of giant planets (Triton, Phoebe), suspected to originate in the Kuiper belt. However, the interpretations are typically ambiguous as the spectra can fit more than one model of the surface composition and depend on the unknown particle size. More significantly, the optical surfaces of small bodies are subject to modification by intense radiation, solar wind and micrometeorites. Consequently, the thin optical surface layer could be quite different from the regolith underneath, and not representative of the bulk composition of the body.

Small TNOs are thought to be low-density mixtures of rock and ice with some organic (carbon-containing) surface material such as tholins, detected in their spectra. On the other hand, the high density of Haumea, 2.6–3.3 g/cm^{3}, suggests a very high non-ice content (compare with Pluto's density: 1.86 g/cm^{3}). The composition of some small TNOs could be similar to that of comets. Indeed, some centaurs undergo seasonal changes when they approach the Sun, making the boundary blurred (see 2060 Chiron and 60558 Echeclus). However, population comparisons between centaurs and TNOs are still controversial.

=== Color indices ===
Comparison of sizes, albedos, and colors of various large trans-Neptunian objects with sizes of >700 km. The light and dark colored arcs represent uncertainties of the object's size.

Colour indices are simple measures of the differences in the apparent magnitude of an object seen through blue (B), visible (V), i.e. green-yellow, and red (R) filters. Correlations between the colours and the orbital characteristics have been studied, to confirm theories of different origin of the different dynamic classes:

- Classical Kuiper belt objects (cubewanos) seem to be composed of two different colour populations: the so-called cold (inclination <5°) population, displaying only red colours, and the so-called hot (higher inclination) population displaying the whole range of colours from blue to very red. A recent analysis based on the data from Deep Ecliptic Survey confirms this difference in colour between low-inclination (named Core) and high-inclination (named Halo) objects. Red colours of the Core objects together with their unperturbed orbits suggest that these objects could be a relic of the original population of the belt.
- Scattered disc objects show colour resemblances with hot classical objects pointing to a common origin.

While the relatively dimmer bodies, as well as the population as the whole, are reddish (V−I = 0.3–0.6), the bigger objects are often more neutral in colour (infrared index V−I < 0.2). This distinction leads to suggestion that the surface of the largest bodies is covered with ices, hiding the redder, darker areas underneath.

Mean-color indices of dynamical groups in the outer Solar System
| Color | Plutinos | Cubewanos | Centaurs | SDOs | Comets | Jupiter trojans |
|---|---|---|---|---|---|---|
| B–V | 0.895±0.190 | 0.973±0.174 | 0.886±0.213 | 0.875±0.159 | 0.795±0.035 | 0.777±0.091 |
| V–R | 0.568±0.106 | 0.622±0.126 | 0.573±0.127 | 0.553±0.132 | 0.441±0.122 | 0.445±0.048 |
| V–I | 1.095±0.201 | 1.181±0.237 | 1.104±0.245 | 1.070±0.220 | 0.935±0.141 | 0.861±0.090 |
| R–I | 0.536±0.135 | 0.586±0.148 | 0.548±0.150 | 0.517±0.102 | 0.451±0.059 | 0.416±0.057 |

=== Spectral type from visible and near-infrared observations ===
Among TNOs, as among centaurs, there is a wide range of colors from blue-grey (neutral) to very red, but unlike the centaurs, bimodally grouped into grey and red centaurs, the distribution for TNOs appears to be uniform. The wide range of spectra differ in reflectivity in visible red and near infrared. Neutral objects present a flat spectrum, reflecting as much red and infrared as visible spectrum. Very red objects present a steep slope, reflecting much more in red and infrared. A recent attempt at classification (common with centaurs) uses the total of four classes from BB (blue, or neutral color, average B−V = 0.70, V−R = 0.39, e.g. Orcus) to RR (very red, B−V = 1.08, V−R = 0.71, e.g. Sedna) with BR and IR as intermediate classes. BR (intermediate blue-red) and IR (moderately red) differ mostly in the infrared bands I, J and H.

Typical models of the surface include water ice, amorphous carbon, silicates and organic macromolecules, named tholins, created by intense radiation. Four major tholins are used to fit the reddening slope:

- Titan tholin, believed to be produced from a mixture of 90% N_{2} (nitrogen) and 10% CH_{4} (methane)
- Triton tholin, as above but with very low (0.1%) methane content
- (ethane) Ice tholin I, believed to be produced from a mixture of 86% H_{2}O and 14% C_{2}H_{6} (ethane)
- (methanol) Ice tholin II, 80% H_{2}O, 16% CH_{3}OH (methanol) and 3% CO_{2}

As an illustration of the two extreme classes BB and RR, the following compositions have been suggested

- for Sedna (RR very red): 24% Triton tholin, 7% carbon, 10% N_{2}, 26% methanol, and 33% methane
- for Orcus (BB, grey/blue): 85% amorphous carbon, +4% Titan tholin, and 11% H_{2}O ice

=== Spectral types after the James Webb Space Telescope ===
Recent observations with the James Webb Space Telescope (JWST), and in particular its high sensitivity with the NIRSpec instrument in the 0.7–5.3 μm range, have led to a new spectral classification for trans-Neptunian objects (TNOs). This classification is based on the Discovering the Surface Composition of TNOs (DiSCo) Large program and, for the first time, incorporates not only spectral profiles but also how they relate to the surface composition of TNOs. Additionally to the discovery of species that had not been detected before, the most significant discoveries from the spectral study of TNOs with Webb is the prevalence of CO_{2} on the surface for TNOs, independently of the size, albedo, and color and the non-prevalence of water ice, clearly present only in 20% of the sample.

The DiSCo compositional classes show three distinct groups:

- Bowl-type: the only class with a clear absorption features of water ice all over the NIRSPEC spectral range, accompanied by silicates and some carbon dioxide (CO_{2}). Due to the high presence of refractory material on the surface these objects show the lowest geometric albedo in the population.
- Double-Dip: reddish objects in the visible with spectra dominated by CO_{2} (including the isotopologue ^{13}CO_{2}) and carbon monoxide (CO) The non-icy surface component is probably dominated by tholins with aliphatic stretching absorptions at 3.2 - 3.5 μm.
- Cliff: the reddest objects below 1.2 μm, with chemically evolved surfaces dominated by methanol, CO_{2}, CO, and irradiation byproducts of methanol bearing −OH, −CH and −NH groups. These spectra also display additional complex bands, likely associated with OCN^{−} and OCS.

The distribution of these groups shows no clear relation with physical parameters or dynamical class, except for the color in the visible and the fact that all cold classical TNOs belong to the Cliff class. These three groups are also reproduced, with some differences, in centaurs (including active ones such as Chiron), in Neptune trojans, and in ETNOs, making them a useful reference for icy bodies throughout the Solar System. Similarities have also been noted with debris disk spectra.

As expected given their peculiar compositions, the dwarf planets Eris and Makemake do not fall into any of these groups. The same is true for large (~1000 km) dwarf planet candidates such as Quaoar, Gonggong, and Sedna, which show distinctive spectral profiles with irradiation products of methane.

=== Size determination and distribution ===
Size comparison between the Moon, Neptune's moon Triton, Pluto, several large TNOs, and the dwarf planet Ceres. Their respective shapes are not represented.

Characteristically, big (bright) objects are typically on inclined orbits, whereas the invariable plane mostly contains small and dim objects in the cold classical belt.

It is difficult to estimate the diameter of TNOs. For very large objects, with very well known orbital elements (like Pluto), diameters can be precisely measured by occultation of stars. For other large TNOs, diameters can be estimated by thermal measurements. The intensity of light illuminating the object is known (from its distance to the Sun), and one assumes that most of its surface is in thermal equilibrium (usually not a bad assumption for an airless body). For a known albedo, it is possible to estimate the surface temperature, and correspondingly the intensity of heat radiation. Further, if the size of the object is known, it is possible to predict both the amount of visible light and emitted heat radiation reaching Earth. A simplifying factor is that the Sun emits almost all of its energy in visible light and at nearby frequencies, while at the cold temperatures of TNOs, the heat radiation is emitted at completely different wavelengths (the far infrared).

Thus there are two unknowns (albedo and size), which can be determined by two independent measurements (of the amount of reflected light and emitted infrared heat radiation). TNOs are so far from the Sun that they are very cold, hence producing black-body radiation around 60 micrometres in wavelength. This wavelength of light is impossible to observe from the Earth's surface, but can be observed from space using, e.g. the Spitzer Space Telescope. For ground-based observations, astronomers observe the tail of the black-body radiation in the far infrared. This far infrared radiation is so dim that the thermal method is only applicable to the largest KBOs. For the majority of (small) objects, the diameter is estimated by assuming an albedo. However, the albedos found range from 0.50 down to 0.05, resulting in a size range of 1,200–3,700 km for an object of magnitude of 1.0.

== Notable objects ==
| Object | Description |
|---|---|
| 134340 Pluto | A dwarf planet, the first and largest trans-Neptunian object (TNO) discovered. It was the first TNO found to have an atmosphere. Hosts a system of five satellites and is the prototype plutino. |
| 15760 Albion | The prototype classical Kuiper belt object (KBO), and the first TNO discovered after Pluto. |
| (385185) 1993 RO | The next plutino discovered after Pluto. |
| (15874) 1996 TL66 | The first object identified as a scattered disc object. |
| 1998 WW31 | The first binary KBO discovered after Pluto. |
| 47171 Lempo | A plutino and triple system consisting of a central binary pair of similar size, and a third outer circumbinary satellite. |
| 20000 Varuna | A large classical KBO, known for its rapid rotation (6.3 h) and elongated shape. |
| 28978 Ixion | A large plutino, was considered to be among the largest KBOs upon discovery. |
| 2001 QW322 | The widest known binary system in the Kuiper belt. |
| 50000 Quaoar | A dwarf planet and a large classical KBO. It has an elongated shape, albeit less elongated than Haumea. It has one known moon, Weywot, and two known rings that are both outside Quaoar's Roche limit. |
| (612533) 2002 XV93 | A medium-sized plutino that was found to have an extremely thin atmosphere based on occultation results, making it the second object in the Kuiper belt confirmed to have an atmosphere. |
| 90377 Sedna | A distant dwarf planet, proposed for a new category named extended scattered disc (E-SDO), detached objects, distant detached objects (DDO) or scattered-extended in the formal classification by DES. |
| 90482 Orcus | A dwarf planet and the second-largest known plutino, after Pluto. Has a relatively large satellite, Vanth. |
| 136108 Haumea | A dwarf planet, the third-largest-known TNO. Notable for its two known satellites, rings, and unusually short rotation period (3.9 h). It is the most massive known member of the Haumea collisional family. |
| 136472 Makemake | A dwarf planet, a classical KBO, and the fourth-largest known TNO. |
| 136199 Eris | A dwarf planet, a scattered disc object, and currently the most massive known TNO. It has one known satellite, Dysnomia. |
| (612911) 2004 XR190 | A detached object whose orbit is highly inclined and lies outside the classical Kuiper belt. |
| 225088 Gonggong | A dwarf planet and the second-largest discovered scattered-disc object. Has one known satellite, Xiangliu. |
| (528219) 2008 KV42 | The first retrograde TNO, having an unusually high orbital inclination of 104°. |
| 471325 Taowu | Another retrograde TNO with an unusually high orbital inclination of 110°. |
| 2012 VP113 | A sednoid with a large perihelion of 80 AU from the Sun (50 AU beyond Neptune). |
| 486958 Arrokoth | A contact binary classical KBO encountered by the New Horizons spacecraft in 2019. |
| 2018 VG18 | A scattered disc object, and the first TNO discovered while beyond 100 AU (15 billion km) from the Sun. |
| 2018 AG37 | The most distant observable TNO at 132 AU (19.7 billion km) from the Sun. |

== Exploration ==
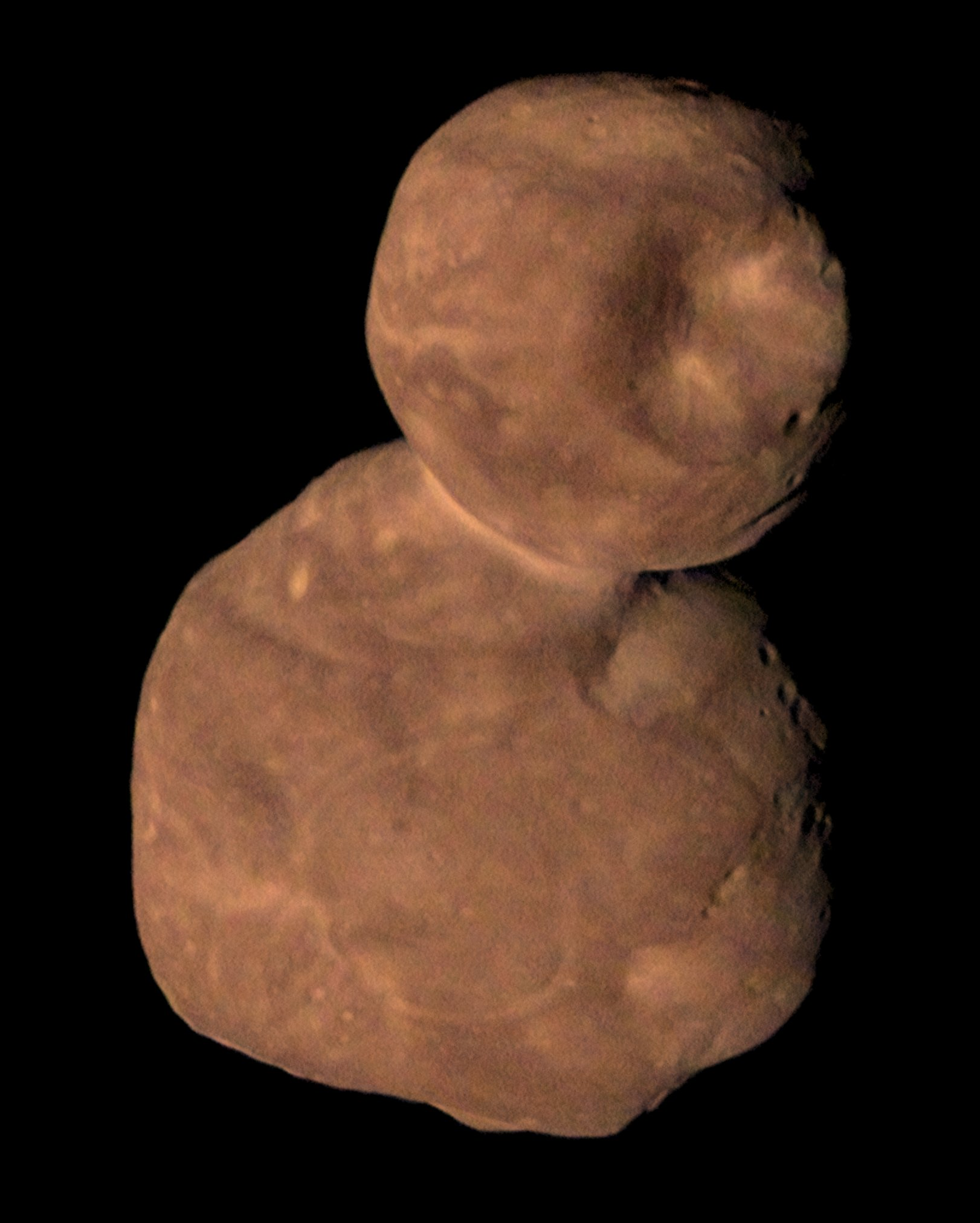
Kuiper belt object 486958 Arrokoth, in images taken by the New Horizons spacecraft

The only mission to date that primarily targeted a trans-Neptunian object was NASA's New Horizons, which was launched in January 2006 and flew by the Pluto system in July 2015 and 486958 Arrokoth in January 2019.

A wide range of architectures is available for missions to TNOs, trading off transit time, scientific merit, Earth departure energy and cost, propulsion system design, possible exposure to damaging radiation during Jupiter flyby, and other factors. In 2011, a design study explored a spacecraft survey of Quaoar, Sedna, Makemake, Haumea, and Eris.

In 2019 one mission to TNOs included designs for orbital capture and multi-target scenarios.

Some TNOs that were studied in a design study paper were Uni, 1998 WW31, and Lempo.

The existence of planets beyond Neptune, ranging from less than an Earth mass (Sub-Earth) up to a brown dwarf has been often postulated for different theoretical reasons to explain several observed or speculated features of the Kuiper belt and the Oort cloud. It was recently proposed to use ranging data from the New Horizons spacecraft to constrain the position of such a hypothesized body.

NASA has been working towards a dedicated Interstellar Precursor in the 21st century, one intentionally designed to reach the interstellar medium, and as part of this the flyby of objects like Sedna are also considered. Overall this type of spacecraft studies have proposed a launch in the 2020s, and would try to go a little faster than the Voyagers using existing technology. One 2018 design study for an Interstellar Precursor, included a visit of the minor planet (or dwarf planet) 50000 Quaoar, in the 2030s.

== Extreme trans-Neptunian objects ==
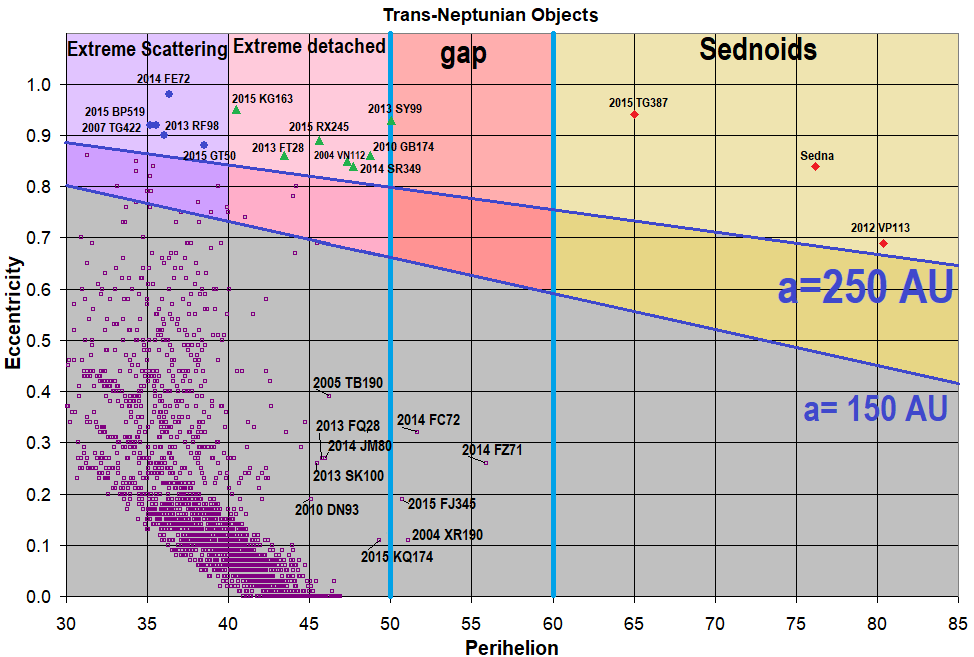
Overview of trans-Neptunian objects with extreme TNOs grouped into three categories at the top.

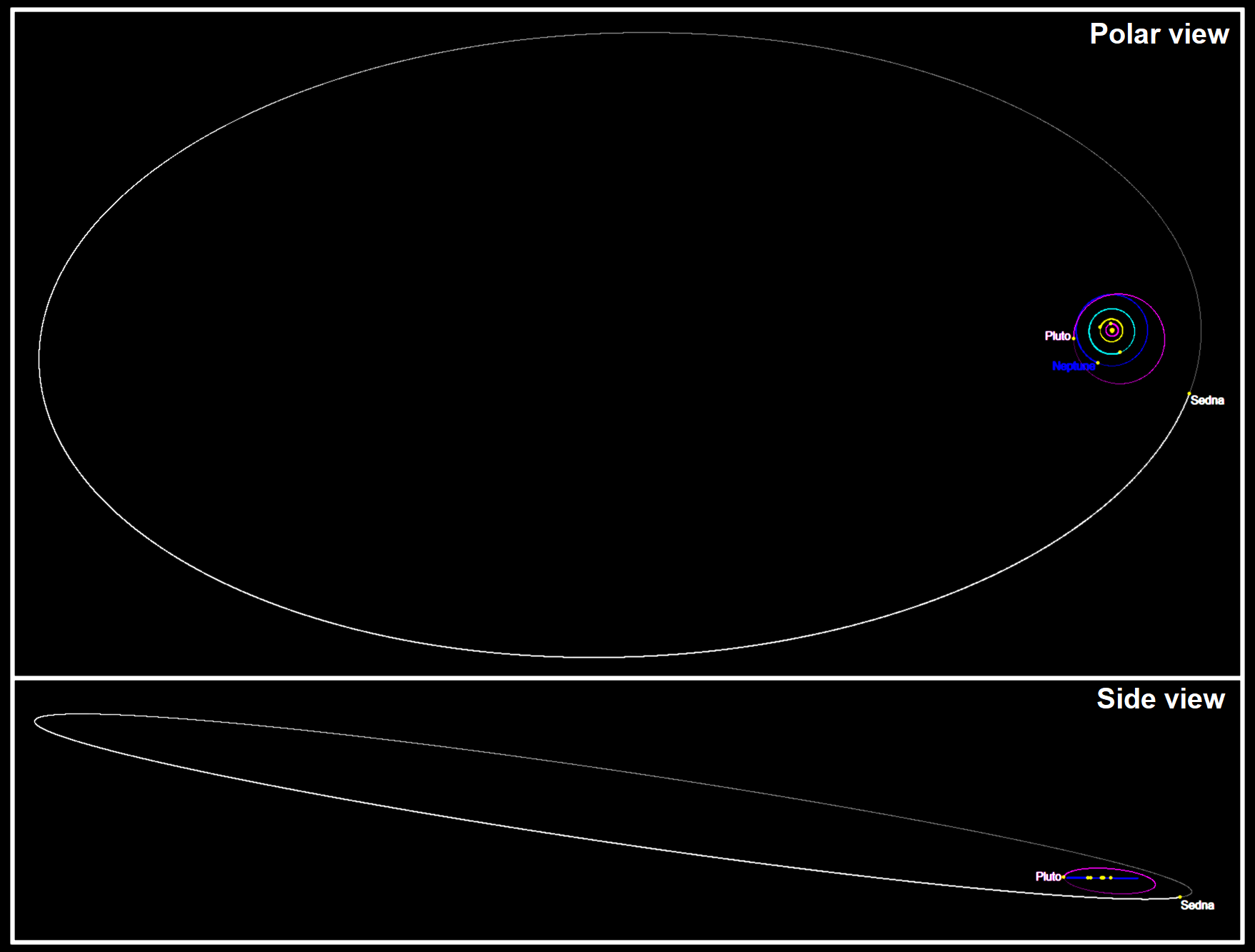
Sedna's orbit takes it far beyond even the Kuiper belt (30–50 AU), out to nearly 1,000 AU (Sun–Earth distance)

Among the extreme trans-Neptunian objects are high-perihelion objects classified as sednoids, four of which have been confirmed: 90377 Sedna, 2012 VP113, 541132 Leleākūhonua, and 2023 KQ14. They are distant detached objects with perihelia greater than 70 AU. Their high perihelia keep them at a sufficient distance to avoid significant gravitational perturbations from Neptune. Previous explanations for the high perihelion of Sedna include a close encounter with an unknown planet on a distant orbit and a distant encounter with a random star or a member of the Sun's birth cluster that passed near the Solar System.

== See also ==
- Dwarf planet
- Mesoplanet
- Nemesis (hypothetical star)
- Planet Nine
- Sednoid
- Small Solar System body
- Trans-Neptunian planets in fiction
- Trans-Neptunian spectral types
- Triton
- Tyche (hypothetical planet)
