= Sednoid =

Group of trans-Neptunian objects

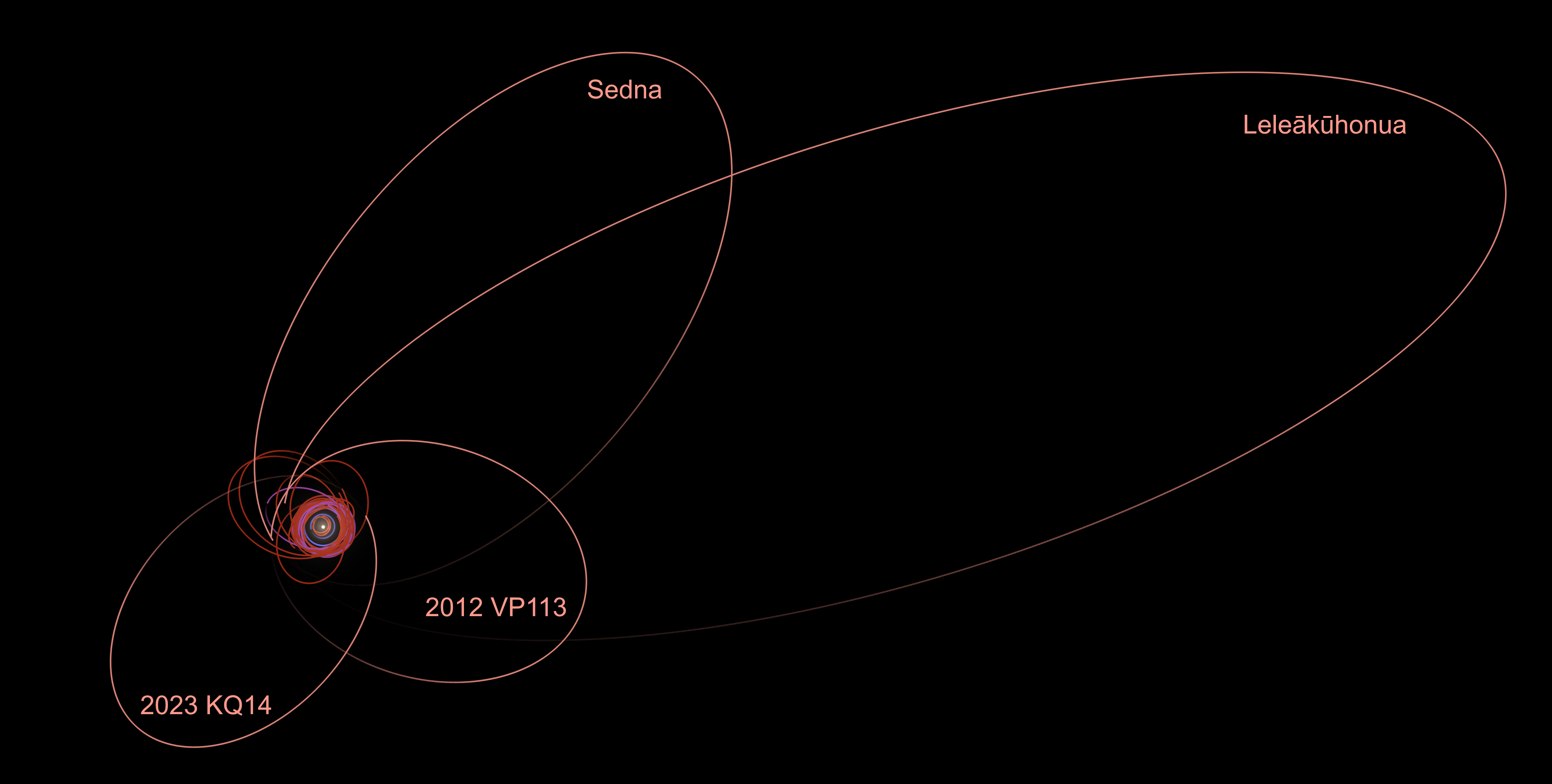
The orbits of the four known sednoids (colored pink). Their orbits are so distant that they never cross the Kuiper belt (shown in red).

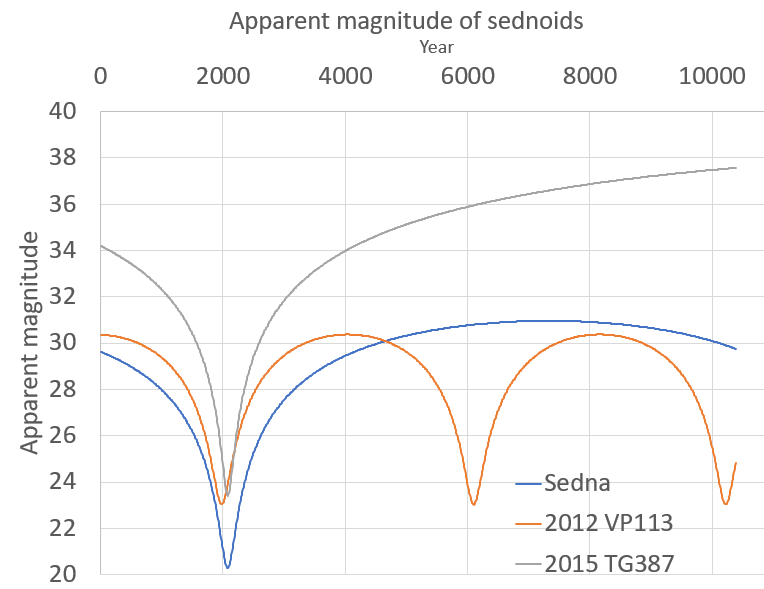
The apparent magnitudes of three of four known sednoids.

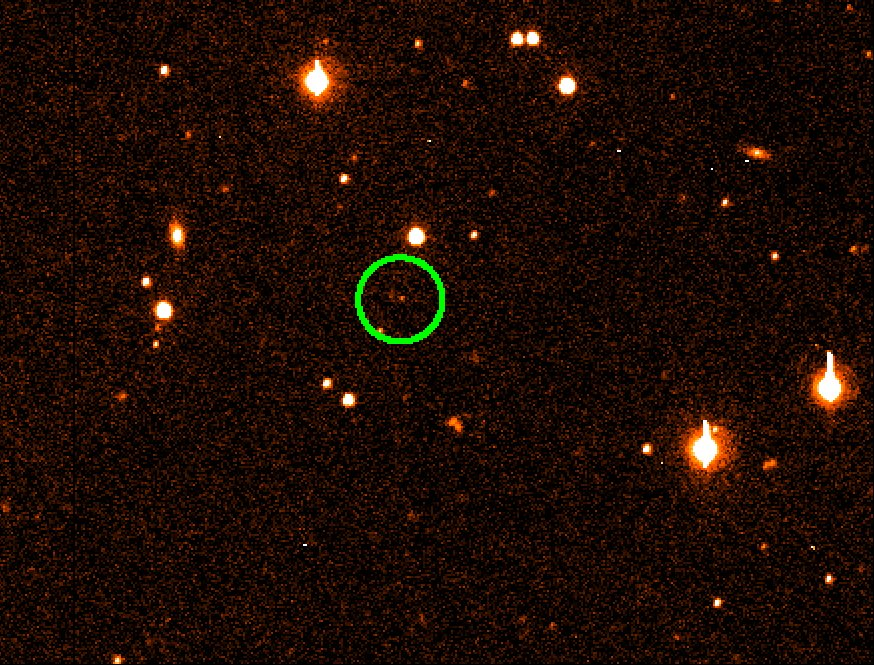
Discovery image of Sedna, the eponymous and first known sednoid

A sednoid is a trans-Neptunian object with a large semi-major axis, a distant perihelion and a highly eccentric orbit, similar to that of the dwarf planet Sedna. The consensus among astronomers is that there are only four objects that are generally agreed to belong to this population: Sedna, 2012 VP113 ("Biden"), 541132 Leleākūhonua, and 2023 KQ14 ("Ammonite"). All four have perihelia greater than 60 AU. The sednoids are also classified as detached objects, since their perihelion distances are large enough that Neptune's gravity does not strongly influence their orbits. Some astronomers consider the sednoids to be Inner Oort Cloud (IOC) objects. The inner Oort cloud, or Hills cloud, lies at 1,000–10,000 AU from the Sun.

One attempt at a precise definition of sednoids is any body with a perihelion greater than 50 AU and a semi-major axis greater than 150 AU. However, this definition applies to the objects 2013 SY99, 2020 MQ53, and 2021 RR205 which have perihelia beyond 50 AU and semi-major axes over 700 AU. Despite this, most astronomers do not classify these objects as sednoids because their orbits still experience gradual orbital migration as a result of perturbations by galactic tides and Neptune's weak gravitational influence.

With their high eccentricities (greater than ~0.7), sednoids are distinguished from the high-perihelion objects with moderate eccentricities that are not affected by perturbations from Neptune, namely 2015 KQ174, 2015 FJ345, (612911) 2004 XR190 ("Buffy"), (690420) 2014 FC72 and 2014 FZ71.

== Unexplained orbits ==
The sednoids' orbits cannot be explained by perturbations from the giant planets, nor by interaction with the galactic tides. If they formed in their current locations, their orbits must originally have been circular; otherwise accretion (the coalescence of smaller bodies into larger ones) would not have been possible because the large relative velocities between planetesimals would have been too disruptive. Their present elliptical orbits can be explained by several hypotheses:

1. These objects could have had their orbits and perihelion distances "lifted" by the passage of a nearby star when the Sun was still embedded in its birth star cluster.
2. They could have been captured from around passing stars, most likely in the Sun's birth cluster.
3. Their orbits could have been disrupted by an as-yet-unknown planet-sized body beyond the Kuiper belt such as the hypothesized Planet Nine.
4. Their perihelion distances could have been "lifted" by a temporarily-present rogue planet in the early solar system.

== Known members ==
Barycentric orbital elements of known sednoids as of June 2025
Name	Semi-major axis (AU)	Perihelion (AU)	Aphelion (AU)	Eccentricity	Inclination (°)	Longitude of perihelion ϖ (°) (Note: The longitude of perihelion ϖ is defined as the sum of the longitude of ascending node Ω (measured on ecliptic plane) and the argument of periapsis ω (measured on orbital plane): $\varpi = \Omega + \omega$)	Orbital period (yr)	Diameter (km)	Abs. mag (H)	App. mag at discovery	Distance from Sun at discovery (AU)	Year discovered	Ref
90377 Sedna	506	76.2	937	0.85	11.9	95.7	11,400	906+314 −258	1.8	20.8	90	2003	
2012 VP113	262	80.5	444	0.70	24.9	24.7	4,200	450	4.0	23.2	83	2012	
541132 Leleākūhonua	1,090	65.0	2,320	0.95	11.7	59.0	41,200	220+28 −20	5.6	24.5	80	2015	
2023 KQ14	252	65.9	438	0.74	11.0	271	4,000	220–380	6.8	25.4	71	2023	

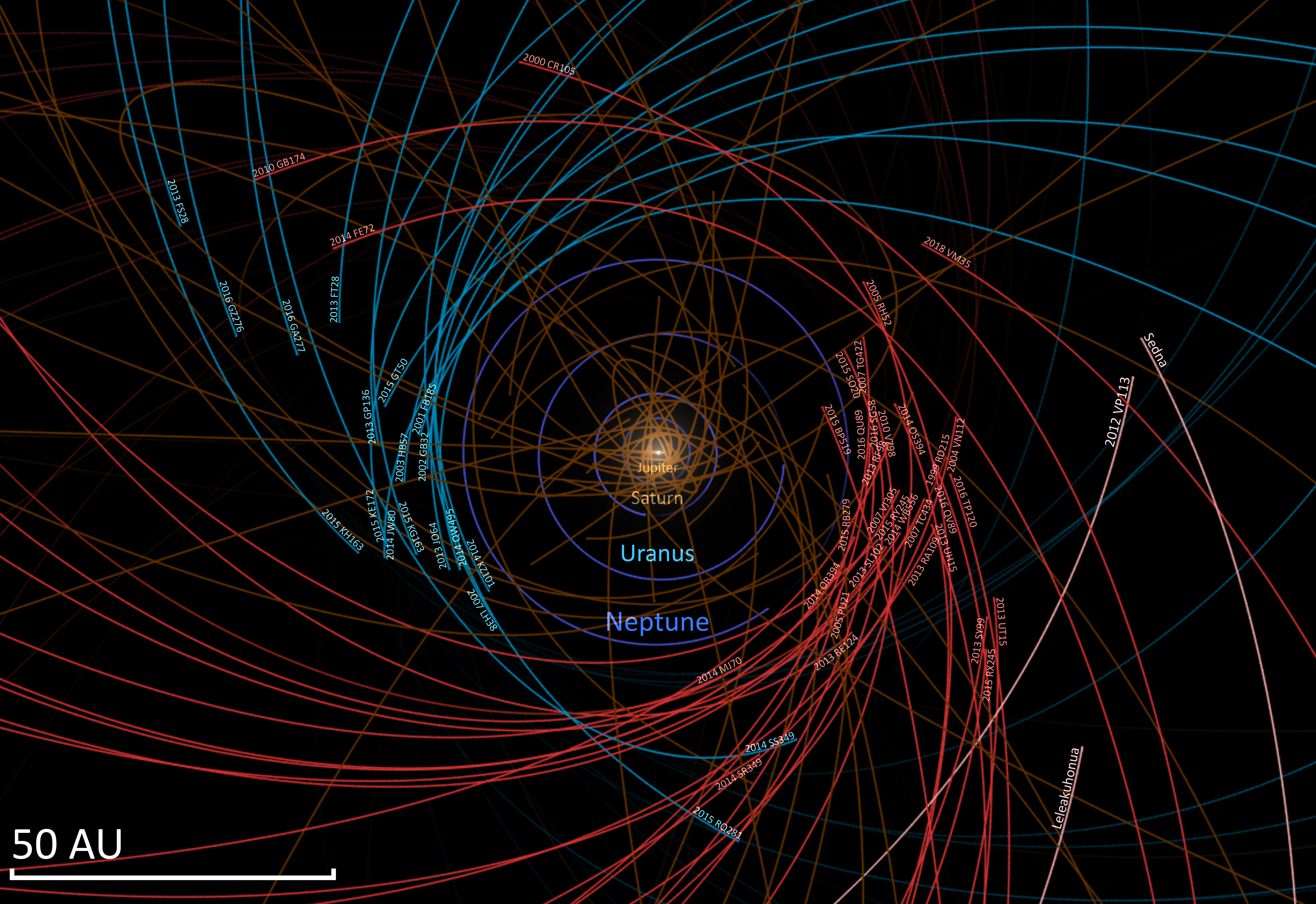
Orbits and positions of three known sednoids (labeled in pink) and various other extreme trans-Neptunian objects as of 2021

The first three known sednoids, like all of the more extreme detached objects (objects with semi-major axes > 150 AU and perihelia > 30 AU; the orbit of Neptune), have a similar orientation (argument of perihelion) of ≈ 0° (338°±38°). This is not due to an observational bias and is unexpected, because interaction with the giant planets should have randomized their arguments of perihelion (ω), with precession periods between 40 Myr and 650 Myr and 1.5 Gyr for Sedna. This suggests that one or more undiscovered massive perturbers may exist in the outer Solar System. A super-Earth at 250 AU would cause these objects to librate around ω = 0°±60° for billions of years. There are multiple possible configurations and a low-albedo super-Earth at that distance would have an apparent magnitude below the current all-sky-survey detection limits. This hypothetical super-Earth has been dubbed Planet Nine. Larger, more-distant perturbers would also be too faint to be detected.

As of 2016, 27 known objects have a semi-major axis greater than 150 AU, a perihelion beyond Neptune, an argument of perihelion of 340°±55°, and an observation arc of more than 1 year. 2013 SY99, 2014 ST373, 2015 FJ345, 2021 RW209, (612911) 2004 XR190, (690420) 2014 FC72, 2014 US277, 2014 FZ71, and 2021 RR205 are near the limit of perihelion of 50 AU, but are not considered sednoids.

On 1 October 2018, Leleākūhonua, then known as 2015 TG_{387}, was announced with perihelion of 65 AU and a semi-major axis of 1094 AU. With an aphelion over 2100 AU, it brings the object further out than Sedna.

In late 2015, V774104 was announced at the Division for Planetary Science conference as a further candidate sednoid, but its observation arc was too short to know whether its perihelion was even outside Neptune's influence. The talk about V774104 was probably meant to refer to Leleākūhonua (2015 TG_{387}) even though V774104 is the internal designation for non-sednoid 2015 TH367.

Sednoids might constitute a proper dynamical class, but they may have a heterogeneous origin; the spectral slope of 2012 VP_{113} is very different from that of Sedna.

Malena Rice and Gregory Laughlin applied a targeted shift-stacking search algorithm to analyze data from TESS sectors 18 and 19 looking for candidate outer Solar System objects. Their search recovered known objects like Sedna and produced 17 new outer Solar System body candidates located at geocentric distances in the range 80–200 AU, that need follow-up observations with ground-based telescope resources for confirmation. Early results from a survey with the William Herschel Telescope aimed at recovering these distant TNO candidates have failed to confirm two of them.

== Theoretical population ==
Each of the proposed mechanisms for Sedna's extreme orbit would leave a distinct mark on the structure and dynamics of any wider population. If a trans-Neptunian planet were responsible, all such objects would share roughly the same perihelion (≈80 AU). If Sedna had been captured from another planetary system that rotated in the same direction as the Solar System, then all of its population would have orbits on relatively low inclinations and have semi-major axes ranging from 100 to 500 AU. If it rotated in the opposite direction, then two populations would form, one with low and one with high inclinations. The perturbations from passing stars would produce a wide variety of perihelia and inclinations, each dependent on the number and angle of such encounters.

Acquiring a larger sample of such objects would therefore help in determining which scenario is most likely. "I call Sedna a fossil record of the earliest Solar System", said Brown in 2006. "Eventually, when other fossil records are found, Sedna will help tell us how the Sun formed and the number of stars that were close to the Sun when it formed." A 2007–2008 survey by Brown, Rabinowitz and Schwamb attempted to locate another member of Sedna's hypothetical population. Although the survey was sensitive to movement out to 1,000 AU and discovered the likely dwarf planet Gonggong, it detected no new sednoids. Subsequent simulations incorporating the new data suggested about 40 Sedna-sized objects probably exist in this region, with the brightest being about Eris's magnitude (−1.0).

Following the discovery of Leleākūhonua, Sheppard et al. concluded that it implies a population of about 2 million Inner Oort Cloud objects larger than 40 km, with a total mass in the range of 1×10^{22} kg, about the mass of Pluto and several times the mass of the asteroid belt.

== See also ==
- Trans-Neptunian objects category
- Extreme trans-Neptunian object
