= 2014 ST373 =

Detached trans-Neptunian object

2014 ST_{373}
Discovery
- Discovered by: CTIO-DECam (first observed only)
- Discovery date: 25 September 2014

Designations
- Minor planet category: TNO · detached distant

Orbital characteristics
- Epoch 31 May 2020 (JD 2459000.5)
- Uncertainty parameter 5 · 3
- Observation arc: 792 d
- Aphelion: 158.86 AU
- Perihelion: 50.20 AU
- Semi-major axis: 104.53 AU
- Eccentricity: 0.52
- Orbital period (sidereal): 1069 yr
- Mean anomaly: 353.71°
- Mean motion: 0° 0^{m} 3.24^{s} / day
- Inclination: 43.158°
- Longitude of ascending node: 130.218°
- Time of perihelion: ≈ 14 July 2039 ±4 months
- Argument of perihelion: 297.117°

Physical characteristics
- Mean diameter: 370 km (est at 0.09)
- Absolute magnitude (H): 5.4

2014 ST_{373} is a trans-Neptunian object and a detached object from the outermost region of the Solar System. With a perihelion of 50.2 AU, it belongs to the top 10 minor planets with the highest known perihelia of the Solar System, (Note: Data Base Query, at the JPL Small-Body Database: all objects with a perihelion (q) larger than 38 AU; sorted in descending order. In February 2020, 2014 ST_{373} ranks #8 among objects with the highest perihelion. Top objects in the list: (#1) 2012 VP113, (#2) 90377 Sedna, (#3) 541132 Leleākūhonua, (#4) 2014 FZ71, (#5) 2014 FC72, (#6) 2004 XR190 and (#7) 2015 FJ345.) and is neither a scattered disc nor an extreme trans-Neptunian object. It measures approximately 370 kilometers (230 miles) in diameter and was first observed on 25 September 2014, by astronomers using the Dark Energy Camera (DECam) at Cerro Tololo Inter-American Observatory in Chile.

== Orbit and classification ==
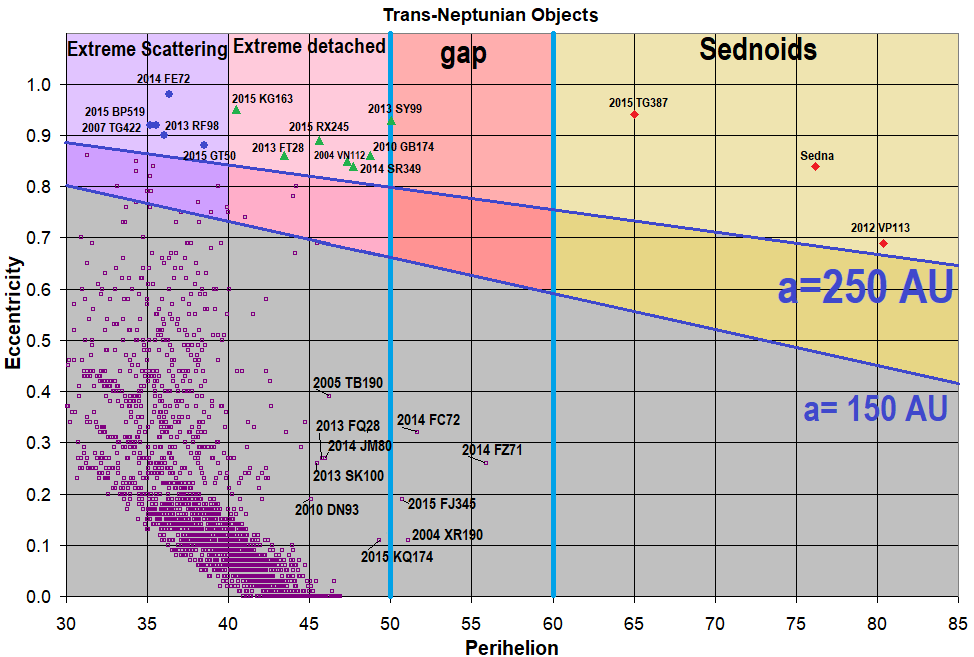
2014 ST_{373} (not displayed) is located in the "gap", a poorly understood region.

2014 ST_{373} (not displayed) is located in an virtually unpopulated region (q=50 AU and e=0.5.

2014 ST_{373} orbits the Sun at a distance of 50.2–158.9 AU once every 1069 years; semi-major axis of 104.53 AU. Its orbit has an eccentricity of 0.52 and an inclination of 43.16° with respect to the ecliptic.

2014 ST_{373} is a distant minor planet and trans-Neptunian object (TNO) beyond the orbit of Neptune and the Kuiper cliff. As of February 2020, it has the 8th highest perihelia of all known minor planets. Based on a still sufficiently determined perihelion a of 50.2 AU, it is not a member of the scattered disc population, as these objects are thought to have been ejected from the classical Kuiper belt into their current orbits by gravitational interactions with Neptune (semi-major axis of 30.1 AU), and typically have highly eccentric orbits and perihelia of less than 38 AU. 2014 ST_{373}'s orbit, however, has never brought it close enough to Neptune to be gravitational disturbed.

On the other hand, this TNO is not an extreme trans-Neptunian object as these objects generally have higher perihelia and/or higher eccentricities. Instead, it is located in a virtually unpopulated region at a perihelion of 50 AU and an eccentricity of 0.5 (see adjunct images, where the grid crosses at q=50 AU and e=0.5).

The Kozai mechanism is capable of transferring orbital eccentricity to a higher inclination. It can be speculated that this dynamical phenomenon also affected the orbit of 2014 ST_{373}. If this was the case, and the object had once belonged to the extreme detached disc objects – which have eccentricities above 0.8 and semi-major axes of at least 250 AU, for a perihelion of 50 AU – the Kozai effect would have slowly decreased 2014 ST_{373}'s aphelion from over 450 AU to currently 159 AU while increasing its inclination. 2014 ST_{373} seems to belong to the same group as 2004 XR190.

== Physical characteristics ==
=== Diameter and albedo ===
Based on an absolute magnitude of 5.4, and an assumed astronomical albedo of 0.09, which is a standard default value adopted for trans-Neptunian objects by Johnston's Archive, 2014 ST_{373} measures approximately 370 kilometers (230 miles) in diameter. The body's color, rotation period, pole and shape remain unknown.
