= 2014 FE72 =

Extreme trans-Neptunian object from the outer Oort cloud

2014 FE_{72}
- Discovery images of 2014 FE_{72} taken by Cerro Tololo Observatory's Dark Energy Camera on 26 March 2014

Discovery
- Discovered by: S. Sheppard; C. Trujillo
- Discovery site: Cerro Tololo Obs.
- Discovery date: 26 March 2014

Designations
- Minor planet category: (E)SDO; ETNO; TNO; Distant object

Orbital characteristics(barycentric) (Note: These orbital elements are expressed in terms of the Solar System Barycenter (SSB) as the frame of reference. Due to planetary perturbations, the Sun revolves around the SSB at non-negligible distances, so heliocentric-frame orbital elements and distances (such as those given in JPL's Small-Body Database) can vary on short timescales.)
- Epoch 21 January 2022 (JD 2459600.5)
- Uncertainty parameter 3
- Observation arc: 6.98 yr (2,549 days)
- Aphelion: 5547.51 AU
- Perihelion: 36.277 AU
- Semi-major axis: 2791.896 AU
- Eccentricity: 0.9870
- Orbital period (sidereal): 147522.1 yr
- Mean anomaly: 0.125°
- Mean motion: 0° 0^{m} 0.055^{s} / day
- Inclination: 20.599°
- Longitude of ascending node: 336.770°
- Time of perihelion: ≈ 6 October 1965 ±11 days
- Argument of perihelion: 134.425°
- Earth MOID: 35.3259 AU

Physical characteristics
- Mean diameter: 218 km (Note: under the assumption of an albedo of 0.124); 265 km (Note: under the assumption of an albedo of 0.08)
- Geometric albedo: 0.124 (assumed); 0.08 (assumed)
- Apparent magnitude: 24.6
- Absolute magnitude (H): 6.19; 6.3

2014 FE_{72} is a trans-Neptunian object first observed on 26 March 2014, at Cerro Tololo Inter-American Observatory in La Serena, Chile. It was discovered by Scott Sheppard and Chad Trujillo, and was announced on 29 August 2016.

2014 FE_{72} is an extreme scattered disc object, whose orbit extends into the outer Oort cloud. It is one of the most distant objects in the Solar System by its aphelion (farthest point from the Sun), and on average. As a result, little is known about its physical characteristics. The diameter of 2014 FE_{72} is approximately 265 km under the assumption of a typical TNO albedo of 0.08, or 218 km assuming a typical SDO albedo of 0.124. Because of its extreme distance from the Earth, 2014 FE_{72} appears extremely faint with an apparent magnitude of 24.6.

== History ==
=== Discovery ===
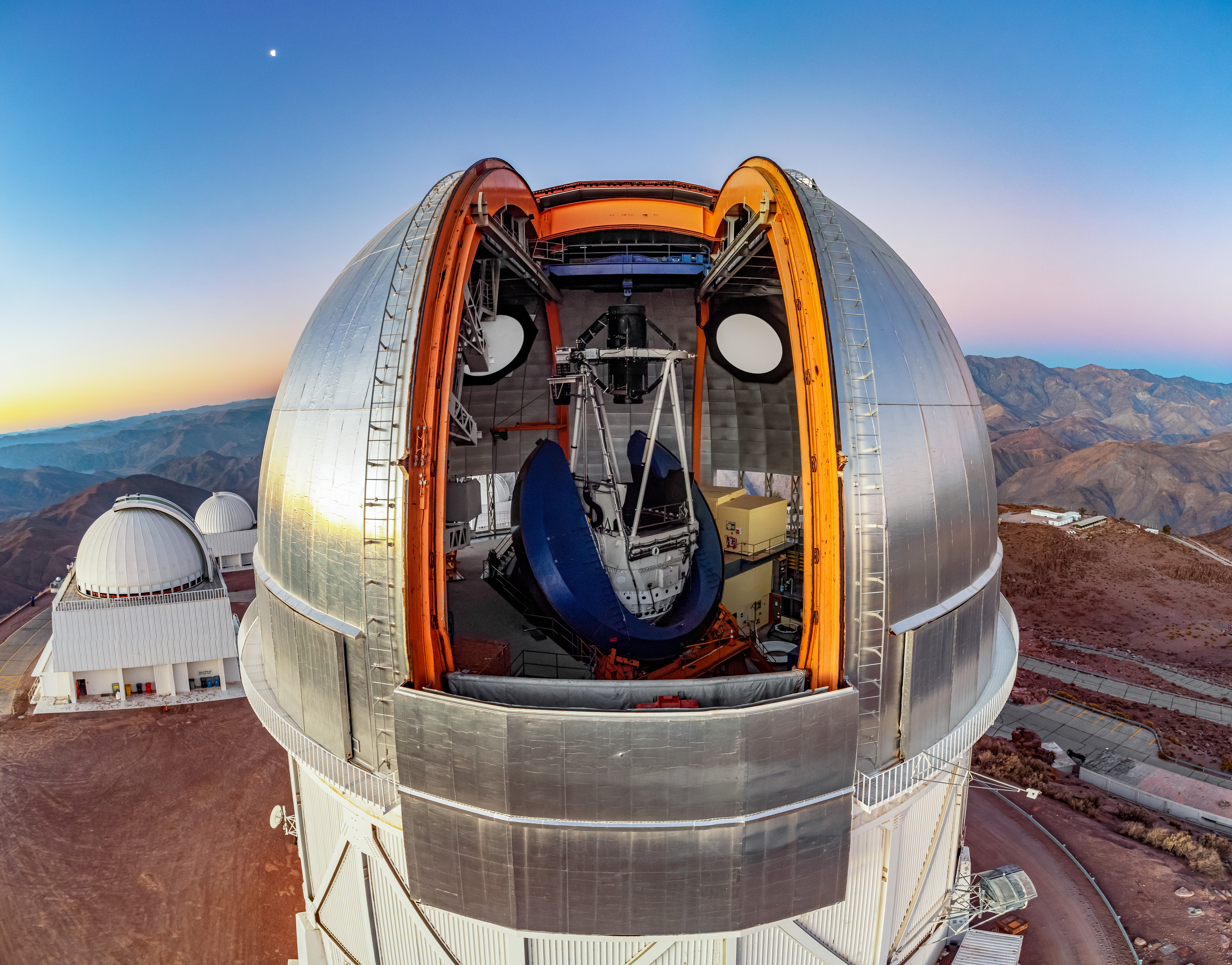
The 4.0-meter Víctor M. Blanco Telescope at Cerro Tololo Observatory, which houses the Dark Energy Camera (DECam).

2014 FE_{72} was first observed on 26 March 2014 at the Cerro Tololo Inter-American Observatory in Chile. The observation was made by astronomers Scott Sheppard and Chad Trujillo using the Dark Energy Camera (DECam) on the 4-meter Víctor M. Blanco Telescope. This discovery was part of a large tracking survey for objects beyond Neptune and the Kuiper belt, conducted to find evidence for the predicted Planet Nine. The Minor Planet Center formally announced the discovery on 29 August 2016. Upon its announcement, the Carnegie Institution for Science identified 2014 FE_{72} as the first distant Oort cloud object found with an orbit entirely beyond Neptune.

=== Further observations ===
Following its first observation, the Minor Planet Center recorded 20 total observations tracking 2014 FE_{72}. These observations spanned a 6.98 years, from 26 March 2014 to 18 March 2021. During 2014 and 2015, the object was tracked using the Magellan-Baade Telescope at Las Campanas Observatory and the Gemini South Telescope on Cerro Pachón. In May 2018, the Lowell Discovery Telescope captured more tracking data, observing 2014 FE_{72} at a faint r-band magnitude of 23.9. The final two observations were recorded on 18 March 2021 using the Dark Energy Camera.

=== Provisional designation ===
The object was formally given the provisional designation 2014 FE_{72} by the Minor Planet Center on 29 August 2016. The provisional designation of it indicates its discovery date, the first letter represents the second half of March and the second letter and numbers means that it is the 1805th object discovered during that half-month. (Note: The second letter 'E' indicates that it is the 5th object discovered on the 19th cycle of discoveries. Each completed cycle consists of 25 letters representing discoveries, hence 5 + (72 completed cycles × 25 letters) = 1805.) The MPC will give a permanent minor planet number to 2014 FE_{72} once its orbit is well determined with multiple years of observations, which would make it eligible for formal naming. As of 2026, it does not have an official name.

== Orbit ==
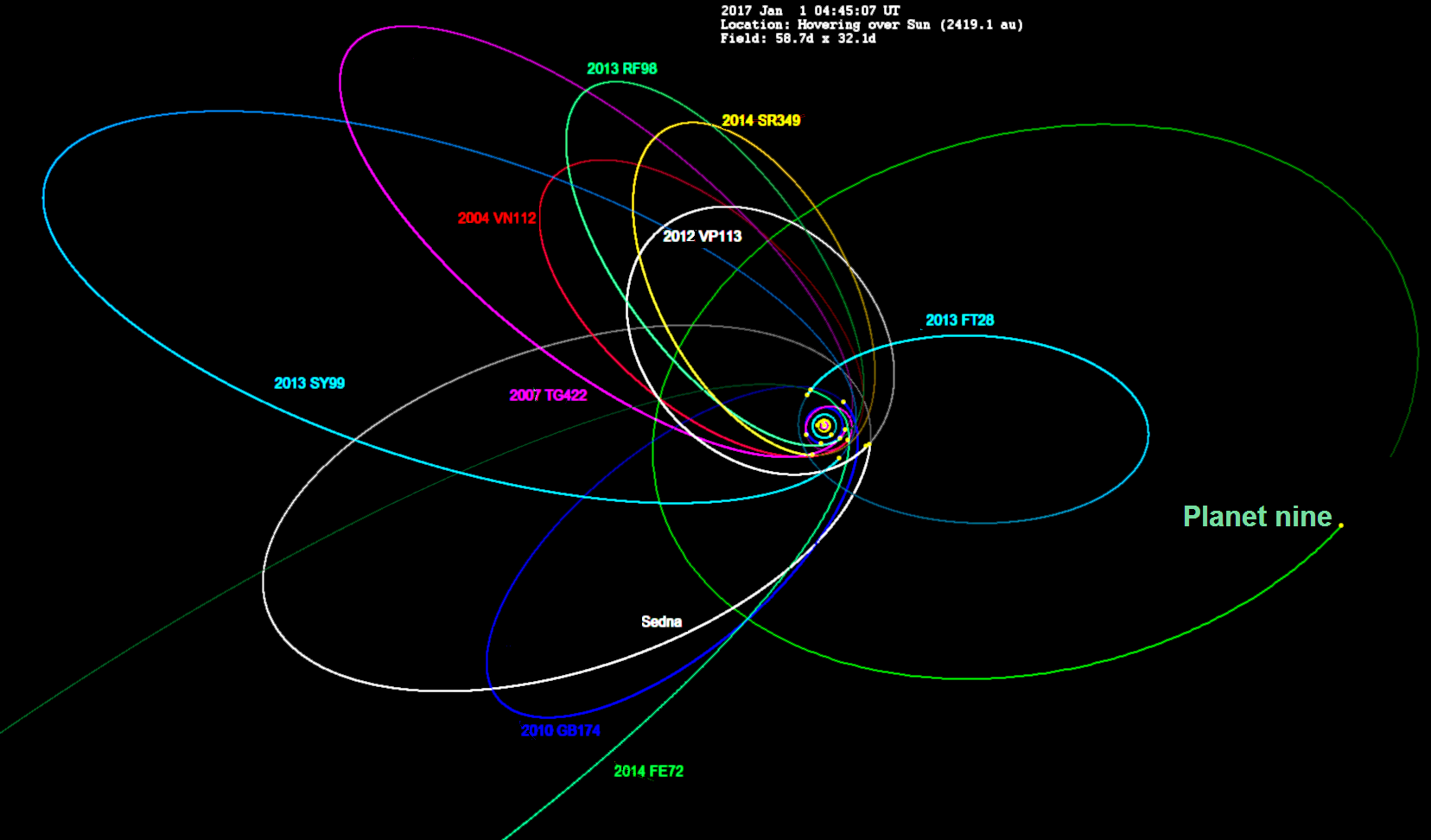
Orbits of 2014 FE_{72} (green, at lower left) and other scattered/detached objects, along with hypothetical Planet Nine on the right

=== Characteristics ===
2014 FE_{72} has an extremely elongated orbit with an eccentricity of 0.99. It has a perihelion of ~36.3 AU, a barycentric aphelion of ~5548 AU with an average orbital distance of 2792 AU, and an orbital period of around 147,500 years. Its orbit has an inclination of approximately 20.6° with respect to the ecliptic. Based on the barycentric orbital period, 2014 FE_{72} takes roughly 5 times longer than Sedna to orbit the Sun. These orbit values are the largest known for any Solar System body that is not a long-period comet. (Note: 2017 MB_{7}, an apparently much smaller object (absolute magnitude ~14) which might be an extinct comet, has a similar barycentric aphelion of ~3400 AU and an orbital period of ~72,000 years.) 2014 FE_{72} last passed through perihelion in late 1965. As of 2026, it is about 68 AU from the Sun.

=== Orbital classification ===
2014 FE_{72} is a member of the extreme scattered disc. It is one of a small number of detached objects with perihelion distances of 30 AU or more, and semi-major axes of 150 AU or more. 2014 FE_{72} is classified as an Outer Oort Cloud object. It is the first discovered object in this population to have a perihelion beyond the orbit of Neptune. Its orbit was likely shaped by past gravitational interactions with Neptune. However, due to its large orbit, its Orbital path is also affected by other forces such as the galactic tide. The longitude of perihelion of 2014 FE_{72} aligns with the orbital positioning that is seen in other extreme trans-Neptunian objects. Its average orbital distance is noted as one of the largest among known trans-Neptunian objects. Unlike detached sednoids, it is classified as a scattered object because its lower perihelion allows Neptune's gravity to change its orbit over time.

=== Orbital stability ===
Simulations show that if other forces push its perihelion below 35 AU, strong gravitational interactions with the outer planets will cause its orbit to become highly unstable. Clustering models group 2014 FE_{72} into a population alongside 541132 Leleakuhonua, 2013 SY99, and 2015 KG163, which might be related to the inner Oort cloud. The unique orbital shape and spacial alignment of 2014 FE_{72} are studied to explain the structure of the outer Solar System. Its orbital clustering is discussed in models studying the influence of a distant massive mini Neptune, known as Planet Nine.

== Physical characteristics ==
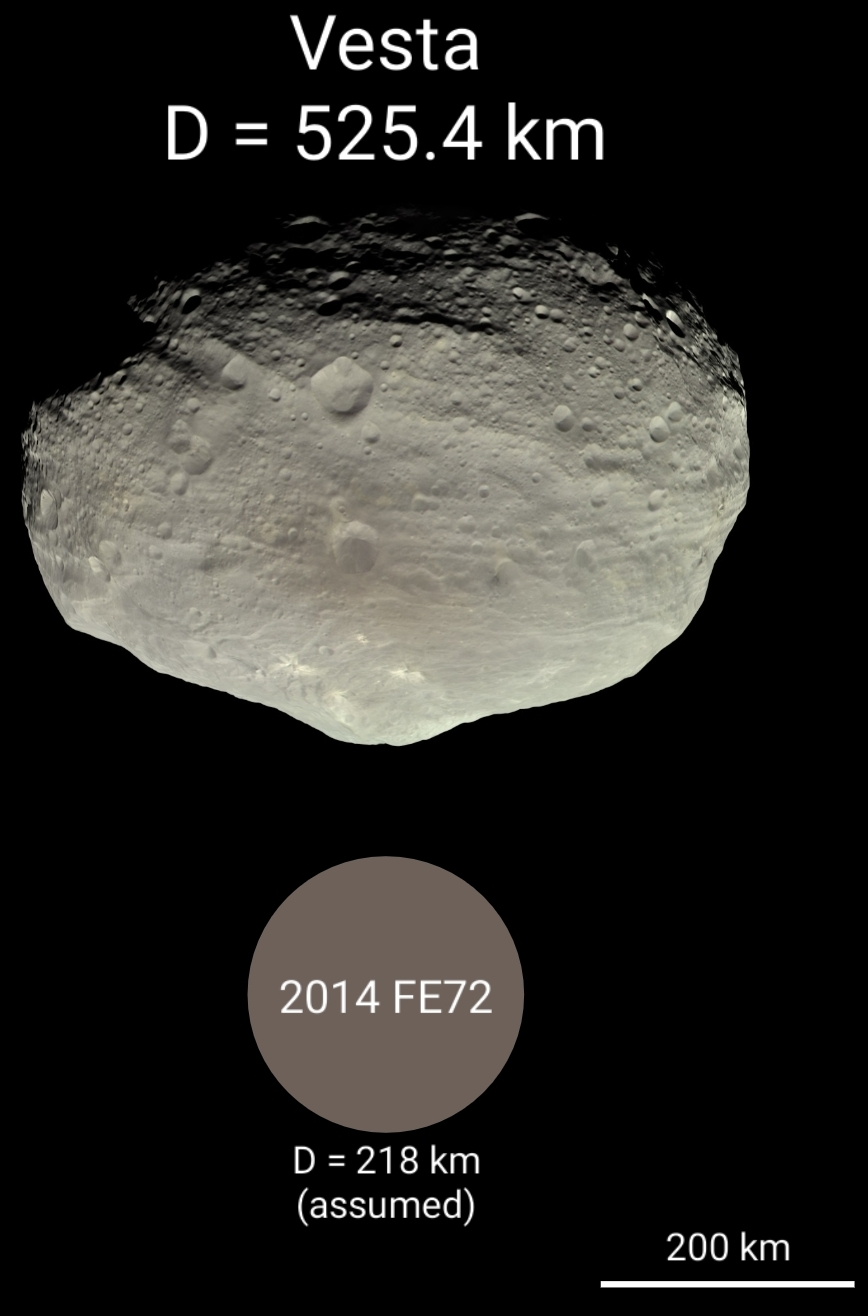
2014 FE_{72} compared to 4 Vesta

Little is known about 2014 FE_{72}'s physical properties. Its diameter has not been directly measured. Michael E. Brown estimated a diameter of 265 km for a typical TNO geometric albedo of 0.08 on his list. (Note: Albedo means reflectivity) Johnston's archive estimated a diameter of 218 km under the assumption of a typical scattered disc object albedo of 0.124. The absolute magnitude of the object is approximately 6.19. Because of its extreme distance from the Earth, 2014 FE_{72} appears extremely faint with an apparent magnitude of 24.6, which is only visible to the largest telescopes in the world. 2014 FE_{72} is not known to have any natural satellites or moons, which means there is currently no way to measure its mass and density.

American astronomer Michael Brown considers 2014 FE_{72} to possibly be a dwarf planet. However, a planetary study by William M. Grundy suggests that trans-Neptunian objects in the 400–1000 km size range form a transition zone between small, low-density bodies and large, dense dwarf planets. Since 2014 FE_{72} has an estimated diameter of only 218–265 km, it falls below this transition zone.

== Origin and future ==
Simulations using Modified Newtonian Dynamics study the origin of 2014 FE_{72} without Planet Nine. In that model, 2014 FE_{72} experiences highly chaotic orbital changes because of the close encounters with the outer planets. Simulations of 2014 FE_{72} show that around 75 million years ago, it was located inside the outer planet region. Many close approaches with the outer planets then scattered the object outward, allowing its orbit to grow to its current extreme orbit around 25 million years ago. Future simulations of its orbital path show that after more planetary encounters and gravitational cycles, its average orbital distance will continue to grow over the next 100 million years. Under this scenario, the external field effect from the galaxy finally helps detach the object from the direct gravitational control of the planets and the Sun.

== Visualizations ==
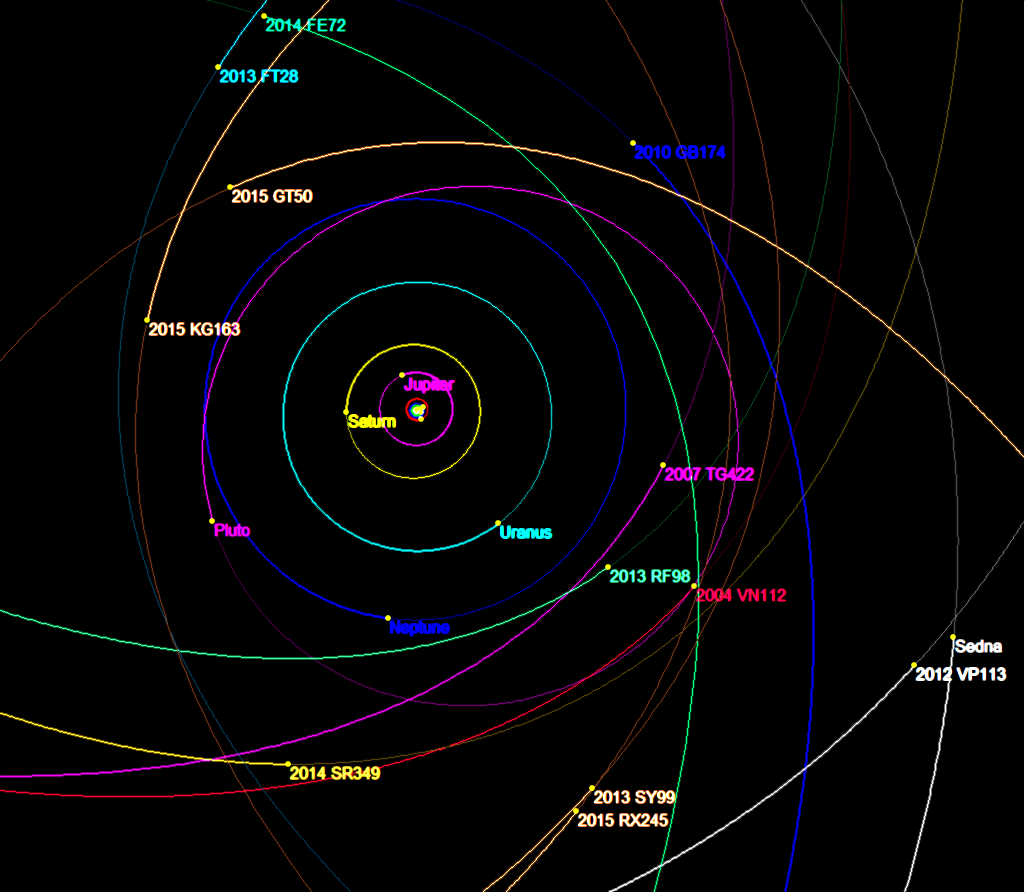
2014 FE_{72} is seen at the top here in green, moving away from the Sun

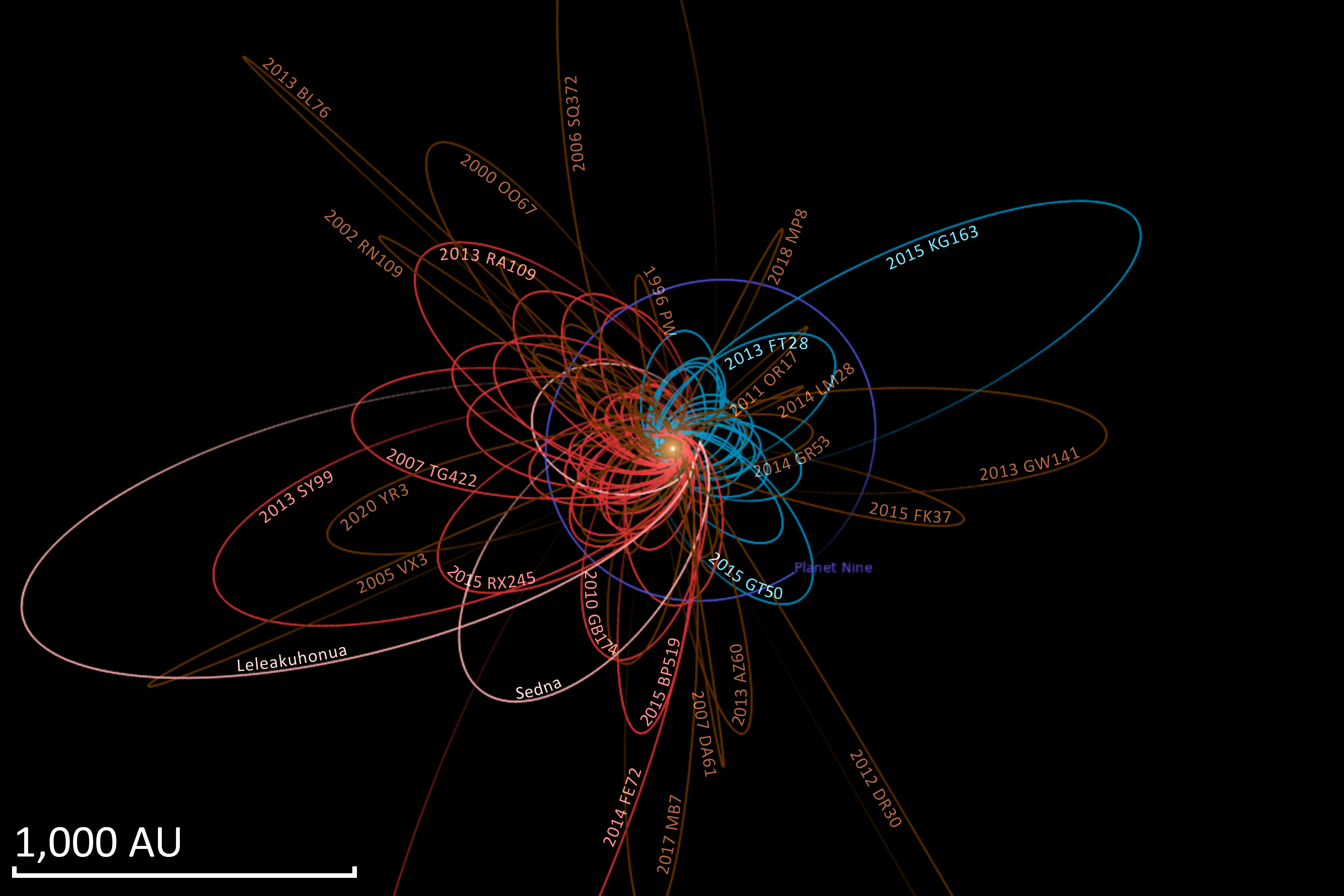
The orbits of Sedna, 2012 VP113, Leleākūhonua, and other very distant objects including 2014 FE_{72} along with the predicted orbit of Planet Nine.

== See also ==
- 541132 Leleākūhonua, (formerly nicknamed as 'The Goblin') an extreme trans-Neptunian object and sednoid with a very large aphelion
- 2012 VP113, (nicknamed as 'Biden') an extreme trans-Neptunian object and sednoid with the farthest perihelion of all known minor planets and all known objects in the Solar System
- Extreme trans-Neptunian objects
- List of Solar System objects by greatest aphelion
- List of unnumbered trans-Neptunian objects
- List of unnumbered minor planets
