= 2021 RR205 =

Extreme trans-Neptunian object

2021 RR_{205}
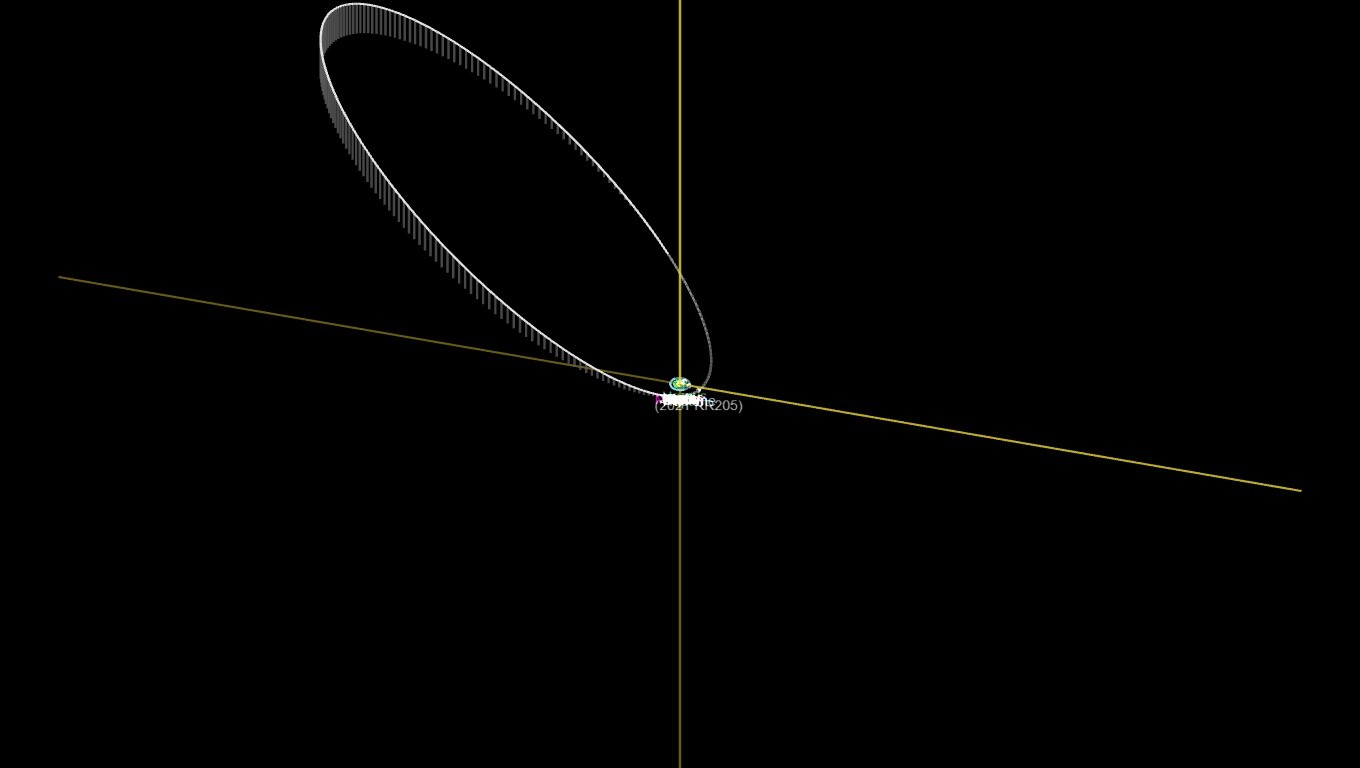
- Orbit diagram of 2021 RR_{205}

Discovery
- Discovered by: S. S. Sheppard; D. J. Tholen; C. Trujillo
- Discovery site: Mauna Kea Obs.
- Discovery date: 5 September 2021

Designations
- Minor planet category: TNO · detached · distant

Orbital characteristics (barycentric)
- Epoch 25 February 2023 (JD 2460000.5)
- Uncertainty parameter 3
- Observation arc: 5.11 yr (1,867 days)
- Earliest precovery date: 24 July 2017
- Aphelion: 1926 AU
- Perihelion: 55.541 AU
- Semi-major axis: 990.9 AU
- Eccentricity: 0.94395
- Orbital period (sidereal): 31173 yr
- Mean anomaly: 0.363°
- Mean motion: 0° 0^{m} 0.114^{s} / day
- Inclination: 7.644°
- Longitude of ascending node: 108.345°
- Argument of perihelion: 208.574°

Physical characteristics
- Mean diameter: 100–300 km (est. 0.04–0.2)
- Apparent magnitude: 24.6
- Absolute magnitude (H): 6.77±0.11 · 6.74

2021 RR_{205} is an extreme trans-Neptunian object discovered by astronomers Scott Sheppard, David Tholen, and Chad Trujillo with the Subaru Telescope at Mauna Kea Observatory on 5 September 2021. It resides beyond the outer extent of the Kuiper belt on a distant and highly eccentric orbit detached from Neptune's gravitational influence, with a large perihelion distance of 55.5 astronomical units (AU). Its large orbital semi-major axis (~1,000 AU) suggests it is potentially from the inner Oort cloud. 2021 RR_{205} and 2013 SY99 both lie in the 50–75 AU perihelion gap that separates the detached objects from the more distant sednoids; dynamical studies indicate that such objects in the inner edge of this gap weakly experience "diffusion", or inward orbital migration due to minuscule perturbations by Neptune. While Sheppard considers 2021 RR_{205} a sednoid, researchers Yukun Huang and Brett Gladman do not.

2021 RR_{205}'s heliocentric distance was 60 AU when it was discovered. It has been detected in precovery observations by the Dark Energy Survey at Cerro Tololo Observatory from as early as July 2017. It last passed perihelion in the early 1990s and is now moving outbound from the Sun.
