= 2023 KQ14 =

Sednoid

2023 KQ_{14}
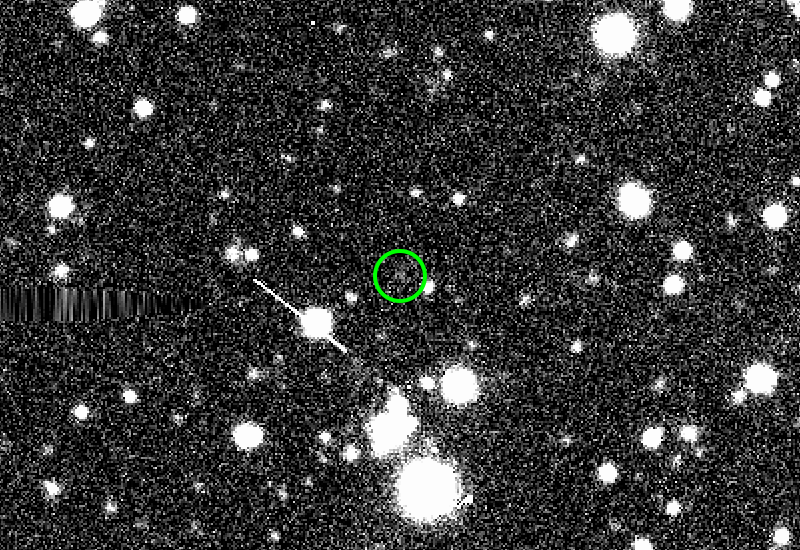
- 2023 KQ_{14} imaged by the Dark Energy Camera on 7 June 2021

Discovery
- Discovered by: FOSSIL (Note: FOSSIL is the acronym for "Formation of the Outer Solar System: an Icy Legacy", an astronomical survey directed by an international collaboration of astronomers primarily from Japan and Taiwan. The FOSSIL survey uses the 8.2-meter Subaru Telescope at Mauna Kea Observatory to search for trans-Neptunian objects in the sky.)
- Discovery site: Mauna Kea Obs.
- Discovery date: 16 May 2023

Designations
- Alternative designations: "Ammonite" (nickname)
- Minor planet category: ETNO · sednoid

Orbital characteristics (barycentric)
- Epoch 5 May 2025 (JD 2460800.5)
- Uncertainty parameter 3
- Observation arc: 19.23 yr (7,024 days)
- Earliest precovery date: 11 April 2005
- Aphelion: 438.1 AU
- Perihelion: 65.9 AU
- Semi-major axis: 251.9±0.3 AU
- Eccentricity: 0.7383±0.0003
- Orbital period (sidereal): 3,998 yr
- Mean anomaly: 356.56°
- Mean motion: 0° 0^{m} 0.888^{s} / day
- Inclination: 10.98°
- Longitude of ascending node: 72.104°±0.001°
- Time of perihelion: ≈ February 2063
- Argument of perihelion: 198.74°

Physical characteristics
- Mean diameter: 220–380 km (calc. for albedo 0.05–0.15)
- Spectral type: moderately red; g–r = 0.87±0.18; r–i = 0.36±0.18
- Apparent magnitude: 25.4
- Absolute magnitude (H): 6.77±0.43

2023 KQ_{14}, informally nicknamed Ammonite, is a trans-Neptunian object (TNO) orbiting the Sun on an extremely wide elliptical orbit. It was discovered by the Subaru Telescope atop Mauna Kea on 16 May 2023, as part of the internationally led astronomical survey "Formation of the Outer Solar System: an Icy Legacy" (FOSSIL). 2023 KQ_{14} is unusual because the direction of its orbital apsides is not aligned with those of previously known TNOs with high-perihelion elliptical orbits (sometimes known as sednoids), which challenges the hypothesis that an unseen distant planet ("Planet Nine") could be aligning their orbits. 2023 KQ_{14} likely has a diameter between 220 and 380 km (140 and 240 mi).

== Discovery ==
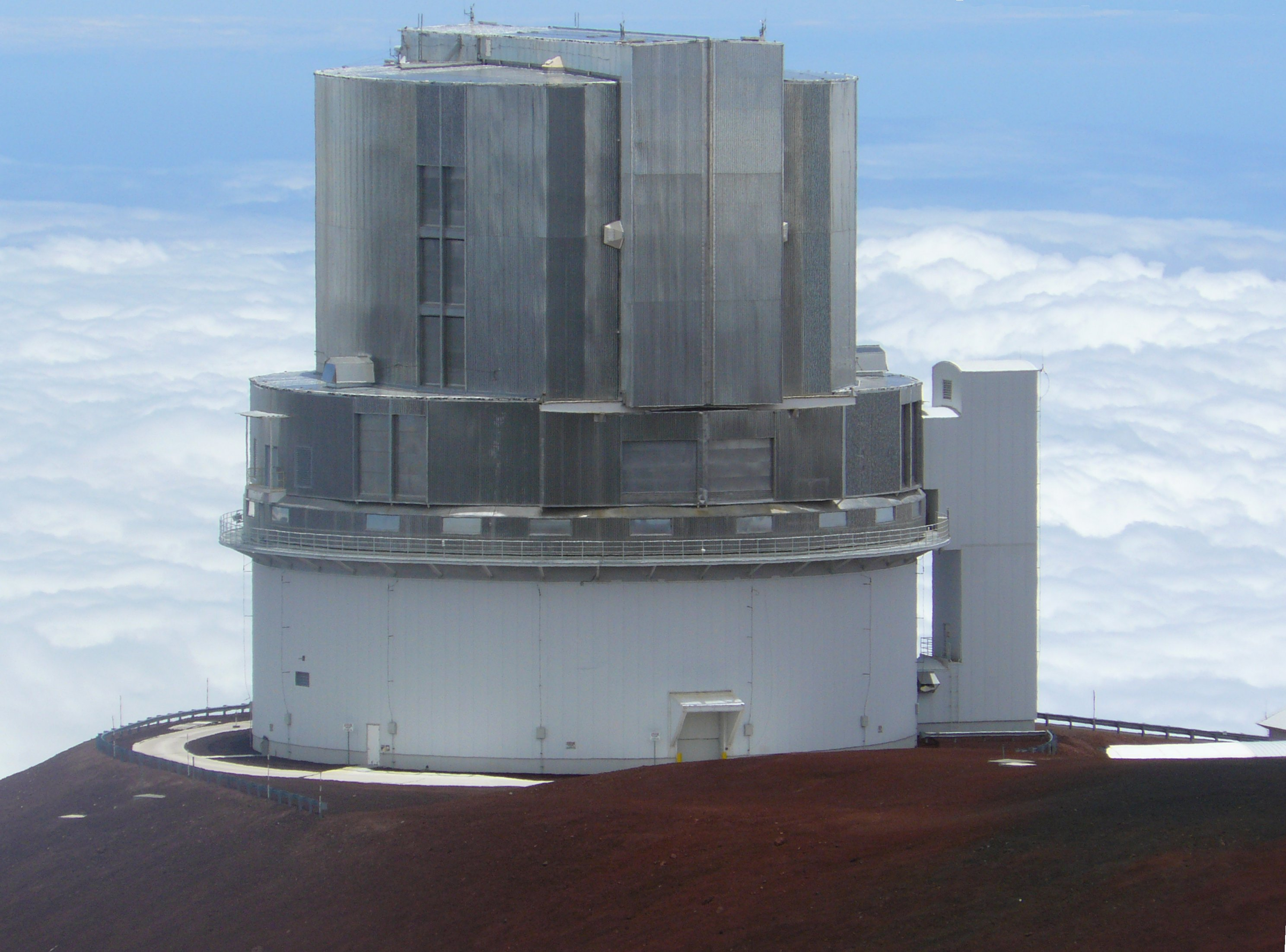
The Subaru Telescope atop Mauna Kea, which discovered 2023 KQ_{14} in 2023

2023 KQ_{14} was discovered by the 8.2-meter Subaru Telescope at Mauna Kea Observatory, Hawaii, on 16 May 2023, during the operation of the "Formation of the Outer Solar System: an Icy Legacy" (FOSSIL) astronomical survey. The FOSSIL survey, which is an international collaboration of astronomers primarily from Japan and Taiwan, began in 2020 with the initial goal of detecting faint Jupiter trojans and trans-Neptunian objects (TNOs) across the sky. The survey discovered 2023 KQ_{14} during the first year of its second phase ("FOSSIL II"), when it began focusing on detecting TNOs only.

Astronomers of the FOSSIL survey identified 2023 KQ_{14} in FOSSIL observations from March to August 2023 and noticed that it was extraordinarily far from the Sun. To better determine 2023 KQ_{14}'s orbit and distance, astronomers Ying-Tung Chen and John J. Kavelaars reobserved the object with the Canada–France–Hawaii Telescope in July 2024. These extra observations allowed Chen to precover 2023 KQ_{14} in archival Dark Energy Camera images from June 2021 and May 2014. The discovery of the object was announced by the Minor Planet Center (MPC) on 14 April 2025, and a research paper detailing the discovery was published in Nature Astronomy on 14 July 2025.

== Name ==
The object has the minor planet provisional designation 2023 KQ_{14}, which was given by the MPC in the discovery announcement. The provisional designation indicates the year and half-month of its discovery date. The object was unofficially nicknamed "Ammonite" by the FOSSIL team, after the ammonite fossil which serves as an analogy to the object's fossilized orbit since the beginning of the Solar System. An official name can be given once 2023 KQ_{14} receives a permanent minor planet catalog number from the MPC.

== Orbit ==
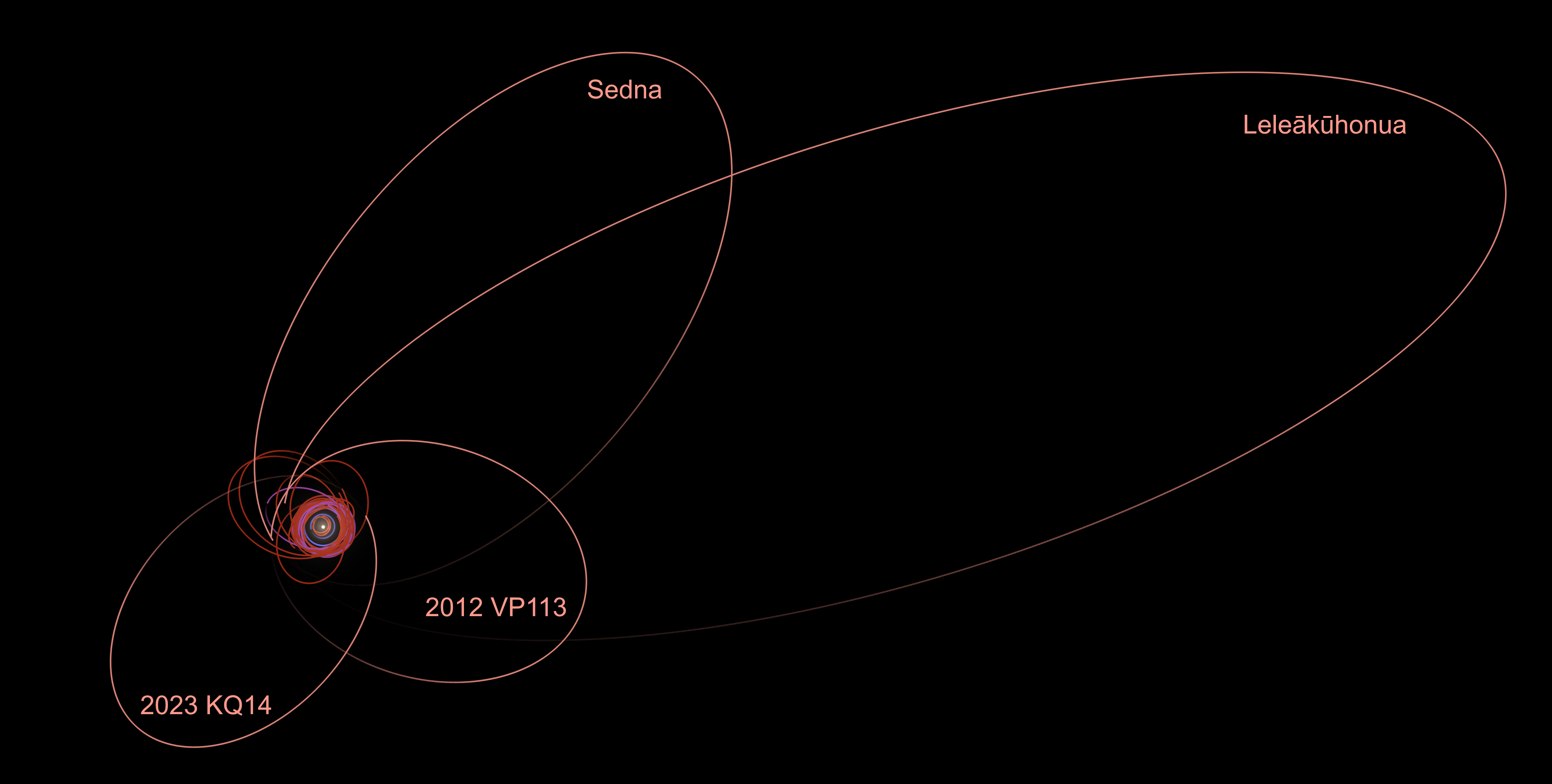
Diagram showing the orbits of the four known sednoids (colored pink), with their names labeled. The orbit of 2023 KQ_{14} points to the bottom left, opposite of the other sednoids. The Kuiper belt (colored red) is shown for scale.

2023 KQ_{14} follows an extremely wide elliptical orbit around the Sun, whose distance with respect to the Solar System barycenter (Note: Orbital elements of TNOs use the Solar System Barycenter (SSB) as the frame of reference. Due to planetary perturbations, the Sun revolves around the SSB at non-negligible distances, so heliocentric-frame orbital elements and distances can vary in short timescales as shown in JPL-Horizons.) ranges from 65.9 astronomical units (AU) at perihelion to 438 AU at aphelion. It takes roughly 4,000 years for 2023 KQ_{14} to complete one orbit. 2023 KQ_{14}'s barycentric orbit has a semi-major axis of 252 AU, eccentricity of 0.739, and an inclination of 11° with respect to the ecliptic. 2023 KQ_{14} was 71.0 AU away from the Sun when it was discovered, and it will pass perihelion in February 2063.

2023 KQ_{14} is one of the four known distant TNOs (as of 2025) whose perihelion distances are greater than q = 60 AU and whose semi-major axes are greater than a = 200 AU. These TNOs are sometimes known as sednoids. 2023 KQ_{14} has the third farthest perihelion among the known TNOs, following 2012 VP113 (q = 80.6 AU) and Sedna (q = 76.3 AU). 2023 KQ_{14} is far enough away from Neptune (a = 30 AU) that its orbit is barely affected by the planet's gravity. Because 2023 KQ_{14} is detached from the gravitational influence of the known planets, its orbit is dynamically stable for billions of years and had likely remained unchanged since the beginning of the Solar System 4.5 billion years ago. This suggests that external gravitational influences must be responsible for forming the orbits of 2023 KQ_{14} and the sednoids—possible sources include a passing star, a rogue planet formed in the Solar System, a distant unseen planet ("Planet Nine"), migration of the Sun through different parts of the Milky Way, or other stars in the Sun's birth cluster.

=== Orbital alignment ===
The direction of 2023 KQ_{14}'s orbital apsides, or longitude of perihelion (ϖ), is not aligned with those of the three previously known sednoids. Whereas the orbits of the three previously known sednoids appear to cluster between ϖ = 0° and ϖ = 90°, the orbit of 2023 KQ_{14} points in the opposite direction at ϖ = 271°. (Note: The longitude of perihelion ϖ is defined as the sum of the longitude of ascending node Ω (measured on ecliptic plane) and the argument of periapsis ω (measured on orbital plane): $\varpi = \Omega + \omega.$) The anti-aligned orbit of 2023 KQ_{14} challenges but does not rule out the Planet Nine hypothesis, which was originally proposed to explain the apparent orbital clustering of the three previously known sednoids. If Planet Nine exists, then it should orbit the Sun at a farther distance (using the 2024 prediction of a = 500+170
−120 AU) in order to keep the orbit of 2023 KQ_{14} stable for at least one billion years.

Simulations without Planet Nine by Ying-Tung Chen and collaborators in 2025 suggested that there is a 97% chance that 2023 KQ_{14}'s orbit was previously aligned with the three known sednoids 4.2 billion years ago, or roughly 300 million years after the formation of the Solar System, if the orbits of all sednoids were apsidally precessing due to perturbations by the giant planets. This primordial cluster of aligned orbits would have then gradually dispersed due to the sednoids' differing apsidal precession rates. In this case, this would suggest that the sednoids' orbits were perturbed by a rogue planet early in the Solar System's history.

== Physical characteristics ==
2023 KQ_{14} appears extremely faint from Earth, with an apparent magnitude of 25.4. Its brightness suggests a diameter between 220 and 380 km (140 and 240 mi), if it has a geometric albedo between 0.05 and 0.15. Observations by the Magellan Telescopes in April 2025 showed no significant brightness variations over time, suggesting that 2023 KQ_{14} has either a slow rotation or a uniform shape or albedo. Observations of 2023 KQ_{14} in different light filters show that it has a moderately red color similar to other TNOs and sednoids.

== See also ==
- Detached object – a class of high-perihelion TNOs that are gravitationally detached from Neptune's gravitational influence
- Sedna – the first sednoid discovered
- 2012 VP113 – the second sednoid discovered
- 541132 Leleākūhonua – the third sednoid discovered
- 2017 OF201 – dwarf planet candidate with an extremely wide and eccentric orbit that is not clustered with other extreme TNOs
