= 2015 KQ174 =

Trans-Neptunian object

2015 KQ_{174}
Discovery
- Discovered by: Mauna Kea Obs.
- Discovery site: Mauna Kea Obs. (first observed only)
- Discovery date: 24 May 2015

Designations
- Minor planet category: TNO; detached; SDO; distant

Orbital characteristics
- Epoch 27 April 2019 (JD 2458600.5)
- Uncertainty parameter 4
- Observation arc: 3.24 yr (1,183 d)
- Aphelion: 61.483 AU
- Perihelion: 49.311 AU
- Semi-major axis: 55.397 AU
- Eccentricity: 0.1099
- Orbital period (sidereal): 412.32 yr (150,600 d)
- Mean anomaly: 76.743°
- Mean motion: 0° 0^{m} 8.64^{s} / day
- Inclination: 24.344°
- Longitude of ascending node: 213.92°
- Argument of perihelion: 294.05°

Physical characteristics
- Mean diameter: 154 km
- Geometric albedo: 0.09 (assumed)
- Apparent magnitude: 25.01
- Absolute magnitude (H): 7.3

2015 KQ_{174} is a trans-Neptunian object, considered both a scattered and detached object, located in the outermost region of the Solar System. The object with a moderately inclined and eccentric orbit measures approximately 154 kilometers (96 miles) in diameter. It was first observed on 24 May 2015, by astronomers at the Mauna Kea Observatories in Hawaii, United States.

== Orbit and classification ==
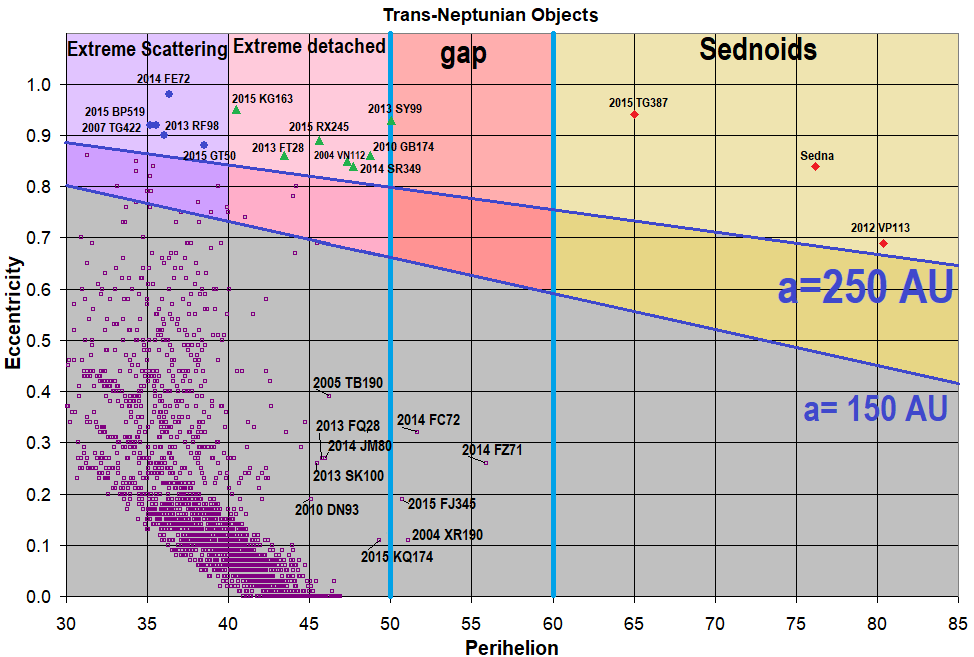
2015 KQ_{174} is located near the "gap", a poorly understood region.

2015 KQ_{174} orbits the Sun at a distance of 49.3–61.5 AU once every 412 years and 4 months (150,600 days; semi-major axis of 55.4 AU). Its orbit has an eccentricity of 0.11 and an inclination of 24° with respect to the ecliptic.

The object belongs to the same group as 2004 XR190 ("Buffy"), 2014 FC72, 2014 FZ71 and 2015 FJ345 (also see diagram). With an orbital period of 412 years, it seems to be a resonant trans-Neptunian objects in a 2:5 resonance with Neptune, as several other objects, but with a lower eccentricity (0.11 instead of more than 0.60) and higher perihelia (at 49.3 AU rather than 31–41 AU).

Considered both a scattered and detached object, 2015 KQ_{174} is particularly unusual as it has an unusually circular orbit for a scattered-disc object (SDO). Although it is thought that traditional scattered-disc objects have been ejected into their current orbits by gravitational interactions with Neptune, the low eccentricity of its orbit and the distance of its perihelion (SDOs generally have highly eccentric orbits and perihelia less than 38 AU) seems hard to reconcile with such celestial mechanics. This has led to some uncertainty as to the current theoretical understanding of the outer Solar System. The theories include close stellar passages, unseen planet/rogue planets/planetary embryos in the early Kuiper belt, and resonance interaction with an outward-migrating Neptune. The Kozai mechanism is capable of transferring orbital eccentricity to a higher inclination. It is in a 5:2 resonance to Neptune. It seems to belong to the same group as 2004 XR190, nicknamed "Buffy".

== Physical characteristics ==
Johnston's Archive estimates a diameter of 154 kilometers based on an assumed albedo of 0.09. This is approximately a quarter the size of "Buffy" which is estimated at around 500 kilometres (310 mi), roughly a quarter the size of Pluto.
