= (612911) 2004 XR190 =

Minor planet in the scattered disc

(612911) 2004 XR_{190}
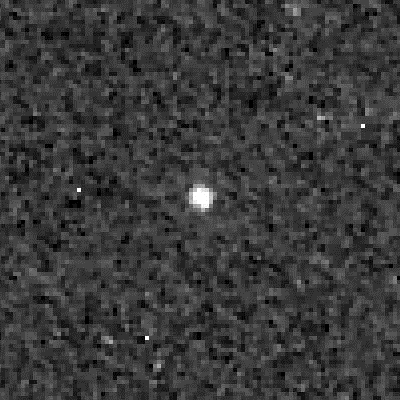
- Hubble Space Telescope image of 2004 XR_{190}, taken in October 2010

Discovery
- Discovered by: CFEPS
- Discovery site: Maunakea Obs.
- Discovery date: 11 December 2004

Designations
- Alternative designations: "Buffy" (nickname)
- Minor planet category: TNO; detached; SDO; distant

Orbital characteristics(barycentric) (Note: These orbital elements are expressed in terms of the Solar System Barycenter (SSB) as the frame of reference. Due to planetary perturbations, the Sun revolves around the SSB at non-negligible distances, so heliocentric-frame orbital elements and distances (such as those given in JPL's Small-Body Database) can vary on short timescales.)
- Epoch 2025 Ṃay 05 (JD 2460800.5)
- Uncertainty parameter 2
- Observation arc: 20.00 yr (8,036 d)
- Earliest precovery date: 6 December 2002
- Aphelion: 63.794 AU
- Perihelion: 51.134 AU
- Semi-major axis: 57.464 AU
- Eccentricity: 0.1102
- Orbital period (sidereal): 435.6 yr (160,600 d)
- Mean anomaly: 277.234°
- Mean motion: 0° 0^{m} 8.064^{s} / day
- Inclination: 46.7276°
- Longitude of ascending node: 252.387°
- Time of perihelion: 6 April 2117 ±15 days
- Argument of perihelion: 283.849°
- Known satellites: 0
- Neptune MOID: 25.4 AU (3.80 billion km)

Physical characteristics
- Mean diameter: 600±170 km (occultation); ≥560 km (occultation); 502 km? (est.); 335–530 km (est.); 425–850 km (est.); 350–784 km (est.) (Note: Using AstDyS magnitude, Bruton formula, and commonly assumed minor planet albedo range of 0.05 to 0.25 (as detailed by Bruton))
- Synodic rotation period: 19.47 h (single-peaked); 10.57 h (double-peaked); 7.26 h (third-peaked)
- Geometric albedo: 0.095±0.23 (R-band, occultation); 0.04–0.16 (assumed); 0.130 (assumed); 0.10–0.25 (assumed)
- Apparent magnitude: 21.8±0.2 (r-band); 21.9+0.8 −1.5 (G-band); 21.85±0.35 (wide-band); 21.8+0.7 −0.4 (several other bands)
- Absolute magnitude (H): 3.802±0.022 (R-band, 2022); 3.937±0.036 (R-band, 2012); 4.33; 4.32; 4.4; 4.47 (Note: Reverse derived using Allen diameter and albedo data, and Bruton formula); 4.50 (Note: Reverse derived using Schaller diameter and albedo data, and Bruton formula)

(612911) 2004 XR_{190}, internally nicknamed Buffy by the discovery team, is a trans-Neptunian object, classified as both a scattered disc object and a detached object, located in the outermost region of the Solar System. It was first observed on 11 December 2004, by astronomers with the Canada–France Ecliptic Plane Survey at the Mauna Kea Observatories, Hawaii, United States.

2004 XR_{190} is one of the largest known highly inclined (> 45°) objects. With a perihelion of 51 AU, it belongs to a small and poorly understood group of very distant objects with moderate eccentricities.

== Observation history ==
=== Discovery ===
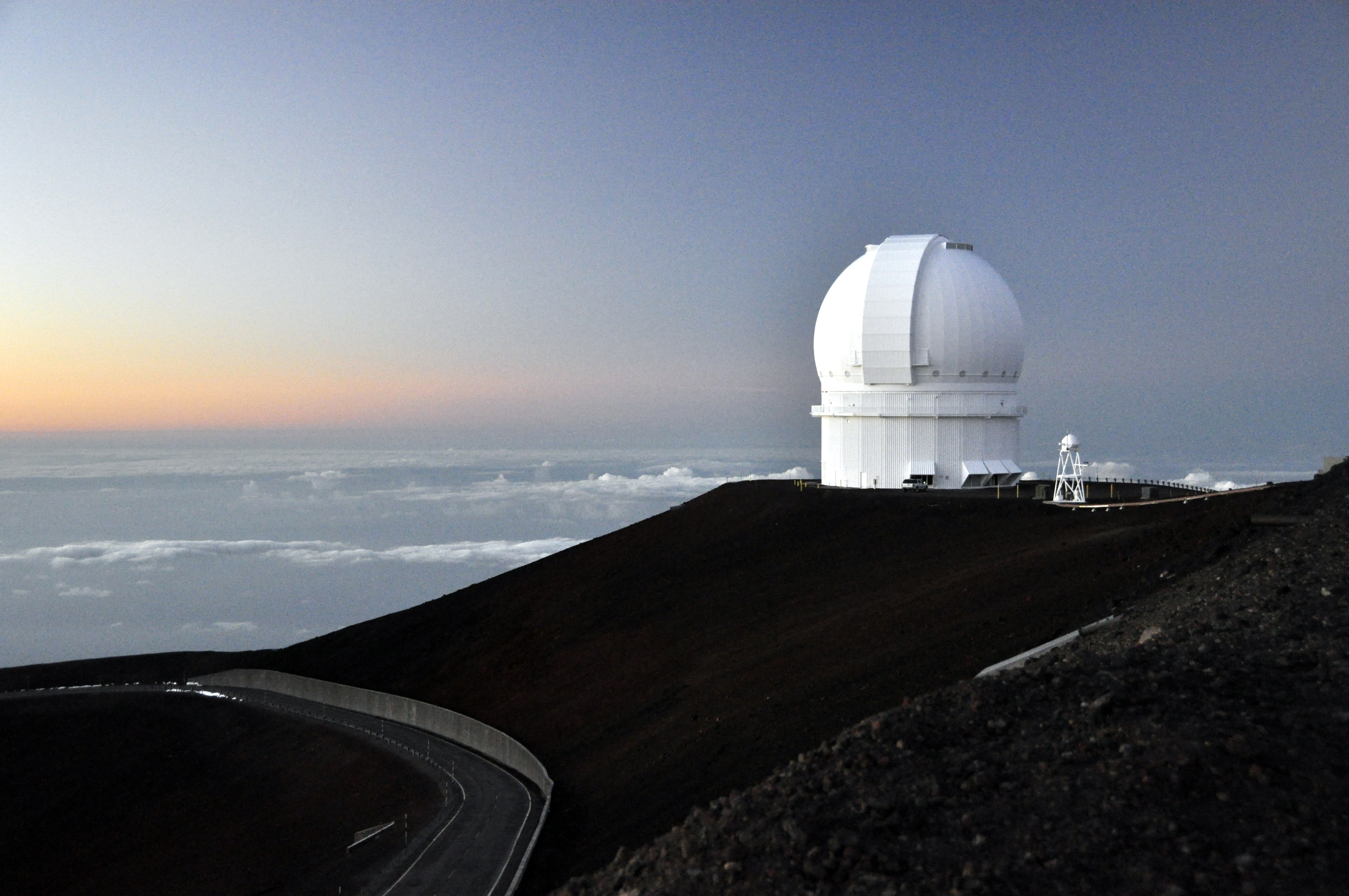
The Canada–France–Hawaii Telescope, the telescope that discovered 2004 XR_{190} on 11 December 2004.

2004 XR_{190} was discovered on 11 December 2004. It was discovered by astronomers led by (Rhiannon) Lynne Allen of the University of British Columbia as part of the Canada–France Ecliptic Plane Survey (CFEPS) using the Canada–France–Hawaii Telescope (CFHT) near the ecliptic. The team included Brett Gladman, John Kavelaars, Jean-Marc Petit, Joel Parker and Phil Nicholson. In 2015, six precovery images from 2002 and 2003 were found in Sloan Digital Sky Survey data.

=== Occultations ===
On 22 January 2021, an occultation by 2004 XR_{190} occurred.

== Provisional designation, numbering and nickname ==
The object was informally nicknamed "Buffy" by the discovery team, after the fictional vampire slayer Buffy Summers, and the team proposed several Inuit-based official names to the International Astronomical Union in 2005. The provisional designation of 2004 XR_{190} indicates its discovery date, the first letter represents the first half of December and the second letter and the numbers after it mean that it is the 4793rd object discovered during that half-month. (Note: The second letter 'R' indicates that it is the 18th object discovered on the 191st cycle of discoveries. Each completed cycle consists of 25 letters representing discoveries, hence 18 + (191 completed cycles × 25 letters) = 4793.)

== Orbit and classification ==
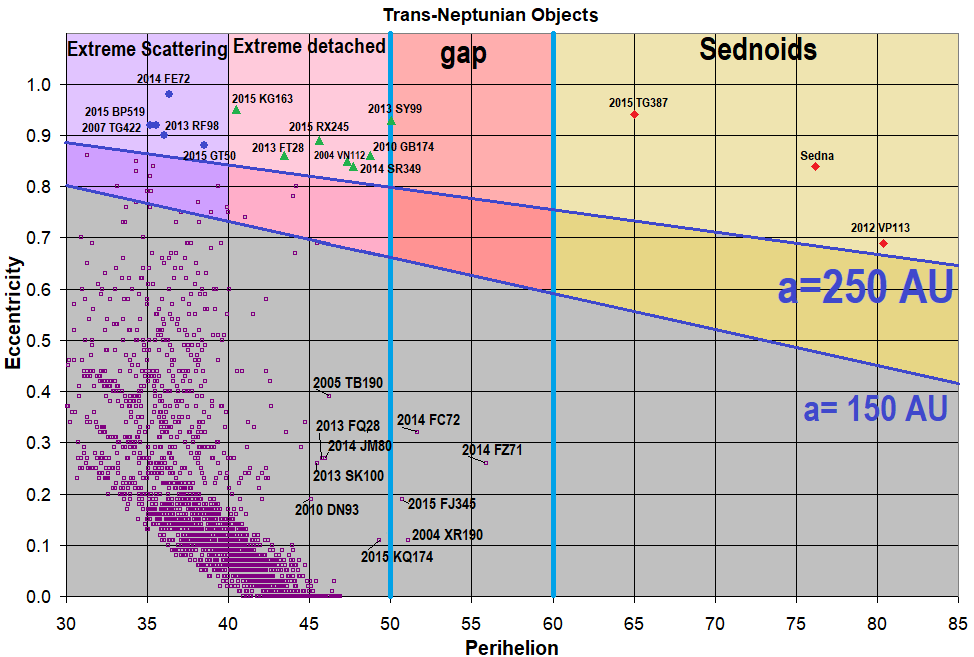
2004 XR_{190} is located in the "gap", a poorly understood region.

2004 XR_{190} orbits the Sun at a distance of 51.1–63.8 AU once every 435 years and 7 months (159,111 days; semi-major axis of 57.46 AU). Its orbit has a moderate eccentricity of 0.11 and a high inclination of 47° with respect to the ecliptic. It came to aphelion in 1901 and will come to perihelion in 2117.

It belongs to the same group as (690420) 2014 FC72, 2014 FZ71, 2015 FJ345 and 2015 KQ174 (also see diagram), that are poorly understood for their large perihelia combined with moderate eccentricities. Considered a scattered and detached object, 2004 XR_{190} is particularly unusual as it has an unusually circular orbit for a scattered-disc object (SDO). Although it is thought that traditional scattered-disc objects have been ejected into their current orbits by gravitational interactions with Neptune, the low eccentricity of its orbit and the distance of its perihelion (SDOs generally have highly eccentric orbits and perihelia less than 38 AU) seems hard to reconcile with such celestial mechanics. This has led to some uncertainty as to the current theoretical understanding of the outer Solar System. The theories include close stellar passages, unseen planet/rogue planets/planetary embryos in the early Kuiper belt, and resonance interaction with an outward-migrating Neptune. The Kozai mechanism is capable of transferring orbital eccentricity to a higher inclination.

A conference abstract by Jones and others in 2006 shows that 2004 XR_{190} is not in a 8:3 mean motion resonance with Neptune.

The object is one of the largest objects with an inclination larger than 45°, traveling further "up and down" than "left to right" around the Sun when viewed edge-on along the ecliptic.

== Physical characteristics ==
=== Diameter and shape ===
Older estimates used assumed albedos between 0.04 and 0.25, and absolute magnitudes from 4.3 to 4.6, 2004 XR_{190} had an estimated diameter of 335 to 850 kilometers; the mean arrived at by considering the two single-figure estimates plus the centre points of the three ranges is 562 km, approximately a quarter the diameter of Pluto. Johnston's archive estimates a diameter of 502 kilometers. However, a thesis by Flavia Luane Rommel, shows a stellar occultation observed by Westport Green Gao Westport in the USA and another one in Sant Esteve Sesrovires in Catalonia, Spain, which shows that it has longest dimension of 716 ± 132 kilometres (445 ± 82 mi), and an equivalent diameter of 600 ± 170 kilometres (370 ± 110 mi), with an oblateness of 0.32±0.14. Another website named "euraster.ericfrappa.com" yielded a diameter of at least 560 kilometres (350 mi) of the same occultation.

In the same thesis, she says that its H_{R} and light curve amplitude makes it likely to be in hydrostatic equilibrium. However, a planetary study by William M. Grundy and others suggests that trans-Neptunian objects in the 400–1000 km size range form a transition zone between small, low-density bodies and large, dense dwarf planets. Since 2004 XR_{190} has an diameter of 600±170 km or 560 km, it falls in this transition zone.

=== Surface and spectra ===
A study by Hainaut et al. shows that 2004 XR_{190} has color indices of: B-V of 0.790; V-R of 0.450; R-I of 0.520; and V-I of 0.970. with V-J, J-H and H-K having no known value. Another study by Peixinho et al. shows that 2004 XR_{190} has B-R of 1.240±0.040. An older study shows that it has color indices of: B-R of 1.24±0.04; V-R of 0.45±0.04; R-I of 0.52±0.04; and B-I of 1.76±0.04. Johnston's archive uses also a B-R of 1.24, and shows it is a BR object. A conference abstract by Jones and others in 2006 shows that it has color indices of: g'-r' of 0.55±0.04 and r'-i' 0.30±0.04, making it in the "neutral or gray range of TNOs". 2004 XR_{190} has no known surface voaltiles. Johnston's archive also assumes an albedo of 0.130. A thesis by Flavia Luane Rommel, derives an albedo of 0.095±0.23, using the occultation model in the same thesis.

=== Rotation ===
A thesis by Flavia Luane Rommel, shows that there are many possibilities of the rotation period of 2004 XR_{190}, with 19.47 hours (0.811 d) being the most likely rotation period, with only one peak. But there is also 10.57 hours (0.440 d) for the second peak, and 7.26 hours (0.303 d) for the third peak, although there still needs to be more observations to get an accurate value.

In the same thesis, they detect a lightcurve amplitude of 0.16 to 0.20 magnitudes, where 0.20 magnitudes is from the 19.47 hour rotation period, 0.17 for the 10.57 hour rotation period, and 0.16 for the 7.26 rotation period.

== Gallery ==
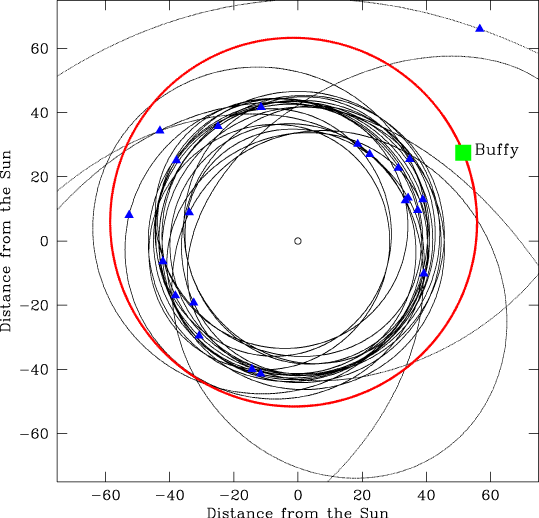
Orbital diagram of 2004 XR_{190} (Earth's orbit in the center is for scale)

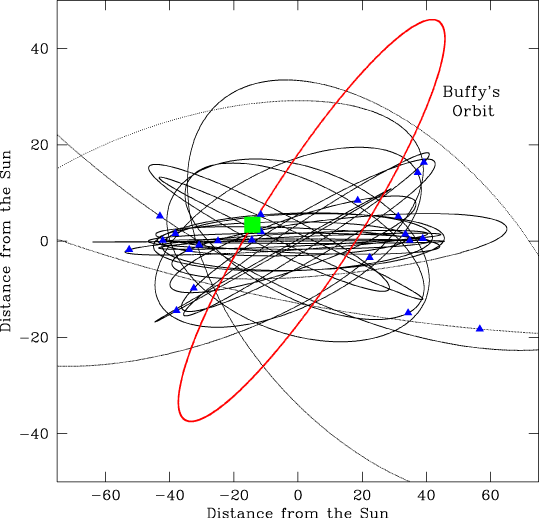
Side view of 2004 XR_{190}'s orbit, showing its high inclination
