= 2014 FZ71 =

Trans-Neptunian object

2014 FZ_{71}
Discovery
- Discovered by: CTIO
- Discovery site: CTIO (first observed only)
- Discovery date: 24 March 2014

Designations
- Minor planet category: TNO; detached; SDO; distant

Orbital characteristics
- Epoch 27 April 2019 (JD 2458600.5)
- Uncertainty parameter 6
- Observation arc: 1.96 yr (716 d)
- Aphelion: 95.791 AU
- Perihelion: 55.849 AU
- Semi-major axis: 75.820 AU
- Eccentricity: 0.2634
- Orbital period (sidereal): 660.21 yr (241,142 d)
- Mean anomaly: 349.80°
- Mean motion: 0° 0^{m} 5.4^{s} / day
- Inclination: 25.506°
- Longitude of ascending node: 306.01°
- Argument of perihelion: 244.94°
- Neptune MOID: 29.3 AU (4.38 billion km)

Physical characteristics
- Mean diameter: 125±25 km; 182 km; 185 km
- Geometric albedo: 0.08 (assumed); 0.09 (assumed)
- Apparent magnitude: 24.61
- Absolute magnitude (H): 6.9

2014 FZ_{71} is a trans-Neptunian object, classified as a scattered and detached object, located in the outermost region of the Solar System. It was first observed on 24 March 2014, by a team led by American astronomer Scott Sheppard at the Cerro Tololo Inter-American Observatory in Chile. With its perihelion of almost 56 AU, it belongs to a small and poorly understood group of very distant objects with moderate eccentricities. The object is not a dwarf planet candidate as it only measures approximately 150 kilometers (93 miles) in diameter.

== Discovery ==
2014 FZ_{71} was first observed on 24 March 2014 by a team of astronomers led by Scott Sheppard of the Carnegie Institution for Science as part of the survey for distant Solar System objects beyond the Kuiper Cliff using the new wide-field cameras on the Subaru and Cerro Tololo Inter-American Observatory (CTIO) telescopes.

== Orbit and classification ==
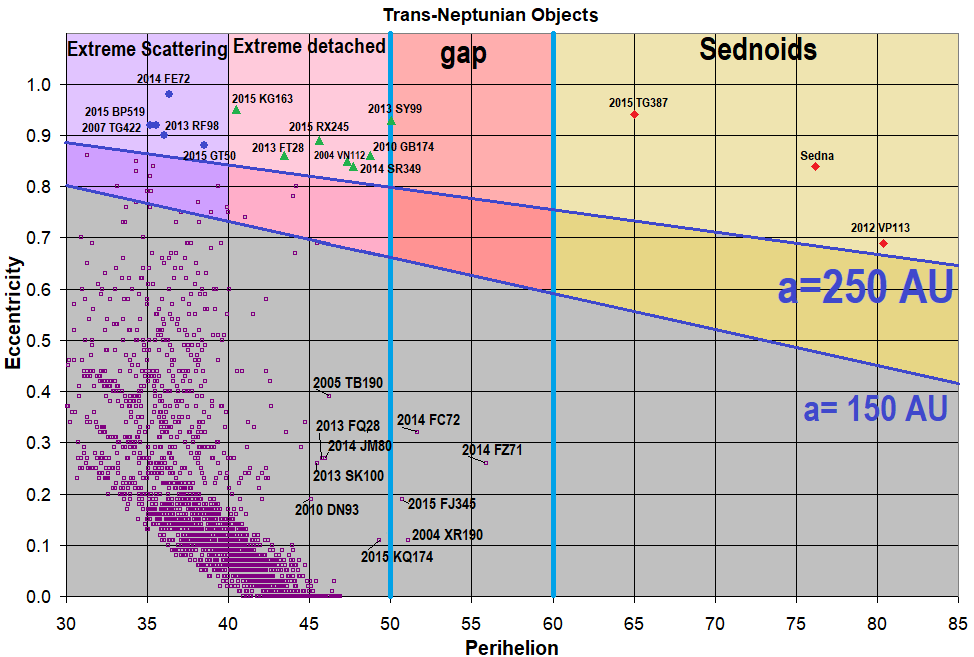
The object is located in the "gap", a poorly understood region.

2014 FZ_{71} orbits the Sun at a distance of 55.8–95.8 AU once every 660 years and 3 months (241,142 days; semi-major axis of 75.82 AU). Its orbit has a moderate eccentricity of 0.26 and an inclination of 26° with respect to the ecliptic.

The object belongs to the same orbital group as 2004 XR190 ("Buffy"), 2014 FC72, 2015 FJ345 and 2015 KQ174 (also see diagram). With an orbital period of 660 years, it seems to be resonant trans-Neptunian objects in a 1:4 resonance with Neptune, as are 2003 LA7 and 2011 UP_{411}, but with a lower eccentricity and therefore higher perihelion.

Considered a scattered and detached object, 2014 FZ_{71} is particularly unusual as it has an unusually circular orbit for a scattered-disc object (SDO). Although it is thought that traditional scattered-disc objects have been ejected into their current orbits by gravitational interactions with Neptune, the low eccentricity of its orbit and the distance of its perihelion (SDOs generally have highly eccentric orbits and perihelia less than 38 AU) seems hard to reconcile with such celestial mechanics. This has led to some uncertainty as to the current theoretical understanding of the outer Solar System. The theories include close stellar passages, unseen planet/rogue planets/planetary embryos in the early Kuiper belt, and resonance interaction with an outward-migrating Neptune. The Kozai mechanism is capable of transferring orbital eccentricity to a higher inclination.

== Physical characteristics ==
2014 FZ_{71} has a diameter estimated between 125 and 185 kilometers, roughly a quarter the size of 2004 XR190 ("Buffy") which is estimated at 500 kilometres (310 mi), roughly a quarter the size of Pluto. It is therefore not a dwarf planet candidate.
