= 2015 FJ345 =

Trans-Neptunian object

2015 FJ_{345}
Discovery
- Discovered by: Mauna Kea Obs.
- Discovery site: Mauna Kea Obs. (first observed only)
- Discovery date: 17 March 2015

Designations
- Minor planet category: TNO; detached; SDO; distant

Orbital characteristics
- Epoch 27 April 2019 (JD 2458600.5)
- Uncertainty parameter: 6; 4
- Observation arc: 1.13 yr (413 d)
- Aphelion: 74.837 AU
- Perihelion: 50.785 AU
- Semi-major axis: 62.811 AU
- Eccentricity: 0.1915
- Orbital period (sidereal): 497.81 yr (181,824 d)
- Mean anomaly: 58.879°
- Mean motion: 0° 0^{m} 7.2^{s} / day
- Inclination: 34.973°
- Longitude of ascending node: 37.881°
- Argument of perihelion: 77.511°

Physical characteristics
- Mean diameter: 117 km; 125±25 km
- Geometric albedo: 0.09 (assumed)
- Apparent magnitude: 25.74
- Absolute magnitude (H): 7.9

2015 FJ_{345} is a trans-Neptunian object and detached object, located in the scattered disc, the outermost region of the Solar System. It was first observed on 17 March 2015, by a team led by American astronomer Scott Sheppard at the Mauna Kea Observatories, in Hawaii, United States. With its perihelion of almost 51 AU, it belongs to a small and poorly understood group of very distant objects with moderate eccentricities. The object measures approximately 120 kilometers (75 miles) in diameter.

== Discovery ==
2015 FJ_{345} was first observed on 17 March 2015, by a team of astronomers led by Scott Sheppard of the Carnegie Institution for Science as part of the survey for distant Solar System objects beyond the Kuiper Cliff using the new wide-field cameras on the Subaru and Cerro Tololo Inter-American Observatory (CTIO) telescopes.

== Orbit and classification ==
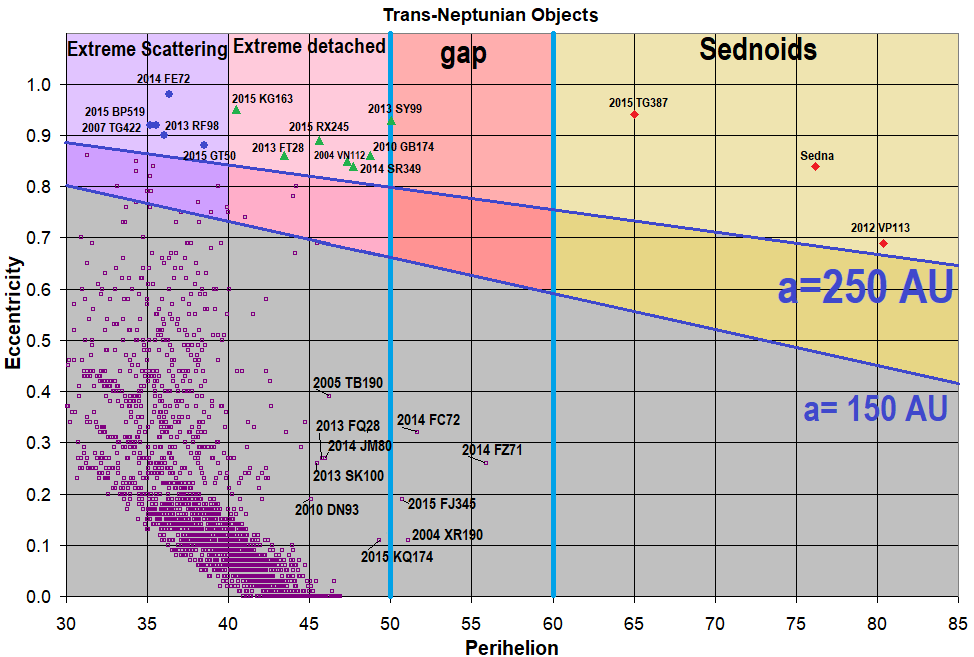
The object is located in the "gap", a poorly understood region.

2015 FJ_{345} orbits the Sun at a distance of 50.8–74.8 AU once every 497 years and 10 months (181,824 days; semi-major axis of 62.81 AU). Its orbit has an eccentricity of 0.19 and an inclination of 35° with respect to the ecliptic.

The object belongs to the same group as 2004 XR190 ("Buffy"), 2014 FC72, 2014 FZ71 and 2015 KQ174 (also see diagram). With an orbital period of 498 years, it seems to be a resonant trans-Neptunian object in a 1:3 resonance with Neptune, as several other objects, but with a lower eccentricity (0.19 instead of more than 0.60) and higher perihelia (at 50.8 AU rather than 31–41 AU).

Considered a scattered and detached object, 2015 FJ_{345} is particularly unusual as it has an unusually circular orbit for a scattered-disc object (SDO). Although it is thought that traditional scattered-disc objects have been ejected into their current orbits by gravitational interactions with Neptune, the low eccentricity of its orbit and the distance of its perihelion (SDOs generally have highly eccentric orbits and perihelia less than 38 AU) seems hard to reconcile with such celestial mechanics. This has led to some uncertainty as to the current theoretical understanding of the outer Solar System. The theories include close stellar passages, unseen planet/rogue planets/planetary embryos in the early Kuiper belt, and resonance interaction with an outward-migrating Neptune. The Kozai mechanism is capable of transferring orbital eccentricity to a higher inclination.

== Physical characteristics ==
2015 FJ_{345} has a diameter estimated between 117 and 125 kilometers.
