= (690420) 2014 FC72 =

Trans-Neptunian object

(690420) 2014 FC_{72}
Discovery
- Discovered by: Pan-STARRS 1
- Discovery site: Haleakala Obs.
- Discovery date: 24 March 2014 (first observed only)

Designations
- Minor planet category: TNO; detached; SDO; distant

Orbital characteristics
- Epoch 27 April 2019 (JD 2458600.5)
- Uncertainty parameter 3
- Observation arc: 16.91 yr (6,178 d)
- Aphelion: 100.57 AU
- Perihelion: 51.663 AU
- Semi-major axis: 76.114 AU
- Eccentricity: 0.3212
- Orbital period (sidereal): 664.06 yr (242,547 d)
- Mean anomaly: 357.23°
- Mean motion: 0° 0^{m} 5.4^{s} / day
- Inclination: 29.859°
- Longitude of ascending node: 178.00°
- Time of perihelion: ≈ 25 November 2023 ±7 days
- Argument of perihelion: 33.138°
- Known satellites: 0

Physical characteristics
- Mean diameter: 431 km; 506 km
- Geometric albedo: 0.07 (assumed); 0.124 (assumed)
- Apparent magnitude: 22.09
- Absolute magnitude (H): 4.68; 4.70

(690420) 2014 FC_{72} is a trans-Neptunian object, classified as a scattered and detached object, located in the outermost region of the Solar System. It was first observed on 24 March 2014 by astronomers with the Pan-STARRS survey at Haleakala Observatory, Hawaii, United States. With its perihelion distant from Neptune, it belongs to a small and poorly understood group of objects with moderate eccentricities. It is estimated to measure 400 to 500 kilometers (200 to 300 miles) in diameter, assuming a low albedo.

== Orbit and classification ==
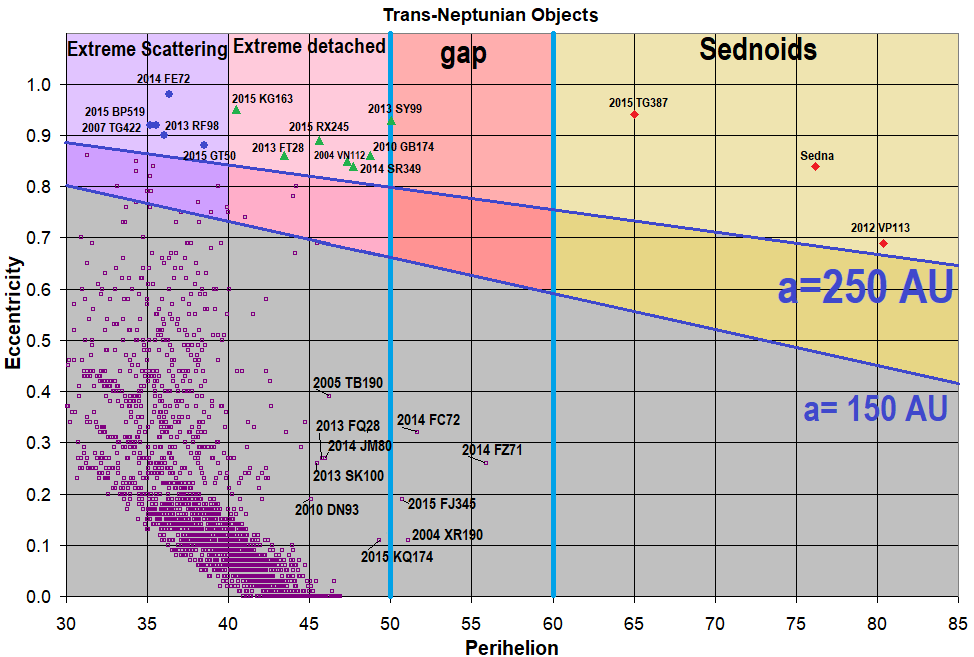
The object is located in the "gap", a poorly understood region.

2014 FC_{72} orbits the Sun at a distance of 51.7–100.6 AU once every 664 years (242,547 days; semi-major axis of 76.11 AU). Its orbit has a moderate eccentricity of 0.32 and an inclination of 30° with respect to the ecliptic.

The object belongs to the same orbital group as (612911) 2004 XR190 ("Buffy"), 2014 FZ71, 2015 FJ345 and 2015 KQ174 (also see diagram). With an orbital period of 664 years, they seem to be resonant trans-Neptunian objects in a 1:4 resonance with Neptune, as are 2003 LA7 and 2011 UP_{411}, but with lower eccentricities and therefore higher perihelia as the latter.

Considered a scattered and detached object, 2014 FC_{72} is particularly unusual as it has an unusually circular orbit for a scattered-disc object (SDO). Although it is thought that traditional scattered-disc objects have been ejected into their current orbits by gravitational interactions with Neptune, the low eccentricity of its orbit and the distance of its perihelion (SDOs generally have highly eccentric orbits and perihelia less than 38 AU) seems hard to reconcile with such celestial mechanics. This has led to some uncertainty as to the current theoretical understanding of the outer Solar System. The theories include close stellar passages, unseen planet/rogue planets/planetary embryos in the early Kuiper belt, and resonance interaction with an outward-migrating Neptune. The Kozai mechanism is capable of transferring orbital eccentricity to a higher inclination.

== Physical characteristics ==
2014 FC_{72} has a diameter estimated at 400 to 500 kilometers (250 to 310 miles), making it approximately 18% to 21% the size of the dwarf planet Pluto. (Note: Pluto has a diameter of 2,376.6 km (1,476.8 mi). 18% and 21% of Pluto's diameter is 428 km (266 mi) and 499 km (310 mi), which is roughly around 2014 FC_{72}'s size of 431 km to 506 km.) With Johnston's Archive's estimate being 431 kilometers (268 miles), and Mike Brown's estimate being 506 kilometers (314 miles), assuming albedos of 0.124 and 0.07, respectively. However, Mike Brown's estimate uses an outdated absolute magnitude of 5.0, not the newer 4.68 nor 4.70.
